= List of Northern Ireland Parliament by-elections =

This is a list of by-elections to the Northern Ireland House of Commons, from its creation in 1921 until its abolition in 1972.

Date	Constituency	Incumbent		Winner		Cause
2 May 1923	Belfast West	William Twaddell	UUP	Philip James Woods	Ind. Unionist	Death
6 November 1925	Belfast South	Philip James Woods	UUP	Anthony Babington	UUP	Declined seat in favour of Belfast West
25 November 1925	Armagh	Richard Best	UUP	John Clarke Davison	UUP	Appointed Lord Justice of Appeal
10 November 1930	North Tyrone	William Thomas Miller	UUP	James Fulton Gamble	UUP	Death
4 June 1934	Belfast Central	Joseph Devlin	Nationalist	Thomas Joseph Campbell	Nationalist	Death
22 March 1935	Queen's University of Belfast	Robert McNeill	Ind. Unionist	Arthur Brownlow Mitchell	UUP	Resignation
2 April 1937	Belfast Ballynafeigh	Thomas Moles	UUP	Frederick Thompson	UUP	Death
7 May 1937	Foyle	James Joseph McCarroll	Nationalist	Patrick Maxwell	Nationalist	Death
27 May 1937	Larne	George Hanna	UUP	Harold Claude Robinson	UUP	Resignation
29 September 1938	Mid Armagh	John Clarke Davison	UUP	Norman Stronge	UUP	Resignation
5 December 1938	Queen's University of Belfast	Robert James Johnstone	UUP	Howard Stevenson	UUP	Death
27 April 1939	City of Londonderry	Edward Sullivan Murphy	UUP	William Lowry	UUP	Death
10 November 1939	Bannside	George Charles Gillespie Young	UUP	Malcolm Patrick	UUP	Death
15 March 1941	Central Armagh	David Shillington	UUP	George Dougan	UUP	Death
27 March 1941	North Down	James Craig	UUP	Thomas Bailie	Ind. Unionist	Death
2 July 1941	Mid Tyrone	Hugh McAleer	Nationalist	Michael McGurk	Ind. Nationalist	Death
3 December 1941	Belfast Willowfield	Arthur Black	UUP	Harry Midgley	NI Labour	Resignation
2 April 1942	Belfast Falls	Richard Byrne	Nationalist	Eamon Donnelly	Ind. Republican	Death
19 October 1942	Queen's University of Belfast	Arthur Brownlow Mitchell	UUP	William Lyle	UUP	Death
2 July 1943	Queen's University of Belfast	Robert Corkey	UUP	John W. Renshaw	UUP	Resignation
11 August 1943	North Tyrone	James Gamble	UUP	Thomas Lyons	UUP	Death
26 August 1943	Carrick	John Fawcett Gordon	UUP	John Dermot Campbell	UUP	Resignation
13 December 1944	Queen's University of Belfast	John MacDermott	UUP	Herbert Quin	UUP	Appointed High Court Judge
12 April 1945	South Tyrone	Rowley Elliott	UUP	W. F. McCoy	UUP	Death
19 April 1945	Carrick	John Dermot Campbell	UUP	Lancelot Curran	UUP	Death
19 April 1945	Larne	Harold Claude Robinson	UUP	Walter Topping	UUP	Death
15 October 1945	North Antrim	Robert Lynn	UUP	William McCleery	UUP	Death
22 August 1946	Belfast Central	Thomas Joseph Campbell	Nationalist	Frank Hanna	NI Labour	Resignation
7 November 1946	Bannside	Malcolm Patrick	UUP	Terence O'Neill	UUP	Death
27 June 1947	City of Londonderry	William Lowry	UUP	James Godfrey MacManaway	UUP	Resignation
20 April 1948	Queen's University, Belfast	Frederick McSorley	Independent	Samuel Irwin	UUP	Death
16 August 1948	Mid Tyrone	Michael McGurk	Nationalist	Edward McCullagh	Nationalist	Death
24 October 1949	Enniskillen	Erne Ferguson	UUP	Thomas Charles Nelson	UUP	Resignation
15 November 1949	Queen's University, Belfast	William Lyle	UUP	Frederick Lloyd-Dodd	UUP	Death
29 November 1949	Belfast Duncairn	William Grant	UUP	George Hanna	UUP	Death
20 January 1950	Carrick	Lancelot Curran	UUP	Alexander Hunter	UUP	Resignation
4 April 1950	Belfast Woodvale	John William Nixon	Ind. Unionist	Robert Harcourt	UUP	Death
31 October 1950	Belfast Bloomfield	Herbert Dixon	UUP	Daniel Dixon	UUP	Death
6 December 1950	South Armagh	Malachy Conlon	Nationalist	Charles McGleenan	Anti-Partition	Death
2 February 1951	Antrim Borough	Hugh Minford	UUP	Nat Minford	UUP	Death
18 June 1951	City of Londonderry	James Godfrey MacManaway	UUP	Edward Warburton Jones	UUP	Resignation
10 December 1951	South Antrim	John Milne Barbour	UUP	Brian McConnell	UUP	Death
8 May 1954	Enniskillen	Thomas Charles Nelson	UUP	Harry West	UUP	Death
15 October 1955	Central Armagh	George Dougan	UUP	Isaac Hawthorne	UUP	Death
15 November 1955	Belfast Woodvale	Robert Harcourt	UUP	Neville Martin	UUP	Elected Lord Mayor of Belfast
23 November 1956	Belfast Windsor	Archibald Wilson	UUP	Herbert Kirk	UUP	Resignation
4 December 1956	Belfast Duncairn	George Hanna	UUP	William Fitzsimmons	UUP	Resignation
5 March 1959	West Down	John Edgar Bailey	UUP	David John Little	UUP	Death
28 May 1959	Belfast Clifton	Robin Kinahan	UUP	William James Morgan	UUP	Elected Lord Mayor of Belfast
5 February 1960	Larne	Walter Topping	UUP	William Craig	UUP	Resignation
16 February 1960	Belfast Shankill	Henry Holmes	UUP	Desmond Boal	UUP	Resignation
9 July 1960	South Londonderry	Dehra Parker	UUP	James Chichester-Clark	UUP	Resignation
29 November 1960	North Londonderry	Robert Moore	UUP	Joseph Burns	UUP	Death
20 April 1961	Belfast Bloomfield	Daniel Dixon	UUP	Walter Scott	UUP	Resignation
22 November 1961	Queen's University, Belfast	Samuel Irwin	UUP	Sheelagh Murnaghan	Ulster Liberal	Death
6 December 1962	Belfast Cromac	Joseph Morgan	UUP	William Kennedy	UUP	Death
9 May 1964	Iveagh	Brian Maginess	UUP	Samuel Magowan	UUP	Appointed County Court Judge
30 June 1964	East Tyrone	Joe Stewart	Nationalist	Austin Currie	Nationalist	Death
3 December 1964	Mid Down	John L. O. Andrews	UUP	Basil Kelly	UUP	Elected to Senate
19 June 1965	West Down	David John Little	UUP	John Dobson	UUP	Appointed Recorder of Londonderry
23 November 1966	Queen's University, Belfast	Charles Stewart	Independent	Robert Porter	UUP	Resignation
25 May 1967	South Down	Joseph Connellan	Nationalist	Michael Keogh	Nationalist	Death
22 March 1968	Lisnaskea	Basil Brooke	UUP	John Brooke	UUP	Resignation
16 May 1968	City of Londonderry	Edward Warburton Jones	UUP	Albert Anderson	UUP	Appointed High Court Judge
6 November 1968	South Antrim	Brian McConnell	UUP	Richard Ferguson	UUP	Resignation
16 April 1970	Bannside	Terence O'Neill	UUP	Ian Paisley	Protestant Unionist	Resignation
16 April 1970	South Antrim	Richard Ferguson	UUP	William Beattie	Protestant Unionist	Resignation
12 November 1970	Belfast St Anne's	Norman Laird	UUP	John Laird	UUP	Death
