= List of female members of the Parliament of Northern Ireland =

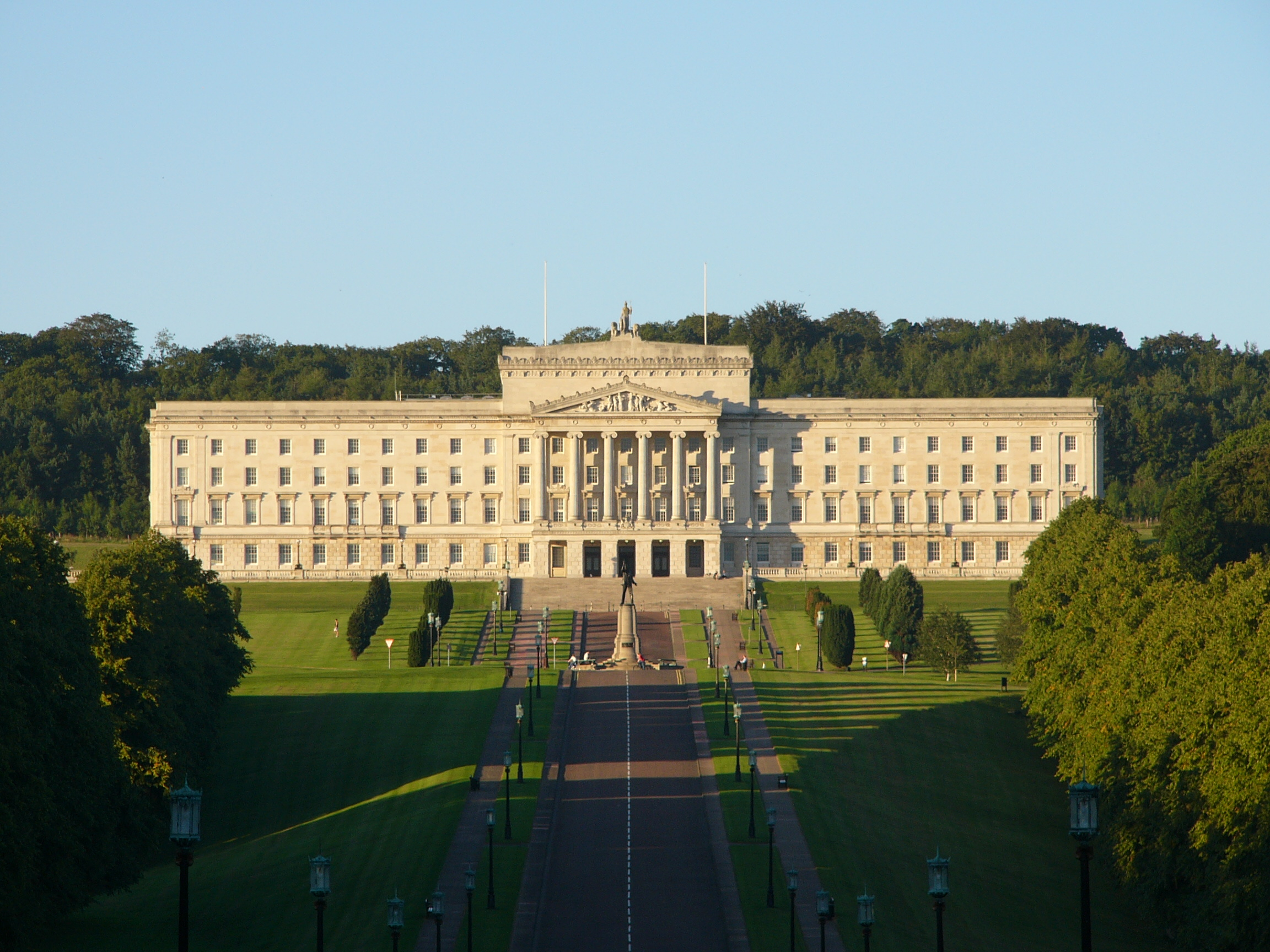
Parliament Buildings in Stormont, Belfast, where the Parliament of Northern Ireland met from 1932 to 1972

The Parliament of Northern Ireland was created under the Government of Ireland Act 1920, and first met after a general election held on 24 May 1921. The Parliament of Northern Ireland was bicameral, consisting of the House of Commons of Northern Ireland and the Senate of Northern Ireland.

Parliament was suspended on 30 March 1972, when the Northern Ireland (Temporary Provisions) Act 1972 imposed direct rule from London, and was formally abolished on 18 July 1973 under the Northern Ireland Constitution Act 1973.

In total there were 9 female members of the House of Commons and 2 female members of the Senate.

== House of Commons ==
The House of Commons had 52 members, known as MPs. They were elected by single transferable vote (STV) in the 1921 and 1925 elections, and from 1929 onwards by first-past-the-post, except for the 4-seat Queen's University of Belfast constituency which retained STV until its abolition in 1969.

A total of nine women were elected to the Commons in its 51-year existence, serving for an average of eight and a half years. On average the Commons had two women MPs at any one time, falling to one from 1925 to 1933 and after 1969, and peaking from 1949 to 1958 at four MPs (7.7% of the House's 52 MPs). Some sources (e.g. Taillon & Urquhart 2002, p. 354) wrongly assert the total as ten women, by including Bernadette Devlin as a Stormont MP. Devlin was elected at a by-election in April 1969 to the House of Commons of the United Kingdom in Westminster, but did not win a seat at Stormont when she stood against James Chichester-Clark in South Londonderry at the Northern Ireland general election on 24 February 1969.

Four of the nine women were elected by the Queen's University of Belfast constituency, including the lawyer Sheelagh Murnaghan (1961–1969). She was the only woman elected at a contested by-election (in November 1961), and also the only member of the Ulster Liberal Party ever elected to the Northern Ireland House of Commons. Two of the women (Irene Calvert and Eileen M. Hickey) were independent politicians, both elected by Queen's.

The remaining six were all members of the Ulster Unionist Party, which had a majority of seats throughout the Parliament's existence. Women had played an important role in Ulster unionist resistance to Irish Home rule, but after achieving Northern Ireland's continued place in the United Kingdom, the new province was predominantly governed by men. (A similar process happened in the southern part of the newly-partitioned Ireland. Women had played a crucial part in the struggle for independence, but the politics of the new Irish Free State were male-dominated.)

No explicitly nationalist women were elected to Stormont, although Eileen Hickey is sometimes labelled as a nationalist. The abolition of STV in 1929 had, as intended, made it harder for any nationalist to win a seat in most of Northern Ireland; but after the death in 1934 of Joseph Devlin, a lack of unity among nationalists compounded their difficulties. Nationalist women were further hindered by the decline in the 1930s of Cumann na mBan, which collapsed in the early 1940s leaving nationalist and republican women with little effective organisation. Bernadette Devlin's candidacy at the 1969 general election in South Londonderry was the closest any nationalist woman came to winning a seat, when she won nearly 40% of the votes in a seat which had been contested only once (in 1949) since its creation in 1929.

The nine women included two Roman Catholics: the Liberal Sheelagh Murnaghan and the independent Eileen M. Hickey, both elected by Queen's.

Prime Minister James Craig was explicit about the main purpose of abolishing STV: to prevent the emergence of non-sectarian class politics, and force voters to make a binary choice between supporters and opponents of the union with Great Britain. This was largely successful: the Northern Ireland Labour Party (NILP), which had won three seats in 1925, never made a breakthrough. Even in 1962, when NILP won 26% of the votes, it won only four seats. Under STV in 1925, a 4.7% vote share had won NILP three seats. NILP had established a women's section in 1924, but it collapsed in the early 1930s. No women were elected as NILP MPs.

=== Impact of women MPs ===
In the first Parliament, unionist Julia McMordie (1921–1925) was notable for her support of women officers in the Royal Ulster Constabulary. She did not advocate equal pay for women, but did support equal allowances and provisions.

In the 1940s and 1950s, the independent Irene Calvert (1945–1953) secured reforms to education and child welfare laws. In the 1950s, the Unionist Dinah McNabb (1945–1969) campaigned against greyhound racing on Sundays. In the 1960s, McNabb was a strident opponent of the development in her constituency of the new town of Craigavon, and of the compensation rates for farmers whose land was compulsorily purchased.

The Liberal Sheelagh Murnaghan's time in Stormont was notable for her introduction in 1964 of a Human Rights Bill which would have outlawed discrimination on grounds of religion or gender, and established a commission to enforce the ban. The bill was defeated, as were her three further attempts with modified versions of the bill in 1965 and twice in 1967. In the 1999 the Northern Ireland Human Rights Commission was established as a component of the Good Friday Agreement which brought an end to The Troubles; the Commission's first Chief Commissioner Brice Dickson described Murnaghan as having "planted a seed".

By far the most significant woman in the House of Commons of Northern Ireland was its longest-serving woman MP, the unionist Dehra Parker (1921–1929, 1933–1960), with a total of 35 years of service. Known as Dehra Chichester until her second marriage in 1928, she and Julia McMordie were the only women returned in the first Parliament in 1921. Parker stood down at the 1929 general election, when her son-in-law James Lenox-Conyngham Chichester-Clark won a seat, and went to live in England with her new husband. On James's death in 1933, she was elected unopposed in his place, and held the seat until her resignation in 1960, when her grandson (James Chichester-Clark) was elected unopposed to succeed her. James was later Prime Minister of Northern Ireland, succeeding another of Dehra's grandsons, Terence O'Neill.

From 1937 to 1944, Parker was Parliamentary Secretary (junior minister) to the Ministry of Education. One of her civil servants in that office, J.A. Oliver, described her as an "adroit politician and a formidable operator". She was the only woman to serve in the then cabinet of Northern Ireland (the Executive Committee of the Privy Council of Northern Ireland), as Minister of Health and Local Government from 1949 to 1957.

=== List of MPs ===
Name	Party	Constituency	Start	End	Reason
Julia McMordie	Ulster Unionist	Belfast South	1921	1925	Retired
Dehra Parker	Ulster Unionist	Londonderry	1921	1929	Retired
Dehra Parker	Ulster Unionist	South Londonderry	1933	1960	Retired
Margaret Waring	Ulster Unionist	Iveagh	1929	1933	Retired
Irene Calvert	Independent	Queen's University	1945	1953	Retired
Dinah McNabb	Ulster Unionist	North Armagh	1945	1969	Retired
Eileen Hickey	Independent	Queen's University	1949	1958	Retired
Elizabeth Maconachie	Ulster Unionist	Queen's University	1953	1969	Retired
Sheelagh Murnaghan	Ulster Liberal	Queen's University	1961	1969	Defeated
Anne Dickson	Ulster Unionist	Carrick	1969	1972 (Note: Technically members of the Parliament of Northern Ireland remained members after the Parliament was suspended on 30 March 1972. However, the suspension was never revoked before the Parliament was abolished in 1973, so the de facto end of their term was in 1972.)	Position abolished

== Senate ==
There were two women in the Senate of Northern Ireland: Marion Greeves and Edith Taggart.

=== List of Senators ===
Name	Party	Start	End	Reason
Marion Greeves	Independent	1950	1953	Defected
Marion Greeves	Ulster Unionist	1953	1969	Resigned
Edith Taggart	Ulster Unionist	1970	1972	Position abolished

== Bibliography ==
- Bogdanor, Vernon (2001) [1999]. Devolution in the United Kingdom. Oxford University Press. ISBN 9780192801289 – via Google Books.
- Dickson, Brice (2011). The European Convention on Human Rights and the Conflict in Northern Ireland. Oxford University Press. ISBN 9780199652341 – via Google Books.
- Edwards, Aaron (2009). A History of the Northern Ireland Labour Party: Democratic Socialism and Sectarianism. Manchester University Press. ISBN 9780719078743 – via Google Books.
- Galligan, Yvonne; Buckley, Fiona (December 2017). "Chapter 9: Women in Politics". In Coakley, John; Gallagher, Michael (eds.). Politics in the Republic of Ireland (6th ed.). Routledge. p. 291. ISBN 978-1138119451.
- McNamara, Maedhbh; Mooney, Paschal (2000). Women in Parliament: Ireland 1918–2000. Dublin: Wolfhound Press. ISBN 978-0-86327-759-7.
- Moriarty-Lempke, Maureen (1999). "Chapter 3: Propaganda and Planning: A Case Study of the New Town of Craigavon, Northern Ireland" (PDF). Planning in Divided Societies: A Case Study of the Introduction of Regional Planning in Northern Ireland 1964-1970. Manchester University Press. ISBN 9780719078743. Archived from the original on 3 March 2016 – via archive.org.
- Norton, Christopher (2014). The Politics of Constitutional Nationalism in Northern Ireland, 1932–1970. Manchester University Press. ISBN 9780719059032 – via Google Books.
- Taillon, Ruth; Urquhart, Diane, eds. (2002). "Women, Politics and The State in Northern Ireland, 1918–66". The Field Day Anthology of Irish Writing. Vol. 5: Irish Women's Writings and Traditions. New York University Press. pp. 353–403. ISBN 978-0-8147-9907-9 – via Google Books.
- Walker, Brian M, ed. (1992). Parliamentary election results in Ireland, 1918–92. A New History of Ireland; Ancillary Publications. Dublin: Royal Irish Academy. ISBN 978-0-901714-96-1. ISSN 0332-0286.
- Walker, Brian M. (17 January 2012). A Political History of the Two Irelands: From Partition to Peace. Palgrave Macmillan. ISBN 9780230361478 – via Google books.
- Ward, Paul (2005). "Fur-Coat Unionism: Dame Dehra Parker (1882–1963)". Unionism in the United Kingdom, 1918–1974. London: Palgrave Macmillan. pp. 162–181. doi:10.1057/9780230000964_11. ISBN 978-0-8147-9907-9 – via springer.com.
