= Irish cabinets since 1919 =

== Ireland (and predecessor states) ==
The executive branch of the modern state of Ireland is titled the Government of Ireland. It has had this title since the adoption of the Constitution of Ireland in 1937. The Ministry of Dáil Éireann was the cabinet of the unrecognised Irish Republic, which operated from 1919 to 1922. This overlapped with the Provisional Government which was put in place after the approval of the Anglo-Irish Treaty in January 1922. Both these cabinets ceased to operate from December 1922, on the coming into being of the Irish Free State. From 1922 to 1937, the cabinet was known as the Executive Council of the Irish Free State.

=== Types of government since 1919 ===
Cabinet	State	Head	Deputy	Constitution	Date
Ministry	Irish Republic	President of Dáil Éireann (Note: Éamon de Valera used the title President of the Republic from August 1921 to January 1922.)	N/A	Dáil Constitution	21 January 1919 – 6 December 1922
Provisional Government	Southern Ireland	Chairman	N/A	Irish Free State (Agreement) Act 1922	3 May 1921 – 6 December 1922
Executive Council	Irish Free State	President	Vice-President	Constitution of the Irish Free State	6 December 1922 – 29 December 1937
Government	Ireland	Taoiseach	Tánaiste	Constitution of Ireland	Since 29 December 1937

=== Cabinets since 1919 ===
State	Dáil	Election	Formation	Cabinet	Composition	Head	Deputy
Irish Republic	1st	1918	22 January 1919	1st ministry	SF	Cathal Brugha	N/A
Irish Republic	1st	1918	1 April 1919	2nd ministry	SF	Éamon de Valera	Arthur Griffith (Note: On 17 June 1919 Griffith was appointed Deputy President.)
Irish Republic	2nd	1921	26 August 1921	3rd ministry	SF	Éamon de Valera	N/A
Irish Republic	2nd	1921	10 January 1922	4th ministry (Note: The 4th Ministry and 1st Provisional Government held office simultaneously.)	SF (PT)	Arthur Griffith	N/A
Southern Ireland	2nd	1921	16 January 1922	1st provisional government	SF (PT)	Michael Collins (Note: Collins was killed on 22 August 1922. Cosgrave was appointed as Chairman of the Provisional Government on 25 August 1922.)	N/A
Southern Ireland	3rd	1922	30 August 1922	2nd provisional government (Note: The 5th Dáil Ministry was formed on 9 September 1922 with the same composition as the Second Provisional Government)	SF (PT) (minority)	W. T. Cosgrave	N/A
Irish Free State	3rd	1922	6 December 1922	1st executive council	SF (PT) (minority)	W. T. Cosgrave	Kevin O'Higgins
Irish Free State	4th	1923	19 September 1923	2nd executive council	CNG (minority)	W. T. Cosgrave	Kevin O'Higgins
Irish Free State	5th	June 1927	23 June 1927	3rd executive council	CNG (minority)	W. T. Cosgrave	Kevin O'Higgins
Irish Free State	5th	June 1927	23 June 1927	3rd executive council	CNG (minority)	W. T. Cosgrave	Ernest Blythe
Irish Free State	6th	Sept. 1927	11 October 1927	4th executive council	CNG (minority)	W. T. Cosgrave	Ernest Blythe
Irish Free State	6th	Sept. 1927	2 April 1930	5th executive council	CNG (minority)	W. T. Cosgrave	Ernest Blythe
Irish Free State	7th	1932	9 March 1932	6th executive council	FF (minority)	Éamon de Valera	Seán T. O'Kelly
Irish Free State	8th	1933	8 February 1933	7th executive council	FF (minority)	Éamon de Valera	Seán T. O'Kelly
Irish Free State	9th	1937	21 July 1937	8th executive council	FF (minority)	Éamon de Valera	Seán T. O'Kelly
Ireland	9th	1937	29 December 1937 (Note: The 8th executive Council became the 1st government of Ireland on the coming into operation of the Constitution of Ireland.)	1st government	FF (minority)	Éamon de Valera	Seán T. O'Kelly
Ireland	10th	1938	30 June 1938	2nd government	FF	Éamon de Valera	Seán T. O'Kelly
Ireland	11th	1943	1 July 1943	3rd government	FF (minority)	Éamon de Valera	Seán T. O'Kelly
Ireland	12th	1944	9 June 1944	4th government	FF	Éamon de Valera	Seán T. O'Kelly
Ireland	12th	1944	9 June 1944	4th government	FF	Éamon de Valera	Seán Lemass (Note: On 19 June 1945 Lemass was appointed as Tánaiste after the election of O'Kelly as President of Ireland.)
Ireland	13th	1948	18 February 1948	5th government	FG–Lab–CNP–CNT–NLP–Ind	John A. Costello	William Norton
Ireland	14th	1951	13 June 1951	6th government	FF (minority)	Éamon de Valera	Seán Lemass
Ireland	15th	1954	2 June 1954	7th government	FG–Lab–CNT	John A. Costello	William Norton
Ireland	16th	1957	20 March 1957	8th government	FF	Éamon de Valera	Seán Lemass
Ireland	16th	1957	23 June 1959	9th government	FF	Seán Lemass	Seán MacEntee
Ireland	17th	1961	11 October 1961	10th government	FF (minority)	Seán Lemass	Seán MacEntee
Ireland	18th	1965	21 April 1965	11th government	FF	Seán Lemass	Frank Aiken
Ireland	18th	1965	10 November 1966	12th government	FF	Jack Lynch	Frank Aiken
Ireland	19th	1969	2 July 1969	13th government	FF	Jack Lynch	Erskine H. Childers
Ireland	20th	1973	14 March 1973	14th government	FG–Lab	Liam Cosgrave	Brendan Corish
Ireland	21st	1977	5 July 1977	15th government	FF	Jack Lynch	George Colley
Ireland	21st	1977	11 December 1979	16th government	FF	Charles Haughey	George Colley
Ireland	22nd	1981	30 June 1981	17th government	FG–Lab (minority)	Garret FitzGerald	Michael O'Leary
Ireland	23rd	Feb. 1982	9 March 1982	18th government	FF (minority)	Charles Haughey	Ray MacSharry
Ireland	24th	Nov. 1982	14 December 1982	19th government	FG–Lab; FG (minority) from Jan. 1987	Garret FitzGerald	Dick Spring
Ireland	24th	Nov. 1982	14 December 1982	19th government	FG–Lab; FG (minority) from Jan. 1987	Garret FitzGerald	Peter Barry (Note: On 20 January 1987 Spring and the other Labour ministers resigned from government and Barry was appointed as Tánaiste.)
Ireland	25th	1987	10 March 1987	20th government	FF (minority)	Charles Haughey	Brian Lenihan
Ireland	26th	1989	12 July 1989	21st government	FF–PD	Charles Haughey	Brian Lenihan
Ireland	26th	1989	12 July 1989	21st government	FF–PD	Charles Haughey	John Wilson (Note: On 31 October 1990 Lenihan was dismissed as Tánaiste and on 13 November 1990 Wilson was appointed.)
Ireland	26th	1989	11 February 1992	22nd government	FF–PD	Albert Reynolds	John Wilson
Ireland	27th	1992	12 January 1993	23rd government	FF–Lab; FF (minority) from Nov. 1994	Albert Reynolds	Dick Spring
Ireland	27th	1992	12 January 1993	23rd government	FF–Lab; FF (minority) from Nov. 1994	Albert Reynolds	Bertie Ahern (Note: On 18 November 1994 Spring and the other Labour ministers resigned from government and Ahern was appointed as Tánaiste.)
Ireland	27th	1992	15 December 1994	24th government	FG–Lab–DL	John Bruton	Dick Spring
Ireland	28th	1997	26 June 1997	25th government	FF–PD (minority)	Bertie Ahern	Mary Harney
Ireland	29th	2002	6 June 2002	26th government	FF–PD	Bertie Ahern	Mary Harney
Ireland	29th	2002	6 June 2002	26th government	FF–PD	Bertie Ahern	Michael McDowell (Note: On 13 September 2006 Harney resigned as Tánaiste and McDowell was appointed in her place.)
Ireland	30th	2007	14 June 2007	27th government	FF–GP–PD	Bertie Ahern	Brian Cowen
Ireland	30th	2007	7 May 2008	28th government	FF–GP–PD; FF–GP–Ind from Nov. 2009; FF (minority) from Jan. 2011	Brian Cowen	Mary Coughlan
Ireland	31st	2011	9 March 2011	29th government	FG–Lab	Enda Kenny	Eamon Gilmore
Ireland	31st	2011	9 March 2011	29th government	FG–Lab	Enda Kenny	Joan Burton (Note: On 11 July 2014 Gilmore resigned as Tánaiste and Burton was appointed in his place.)
Ireland	32nd	2016	6 May 2016	30th government	FG–Ind (minority)	Enda Kenny	Frances Fitzgerald
Ireland	32nd	2016	14 June 2017	31st government	FG–Ind (minority)	Leo Varadkar	Frances Fitzgerald
Ireland	32nd	2016	14 June 2017	31st government	FG–Ind (minority)	Leo Varadkar	Simon Coveney (Note: On 30 November 2017 Fitzgerald resigned as Tánaiste and Coveney was appointed in her place.)
Ireland	33rd	2020	26 June 2020	32nd government	FF–FG–GP	Micheál Martin	Leo Varadkar
Ireland	33rd	2020	17 December 2022	33rd government	FG–FF–GP	Leo Varadkar	Micheál Martin
Ireland	33rd	2020	9 April 2024	34th government	FG–FF–GP	Simon Harris	Micheál Martin
Ireland	34th	2024	23 January 2025	35th government	FF–FG–Ind	Micheál Martin	Simon Harris

Footnotes

== Northern Ireland ==
The current devolved branch of Northern Ireland is known as the Northern Ireland Executive, established under the Good Friday Agreement. The Executive has been in operation, intermittently, since 1999, and is current operational. Since 1921, Northern Ireland has been governed by two other devolved cabinets: Executive Committee of the Privy Council from 1921 to 1972 and the Northern Ireland Executive of 1974. Northern Ireland has also been governed by direct rule from 1972 to 1974, 1974–98 and 2002–07.

=== Types of government since 1921 ===
Cabinet	Head	Deputy	Act	Date
Executive Committee of the Privy Council	Prime Minister of Northern Ireland	Minister of Finance (Note: From 3 May 1969, a separate and distinct office of Deputy Prime Minister was created.)	Government of Ireland Act 1920	7 June 1921 – 30 March 1972
Executive (1974)	Chief Executive	Deputy Chief Executive	Northern Ireland Constitution Act 1973	1 January 1974 – 28 May 1974
Executive	First Minister	Deputy First Minister	Northern Ireland Act 1998	1 July 1998 – 14 October 2002; 8 May 2007 – present

=== Direct rule ===
- The Northern Ireland Office under the Secretary of State for Northern Ireland, established initially by the Northern Ireland (Temporary Provisions) Act 1972 and later Northern Ireland Constitution Act 1973.

=== Cabinets since 1921 ===
Body	Election/Formed	Cabinet	Head	Deputy	Parties
1st House of Commons	1921 election	Craigavon ministry	James Craig	Hugh MacDowell Pollock	Ulster Unionist Party
2nd House of Commons	1925 election	Craigavon ministry	James Craig	Hugh MacDowell Pollock	Ulster Unionist Party
3rd House of Commons	1929 election	Craigavon ministry	James Craig	Hugh MacDowell Pollock	Ulster Unionist Party
4th House of Commons	1933 election	Craigavon ministry	James Craig	Hugh MacDowell Pollock	Ulster Unionist Party
4th House of Commons	1933 election	Craigavon ministry	James Craig	John Miller Andrews	Ulster Unionist Party
5th House of Commons	1938 election	Craigavon ministry	James Craig	John Miller Andrews	Ulster Unionist Party
5th House of Commons	1940	Andrews ministry	John Miller Andrews	None	Ulster Unionist Party
5th House of Commons	1940	Andrews ministry	John Miller Andrews	John Milne Barbour	Ulster Unionist Party
5th House of Commons	1943	Brookeborough ministry	Basil Brooke	John Maynard Sinclair	Ulster Unionist Party
6th House of Commons	1945 election	Brookeborough ministry	Basil Brooke	John Maynard Sinclair	Ulster Unionist Party
7th House of Commons	1949 election	Brookeborough ministry	Basil Brooke	John Maynard Sinclair	Ulster Unionist Party
7th House of Commons	1949 election	Brookeborough ministry	Basil Brooke	None	Ulster Unionist Party
7th House of Commons	1949 election	Brookeborough ministry	Basil Brooke	Brian Maginess	Ulster Unionist Party
8th House of Commons	1953 election	Brookeborough ministry	Basil Brooke	Brian Maginess	Ulster Unionist Party
8th House of Commons	1953 election	Brookeborough ministry	Basil Brooke	George Boyle Hanna	Ulster Unionist Party
8th House of Commons	1953 election	Brookeborough ministry	Basil Brooke	Terence O'Neill	Ulster Unionist Party
9th House of Commons	1958 election	Brookeborough ministry	Basil Brooke	Terence O'Neill	Ulster Unionist Party
10th House of Commons	1962 election	Brookeborough ministry	Basil Brooke	Terence O'Neill	Ulster Unionist Party
10th House of Commons	1963	O'Neill ministry	Terence O'Neill	Jack Andrews	Ulster Unionist Party
10th House of Commons	1963	O'Neill ministry	Terence O'Neill	Ivan Neill	Ulster Unionist Party
10th House of Commons	1963	O'Neill ministry	Terence O'Neill	Herbert Kirk	Ulster Unionist Party
11th House of Commons	1965 election	O'Neill ministry	Terence O'Neill	Herbert Kirk	Ulster Unionist Party
12th House of Commons	1969 election	O'Neill ministry	Terence O'Neill	Herbert Kirk	Ulster Unionist Party
12th House of Commons	1969 (May)	Chichester-Clark ministry	James Chichester-Clark	Jack Andrews	Ulster Unionist Party
12th House of Commons	1971	Faulkner ministry	Brian Faulkner	Jack Andrews	Ulster Unionist Party
12th House of Commons	1972	Direct rule	Secretary of State William Whitelaw		Conservative Party
1973 Assembly	1973 election	Direct rule	Secretary of State William Whitelaw		Conservative Party
1973 Assembly	1973 (Dec)	Direct rule	Secretary of State Francis Pym		Conservative Party
1973 Assembly	1974 (Jan)	Executive (1974)	Brian Faulkner	Gerry Fitt	Ulster Unionist Party
1973 Assembly	1974 (Jan)	Executive (1974)	Brian Faulkner	Gerry Fitt	Social Democratic and Labour Party
1973 Assembly	1974 (Jan)	Executive (1974)	Brian Faulkner	Gerry Fitt	Alliance Party of Northern Ireland
1973 Assembly	1974 (May)	Direct rule	Secretary of State Merlyn Rees		Labour Party
Constitutional Convention	1975 election	Direct rule	Secretary of State Merlyn Rees		Labour Party
Constitutional Convention	1976	Direct rule	Secretary of State Roy Mason		Labour Party
Constitutional Convention	1979	Direct rule	Secretary of State Humphrey Atkins		Conservative Party
Constitutional Convention	1981	Direct rule	Secretary of State James Prior		Conservative Party
1982 Assembly	1982 election	Direct rule	Secretary of State James Prior		Conservative Party
1982 Assembly	1984	Direct rule	Secretary of State Douglas Hurd		Conservative Party
1982 Assembly	1985	Direct rule	Secretary of State Tom King		Conservative Party
1982 Assembly	1989	Direct rule	Secretary of State Peter Brooke		Conservative Party
1982 Assembly	1992	Direct rule	Secretary of State Patrick Mayhew		Conservative Party
Forum	1996 election	Direct rule	Secretary of State Patrick Mayhew		Conservative Party
Forum	1997	Direct rule	Secretary of State Mo Mowlam		Labour Party
1st Assembly	1998 election	1st Executive	David Trimble	Seamus Mallon	Ulster Unionist Party
1st Assembly	1998 election	1st Executive	David Trimble	Seamus Mallon	Social Democratic and Labour Party
1st Assembly	1998 election	1st Executive	David Trimble	Mark Durkan	Democratic Unionist Party
1st Assembly	1998 election	1st Executive	David Trimble	Mark Durkan	Sinn Féin
2nd Assembly	2003 election	Direct rule	Secretary of State John Reid		Labour Party
2nd Assembly	2002	Direct rule	Secretary of State Paul Murphy		Labour Party
2nd Assembly	2005	Direct rule	Secretary of State Peter Hain		Labour Party
3rd Assembly	2007 election	2nd Executive	Ian Paisley	Martin McGuinness	Democratic Unionist Party
3rd Assembly	2007 election	2nd Executive	Ian Paisley	Martin McGuinness	Sinn Féin
3rd Assembly	2007 election	2nd Executive	Peter Robinson	Martin McGuinness	Ulster Unionist Party
3rd Assembly	2007 election	2nd Executive	Peter Robinson	Martin McGuinness	Social Democratic and Labour Party
3rd Assembly	2007 election	2nd Executive	Peter Robinson	Martin McGuinness	Alliance Party of Northern Ireland
4th Assembly	2011 election	3rd Executive	Peter Robinson	Martin McGuinness	Democratic Unionist Party
4th Assembly	2011 election	3rd Executive	Peter Robinson	Martin McGuinness	Sinn Féin
4th Assembly	2011 election	3rd Executive	Peter Robinson	Martin McGuinness	Ulster Unionist Party
4th Assembly	2011 election	3rd Executive	Peter Robinson	Martin McGuinness	Social Democratic and Labour Party
4th Assembly	2011 election	3rd Executive	Peter Robinson	Martin McGuinness	Alliance Party of Northern Ireland
5th Assembly	2016 election	4th Executive	Arlene Foster	Martin McGuinness	Democratic Unionist Party
5th Assembly	2016 election	4th Executive	Arlene Foster	Martin McGuinness	Sinn Féin
6th Assembly	2017 election (Note: Although the 6th Assembly was elected in 2017, the Executive itself was not appointed until 2020, with no Executive existing between 16 January 2017 and 11 January 2020.)	5th Executive	Arlene Foster	Michelle O'Neill	Democratic Unionist Party
6th Assembly	2017 election	5th Executive	Arlene Foster	Michelle O'Neill	Sinn Féin
6th Assembly	2017 election	5th Executive	Arlene Foster	Michelle O'Neill	Social Democratic and Labour Party
6th Assembly	2017 election	5th Executive	Arlene Foster	Michelle O'Neill	Ulster Unionist Party
6th Assembly	2017 election	5th Executive	Arlene Foster	Michelle O'Neill	Alliance Party of Northern Ireland
7th Assembly	2022 election (Note: Although the 7th Assembly was elected in 2022, the Executive itself was not appointed until 2024, with no Executive existing between 4 February 2022 and 3 February 2024.)	6th Executive	Michelle O'Neill	Emma Little-Pengelly	Sinn Féin
7th Assembly	2022 election	6th Executive	Michelle O'Neill	Emma Little-Pengelly	Democratic Unionist Party
7th Assembly	2022 election	6th Executive	Michelle O'Neill	Emma Little-Pengelly	Alliance Party of Northern Ireland
7th Assembly	2022 election	6th Executive	Michelle O'Neill	Emma Little-Pengelly	Ulster Unionist Party

Footnotes

== See also ==
- List of Irish heads of government
- Dáil election results
- Dáil vote for Taoiseach
- Elections in the Republic of Ireland
- History of the Republic of Ireland
- Politics of the Republic of Ireland
- Elections in Northern Ireland
- Politics of Northern Ireland
- Northern Ireland Assembly
- Parliament of Northern Ireland
