= Lists of Irish politicians =

The following lists of politicians and public office-holders in Ireland cover those in both the Republic of Ireland and Northern Ireland, as well as offices within the Lordship of Ireland (1171–1542), the Kingdom of Ireland (1542–1800) and for Ireland within the United Kingdom of Great Britain and Ireland (1801–1922).

== Republic of Ireland ==
=== President ===
- Presidents of Ireland

=== Taoiseach ===
- Taoiseach

=== Tánaiste ===
- Tánaiste

=== Government ministries ===
- Minister for Agriculture, Food and the Marine
- Minister for Children, Disability and Equality
- Minister for Defence
- Minister for Education and Youth
- Minister for Enterprise, Tourism and Employment
- Minister for Climate, Energy and the Environment
- Minister for Finance
- Minister for Foreign Affairs and Trade
- Minister for Health
- Minister for Housing, Local Government and Heritage
- Minister for Justice, Home Affairs and Migration
- Minister for Public Expenditure, Infrastructure, Public Service Reform and Digitalisation
- Minister for Social Protection
- Minister for Culture, Communications and Sport
- Minister for Transport
- List of female cabinet ministers of the Republic of Ireland

==== Defunct Government ministries ====
- Minister for the Co-ordination of Defensive Measures
- Minister for Economic Affairs
- Minister for Fine Arts
- Minister for Industries
- Minister for Labour
- Minister for Posts and Telegraphs
- Minister for Publicity
- Minister for Supplies

=== Ministers of State ===
- Minister of State at the Department of Agriculture, Food and the Marine
- Minister of State at the Department of Children, Disability and Equality
- Minister of State at the Department of Defence
- Minister of State at the Department of Education and Youth
- Minister of State at the Department of Enterprise, Tourism and Employment
- Minister of State at the Department of Climate, Energy and the Environment
- Minister of State at the Department of Finance
- Minister of State at the Department of Foreign Affairs and Trade
- Minister of State at the Department of Further and Higher Education, Research, Innovation and Science
- Minister of State at the Department of Health
- Minister of State at the Department of Housing, Local Government and Heritage
- Minister of State at the Department of Justice, Home Affairs and Migration
- Minister of State at the Department of Public Expenditure, Infrastructure, Public Service Reform and Digitalisation
- Minister of State at the Department of Rural and Community Development and the Gaeltacht
- Minister of State at the Department of Social Protection
- Minister of State at the Department of the Taoiseach
- Minister of State at the Department of Culture, Communications and Sport
- Minister of State at the Department of Transport
- Minister of State for Disability
- Minister of State for European Affairs
- List of female ministers of state of the Republic of Ireland

==== Defunct offices ====
- Minister of State for Children
- Minister of State to the Government
- Minister of State at the Department of Labour
- Minister of State at the Department of Posts and Telegraphs

=== Dáil Éireann ===
- Ceann Comhairle
- List of female members of Dáil Éireann
- List of members of Dáil Éireann who died in office
- 1st Dáil
- 2nd Dáil
- 3rd Dáil
- 4th Dáil
- 5th Dáil
- 6th Dáil
- 7th Dáil
- 8th Dáil
- 9th Dáil
- 10th Dáil
- 11th Dáil
- 12th Dáil
- 13th Dáil
- 14th Dáil
- 15th Dáil
- 16th Dáil
- 17th Dáil
- 18th Dáil
- 19th Dáil
- 20th Dáil
- 21st Dáil
- 22nd Dáil
- 23rd Dáil
- 24th Dáil
- 25th Dáil
- 26th Dáil
- 27th Dáil
- 28th Dáil
- 29th Dáil
- 30th Dáil
- 31st Dáil
- 32nd Dáil
- 33rd Dáil
- 34th Dáil

=== Seanad Éireann ===
- Cathaoirleach
- Leader of the Seanad
- List of female members of Seanad Éireann
- List of members of Seanad Éireann who died in office
- 1922 Seanad
- 1925 Seanad
- 1928 Seanad
- 1931 Seanad
- 1934 Seanad
- 2nd Seanad
- 3rd Seanad
- 4th Seanad
- 5th Seanad
- 6th Seanad
- 7th Seanad
- 8th Seanad
- 9th Seanad
- 10th Seanad
- 11th Seanad
- 12th Seanad
- 13th Seanad
- 14th Seanad
- 15th Seanad
- 16th Seanad
- 17th Seanad
- 18th Seanad
- 19th Seanad
- 20th Seanad
- 21st Seanad
- 22nd Seanad
- 23rd Seanad
- 24th Seanad
- 25th Seanad
- 26th Seanad
- 27th Seanad

=== MEPs ===
- List of members of the European Parliament for Ireland, 1973
- List of members of the European Parliament for Ireland, 1973–1977
- List of members of the European Parliament for Ireland, 1977–1979
- List of members of the European Parliament for Ireland, 1979–1984
- List of members of the European Parliament for Ireland, 1984–1989
- List of members of the European Parliament for Ireland, 1989–1994
- List of members of the European Parliament for Ireland, 1994–1999
- List of members of the European Parliament for Ireland, 1999–2004
- List of members of the European Parliament for Ireland, 2004–2009
- List of members of the European Parliament for Ireland, 2009–2014
- List of members of the European Parliament for Ireland, 2014–2019
- List of members of the European Parliament for Ireland, 2019–2024
- List of members of the European Parliament for Ireland, 2024–2029
- List of female members of the European Parliament for Ireland

=== Mayors ===
- List of mayors of Cork
- List of mayors of Dublin
- List of mayors of Galway
- List of mayors of Limerick

=== Other offices ===
- Leader of the Opposition
- List of Irish European Commissioners
- List of presidential appointees to the Council of State

=== Defunct offices ===
- Senate of Southern Ireland
- Governors-General of the Irish Free State

== Northern Ireland ==
=== First Minister and Deputy First Minister ===
- First Minister and Deputy First Minister

=== MLAs ===
- Members of the Northern Ireland Assembly elected in 1998
- Members of the Northern Ireland Assembly elected in 2003
- Members of the Northern Ireland Assembly elected in 2007
- Members of the Northern Ireland Assembly elected in 2011
- Members of the Northern Ireland Assembly elected in 2016
- Members of the Northern Ireland Assembly elected in 2017
- Members of the Northern Ireland Assembly elected in 2022

=== Mayors ===
- List of mayors of Belfast
- List of mayors of Derry

=== Defunct offices ===
==== Prime minister ====
- Prime Minister of Northern Ireland

==== MPAs ====
- Members of the Northern Ireland Assembly elected in 1973
- Members of the Northern Ireland Constitutional Convention (1975)
- Members of the Northern Ireland Assembly elected in 1982
- Members of the Northern Ireland Forum (1996)

==== MPs (Parliament of Northern Ireland) ====
- List of members of the 1st House of Commons of Northern Ireland
- List of members of the 2nd House of Commons of Northern Ireland
- List of members of the 3rd House of Commons of Northern Ireland
- List of members of the 4th House of Commons of Northern Ireland
- List of members of the 5th House of Commons of Northern Ireland
- List of members of the 6th House of Commons of Northern Ireland
- List of members of the 7th House of Commons of Northern Ireland
- List of members of the 8th House of Commons of Northern Ireland
- List of members of the 9th House of Commons of Northern Ireland
- List of members of the 10th House of Commons of Northern Ireland
- List of members of the 11th House of Commons of Northern Ireland
- List of members of the 12th House of Commons of Northern Ireland
- List of female members of the House of Commons of Northern Ireland

==== MEPs ====
- Northern Ireland MEPs

=== Others ===
- List of Nationalist Party MPs

== Ireland (pre-1922) ==
- Earl Marshal of Ireland
- Chief Secretary for Ireland
- Under-Secretary for Ireland
- List of lords lieutenant of County Dublin
- List of chief governors of Ireland
- List of Irish representative peers
- Lord Chancellor of Ireland
- Lord High Steward of Ireland
- Lord High Treasurer of Ireland

== See also ==
- Lists of heads of state of Ireland
- Families in the Oireachtas
- Records of Irish heads of government since 1922
- Records of members of the Oireachtas
