= List of members of the 9th House of Commons of Northern Ireland =

This is a list of members of Parliament elected in the 1958 Northern Ireland general election.

All members of the Northern Ireland House of Commons elected at the 1958 Northern Ireland general election are listed.

== Members ==
Name	Constituency	Party
John Andrews	Mid Down	UUP
John Edgar Bailey	West Down	UUP
David Bleakley	Belfast Victoria	NI Labour
Alexander Blevins	Mid Tyrone	UUP
Billy Boyd	Belfast Woodvale	NI Labour
Tom Boyd	Belfast Pottinger	NI Labour
Basil Brooke	Lisnaskea	UUP
Joseph Connellan	South Down	Nationalist
Harry Diamond	Belfast Falls	Republican Labour
Daniel Dixon	Belfast Bloomfield	UUP
Brian Faulkner	East Down	UUP
William Fitzsimmons	Belfast Duncairn	UUP
Patrick Gormley	Mid Londonderry	Nationalist
Francis Hanna	Belfast Central	Ind. Labour Group
Isaac Hawthorne	Central Armagh	UUP
Cahir Healy	South Fermanagh	Nationalist
William Hinds	Belfast Willowfield	UUP
Henry Holmes	Belfast Shankill	UUP
Alexander Hunter	Carrick	UUP
Samuel Irwin	Queen's University	UUP
Edward Warburton Jones	City of Londonderry	UUP
Robin Kinahan	Belfast Clifton	UUP
Herbert Victor Kirk	Belfast Windsor	UUP
Frederick Lloyd-Dodd	Queen's University	UUP
Thomas Lyons	North Tyrone	UUP
Elizabeth Maconachie	Queen's University	UUP
Brian Maginess	Iveagh	UUP
William May	Ards	UUP
Eddie McAteer	Foyle	Nationalist
Brian McConnell	South Antrim	UUP
William McCoy	South Tyrone	UUP
Dinah McNabb	North Armagh	UUP
Nat Minford	Antrim	UUP
Robert Moore	North Londonderry	UUP
Joseph Morgan	Belfast Cromac	UUP
Ivan Neill	Belfast Ballynafeigh	UUP
Robert Samuel Nixon	North Down	UUP
Roderick O'Connor	West Tyrone	Nationalist
Phelim O'Neill	North Antrim	UUP
Terence O'Neill	Bannside	UUP
James O'Reilly	Mourne	Nationalist
William Oliver	Belfast Dock	UUP
Dehra Parker	South Londonderry	UUP
Edward George Richardson	South Armagh	Ind. Nationalist ^{1}
Robert Simpson	Mid Antrim	UUP
Vivian Simpson	Belfast Oldpark	NI Labour
Charles Stewart	Queen's University	Independent
Joe Stewart	East Tyrone	Nationalist
Norman Stronge	Mid Armagh	UUP
Walter Topping	Larne	UUP
John Warnock	Belfast St Anne's	UUP
Harry West	Enniskillen	UUP

- ^1 Edward George Richardson elected as an Independent Nationalist, but joined the Nationalist Party on election.

== Changes ==
- 1958: Edward George Richardson joins the Nationalist Party grouping.
- 5 March 1959: David John Little elected for the Ulster Unionists in West Down, following the death of John Edgar Bailey.
- 28 May 1959: William James Morgan elected for the Ulster Unionists in Belfast Clifton, following the resignation of Robin Kinahan.
- 5 February 1960: William Craig elected for the Ulster Unionists in Larne, following the resignation of Walter Topping.
- 16 February 1960: Desmond Boal elected for the Ulster Unionists in Belfast Shankill, following the resignation of Henry Holmes.
- 9 July 1960: James Chichester-Clark elected for the Ulster Unionists in South Londonderry, following the resignation of Dehra Parker.
- 29 November 1960: Joseph Burns elected for the Ulster Unionists in North Londonderry, following the death of Robert Moore.
- 20 April 1961: Walter Scott elected for the Ulster Unionists in Belfast Bloomfield, following the resignation of Daniel Dixon.
- 22 November 1961: Sheelagh Murnaghan elected for the Ulster Liberal Party for Queen's University, following the death of Samuel Irwin.
- 2 March 1962: Death of William May, MP for Ards. This position remained unfilled at the time of the general election.
