= List of members of the 8th House of Commons of Northern Ireland =

This is a list of members of Parliament elected in the 1953 Northern Ireland general election.

All members of the Northern Ireland House of Commons elected at the 1953 Northern Ireland general election are listed.

== Members ==
Name	Constituency	Party
Jack Andrews	Mid Down	UUP
John Edgar Bailey	West Down	UUP
Basil Brooke	Lisnaskea	UUP
Joseph Connellan	South Down	Nationalist
Harry Diamond	Belfast Falls	Republican Labour
Daniel Dixon	Belfast Bloomfield	UUP
George Dougan	Central Armagh	UUP
Brian Faulkner	East Down	UUP
Patrick Gormley	Mid Londonderry	Nationalist
Francis Hanna	Belfast Central	Independent Labour
George Hanna	Belfast Duncairn	UUP
Robert Harcourt	Belfast Woodvale	UUP
Cahir Healy	South Fermanagh	Nationalist
Bill Henderson	Belfast Victoria	UUP
Eileen M. Hickey	Queen's University	Independent
Henry Holmes	Belfast Shankill	UUP
Alexander Hunter	Carrick	UUP
Samuel Irwin	Queen's University	UUP
Edward Warburton Jones	City of Londonderry	UUP
Liam Kelly	Mid Tyrone	Anti-Partition
Frederick Lloyd-Dodd	Queen's University	UUP
Thomas Lyons	North Tyrone	UUP
Elizabeth Maconachie	Queen's University	UUP
Brian Maginess	Iveagh	UUP
William May	Ards	UUP
Eddie McAteer	Foyle	Nationalist
William McCleery	North Antrim	UUP
Brian McConnell	South Antrim	UUP
William McCoy	South Tyrone	UUP
Charles McGleenan	South Armagh	Anti-Partition
Dinah McNabb	North Armagh	UUP
James McSparran	Mourne	Nationalist
Harry Midgley	Belfast Willowfield	UUP
Nat Minford	Antrim	UUP
Robert Moore	North Londonderry	UUP
Joseph Morgan	Belfast Cromac	UUP
Murtagh Morgan	Belfast Dock	Irish Labour
William James Morgan	Belfast Oldpark	UUP
Ivan Neill	Belfast Ballynafeigh	UUP
Thomas Charles Nelson	Enniskillen	UUP
Robert Samuel Nixon	North Down	UUP
Roderick O'Connor	West Tyrone	Nationalist
Terence O'Neill	Bannside	UUP
Dehra Parker	South Londonderry	UUP
Norman Porter	Belfast Clifton	Ind. Unionist
Samuel Rodgers	Belfast Pottinger	UUP
Robert Simpson	Mid Antrim	UUP
Joe Stewart	East Tyrone	Nationalist
Norman Stronge	Mid Armagh	UUP
Walter Topping	Larne	UUP
John Warnock	Belfast St Anne's	UUP
Archibald Wilson	Belfast Windsor	UUP

== Changes ==
- 8 May 1954: Harry West elected for the Unionists in Enniskillen, following the death of Thomas Charles Nelson.
- 15 October 1955: Isaac Hawthorne elected for the Unionists in Central Armagh, following the death of George Dougan.
- 15 November 1955: Neville Martin elected for the Unionists in Belfast Woodvale, following the resignation of Robert Harcourt.
- 23 November 1956: Herbert Victor Kirk elected for the Unionists in Belfast Windsor, following the resignation of Archibald Wilson.
- 4 December 1956: William Fitzsimmons elected for the Unionists in Belfast Duncairn, following the resignation of George Hanna.
- 29 April 1957: Death of Harry Midgley.
- 30 October 1957: Death of William McCleery.
