= List of members of the 10th House of Commons of Northern Ireland =

This is a list of members of Parliament elected in the 1962 Northern Ireland general election.

All members of the Northern Ireland House of Commons elected at the 1962 Northern Ireland general election are listed.

== Members ==
| Name | Constituency | Party |
|---|---|---|
| John Andrews | Mid Down | UUP |
| David Bleakley | Belfast Victoria | NI Labour |
| Desmond Boal | Belfast Shankill | UUP |
| Billy Boyd | Belfast Woodvale | NI Labour |
| Tom Boyd | Belfast Pottinger | NI Labour |
| Basil Brooke | Lisnaskea | UUP |
| Joseph Burns | North Londonderry | UUP |
| James Chichester-Clark | South Londonderry | UUP |
| Joseph Connellan | South Down | Nationalist |
| William Craig | Larne | UUP |
| Harry Diamond | Belfast Falls | Republican Labour |
| Brian Faulkner | East Down | UUP |
| Gerry Fitt | Belfast Dock | Irish Labour |
| William Fitzsimmons | Belfast Duncairn | UUP |
| Patrick Gormley | Mid Londonderry | Nationalist |
| Thomas Gormley | Mid Tyrone | Nationalist |
| Francis Hanna | Belfast Central | Ind. Labour Group |
| Isaac Hawthorne | Central Armagh | UUP |
| Cahir Healy | South Fermanagh | Nationalist |
| William Hinds | Belfast Willowfield | UUP |
| Alexander Hunter | Carrick | UUP |
| Edward Warburton Jones | City of Londonderry | UUP |
| Herbert Victor Kirk | Belfast Windsor | UUP |
| David John Little | West Down | UUP |
| William Long | Ards | UUP |
| Thomas Lyons | North Tyrone | UUP |
| Elizabeth Maconachie | Queen's University | UUP |
| Brian Maginess | Iveagh | UUP |
| Eddie McAteer | Foyle | Nationalist |
| Ian McClure | Queen's University | UUP |
| Brian McConnell | South Antrim | UUP |
| William McCoy | South Tyrone | UUP |
| Dinah McNabb | North Armagh | UUP |
| Nat Minford | Antrim | UUP |
| Joseph Morgan | Belfast Cromac | UUP |
| William James Morgan | Belfast Clifton | UUP |
| Sheelagh Murnaghan | Queen's University | Ulster Liberal |
| Ivan Neill | Belfast Ballynafeigh | UUP |
| Robert Samuel Nixon | North Down | UUP |
| Roderick O'Connor | West Tyrone | Nationalist |
| Phelim O'Neill | North Antrim | UUP |
| Terence O'Neill | Bannside | UUP |
| James O'Reilly | Mourne | Nationalist |
| Edward George Richardson | South Armagh | Nationalist |
| Walter Scott | Belfast Bloomfield | UUP |
| Robert Simpson | Mid Antrim | UUP |
| Vivian Simpson | Belfast Oldpark | NI Labour |
| Charles Stewart | Queen's University | Independent |
| Joe Stewart | East Tyrone | Nationalist |
| Norman Stronge | Mid Armagh | UUP |
| John Warnock | Belfast St Anne's | UUP |
| Harry West | Enniskillen | UUP |

== Changes ==
- 6 December 1962: William Kennedy of the Ulster Unionist Party replaced Joseph Morgan in Belfast Cromac.
- 1964: Harry Diamond and Gerry Fitt become founder members of the Republican Labour Party.
- 9 May 1964: Samuel Magowan of the Ulster Unionist Party replaced Brian Maginess in Iveagh.
- 30 June 1964: Austin Currie of the Nationalist Party replaced Joe Stewart in East Tyrone.
- 3 December 1964: Basil Kelly of the Ulster Unionist Party replaced John L. O. Andrews in Mid Down.
- 19 June 1965: John Dobson of the Ulster Unionist Party replaced David John Little in West Down.
