= List of members of the 11th House of Commons of Northern Ireland =

This is a list of members of Parliament elected in the 1965 Northern Ireland general election.

All members of the Northern Ireland House of Commons elected at the 1965 Northern Ireland general election are listed.

== Members ==
| Name | Constituency | Party |
|---|---|---|
| Austin Ardill | Carrick | UUP |
| Desmond Boal | Belfast Shankill | UUP |
| Tom Boyd | Belfast Pottinger | NI Labour |
| Roy Bradford | Belfast Victoria | UUP |
| John Joseph Brennan | Belfast Central | National Democratic |
| Basil Brooke | Lisnaskea | UUP |
| Joseph Burns | North Londonderry | UUP |
| John Carron | South Fermanagh | Nationalist |
| James Chichester-Clark | South Londonderry | UUP |
| Joseph Connellan | South Down | Nationalist |
| William Craig | Larne | UUP |
| Austin Currie | East Tyrone | Nationalist |
| Harry Diamond | Belfast Falls | Republican Labour |
| John Dobson | West Down | UUP |
| Brian Faulkner | East Down | UUP |
| Gerry Fitt | Belfast Dock | Republican Labour |
| William Fitzsimmons | Belfast Duncairn | UUP |
| Patrick Gormley | Mid Londonderry | Nationalist |
| Thomas Gormley | Mid Tyrone | Nationalist |
| Isaac Hawthorne | Central Armagh | UUP |
| William Hinds | Belfast Willowfield | UUP |
| Edward Warburton Jones | City of Londonderry | UUP |
| Basil Kelly | Mid Down | UUP |
| William Kennedy | Belfast Cromac | UUP |
| Herbert Victor Kirk | Belfast Windsor | UUP |
| William Long | Ards | UUP |
| Thomas Lyons | North Tyrone | UUP |
| Elizabeth Maconachie | Queen's University | UUP |
| Samuel Magowan | Iveagh | UUP |
| Eddie McAteer | Foyle | Nationalist |
| Ian McClure | Queen's University | UUP |
| Brian McConnell | South Antrim | UUP |
| Dinah McNabb | North Armagh | UUP |
| John McQuade | Belfast Woodvale | UUP |
| Nat Minford | Antrim | UUP |
| William James Morgan | Belfast Clifton | UUP |
| Sheelagh Murnaghan | Queen's University | Ulster Liberal |
| Ivan Neill | Belfast Ballynafeigh | UUP |
| Robert Samuel Nixon | North Down | UUP |
| Roderick O'Connor | West Tyrone | Nationalist |
| Phelim O'Neill | North Antrim | UUP |
| Terence O'Neill | Bannside | UUP |
| James O'Reilly | Mourne | Nationalist |
| Edward George Richardson | South Armagh | Nationalist |
| Walter Scott | Belfast Bloomfield | UUP |
| Robert Simpson | Mid Antrim | UUP |
| Vivian Simpson | Belfast Oldpark | NI Labour |
| Charles Stewart | Queen's University | Independent |
| Norman Stronge | Mid Armagh | UUP |
| John Taylor | South Tyrone | UUP |
| John Warnock | Belfast St Anne's | UUP |
| Harry West | Enniskillen | UUP |

== Changes ==
- 23 November 1966: Robert Wilson Porter of the Ulster Unionist Party was elected for Queen's University to replace independent MP Charles Stewart.
- 25 May 1967: Michael Keogh of the Nationalist Party was elected in South Down to replace Joseph Connellan.
- 22 March 1968: John Brooke of the Ulster Unionist Party was elected in Lisnaskea to replace his father, Basil Brooke.
- 16 May 1968: Albert Anderson of the Ulster Unionist Party was elected in City of Londonderry to replace Edward Warburton Jones.
- 6 November 1968: Richard Ferguson of the Ulster Unionist Party was elected in South Antrim to replace Brian McConnell.
