= List of members of the 7th House of Commons of Northern Ireland =

This is a list of members of Parliament elected in the 1949 Northern Ireland general election.

All members of the Northern Ireland House of Commons elected at the 1949 Northern Ireland general election are listed.

== Members ==
Name	Constituency	Party
Robert Brown Alexander	Belfast Victoria	UUP
J. M. Andrews	Mid Down	UUP
John Edgar Bailey	West Down	UUP
Thomas Bailie	North Down	UUP
John Milne Barbour	South Antrim	UUP
Basil Brooke	Lisnaskea	UUP
Irene Calvert	Queen's University	Independent
Thomas Loftus Cole	Belfast Dock	UUP
Malachy Conlon	South Armagh	Nationalist
Joseph Connellan	South Down	Nationalist
Harry Diamond	Belfast Falls	Socialist Republican
Herbert Dixon	Belfast Bloomfield	UUP
George Dougan	Central Armagh	UUP
Brian Faulkner	East Down	UUP
Erne Ferguson	Enniskillen	UUP
William Grant	Belfast Duncairn	UUP
Samuel Hall-Thompson	Belfast Clifton	UUP
Francis Hanna	Belfast Central	Independent Labour
Cahir Healy	South Fermanagh	Nationalist
Tommy Henderson	Belfast Shankill	Ind. Unionist
Eileen M. Hickey	Queen's University	Independent
Lancelot Curran	Carrick	UUP
Samuel Irwin	Queen's University	UUP
William Lyle	Queen's University	UUP
Thomas Lyons	North Tyrone	UUP
James Godfrey MacManaway	City of Londonderry	UUP
Brian Maginess	Iveagh	UUP
Patrick Maxwell	Foyle	Nationalist
William May	Ards	UUP
Eddie McAteer	Mid Londonderry	Nationalist
William McCleery	North Antrim	UUP
William McCoy	South Tyrone	UUP
Edward McCullagh	Mid Tyrone	Nationalist
Dinah McNabb	North Armagh	UUP
James McSparran	Mourne	Nationalist
Harry Midgley	Belfast Willowfield	UUP
Hugh Minford	Antrim	UUP
Robert Moore	North Londonderry	UUP
William James Morgan	Belfast Oldpark	UUP
Ivan Neill	Belfast Ballynafeigh	UUP
John William Nixon	Belfast Woodvale	Ind. Unionist
Roderick O'Connor	West Tyrone	Nationalist
Terence O'Neill	Bannside	UUP
Dehra Parker	South Londonderry	UUP
Samuel Rodgers	Belfast Pottinger	UUP
John Maynard Sinclair	Belfast Cromac	UUP
Joe Stewart	East Tyrone	Nationalist
Norman Stronge	Mid Armagh	UUP
Walter Topping	Larne	UUP
John Warnock	Belfast St Anne's	UUP
Archibald Wilson	Belfast Windsor	UUP
Robert Nichol Wilson	Mid Antrim	UUP

== Changes ==
- 1949: Socialist Republican Party dissolved; Harry Diamond thereafter sat as an independent.
- 24 October 1949: Thomas Charles Nelson elected for the Unionists in Enniskillen, following the resignation of Erne Ferguson.
- 15 November 1949: Frederick Lloyd-Dodd elected for the Unionists in Queen's University, following the death of William Lyle.
- 29 November 1949: George Hanna elected for the Unionists in Belfast Duncairn, following the death of William Grant
- 20 January 1950: Alexander Hunter elected for the Unionists in Carrick, following the resignation of Lancelot Curran.
- 4 April 1950: Robert Harcourt elected for the Unionists in Belfast Woodvale, following the death of John William Nixon
- 31 October 1950: Daniel Dixon elected for the Unionists in Belfast Bloomfield, following the death of Herbert Dixon.
- 6 December 1950: Charles McGleenan elected for the Anti-Partition League of Ireland in South Armagh, following the death of Malachy Conlon.
- 2 February 1951: Nat Minford elected for the Unionists in Antrim, following the death of Hugh Minford.
- 18 June 1951: Edward Warburton Jones elected for the Unionists in City of Londonderry, following the resignation of James Godfrey MacManaway.
- 10 December 1951: Brian McConnell elected for the Unionists in South Antrim, following the death of John Milne Barbour
- 31 January 1953: Death of John Maynard Sinclair.
