= List of members of the 5th House of Commons of Northern Ireland =

This is a list of members of Parliament elected in the 1938 Northern Ireland general election.

All members of the Northern Ireland House of Commons elected at the 1938 Northern Ireland general election are listed.

== Members ==
Name	Constituency	Party
Paddy Agnew	South Armagh	NI Labour
J. M. Andrews	Mid Down	UUP
John Edgar Bailey	West Down	UUP
John Milne Barbour	South Antrim	UUP
Dawson Bates	Belfast Victoria	UUP
Jack Beattie	Belfast Pottinger	Independent Labour
Arthur Black	Belfast Willowfield	UUP
Basil Brooke	Lisnaskea	UUP
James Brown	South Down	Ind. Unionist
Richard Byrne	Belfast Falls	Nationalist
Thomas Joseph Campbell	Belfast Central	Nationalist
George Anthony Clark	Belfast Dock	UUP
James Craig	North Down	UUP
Robert Corkey	Queen's University	UUP
John Clarke Davison	Mid Armagh	UUP
Herbert Dixon	Belfast Bloomfield	UUP
Alexander Donnelly	West Tyrone	Nationalist
William Dowling	Belfast Windsor	UUP
Rowley Elliott	South Tyrone	UUP
Erne Ferguson	Enniskillen	UUP
James Gamble	North Tyrone	UUP
Alexander Gordon	East Down	UUP
John Fawcett Gordon	Carrick	UUP
William Grant	Belfast Duncairn	UUP
Samuel Hall-Thompson	Belfast Clifton	UUP
Cahir Healy	South Fermanagh	Nationalist
Tommy Henderson	Belfast Shankill	Ind. Unionist Party
Alexander Wilson Hungerford	Belfast Oldpark	UUP
John Johnston	North Armagh	UUP
Robert James Johnstone	Queen's University	UUP
George Leeke	Mid Londonderry	Nationalist
Robert Lynn	North Antrim	UUP
Brian Maginess	Iveagh	UUP
Patrick Maxwell	Foyle	Nationalist
Hugh McAleer	Mid Tyrone	Nationalist
John MacDermott	Queen's University	UUP
Hugh Minford	Antrim	UUP
Arthur Brownlow Mitchell	Queen's University	UUP
Robert Moore	North Londonderry	UUP
Henry Mulholland	Ards	UUP
Edward Sullivan Murphy	City of Londonderry	UUP
John William Nixon	Belfast Woodvale	Ind. Unionist
George Panter	Mourne	UUP
Dehra Parker	South Londonderry	UUP
John Patrick	Mid Antrim	UUP
Harold Claude Robinson	Larne	UUP
David Shillington	Central Armagh	UUP
John Maynard Sinclair	Belfast Cromac	UUP
Joe Stewart	East Tyrone	Nationalist
Frederick Thompson	Belfast Ballynafeigh	UUP
John Warnock	Belfast St Anne's	UUP
George Charles Gillespie Young	Bannside	UUP

== Changes ==
- 29 September 1938: Norman Stronge elected for the Unionists in Mid Armagh, following the resignation of John Clarke Davison.
- 5 December 1938: Howard Stevenson elected as a Unionist for Queen's University, following the death of Robert James Johnstone.
- 1938: James Brown accepted the Ulster Unionist whip.
- 30 March 1939: Death of George Leeke, MP for Mid Londonderry. This position remained unfilled at the time of the 1945 general election.
- 27 April 1939: William Lowry elected for the Unionists in City of Londonderry, following the resignation of Edward Sullivan Murphy.
- 10 November 1939: Malcolm Patrick elected for the Unionists in Bannside, following the death of George Charles Gillespie Young.
- 15 March 1941: George Dougan elected for the Unionists in Central Armagh, following the death of David Shillington.
- 27 March 1941: Thomas Bailie elected as an independent Unionist in North Down, following the death of James Craig.
- 2 July 1941: Michael McGurk elected as an independent Nationalist in Mid Tyrone, following the death of Hugh McAleer.
- 3 December 1941: Harry Midgley elected for the Northern Ireland Labour Party in Belfast Willowfield, following the resignation of Arthur Black.
- 2 April 1942: Eamon Donnelly elected as an independent Republican in Belfast Falls, following the death of Richard Byrne
- 19 October 1942: William Lyle elected as a Unionist for Queen's University, following the death of Arthur Brownlow Mitchell.
- 1942: Jack Beattie re-admitted into the Northern Ireland Labour Party.
- December 1942: Harry Midgley resigned from the Northern Ireland Labour Party and founds the Commonwealth Labour Party.
- 2 July 1943: John W. Renshaw elected as a Unionist for Queen's University, following the resignation of Robert Corkey.
- 11 August 1943: Thomas Lyons elected for the Unionists in North Tyrone, following the death of James Gamble.
- 26 August 1943: John Dermot Campbell elected for the Unionists in Carrick, following the resignation of John Fawcett Gordon.
- 1943: Jack Beattie resigned from the Northern Ireland Labour Party to sit as an independent Labour MP.
- 13 December 1944: Herbert Quin elected as a Unionist for Queen's University, following the resignation of John MacDermott.
- 29 December 1944: Death of Eamon Donnelly, MP for Belfast Falls. This position remained unfilled at the time of the general election.
- 12 April 1945: William McCoy elected for the Unionists in South Tyrone, following the death of Rowley Elliott.
- 19 April 1945: Lancelot Curran elected for the Unionists in Carrick, following the death of John Dermot Campbell.
- 19 April 1945: Walter Topping elected for the Unionists in Larne, following the death of Harold Claude Robinson.
- 1945: Thomas Bailie accepted the Ulster Unionist Party whip.
