= John Campbell (Irish surgeon) =

Northern Irish consultant surgeon and politician

Sir John Campbell FRCS (1862 – 31 August 1929) was a senior Northern Irish consultant surgeon and politician.

He was the son of the Reverend Robert Campbell and was educated at the Royal University of Ireland and later at the Rotunda Hospital and the London Hospital. During the First World War, he served in France as the chief surgeon at No. 5 British Red Cross Hospital.

He was a member of the Northern Ireland Parliament for Queen's University of Belfast from 1921 to 1929.

He was knighted in the 1925 New Year Honours. He died after a long illness at his house at Craigavad, County Down on 31 August 1929.

Parliament of Northern Ireland
New parliament	Member of Parliament for Queen's University of Belfast; 1921–1929; With: John Hanna Robb; Robert James Johnstone; Hugh Morrison	Succeeded by Robert Corkey; John Hanna Robb; Robert James Johnstone; Robert Norman McNeill
