= John Hanna Robb =

Barrister and politician from Northern Ireland

John Hanna Robb (4 November 1873 – 21 June 1956) was a Northern Irish barrister and Ulster Unionist Party politician.

The son of Rev. J. Gardner Robb, DD, LLD and Martha, daughter of Rev. John Hanna, of Ballymagowan House. Robb was born in Clogher and was educated at Royal Belfast Academical Institution, Queen's College, Belfast and called to the Bar at Gray's Inn and King's Inns, Dublin in 1898.

He was a Stormont MP for Queen's University from 1921 to 1937, following which he was Leader of the Senate of Northern Ireland and Minister for Education, becoming leader of the senate on 15 December 1937 until 1943. From 1939 to 1943, he was Father of the Northern Irish Bar. From 1943 until retirement in 1954 he sat as a County Court judge.

Robb lived at Deramore Park, North Belfast, with his wife Emily and their daughter.

Parliament of Northern Ireland
| New parliament | Member of Parliament for Queen's University of Belfast; 1921–1937; With: John Campbell 1921–1929; Robert James Johnstone 1921–1938; Hugh Morrison 1921–1929; Robert Corkey 1929–1943; Robert McNeill 1929–1935; Arthur Brownlow Mitchell from 1935 | Succeeded by Robert Corkey; John MacDermott; Robert James Johnstone; Arthur Brownlow Mitchell |
Political offices
| Preceded by Robert McKeown | Parliamentary Secretary to the Ministry of Education; 1925–1937 | Succeeded by Dehra Parker |
| Preceded by James Caulfeild | Minister of Education; 1937–1943 | Succeeded by Robert Corkey |
| Preceded by James Caulfeild | Leader of the Senate of Northern Ireland; 1937–1943 | Succeeded by Robert Corkey |
