= Robert Corkey =

Robert Corkey PC (NI) (1881 – 26 January 1966) was a Presbyterian minister, a professor of theology and a Unionist politician in Northern Ireland.

== Biography ==
He was born at Glendermott Parish, Waterside, Derry, the son of Rev. Dr Joseph Corkey. He was educated at Foyle College, Magee College, Queen's College, Belfast, the University of Edinburgh and Trinity College, Dublin. He was a Minister of the Presbyterian Church in Ireland at Ballygawley from 1906 to 1910 and Monaghan from 1910 to 1917; and then Professor of Ethics and Practical Theology at Assembly's College, Belfast from 1917 to 1951. He was Moderator of the General Assembly of the Presbyterian Church of Ireland from 1945 to 1946.

He was elected to the House of Commons of Northern Ireland from the Queen's University seat in 1929, and represented the university until his resignation on election to the Senate in 1943 (in which he served until 1965). He served as Assistant Parliamentary Secretary to the Ministry of Finance and Assistant Whip from 1942 to 1943. He served in Sir Basil Brooke's Cabinet as Minister of Education from 1943 to 1944, joining the Privy Council (Northern Ireland) on his promotion. He was Deputy Speaker of the Senate from 1952 to 1953 and from 1957 to 1958. He died on 26 January 1966.

Academic offices
Preceded by Samuel Law Wilson	Professor of Christian Ethics and Practical Theology of the Presbyterian Church in Ireland; 1917–51	Office abolished
Parliament of Northern Ireland
Preceded by John Campbell; John Hanna Robb; Robert James Johnstone; Hugh Morrison	Member of Parliament for Queen's University; 1929–1943; With: Robert Norman McNeill 1929–1935; John Hanna Robb to 1938; Robert James Johnstone to 1938; Arthur Brownlow Mitchell 1935–1942; John MacDermott from 1938; Howard Stevenson from 1938; William Lyle from 1942	Succeeded by John W. Renshaw; John MacDermott; Howard Stevenson; William Lyle
Party political offices
Preceded by Sir Norman Stronge	Unionist Assistant Whip; 1942–1943	Vacant Title next held by John Edgar Bailey
Political offices
Preceded by Sir Norman Stronge	Assistant Parliamentary Secretary to the Ministry of Finance; 1942–1943	Vacant Title next held by John Edgar Bailey
Preceded by John Hanna Robb	Minister of Education; 1943–1944	Succeeded by Samuel Hall-Thompson
Presbyterian Church titles
Preceded by Andrew Gibson (1944)	Moderator of the Presbyterian Church in Ireland; 1945	Succeeded by Thomas Byers (1946)
