= Ian McClure =

Ian McClure may refer to:

- Ian McClure (bowls) (born 1973), Irish bowler
- Ian McClure (politician) (1905–1982), Irish surgeon and politician
