= Frederick MacSorley =

Irish surgeon and politician

Frederick MacSorley or McSorley FRCPI (1892 – 9 February 1948) was a Belfast-based Irish surgeon and independent member of the House of Commons of Northern Ireland.

He unsuccessfully stood as an independent for Queen's University of Belfast before being elected in July 1945. His initial run for office was seen as encouragement for more Catholics to vote.

== Biography ==
MacSorley came from a middle-class Belfast Catholic family with deep clerical and medical connections – one brother was a member of the Redemptorist order, a sister a nun and several cousins and brothers also doctors. He was educated at St. Malachy's College and entered Queen's University Belfast. He qualified as a physician in 1916, took his doctorate of medicine in 1922. In 1930, he became a Fellow of the Royal College of Physicians of Ireland. He worked as a visiting physician at both the Mater Infirmorum Hospital and Belfast City Hospital for many years.

While still in office, he died at his home in Belfast, aged 56. He was survived by his wife, Jane Mary, and their six children, four sons, Rev. Liam MacSorley, Dr. Michael MacSorley, Rev Frederick MacSorley, and Dr. Eamon MacSorley, and daughters Maureen MacSorley and Kathleen MacSorley.

At his funeral, Bishop Daniel Mageean presided and the Archbishop of Armagh John D'Alton attended. Significantly, the Unionist Prime Minister of Northern Ireland Basil Brooke, 1st Viscount Brookeborough was represented by Mr W.N. McWilliam.

Parliament of Northern Ireland
Preceded by John W. Renshaw; William Lyle; Howard Stevenson; Herbert Quin	Member of Parliament for Queen's University of Belfast; 1945–1948; With: Howard Stevenson; Herbert Quin; Irene Calvert	Succeeded by Samuel Irwin; Howard Stevenson; Herbert Quin; Irene Calvert
