= Irene Calvert =

Northern Irish politician and economist (1909–2000)

(Lilian) Irene Calvert

Member of Parliament for Queen's University Belfast
- In office 1945–1953

Personal details
- Born: Lilian Irene Mercer Earls; 10 February 1909 Belfast, Ireland
- Died: 19 May 2000 (aged 91) Donnybrook, Dublin, Ireland
- Party: Independent
- Other political affiliations: Labour
- Education: Queen's University Belfast

Lillian Eileen Mercer Calvert (10 February 1909 – 19 May 2000), known as Irene Calvert, was a Northern Irish politician and economist who served as a Member of Parliament for Queen's University Belfast.

== Early life and education ==
Born in Belfast, as Lilian Irene Mercer Earls, she studied at Methodist College Belfast but for health reasons did not take examinations. Leaving school at the age of 18, she worked for some years in various stores, before going to Queen's University Belfast from 1933 to 1936 to study economics and philosophy.

== Career ==
In 1941, she was appointed to the vacant post of Chief Welfare Officer for Northern Ireland, immediately having to organise care for a flood of wartime evacuees including those evacuated to Northern Ireland from Gibraltar.

In 1944, Calvert, who had developed an interest in politics after her welfare work, was urged to contest a by-election for the Queen's University Belfast constituency to put a woman's point of view. She was unsuccessful but stood again in the 1945 Northern Ireland general election, as an independent candidate, and on this occasion succeeded in taking a seat. She held the seat until she stood down at the 1953 election. In Parliament, she refused to discuss the constitutional question, which she regarded as a distraction from the real task of social reform, including the passage of the Education Act (Northern Ireland) 1947. In her resignation speech, she did however question whether the Northern Irish economy could thrive while the partition of Ireland continued.

In 1950, Calvert began working at the Ulster Weaving Company as an economist, and having successfully helped build up their institutional sales was appointed a managing director. In 1956 she was invited to become a group chairman at the Duke of Edinburgh's Study Conference on Industry. She also served on the Belfast City Chamber of Commerce, becoming its first (and indeed only) woman president in 1965 and 1966. She also served on Queen's University's Senate and Board of Curators, and was active in The Irish Association for Cultural, Economic and Social Relations.

In 1964, she took up the position of executive manager (subsequently development manager) of the parent company of Great Southern Hotels and the Irish railway catering enterprise, a subsidiary of CIÉ, the State-owned transport authority. She worked there until early 1970. In 1970, she was briefly Head of Households for Doris Duke. She retired to Dublin, where she was an active supporter of the Irish Labour Party well into her eighties.

== Personal life ==
Calvert married Raymond Colville Calvert. They met in 1926 at the University Drama Society. He was a stockbroker and writer, including poems, ballads, and radio plays. He died suddenly 11 July 1959 in Bangor, County Down. They had a son Peter who was with his mother when she died. Calvert died at the Royal Hospital, Donnybrook, on 19 May 2000.

Parliament of Northern Ireland
Preceded by William Lyle; Howard Stevenson; Herbert Quin; John W. Renshaw	Member of Parliament for Queen's University of Belfast; 1945–1953; With: Frederick McSorley to 1948; Herbert Quin to 1949; Howard Stevenson to 1949; Samuel Irwin from 1948; Eileen M. Hickey from 1949; William Lyle 1949; Frederick Lloyd-Dodd from 1949	Succeeded by Elizabeth Maconachie; Samuel Irwin; Eileen M. Hickey; Frederick Lloyd-Dodd
