= Sinclair Irwin =

Rugby union player from Northern Ireland

- Full name: John Walter Sinclair Irwin
- Born: 3 August 1913 Ulster, Ireland
- Died: 13 August 2004 (aged 91) Belfast, Northern Ireland
- University: Queen's University Belfast
- Notable relative: Samuel Irwin (father)
- Occupation: Surgeon

Rugby union career
- Position: Back row
International career
Years	Team	Apps	(Points)
1938–39	Ireland	5	(5)

John Walter Sinclair Irwin (3 August 1913 – 13 August 2004) was an Irish international rugby union player.

Irwin was the eldest son of Ireland rugby international, politician and surgeon Samuel Irwin. He studied medicine at Queen's University Belfast, where he was a member of the varsity rugby team. A back row forward, Irwin also played for North of Ireland and was capped five times for Ireland.

Serving with the Royal Army Medical Corps in World War II, Irwin chose to remain in Dunkirk during the evacuation to assist the wounded and ended up being captured by the Germans.

Irwin was a vascular surgeon at the Royal Victoria Hospital, Belfast and stayed involved in rugby as an administrator. He served as president of the IRFU in 1969–70, becoming the first son of a former president to also hold the office.

== See also ==
- List of Ireland national rugby union players
