= Edith Taggart =

Edith Ashover Taggart (11 November 1909 – 1997) was a unionist politician in Northern Ireland.

Born Edith Hind in Nottingham in England, she was the niece of J. M. Andrews who became a prominent unionist politician in Northern Ireland. She was educated at the Eastbourne School of Domestic Economy. She married Thibeaudeau Taggart and the couple had three children. She was appointed as life president of the Unitarian Presbyterian Women's League.

Taggart was elected as an Ulster Unionist Party member of the Senate of Northern Ireland in 1970, becoming only the second female member of the body (after Marion Greeves). She served until its abolition in 1973.
