= Ian McClure (politician) =

North Irish politician (1905–1982)

Harold Ian McClure (1905–9 January 1982), known as Ian McClure, was a surgeon and politician in Northern Ireland.

Born in Dundonald, McClure studied at Campbell College, then at Queen's University, Belfast. He first graduated in medicine, then in pathology, bacteriology and biochemistry. In 1932, he became a Fellow of the Royal College of Surgeons of Edinburgh, and in 1944, a Fellow of the Royal College of Obstetricians and Gynaecologists. In 1937, he began lecturing at Queen's.

At the 1962 Northern Ireland general election, McClure was elected for the Ulster Unionist Party in the Queen's University seat. He held his seat at the 1965 general election, but it was abolished from the 1969 election. He was instead elected to the Senate of Northern Ireland, and served until it was prorogued in 1972.

Parliament of Northern Ireland
Preceded by Frederick Lloyd-Dodd; Charles Stewart; Sheelagh Murnaghan; Elizabeth Maconachie	Member of Parliament for Queen's University of Belfast; 1962–1969; With: Charles Stewart to 1966; Sheelagh Murnaghan to 1969; Elizabeth Maconachie to 1969; Robert Porter from 1969	Constituency abolished
