= Eileen M. Hickey =

Eileen Mary Hickey (1886 – 3 February 1960) was a politician in Northern Ireland.

Hickey studied at Queen's University Belfast, where she received a BSc, MD and DPH, before working as a civil servant at the Mater Hospital in Belfast. She became a member of the Board of Governors and was later President of the Ulster Medical Society.

In 1929, she was appointed clinical examiner in medicine at Queen's University, the first woman to hold the post. In 1945, she was appointed to the Advisory Committee for the Belfast Area under the Unemployment Act (Northern Ireland) 1934 (24 & 25 Geo. 5. c. 12 (N.I.)), while in 1949, she was appointed to the Irish National Health Council.

Hickey was nominated by Roman Catholic graduates of Queen's University as their candidate in the Queen's University, Belfast by-election, 1948, but was easily defeated by Samuel Irwin. She was again nominated for the Queen's University of Belfast constituency at the 1949 Northern Ireland general election and was elected this time. She served as an independent Member of Parliament. While there, she was viewed as a potential ally by the Anti-Partition of Ireland League MPs.

Hickey was re-elected in 1953 but stood down in 1958. A committee of the Parliament of Northern Ireland concluded that her Advisory Committee post constituted an office of profit under the crown, even though she never claimed or received any remuneration. This officially invalidated her elections.

Parliament of Northern Ireland
Preceded by Herbert Quin; Samuel Irwin; Howard Stevenson; Irene Calvert	Member of Parliament for Queen's University of Belfast; 1949–1958; With: Samuel Irwin 1948–1961; William Lyle 1949; Irene Calvert to 1953; Frederick Lloyd-Dodd from 1949; Elizabeth Maconachie from 1953	Succeeded by Charles Stewart; Samuel Irwin; Frederick Lloyd-Dodd; Elizabeth Maconachie
