= Queen's University of Belfast (Northern Ireland Parliament constituency) =

1921–1969 constituency of the Northern Ireland Parliament

- Former University constituency for the House of Commons of Northern Ireland
- Queen's University of Belfast Constituency

Former constituency
- Created: 1921
- Abolished: 1969
- Election method: Single transferable vote

Queen's University of Belfast was a university constituency of the Parliament of Northern Ireland from 1921 until 1969. It returned four MPs, on the electoral system of proportional representation by means of the single transferable vote. In 1969 the constituency was abolished under the reforms carried out by the Prime Minister of Northern Ireland Terence O'Neill.

== History ==
Queen's University Belfast was enfrachised in the House of Commons of the United Kingdom at Westminster under the Redistribution of Seats (Ireland) Act 1918 with a single-member university constituency. Under the Government of Ireland Act 1920, the Queen's University of Belfast constituency at Westminster retained representation and a new 4-member constituency elected by single transferable vote (STV) was created for the new 52-member House of Commons of Northern Ireland.

The first election to the new parliament took place in May 1921. Dáil Éireann, the parliament of the self-declared Irish Republic run by Sinn Féin, passed a resolution declaring that elections to the House of Commons of Northern Ireland and the House of Commons of Southern Ireland would be treated as the election for the Second Dáil. All those elected were on the roll of the Second Dáil, but as no Sinn Féin MP was elected for Queen's University, it was not represented there.

After the House of Commons (Method of Voting and Redistribution of Seats) Act (Northern Ireland) 1929, Queen's University was the only constituency in the Northern Ireland House of Commons to retain STV. Under the Representation of the People Act 1948, university constituencies at Westminster were abolished with effect at the 1950 general election.

The constituency was abolished under section 1 of the Electoral Law Act (Northern Ireland) 1968, which ended plural voting in Northern Ireland. This took effect at the 1969 Northern Ireland general election.

== Members of Parliament ==
Election	Member	Party	Member	Party	Member	Party	Member	Party
MPs (1921)	John Campbell	UUP	John Hanna Robb	UUP	Robert James Johnstone	UUP	Hugh Morrison	UUP
MPs (1929)	Robert Corkey	UUP	John Hanna Robb	UUP	Robert James Johnstone	UUP	Robert McNeill	Ind. Unionist
MPs (1935)	Robert Corkey	UUP	John Hanna Robb	UUP	Robert James Johnstone	UUP	Arthur Brownlow Mitchell	UUP
MPs (1938)	Robert Corkey	UUP	John MacDermott	UUP	Robert James Johnstone	UUP	Arthur Brownlow Mitchell	UUP
MPs (1938)	Robert Corkey	UUP	John MacDermott	UUP	Howard Stevenson	UUP	Arthur Brownlow Mitchell	UUP
MPs (1942)	Robert Corkey	UUP	John MacDermott	UUP	Howard Stevenson	UUP	William Lyle	UUP
MPs (1943)	John W. Renshaw	UUP	John MacDermott	UUP	Howard Stevenson	UUP	William Lyle	UUP
MPs (1944)	John W. Renshaw	UUP	Herbert Quin	UUP	Howard Stevenson	UUP	William Lyle	UUP
MPs (1945)	Frederick McSorley	Independent	Herbert Quin	UUP	Howard Stevenson	UUP	Irene Calvert	Independent
MPs; 1948	Samuel Irwin	UUP	Herbert Quin	UUP	Howard Stevenson	UUP	Irene Calvert	Independent
MPs (1949)	Samuel Irwin	UUP	Eileen M. Hickey	Independent	William Lyle	UUP	Irene Calvert	Independent
MPs (1949)	Samuel Irwin	UUP	Eileen M. Hickey	Independent	Frederick Lloyd-Dodd	UUP	Irene Calvert	Independent
MPs (1953)	Samuel Irwin	UUP	Eileen M. Hickey	Independent	Frederick Lloyd-Dodd	UUP	Elizabeth Maconachie	UUP
MPs (1958)	Samuel Irwin	UUP	Charles Stewart	Independent	Frederick Lloyd-Dodd	UUP	Elizabeth Maconachie	UUP
MPs (1961)	Sheelagh Murnaghan	Ulster Liberal	Charles Stewart	Independent	Frederick Lloyd-Dodd	UUP	Elizabeth Maconachie	UUP
MPs (1962)	Sheelagh Murnaghan	Ulster Liberal	Charles Stewart	Independent	Ian McClure	UUP	Elizabeth Maconachie	UUP
MPs (1966)	Sheelagh Murnaghan	Ulster Liberal	Robert Porter	UUP	Ian McClure	UUP	Elizabeth Maconachie	UUP

== Election results ==
=== Elections in the 1920s ===
1921 general election: Queen's University of Belfast (4 seats)
Party	Candidate	FPv%	Count		
Party	Candidate	FPv%	1	2	3
UUP	John Campbell	43.35	835		
UUP	John Hanna Robb	19.11	368	438	
UUP	Professor Robert James Johnstone	14.49	279	602	
UUP	Hugh Smith Morrison	12.62	243	296	564
Sinn Féin	Sean B. Dolan	10.44	201	204	204
Electorate: 2,528 Valid: 1,926 Quota: 386 Turnout: 76.19%

At the 1925 Northern Ireland general election, John Campbell, Robert James Johnstone, Hugh Morrison and John Hanna Robb were elected unopposed.

1929 general election: Queen's University of Belfast (4 seats)
Party	Candidate	FPv%	Count		
Party	Candidate	FPv%	1	2	3
UUP	John Hanna Robb	24.9	528		
UUP	Robert Corkey	24.0	510		
Ind. Unionist	Robert McNeill	20.8	441		
UUP	Robert James Johnstone	16.0	340	397	438
UUP	Arthur Brownlow Mitchell	14.2	302	348	392
Electorate: 3,324 Valid: 2,121 Quota: 425 Turnout: 63.8%

=== Elections in the 1930s ===
1933 general election: Queen's University of Belfast (4 seats)
Party	Candidate	FPv%	Count	
Party	Candidate	FPv%	1	2
UUP	Robert James Johnstone	29.5	695	
UUP	Robert Corkey	21.7	512	
UUP	John Hanna Robb	19.1	451	472
Ind. Unionist	Robert McNeill	15.6	368	604
Independent	Frederick McSorley	14.0	331	337
Electorate: 3,800 Valid: 2,357 Quota: 472 Turnout: 62.0%

At the 1935 Queen's University of Belfast by-election, Arthur Brownlow Mitchell was elected unopposed.

1938 general election: Queen's University of Belfast (4 seats)
Party	Candidate	FPv%	%	Seat	Count
UUP	Robert Corkey	608	24.8	1	1
UUP	Robert James Johnstone	600	24.5	2	1
UUP	Arthur Brownlow Mitchell	369	14.7	3	5
Independent	Frederick McSorley	359			5
Ind. Unionist	S. Sims	259	10.6		3
UUP	John MacDermott	253	10.3	4	5
Turnout		2,448	61.1	– 0.9	

At the 1938 Queen's University of Belfast by-election, Howard Stevenson was elected unopposed.

=== Elections in the 1940s ===
At the 1942 Queen's University of Belfast by-election, William Lyle was elected unopposed.

At the 1943 Queen's University of Belfast by-election, John W. Renshaw was elected unopposed.

1944 Queen's University of Belfast by-election
Party	Candidate	Votes	%	±%
UUP	Herbert Quin	1,178	53.6	−20.7
Independent	Irene Calvert	1,020	46.4	N/A
Majority		158	71.8	
Turnout		2,198	46.7	– 14.4
UUP hold		Swing	N/A	

1945 general election: Queen's University of Belfast (4 seats)
Party	Candidate	FPv%	%	Seat	Count
Independent	Frederick McSorley	649	21.6	1	1
UUP	Howard Stevenson	580	19.3	2	1
Independent	Irene Calvert	570	18.9	3	1
UUP	Herbert Quin	535	17.8	4	3
UUP	E. B. Wallace	286	9.5		3
UUP	William Lyle	279	9.3		3
Ind. Unionist	S. Sims	109	3.6		2
Turnout		3,008	59.1	– 2.0	

1948 Queen's University of Belfast by-election
Party	Candidate	Votes	%	±%
UUP	Samuel Irwin	2,735	70.8	+13.9
Independent	Eileen M. Hickey	1,126	29.2	N/A
Majority		1,609	41.7	
Turnout		3,861	57.4	– 1.7
UUP hold		Swing	N/A	

1949 general election: Queen's University of Belfast (4 seats)
Party	Candidate	FPv%	%	Seat	Count
UUP	Samuel Irwin	1,662	31.7	1	1
Independent	Eileen M. Hickey	1,073	20.5	2	1
Independent	Irene Calvert	955	18.2	3	3
UUP	E. B. Wallace	620	11.8		3
UUP	William Lyle	588	11.2	4	3
UUP	Howard Stevenson	339	6.5		2
Turnout		5,237	75.0	+ 15.9	

1949 Queen's University of Belfast by-election
Party	Candidate	Votes	%	±%
UUP	Frederick Lloyd-Dodd	2,100	54.0	−7.2
Ind. Unionist	N. S. Dickson	1,312	33.7	New
Independent	E. Reid	479	12.3	New
Majority		749	19.2	
Turnout		3,891	54.2	– 20.8
UUP hold		Swing	N/A	

=== Elections in the 1950s ===
1953 general election: Queen's University of Belfast (4 seats)
Party	Candidate	FPv%	%	Seat	Count
UUP	Samuel Irwin	1,840	32.9	1	1
Independent	Eileen M. Hickey	1,206	21.6	2	1
UUP	Elizabeth Maconachie	940	16.8	4	2
UUP	Frederick Lloyd-Dodd	706	12.6	3	2
Independent	R. Appleton	539	9.6		2
NI Labour	Sam Napier	297	5.3		2
Turnout		5,586	63.7	– 11.3	

1958 general election: Queen's University of Belfast (4 seats)
Party	Candidate	FPv%	%	Seat	Count
UUP	Samuel Irwin	1,640	28.3	1	1
Independent	Charles Stewart	1,218	21.0	2	1
UUP	Elizabeth Maconachie	1,131	19.5	3	2
Ulster Liberal	Albert McElroy	759	13.1		4
UUP	Frederick Lloyd-Dodd	706	12.2	4	4
NI Labour	S. J. Watt	345	5.9		2
Turnout		5,799	52.9	– 10.8	

=== Elections in the 1960s ===
1961 Queen's University of Belfast by-election
Party	Candidate	Votes	%	±%
Ulster Liberal	Sheelagh Murnaghan	2,622	52.5	+39.4
UUP	Samuel Rodgers	2,370	47.5	−12.5
Majority		252	5.0	N/A
Turnout		4,992	45.1	– 7.8
Ulster Liberal gain from UUP		Swing	N/A	

1962 general election: Queen's University of Belfast (4 seats)
Party	Candidate	FPv%	%	Seat	Count
UUP	Ian McClure	2,040	30.0	1	1
Ulster Liberal	Sheelagh Murnaghan	1,698	24.9	2	1
UUP	Elizabeth Maconachie	1,252	18.4	3	2
Independent	Charles Stewart	1,220	17.9	4	3
UUP	H. R. Brown	597	8.8		3
Turnout		6,807	53.8	+ 0.9	

At the 1965 Northern Ireland general election, Harold McClure, Elizabeth Maconachie, Sheelagh Murnaghan and Charles Stewart were elected unopposed.

1966 Queen's University of Belfast by-election
Party	Candidate	Votes	%	±%
UUP	Robert Porter	3,717	55.6	N/A
Ulster Liberal	Albert McElroy	2,968	44.4	N/A
Majority		749	11.2	N/A
Turnout		6,685	48.7	N/A
UUP gain from Independent		Swing	N/A	
