= Herbert Quin =

Unionist politician in Northern Ireland

Herbert Quin (1891 – 16 April 1968) was a unionist politician and barrister in Northern Ireland.

Quin studied at the Royal Belfast Academical Institution and Queen's University Belfast before joining the Irish Bar. He was also a chartered accountant. In 1944, he was elected as an Ulster Unionist Party MP for the Stormont seat of Queen's University. He stood down at the 1949 Northern Ireland general election but, the following year, was elected to the Senate of Northern Ireland, serving until his death in 1968.

Parliament of Northern Ireland
Preceded by John MacDermott; John W. Renshaw; Howard Stevenson; William Lyle	Member of Parliament for Queen's University of Belfast; 1944–1949; With: John W. Renshaw to 1945; Howard Stevenson 1928–1949; William Lyle to 1945; Frederick McSorley 1945–1948; Irene Calvert from 1945; Samuel Irwin from 1948	Succeeded by Eileen M. Hickey; Samuel Irwin; William Lyle; Irene Calvert
