= Thomas Nelson (Northern Ireland politician) =

Northern Irish politician (1888–1954)

Thomas Charles Nelson (1888–16 March 1954) was a unionist politician in Northern Ireland.

Nelson grew up in County Fermanagh, where he became the owner of a painting and decorating business, and served with the B Specials. He joined the Ulster Unionist Party and was elected to the Senate of Northern Ireland in 1945, serving until the 1949 Northern Ireland general election, when he was elected in Enniskillen and resigned his seat in the Senate. Nelson held his seat at the 1953 general election, but died early in 1954.

Parliament of Northern Ireland
Preceded by Erne Ferguson	Member of Parliament for Enniskillen; 1949–1954	Succeeded by Harry West
