= Joseph Morgan (politician) =

Northern Irish politician

Joseph William Morgan (1898 – 19 September 1962) was a politician from Northern Ireland.

Morgan ran a drapers' shop, but was also a Fellow of the Royal Geographical Society. He became active in the Ulster Unionist Party (UUP) and was elected at the 1953 Northern Ireland general election, representing Belfast Cromac. He held his seat at the 1958 general election, not having to face an opponent. After the election, he was appointed as the first Deputy Chairman of Ways and Means.

In 1960, Morgan was appointed to the Committee of Privileges, and also served on the Ulster Unionist Council. He again held his seat at the 1962 Northern Ireland general election, but died a few months later.

In his spare time, Morgan was an Orangeman and a member of the Apprentice Boys of Derry. He was also vice-president of Glentoran F.C.

Parliament of Northern Ireland
| Preceded by Maynard Sinclair | Member of Parliament of Northern Ireland for Belfast Cromac; 1953–1962 | Succeeded by John William Kennedy |
Political offices
| New office | Deputy Chairman of Ways and Means and Deputy Speaker of the Northern Ireland House of Commons; 1958–1962 | Succeeded by Brian McConnell |
