= Hugh Morrison (Northern Ireland politician) =

Northern Irish surgeon (1858–1929)

Hugh Smith Morrison (1858–1929) was a Northern Ireland surgeon and politician.

== Life ==
He was born in County Londonderry, the second son of Hugh Morrison J.P. of Moneydig. He was educated at Coleraine Academical Institution, and studied in the Royal University of Ireland, in Queen's College, Belfast and the College of Surgeons, Dublin. In 1884 he graduated M.D., with a diploma L.R.C.S.

Going into private medical practice in County Londonderry, Morrison was also involved in Unionist politics there. He lived at Aghadowey. He later became coroner for Coleraine. A Presbyterian, he was active in General Assembly meetings, and also took part in medical societies as a reformer. When Denis Henry, a Catholic, stood for the South Londonderry constituency in the Westminster parliament, Morrison endorsed him.

From 1921, Morrison represented for the as Ulster Unionist Party the Queen's University constituency, in the House of Commons of Northern Ireland and Stormont Parliament, and supported the introduction of the Special Powers Act 1922. In the debate on the Criminal Law Amendment Act (Northern Ireland) 1923, he commented on sexual morality in Belfast, as "a very dark picture" below the surface.

Morrison died at his home, Blackhill, Coleraine, on 21 May 1929.

== Works ==
- Modern Ulster, its Character, Customs, Politics and Industries (1920). Topics included the Orange Institution, Ulster Volunteers, and Irish Presbyterianism.

== Family ==
Morrison married in 1884 Louisa Jane Whitley, only daughter of the late David Whitley of Ballymena. They were both buried in the graveyard at Aghadowey parish church, as were two sons.
