= Elizabeth Maconachie =

Elizabeth Hamill Maconachie OBE (died 18 August 1989), known as Bessie Maconachie, was a unionist politician in Northern Ireland.

Maconachie studied at Queen's University Belfast, then worked as a schoolteacher. At the 1953 Northern Ireland general election, she was elected to the House of Commons of Northern Ireland as an Ulster Unionist Party (UUP) MP for the Queen's University of Belfast seat. One of only a very few women to serve at Stormont, she held her seat until its abolition in 1969. She was on the more liberal wing of the UUP, and favoured some reform.

Maconachie was a member of the National Federation of Business and Professional Women's Clubs of Great Britain and Northern Ireland, In the 1970s, Maconachie served as Chairman of the Unionist Society. She as appointed OBE in the 1976 New Year Honours.

Parliament of Northern Ireland
Preceded by Irene Calvert; Samuel Irwin; Eileen M. Hickey; Frederick Lloyd-Dodd	Member of Parliament for Queen's University of Belfast; 1953–1969; With: Eileen M. Hickey to 1958; Samuel Irwin to 1961; Frederick Lloyd-Dodd to 1962; Charles Stewart from 1958–1966; Sheelagh Murnaghan from 1961; Ian McClure from 1962; Robert Porter from 1966	Constituency abolished
