= Robert Porter (Northern Ireland politician) =

Northern Irish politician, barrister and judge

The Right Honourable Sir Robert Porter PC (NI), QC

Member of the Northern Ireland Parliament for Queen's University of Belfast
- In office 1966–1969
- Preceded by: Charles Stewart
- Succeeded by: constituency abolished

Member of the Northern Ireland Parliament for Lagan Valley
- In office 1969–1972
- Preceded by: constituency created
- Succeeded by: constituency abolished

Personal details
- Born: 23 December 1923 Derry, Northern Ireland
- Died: 25 May 2014 (aged 90)
- Party: Ulster Unionist (until 1972); Alliance (since 1972)
- Education: Queen's University Belfast

Military service
- Allegiance: United Kingdom
- Branch/service: Royal Air Force Volunteer Reserve (1943–1946); Territorial Army (1950–1956)
- Years of service: 1943 to 1946; 1950 to 1956
- Rank: Flying Officer; Captain
- Battles/wars: World War II; Cold War

The Rt. Hon. Sir Robert Wilson Porter, PC (NI), QC (23 December 1923 – 25 May 2014), was a Northern Irish politician, barrister and judge. He served as a pilot in the Royal Air Force during the Second World War and was later an officer in the Territorial Army.

== Early life ==
Porter was born on 23 December 1923 in Derry, Northern Ireland, to Joseph Wilson Porter and his wife, Letitia Porter. Always known by his nickname Beezer, Porter was educated at Foyle College, a state grammar school in Derry. He studied law at Queen's University Belfast which was interrupted by his military service during World War II. He returned to his studies in 1946 and graduated in 1949 Bachelor of Laws (LLB).

== Career ==
=== Military service ===
In 1943, he joined the Royal Air Force Volunteer Reserve, and served until 1946. He was posted to the Union of South Africa, where he trained and qualified as a pilot. He reached the rank of flight sergeant while serving with the other ranks. On 11 February 1945, he was commissioned into the Royal Air Force Volunteer Reserve as a pilot officer on probation. On 11 August 1945, he was promoted to flying officer (war substantive).

From 1950 to 1956, he served with the British Army. On 20 November 1950, he joined the Royal Regiment of Artillery, Territorial Army as a second lieutenant with seniority from 18 March 1947. He was later promoted to lieutenant, back dated to 20 November 1950. On 21 March 1952, he was promoted to captain. On 16 October 1956, he transferred to the Territorial Army reserve of Officers, thereby ending his military service.

=== Legal career ===
Porter was called to the Bar of Northern Ireland in 1950. During his early years as a practising barrister, he was also a part-time lecturer in law at Queen's University Belfast. He was appointed Queen's Counsel in 1965. From 1978 until 1995 Porter was a judge of the county courts.

=== Political career ===
He was active in the Ulster Unionist Party (UUP) before his election. In 1966 he was elected to the Parliament of Northern Ireland representing Queen's University. In January 1969 he served as Parliamentary Secretary to the Ministry of Home Affairs, after which he was appointed Minister of Health and Social Services. In March he became the Minister of Home Affairs and was also appointed to the Privy Council of Northern Ireland.

Within the Cabinet he was regarded as a moderate and declared that a broadening of the local government franchise called for primarily by nationalists was inevitable.

Porter's seat was abolished for the 1969 Northern Ireland general election, but he was able to win the new Lagan Valley seat. He resigned as Minister of Home Affairs in August 1970. He claimed to have resigned due to ill health, but he later complained that he had not been consulted about the British Army's imposition of the Falls Curfew on the Falls Road in July. He resigned from the UUP itself in June 1972 to join the Alliance Party of Northern Ireland.

== Later life ==
He died at the age of 90 on 25 May 2014 in Belfast. His funeral was held on 29 May at Holy Trinity Church in Ballylesson, Belfast.

== Personal life ==
Portor was a member of the Orange Order but resigned in 1971 because of his lodge's support of provocative Loyalist rallies.

Parliament of Northern Ireland
Preceded by Charles Stewart; Sheelagh Murnaghan; Ian McClure; Elizabeth Maconachie	Member of Parliament for Queen's University of Belfast; 1966–1969; With: Sheelagh Murnaghan; Ian McClure; Elizabeth Maconachie	Constituency abolished
New constituency	Member of Parliament for Lagan Valley; 1969–1973	Parliament abolished
Political offices
Vacant Title last held by William Fitzsimmons	Parliamentary Secretary to the Ministry of Home Affairs; 1969	Succeeded by John Taylor
Preceded by William James Morgan	Minister of Health and Social Services; 1969	Succeeded by William Fitzsimmons
Preceded by William Long	Minister of Home Affairs; 1969–1970	Succeeded by James Chichester-Clark
