= Charles Stewart (Northern Ireland politician) =

Barrister and politician in Northern Ireland

Charles Stewart QC (c. 1913 – 1985) was a barrister and independent politician in Northern Ireland.

== Career ==
Stewart was elected for the Queen's University of Belfast at the 1958 Northern Ireland general election. Independent politician Eileen M. Hickey, known for her Irish nationalist sympathies, had chosen not to contest the election.

Stewart retained his seat at the 1962 general election and was returned unopposed in 1965. He resigned in October 1966.

Following his resignation, Stewart was active as a magistrate into the 1970s and had been appointed Chief Justice of Cameroon in 1966 but quit his post in 1967.

Stewart died in 1985 at the age of 72.

Parliament of Northern Ireland
Preceded by Eileen M. Hickey; Samuel Irwin; Frederick Lloyd-Dodd; Elizabeth Maconachie	Member of Parliament for Queen's University of Belfast; 1958–1966; With: Samuel Irwin to 1961; Frederick Lloyd-Dodd to 1962; Elizabeth Maconachie to 1969; Sheelagh Murnaghan from 1961; Ian McClure from 1962	Succeeded by Robert Porter; Sheelagh Murnaghan; Ian McClure; Elizabeth Maconachie
