= Sheelagh Murnaghan =

Sheelagh Murnaghan OBE

Member of the Northern Ireland House of Commons
- In office 1961–1969
- Constituency: Queen's University of Belfast

Personal details
- Born: 26 May 1924 Dublin, Irish Free State (now Ireland)
- Died: 14 September 1993 (aged 69) Belfast, Northern Ireland
- Party: Ulster Liberal Party
- Education: Queen's University Belfast
- Profession: Barrister

Sheelagh Mary Murnaghan, OBE (26 May 1924 – 14 September 1993) was an Ulster Liberal Party Member of Parliament (MP) in the House of Commons of Northern Ireland at Stormont from 1962 to 1969.

== Early life ==
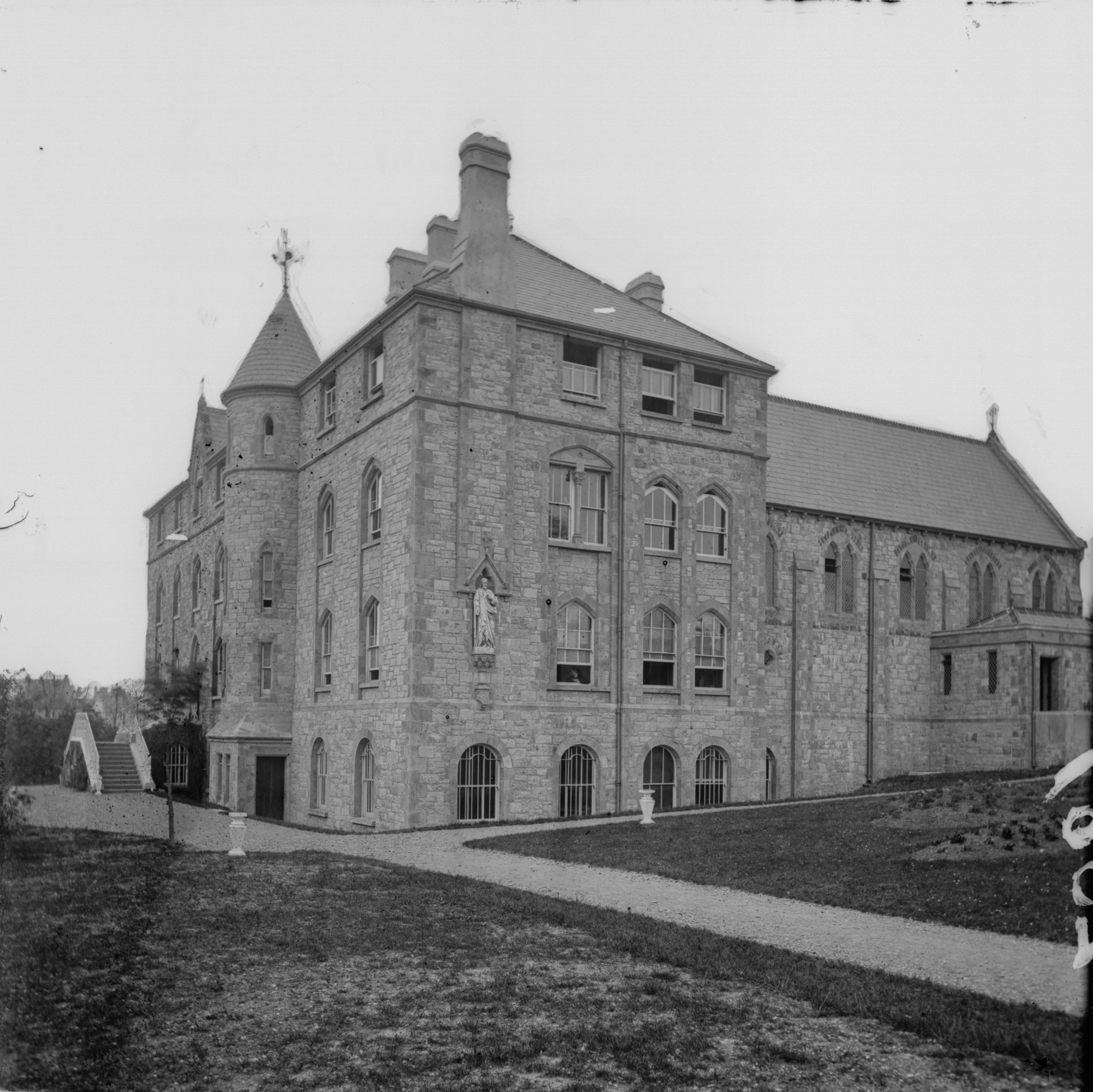
Loreto Convent, Omagh where Sheelagh was educated.

Sheelagh Mary Murnaghan was born on 24 May 1924 to Josephine Mary Morrogh and Vincent Hugh Murnaghan. She was the eldest of their six children. Her grandfather, George Murnaghan, was a well-known nationalist politician in Ireland. She was educated at Loreto Grammar School in Omagh, Loreto Abbey in Rathfarnham and studied law in Queen's University Belfast, graduating in 1947. While studying in Queen's University, Murnaghan also captained the hockey team from 1955 to 1956 and was the president of the Literary and Scientific Debating Society; also known as The Literific.

== Political career ==
After graduating from college, Murnaghan became "[one] of only nine women ever elected to the fifty-two-seat Stormont House of Commons during its fifty-year existence". She became a member of the Ulster Liberal Association in 1959 and finished her political career in November 1968 when the seat for Queen's University Belfast was abolished. "Sheelagh was seen as a slightly eccentric figure", according to Ruth Illingworth, during her time as a politician.

While an MP, Murnaghan campaigned to abolish the death penalty and for a bill of human rights. When her seat was abolished, she failed to win North Down at the 1969 Northern Ireland general election, and was also unsuccessful in Belfast South at the 1973 Northern Ireland Assembly election. During the 1970s, she sat on various quangos, including the Industrial Relations Tribunal and the Equal Opportunities Commission. She continued to practice at the Bar, specialising in harassment cases.

She died in 1993, aged 69, from undisclosed causes.

Parliament of Northern Ireland
Preceded by Samuel Irwin; Charles Stewart; Frederick Lloyd-Dodd; Elizabeth Maconachie	Member of Parliament for Queen's University of Belfast; 1961–1969; With: Frederick Lloyd-Dodd to 1962; Charles Stewart to 1966; Elizabeth Maconachie to 1969; Ian McClure from 1962; Robert Porter from 1966	Constituency abolished
