= Samuel Irwin =

Northern Irish politician and rugby union player

Sir Samuel Thompson Irwin CBE (3 July 1877 – 21 June 1961), often known as S. T. Irwin, was an Irish rugby player, surgeon and unionist politician.

Born in Claudy, County Londonderry, Irwin studied at Foyle College and Queen's College, Belfast. While studying, Irwin played for the Irish national rugby union team in nine Home Nations Championship matches, between 1900 and 1903, and he also played cricket to a high level.

In 1911, Irwin was elected as a fellow of the Royal College of Surgeons of Edinburgh, and began working at the Ulster Hospital for Children, where he developed an interest in orthopaedics, and he took up membership of the British Orthopaedic Association. He spent most of his career at the Royal Victoria Hospital, Belfast, but during World War I he worked at the Ulster Volunteer Force Hospital, serving in the Royal Army Medical Corps. He was the chair of the Northern Ireland Medical War Committee during World War II, and received the CBE for this work.

Irwin continued his sporting interests, and was elected President of the Irish Rugby Union in 1935, and was Captain of the Royal County Down Golf Club in 1947/8. On retirement from his medical post, he stood for the Ulster Unionist Party at a 1948 by-election for the Queen's University of Belfast seat, and held this until his death in 1961. Alongside this, he served on the senate of the university, and sat on a wide range of committees, including serving as President of the Central Presbyterian Association. He was knighted in 1957.

Irwin's son Sinclair Irwin also played rugby for Ireland and worked as a surgeon.

Parliament of Northern Ireland
Preceded by Frederick McSorley; Howard Stevenson; Herbert Quin; Irene Calvert	Member of Parliament for Queen's University of Belfast; 1948–1961; With: Howard Stevenson to 1949; Herbert Quin to 1949; Irene Calvert to 1953; William Lyle 1949; Eileen M. Hickey 1949–1958; Frederick Lloyd-Dodd from 1949; Elizabeth Maconachie from 1953; Charles Stewart from 1958	Succeeded by Sheelagh Murnaghan; Charles Stewart; Frederick Lloyd-Dodd; Elizabeth Maconachie
