= Archibald Wilson (Northern Ireland politician) =

Northern Irish politician (born 1905)

Archibald Ferguson Wilson (born 1905) was a Northern Irish politician.

Wilson was educated in Larne and was educated at the local grammar school. He became the director of a textile company. He joined the Ulster Unionist Party, and at the 1945 Northern Ireland general election stood in Belfast Windsor, winning a seat. He joined the Orange Order soon after election. He held the seat until 1956, when he stood down.
