= Ulster Liberal Party =

Defunct political party in Northern Ireland

- Founded: 1928 (established); 1956 (re-established)
- Dissolved: 1987
- Succeeded by: Alliance (membership)
- Ideology: Liberalism
- Political position: Centre
- British affiliation: Liberal Party
- Colours: Yellow

The Ulster Liberal Party was a liberal and non-sectarian political party in Northern Ireland linked to the British Liberal Party. The party was officially neutral on the constitutional position of Northern Ireland. Members expressed different views on the issue but agreed that Northern Ireland could only join the Republic of Ireland if that was the wish of the majority of the people of Northern Ireland.

== History ==
Active before the First World War, the Ulster Liberal Association sought to avoid a position on the question of Home Rule (the restoration of an Irish parliament in Dublin) which had seen Liberal Unionists split and join Conservatives in the Irish Unionist Alliance. In 1908, the Association dismissed the former Independent Orangeman and Liberal candidate for Mid Armagh in the 1906 parliamentary election, R. Lindsay Crawford as editor of its paper, Ulster Guardian, because it could not allow its pages "to be used directly or indirectly in support of devolution or Home Rule".

After the creation of Northern Ireland as a home-ruled division of the United Kingdom in 1921, the Association was restyled the Northern Ireland Liberal Association, and in May 1928 relaunched itself as the Ulster Liberal Party. It nominated candidates in the 1929 UK general election, including future Seanad Éireann member Denis Ireland and Unbought Tenants' Association MP George Henderson, before the party became inactive.

The party was re-founded by Albert McElroy in 1956, as (again) the Ulster Liberal Association. From 1961 to 1969, the party had one seat in the House of Commons of Northern Ireland, when Sheelagh Murnaghan held one of the four seats allocated to Queen's University, Belfast. It was represented on the committee of the Northern Ireland Civil Rights Association in 1967. As a party it sought to end sectarian divisions in Northern Ireland and Murnaghan tried on four occasions to pass a Bill of Rights in the Northern Ireland Parliament to address discrimination.

In 1969 Claude Wilton became a senator for the party in the Senate of Northern Ireland.

After 1970, it suffered the loss of many of its members to the Alliance Party of Northern Ireland. Its last political contest was the 1985 local government election, after which its last remnants joined the Labour '87 group. The Liberal Democrats, successor to the British Liberal Party, later formed links with the Alliance Party. There is also a small local party of the Liberal Democrats in Northern Ireland, who do not contest elections.

== Leadership ==
As of 1971, the party's president was McElroy, while John Quinn was the chair, and Berkley Farr was the secretary. Cecil Bell replaced Farr as secretary, and James Murray took over in 1979. From 1978 until 1982, the chair was Mervyn Cowan, the secretary was James Murray, and the position of president had been abolished. Patricia Cowan was the treasurer throughout.

== Electoral performance ==
=== Northern Ireland Parliament & Assembly elections ===
Year	No. of votes	Share of votes	Seats
1958	759	0.3%	0 / 52
1962	11,005	3.6%	1 / 52
1965	12,618	3.9%	1 / 52
1969	7,337	1.3%	0 / 52
1973	811	0.1%	0 / 78
1982	65	0.0%	0 / 78

=== United Kingdom House of Commons elections ===
Year	No. of votes	Share of votes	Seats
1959	3,253	0.6%	0 / 12
1964	17,354	2.7%	0 / 12
1966	29,109	4.9%	0 / 12
1970	10,929	1.4%	0 / 12
