= Walter Scott (Northern Ireland politician) =

Politician from Northern Ireland (born 1908)

Walter Scott (born 1908, date of death unknown) was a Unionist politician in Northern Ireland.

Scott worked as a building contractor, and was elected to Belfast City Council in 1959, for the Ulster Unionist Party. In 1961, he won a by-election in Belfast Bloomfield and was elected to the Parliament of Northern Ireland, holding his seat at each subsequent election, until the body was prorogued in 1972. From 1969 until 1972, he served as Chairman of Ways and Means and Deputy Speaker. He stood unsuccessfully as a pro-White Paper Unionist candidate in the election to the 1973 Northern Ireland Assembly.

Parliament of Northern Ireland
Preceded by Daniel Dixon	Member of Parliament for Belfast Bloomfield; 1961–1973	Parliament of Northern Ireland abolished
Preceded by Thomas Lyons	Chairman of Ways and Means and Deputy Speaker of the Northern Ireland House of Commons; 1969–1972	Parliament of Northern Ireland prorogued 1972, abolished 1973
