= George Dougan =

George Dougan (1891–1955) was a dispensary doctor and MP for Central Armagh in the Parliament of Northern Ireland. Dougan was elected to Stormont on 15 March 1941, replacing David Shillington.

Dougan practiced in Church Street, Portadown where he was a prominent Orangeman.
