= 1962 Northern Ireland general election =

General election held in Northern Ireland on 31 May 1962

- 31 May 1962

All 52 seats to the House of Commons of Northern Ireland 27 seats were needed for a majority
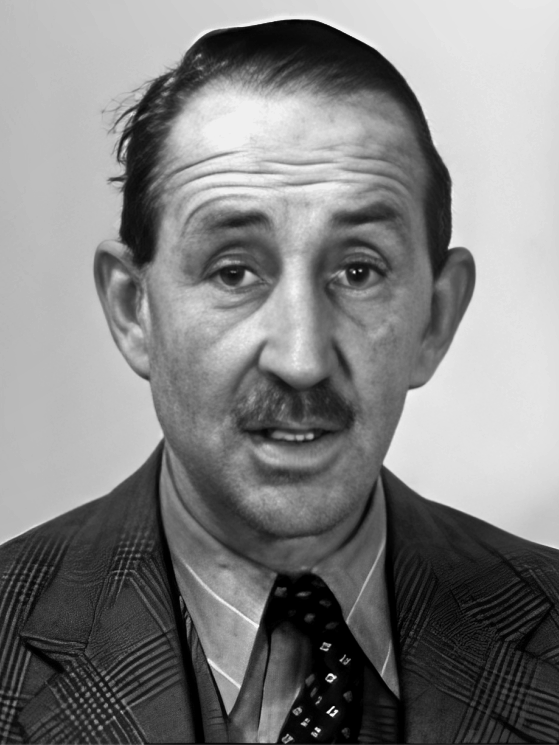
	First party	Second party	Third party
		Nat	NIL
Leader	Viscount Brookeborough	Joe Stewart	Tom Boyd
Party	UUP	Nationalist	NI Labour
Leader since	1 May 1943	1958	1958
Leader's seat	Lisnaskea	East Tyrone	Belfast Pottinger
Last election	37 seats, 44.0%	7 seats, 14.9%	4 seats, 15.8%
Seats won	34 (Note: Includes 20 members elected unopposed.)	9 (Note: Includes 3 members elected unopposed.)	4
Seat change	▼3	▲2	Steady
Popular vote	147,629 (Note: Voting only took place in 28 of 52 seats. The other 24 MPs were unopposed.)	45,860	76,842
Percentage	48.8%	15.1%	25.4%
Swing	▲4.8%	▲0.2%	▲9.6%
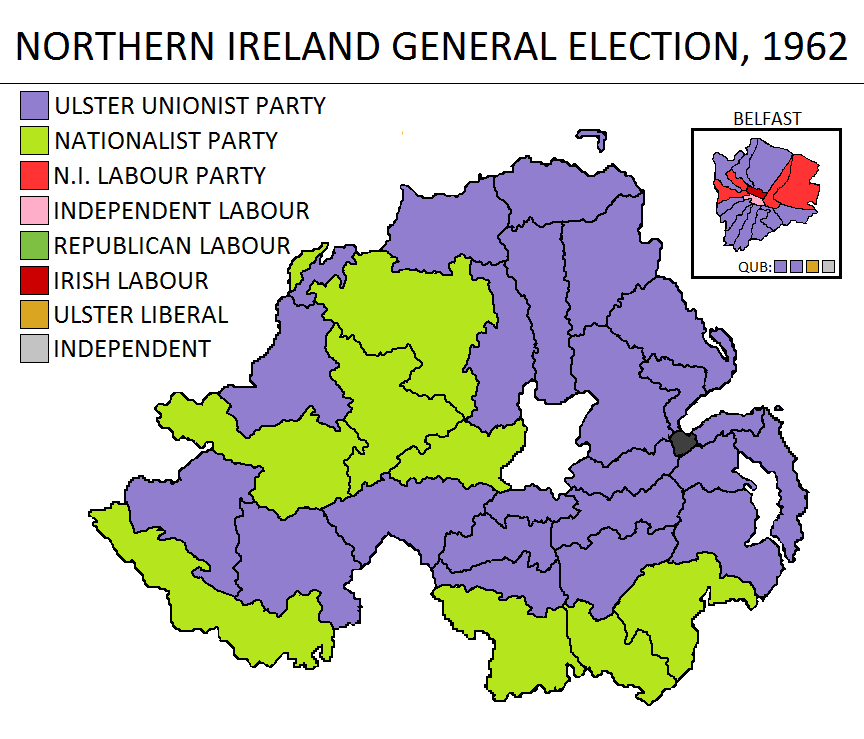
- Election results by constituency
Prime Minister before election
Basil Brooke
UUP
Prime Minister after election
Basil Brooke
UUP

The 1962 Northern Ireland general election was held on 31 May 1962. While the Ulster Unionist Party lost three seats, they retained a large majority as in all previous elections to the Parliament of Northern Ireland.

== Results ==
↓
34	9	4	5
UUP	Nationalist	Lab	Oth

1962 Northern Ireland general election
Party	Candidates						Votes		
Party	Stood	Elected	Gained	Unseated	Net	% of total	%	No.	Net %
UUP	45	34	0	3	-3	65.3	48.8	147,629	+4.8
NI Labour	14	4	0	0	0	7.7	25.4	76,842	+9.6
Nationalist	9	9	2	0	+2	17.3	15.1	45,860	+0.2
Ulster Liberal	4	1	1	0	+1	1.9	3.6	11,005	+3.3
Ind. Republican Labour	1	1	0	0	0	1.9	2.5	7,662	-0.6
Independent Labour	2	0	0	0	0	—	2.3	6,946	+0.3
Irish Labour	1	1	1	0	+1	1.9	1.1	3,288	-1.9
Ind. Labour Group	2	1 (Note: The only Independent Labour Group member was elected unopposed.)	0	0	0	1.9	0.8	2,343	-1.2
Independent	1	1	0	0	0	1.9	0.4	1,220	-1.4
World Socialist	1	0	0	0	0	—	0.0	66	N/A

All parties shown.
Electorate: 903,596 (458,838 in contested seats); Turnout: 66.0% (302,681).

=== Votes summary ===
Popular vote
Ulster Unionist	48.77%
Labour	25.39%
Nationalist Party	15.15%
Ulster Liberal	3.64%
Independent Labour	3.07%
Republican Labour	2.53%
Irish Labour	1.07%
Independent	0.4%
World Socialist	0.02%

=== Seats summary ===
Parliamentary seats
Ulster Unionist	65.38%
Nationalist Party	17.31%
Labour	7.69%
Ulster Liberal	1.92%
Independent Labour	1.92%
Republican Labour	1.92%
Irish Labour	1.92%
Independent	1.92%

== See also ==
- List of members of the 10th House of Commons of Northern Ireland
