= Robert James Johnstone =

Northern Irish physician and politician

Sir Robert James Johnstone (1872–1938) was a Northern Ireland physician and politician.

== Life ==
He was born at Greenisland, County Antrim on 4 January 1872, the son of Charles Johnstone, a farmer, and his wife Mary McCreavy. He studied at the Belfast Academical Institution and Queen's College, Belfast.

On qualifying, Johnstone took positions at Royal Victoria Hospital, Belfast, Queen's College, and as a pathology student in 1896. He was a medical student in London and Vienna.

Specialising in gynaecology, Johnstone then from 1900 worked as assistant to Sir John Byers, became surgeon to the Belfast Maternity Hospital and in 1902 had an appointment at the Royal Victoria Hospital. There he became a surgeon in 1908, and succeeded Byers as professor in 1921.

In 1921 Johnstone was elected as Ulster Unionist Party candidate to the Stormont Parliament for the Queen's University of Belfast constituency. In 1937 he was President of the British Medical Association, and in 1938 he was knighted.
