= 1953 Northern Ireland general election =

1953 general elections in Northern Ireland

- 22 October 1953

All 52 seats to the House of Commons of Northern Ireland 27 seats were needed for a majority
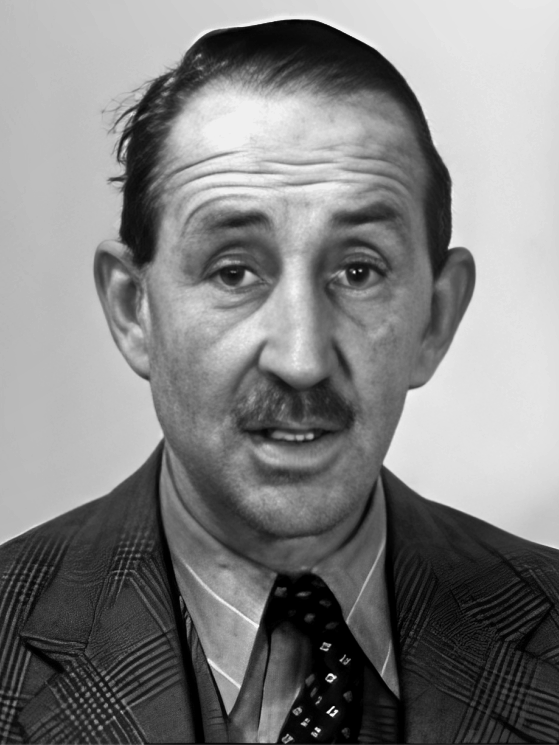

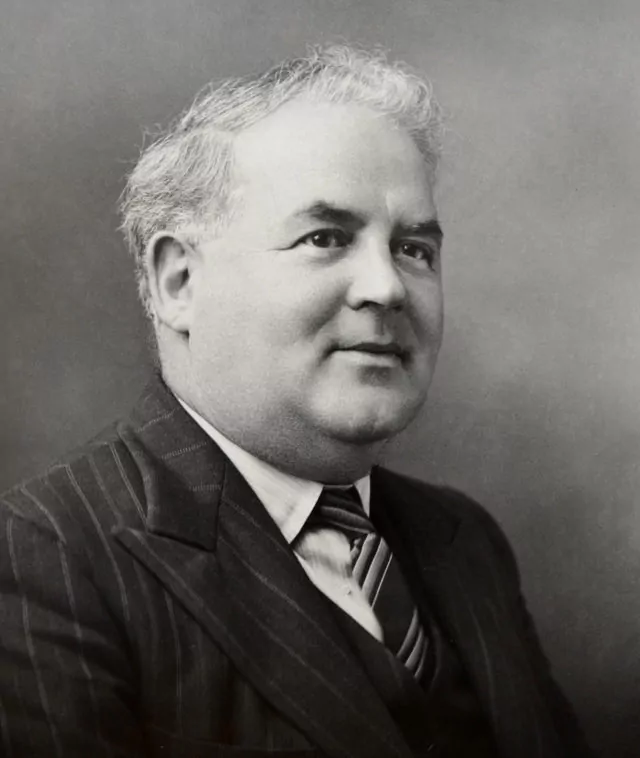
	First party	Second party
		Nat
Leader	Viscount Brookeborough	James McSparran
Party	UUP	Nationalist
Leader since	1 May 1943	15 November 1945
Leader's seat	Lisnaskea	Mourne
Last election	37 seats, 62.7%	9 seats, 26.8%
Seats won	38 (Note: Includes 21 members elected unopposed.)	7 (Note: Includes 3 members elected unopposed.)
Seat change	▲1	▼2
Popular vote	125,379 (Note: Voting only took place in 27 of 52 seats. The other 25 MPs were unopposed.)	27,796
Percentage	48.6%	10.8%
Swing	▼14.1%	▼16.0%
	Third party	Fourth party
	Ant
Leader	None (Note: Both of the successful Anti-Partition League candidates practiced abstentionism. As a result, the group had no leader in Stormont.)	William Norton
Party	Anti-Partition	Irish Labour
Leader since	n/a	19 July 1932
Leader's seat	None	Sat in Dáil Éireann
Last election	Did not contest	Did not contest
Seats won	2 (Note: Includes 1 member elected unopposed.)	1
Seat change	▲2	▲1
Popular vote	7,728	13,223
Percentage	3.0%	5.1%
Swing	New party	New party
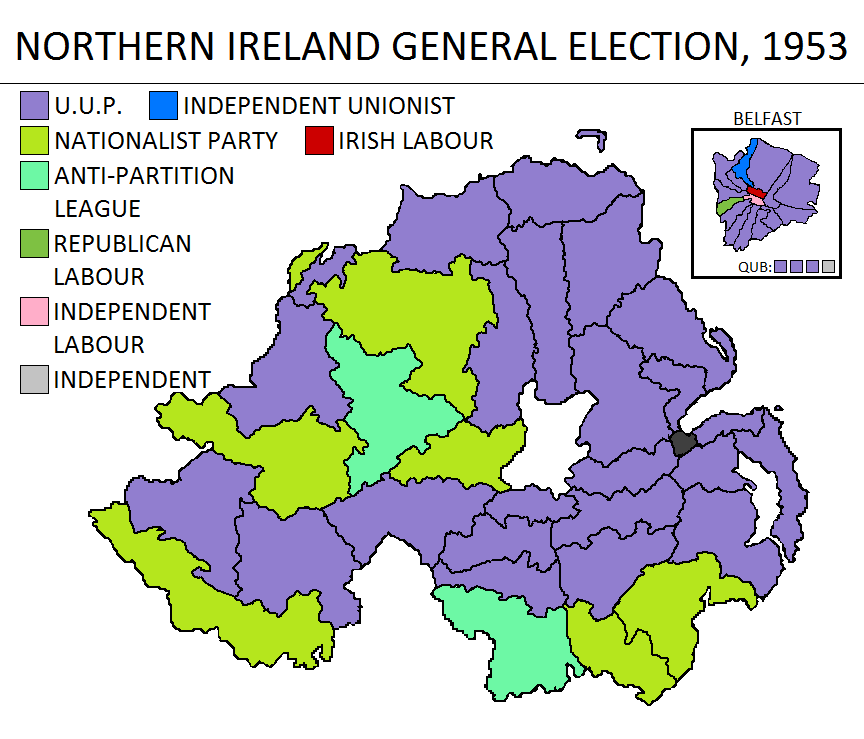
- Election results by constituency
Prime Minister before election
Basil Brooke
UUP
Prime Minister after election
Basil Brooke
UUP

The 1953 Northern Ireland general election was held on 22 October 1953. Like all previous elections to the Parliament of Northern Ireland, it produced a large majority for the Ulster Unionist Party.

== Results ==
↓
38	7	2	5
UUP	Nationalist	AP	Oth

1953 Northern Ireland general election
Party	Candidates						Votes		
Party	Stood	Elected	Gained	Unseated	Net	% of total	%	No.	Net %
UUP	43	38	3	2	+1	73.1	48.6	125,379	-14.1
Ind. Unionist	8	1	1	2	-1	1.9	12.8	32,998	+12.2
NI Labour	9	0	0	0	0		12.1	31,360	+5.0
Nationalist	8	7	0	2	-2	13.5	10.8	27,796	-16.0
Irish Labour	6	1	1	0	+1	1.9	5.1	13,223	N/A
Anti-Partition	3	2	2	0	+2	3.8	3.0	7,728	N/A
Independent Irish Labour	2	0	0	0	0		2.6	6,639	N/A
Ind. Republican Labour	1	1	1	0	+1	1.9	2.3	5,947	N/A
Independent Labour	1	1	0	0	0	1.9	1.5	3,902	-0.6
Independent	2	1	0	1	-1	1.9	0.7	1,745	+0.2
Communist (NI)	1	0	0	0	0		0.5	1,207	+0.3

All parties shown. Electorate 888,352 (428,216 in contested seats); Turnout 60.2% (257,924).

=== Votes summary ===
Popular vote
Ulster Unionist	48.61%
Independent Unionist	12.79%
Labour	12.16%
Nationalist Party	10.78%
Irish Labour	5.13%
Anti-Partition	3.00%
Independent Irish Labour	2.57%
Republican Labour	2.31%
Independent Labour	1.51%
Communist	0.47%
Independent	0.68%

=== Seats summary ===
Parliamentary seats
Ulster Unionist	73.08%
Nationalist Party	13.46%
Anti-Partition	3.85%
Independent Unionist	1.92%
Irish Labour	1.92%
Republican Labour	1.92%
Independent Labour	1.92%
Independent	1.92%

== See also ==
- MPs elected in the Northern Ireland general election, 1953
