= Frederick Lloyd-Dodd =

Northern Irish politician (1878–1974)

Frederick Thomas Lloyd-Dodd (1878 – 1 December 1974) was a Northern Irish politician.

Lloyd-Dodd was educated at the Queen's University of Belfast, obtaining a BSc in 1913, and an MSc in 1915. He worked at the Belfast College of Technology, becoming head of its department of commerce. He next became a professor at Queen's University of Belfast.

Lloyd-Dodd was active in the Ulster Unionist Party, and was elected for the Stormont constituency of Queen's University of Belfast at a 1949 by-election. He held the seat until he stood down at the 1962 Northern Ireland general election.

In the 1958 New Year Honours, Lloyd-Dodd was made a Commander of the Order of the British Empire, at which time, he was chairman of Ulster Savings Committee.
