= House of Commons of Northern Ireland =

Lower house of the Parliament of Northern Ireland

- Devolved Parliament
- Arms of Northern Ireland, 1924–1972

Type
- Type: Lower House of the Parliament of Northern Ireland

History
- Established: 7 June 1921
- Disbanded: 30 March 1972

Leadership
- Speaker: Various
- Leader of the Opposition: Various

Elections
- Voting system: Single transferable vote (1921–1929); First-past-the-post (1929–1972)
- First election: 24 May 1921
- Last election: 24 February 1969

Meeting place
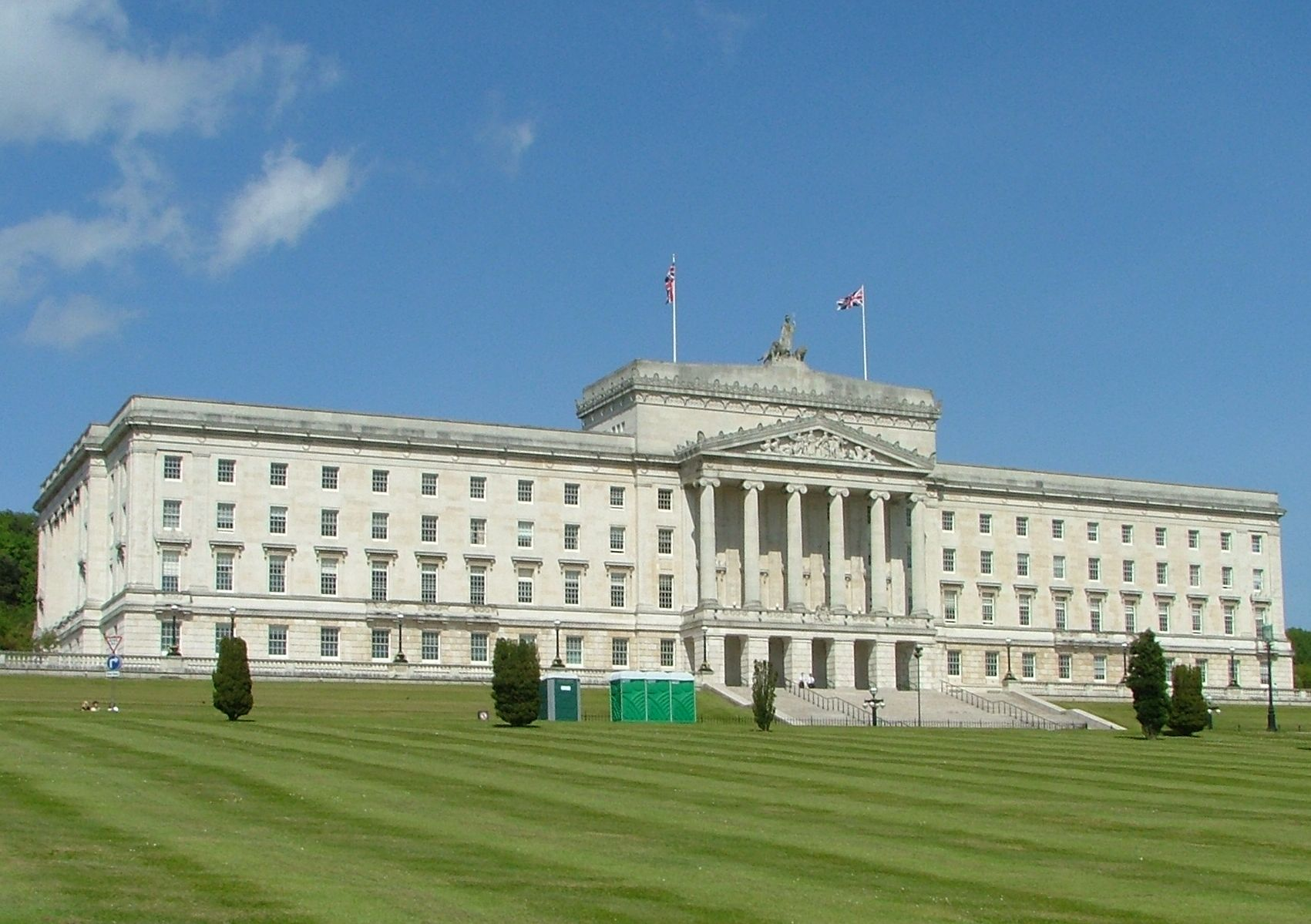
- Commons Chamber; Parliament Buildings, Stormont, Belfast

The House of Commons of Northern Ireland was the lower house of the Parliament of Northern Ireland created under the Government of Ireland Act 1920. The upper house in the bicameral parliament was called the Senate. It was abolished with the passing of the Northern Ireland Constitution Act 1973.

== Membership ==
The House of Commons had a membership of 52. On its establishment, 48 MPs were from territorial constituencies and 4 were for graduates of The Queen's University of Belfast. Under the Electoral Law Act (Northern Ireland) 1968, which took effect in 1969, the QUB seats were abolished and four extra territorial constituencies created on the outskirts of Belfast, where the population had grown.

== Functions ==
The House of Commons fulfilled the normal lower house functions to be found in the Westminster System of Government. Its roles were

- to grant Supply to the Government;
- to grant to or withdraw confidence from the Government;
- to provide a talent bank from which members of the Government could be chosen. The Prime Minister of Northern Ireland was chosen from its ranks by the Governor of Northern Ireland.

== Electoral system ==
The Government of Ireland Act required that elections to the House of Commons be by the single transferable vote (STV) electoral system first introduced in Ireland by the Local Government (Ireland) Act 1919. Its inclusion in the Government of Ireland Act 1920 was deliberate. It was intended to provide electoral opportunities for non-Unionists. (A similar legal requirement had been set for Northern Ireland's sister state, the non-operative Southern Ireland, and also existed in the Irish Free State.)

Under the Act the Parliament of Northern Ireland was given the legislative power to alter the electoral system from three years after its first meeting. The use of STV was criticised strongly among the grassroots of the governing Ulster Unionist Party, who viewed it as "un-British" (apart from four university constituencies, the rest of the United Kingdom used first past the post). The loss of eight seats by the UUP in the second parliamentary election caused a major row within the party. Rather than deal with questions as to why it faced declining popularity the party replaced STV by the non-proportional (and so less helpful to minorities) first past the post. However, STV was retained for the election of the four MPs from Queen's University.

== The Opposition ==
The creation of Northern Ireland had been opposed both by many Unionists and all Nationalists, all of whom, like Unionist leader Sir Edward Carson, were opposed to the partition of Ireland. While Unionists within Northern Ireland became reconciled to their form of home rule, Nationalists remained alienated from the structures of the state and pursued an abstentionist policy. The Nationalist Party, the main Nationalist party in Northern Ireland, which claimed descent from the pre-partition Irish Parliamentary Party, boycotted the Parliament entirely until 1925, and individual members boycotted at points thereafter. Other parties, notably the Northern Ireland Labour Party, did however take their seats. The absence of the main opposition party from parliament led to accusations of in effect "one-party rule".

For many years the most effective opposition came from various independent Unionists, most notably Tommy Henderson (served 1925–1953) who gave a near-ten-hour speech on the Appropriation Bill in May 1936.

== Procedure ==
In most of its activities, the House of Commons used the same procedure as the Parliament of the United Kingdom at Westminster. Each Parliament opened with a King's (or Queen's) Speech, though only George V in 1921 gave it in person. From 1922 the Speech from the Throne was delivered by the Governor of Northern Ireland. The Governor was the Crown's representative who formally summoned and prorogued Parliament. The Parliament emulated some of the more bizarre traditions, such as giving a first reading to the Outlawries Bill immediately after the Speech from the Throne as a token gesture of defiance of royal authority. The same sessional orders were then agreed relating to members returned for two constituencies.

Ministers spoke from a dispatch box in a chamber modelled on the British House of Commons chamber, though notably the benches and fixtures of the chamber were blue, rather than green. As at Westminster, members referred to each other in debate as "the honourable Member for the (X) division". Bills, introduced either in the Senate or the House of Commons, had to pass through first reading, second reading, committee stage, and third reading in both Houses to become law. With a very strict divorce law, the Parliament was often asked to deal with private bills promoted by divorcing couples. Because of the much smaller size of the House, only one member was required to act as a teller for each side during a division and they were counted among those voting in the division. The Parliament established virtually the same parliamentary and committee structure as Westminster.

However, the minimal workload of Parliament, and the small number of bills that required passage, meant that Parliament could hold short sessions and meet for short working hours. The workload was so small that a future Prime Minister, Terence O'Neill, later revealed that the then Prime Minister, Lord Brookeborough, did not even have a desk in his de facto residence, Stormont House. (Stormont House was nominally the residence of the Speaker of the House of Commons, but as speakers chose to live elsewhere, Prime Ministers used it as their residence, and turned their official residence, Stormont Castle, into an office for their senior civil servants.)

== Venue ==
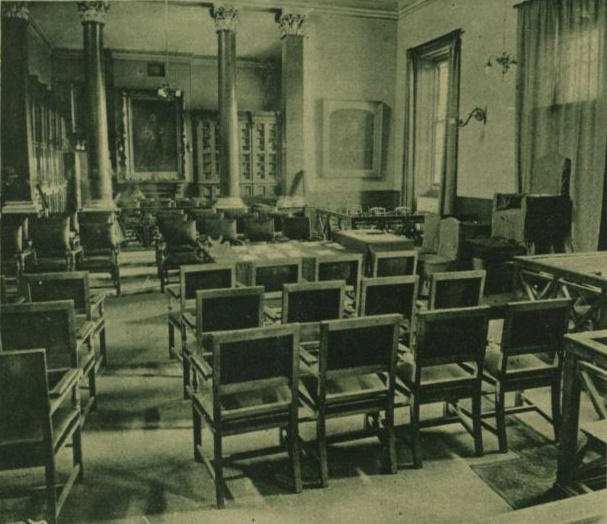
Chamber of the House of Commons when at Assembly's College, in 1921

The first assembly of the House of Commons occurred in Belfast City Hall in June 1921. King George V gave a famed address where he called for reconciliation between Irish people and for Northern Ireland to be free of discrimination against the minority.

For its first decade, Parliament met in the Presbyterian College, close to the City Hall, while new Parliament Buildings was built in East Belfast at a place called Stormont. The foundation stone at Stormont was laid by James Hamilton, 3rd Duke of Abercorn, 1st Governor of Northern Ireland, in the late 1920s. However, the Wall Street crash undermined the financial viability of the building project. Plans were scaled back, with plans for a ministerial building and a court building on site being abandoned. The main building was also changed, with plans for a United States Capitol-style dome being abandoned, leaving a plainer neoclassical structure. The new Parliament Buildings was officially opened by the Prince of Wales in 1932.

The House of Commons and Senate chambers were located across the Central Hall (nowadays usually known as the Great Hall) from each other, replicating the link between the House of Commons and British House of Lords in Westminster. Between them hung a large chandelier from Windsor Castle which had been given to the King by his cousin, Emperor Wilhelm II of Germany, but had been put in storage during the First World War and remained so until given to Stormont.

== General elections and composition ==
=== Key ===
- – Anti-Partition of Ireland League
- – Commonwealth Labour Party
- – Fianna Fáil
- – Independent
- – Independent Labour
- – Independent Labour Group
- – Independent Nationalist
- – Independent Unionist
- – Independent Unionist Association
- – Irish Labour Party
- – National Democratic Party
- – Nationalist Party (Northern Ireland)
- – Northern Ireland Labour Party
- – Republican (1923)
- – Republican Labour Party
- – Sinn Féin
- – Socialist Republican Party
- – Ulster Liberal Party
- – Ulster Unionist Party
- – Unbought Tenants Association

== Fathers of the House ==
Name	Entered House	Became Father	Left House	Party
J. M. Andrews	1921	1929	1953	UUP
Cahir Healy	1925	1953	1965	Nationalist
Lord Brookeborough	1929	1965	1968	UUP
Sir Norman Stronge	1938	1968	1969	UUP
Terence O'Neill	1946	1969	1970	UUP
Brian Faulkner	1949	1970	1972	UUP

The Parliament of Northern Ireland, including the House of Commons of Northern Ireland, was prorogued in 1972 and abolished completely in 1973 leaving the title of Father of the House defunct.

== Suspension and abolition ==
Northern Ireland was dogged by allegations of Unionist misrule, and political gerrymandering at local government level, during the 1960s. At this time there was increasing demand for civil rights, voiced primarily by the Northern Ireland Civil Rights Association, allegations of police misbehaviour by the Royal Ulster Constabulary and ultimately the outbreak of the Troubles. In 1972, using its legal powers under the Government of Ireland Act 1920, the British government prorogued (suspended) the Northern Ireland Parliament and Government initially for a year, before in 1973 abolishing it entirely with the Northern Ireland Constitution Act 1973. The Parliament last sat on 28 March 1972.

Parliament Buildings are now the seat of the Northern Ireland Assembly, a successor legislature.
