= Babington family =

English gentry family

Arms of Babington: Argent, ten torteaux in chief a label of three points azure

The Babington family is an Anglo-Irish and English gentry family. The Anglo-Irish branch of the family is still extant today.

== Origin of Babington name ==
Babington is a confluence of three words - Ba (likely a Saxon, or earlier Celtic name), ing (of Saxon origin) and ton (a settlement). So it means a settlement of the people or followers of Ba or Babba.

There are two places in England named Babington.

Babington, Somerset

The oldest (by reference) is Babington in Somerset, recorded in 1086 as Babingtone in the Domesday Book, and belonging to Bishop Geoffrey of Coutances.

Babington, Northumberland

The second settlement is Babington (now Bavington) in Northumberland; actually occurring as two hamlets, Little Babington and Great Babington. The Domesday Book does not include Northumberland but the area in 1086 was in the possession of the Norman Umfranville family. This Northumberland Babington settlement is first referenced in a charter in 1199, when it was given as part of a dower to relating to William Bertram (lived between 1177 and 1189) who married Alice, daughter of Robert de Umfranville.

Over the next 150 years the manor of Babington appears in charters as belonging to numerous individuals; Roger de Bertram (1255), William Swinmburne (1262), William de Echerwick (Great Babington, 1324), Robert de Umfranville (1325), Robert Pareyng (Great Babington, 1343), Robert de Umfranville (Great Babington, 1344-5), Alan le Strother (Great Babington 1532, 1381).

The Babington family's involvement with the settlement of Babington possibly goes back to Sir John de Babington of Little Babington, living around 1220, or even earlier. Sir John is the first Babington to appear in the family pedigrees, but his existence is not confirmed by other sources. His son Robert de Babington is cited in the "Great Pipe Roll for Northumberland...1248....as paying a fine....probably from a military levy". Two of Robert's sons then appear in charters; in 1271 when William de Babington is called of Little Babington, and in 1274 when Richard de Babington is called of Great Babington.

Given the preponderance of the other owners of Great Babington, it is likely that the Babington family were initially tenants of Little Babington. Given the earlier destruction of the Anglo-Saxon landowning class, it is probable that they were of Norman descent, but beyond this nothing else is known of their origins.

Bebington, Cheshire

There is also a settlement in Cheshire called Bebington, possibly named after the followers of one Bebba, as opposed to Babba. It first appears in 1093 as the 'Capella (chapel) de Bebington' in the settlement of Pontone. Pontone was subsequently renamed as Bebington, Cheshire.

== Babington family of England ==
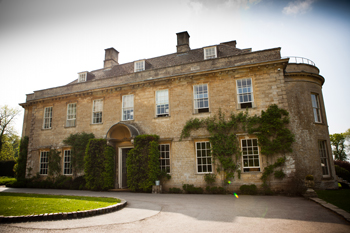
Babington House in Babington, Somerset, occupies the site of a former seat of the English Babington family.

The first Babington in the pedigree was Sir John de (of) Babington, Lord of Babington Parva (now Bavington). Sir John was alive in 1178 and 1220.

Sir John de Babington's origins are unknown. Some writers (Bigland) suggest that the Babingtons were Saxon. However the family's own tradition is that they were originally Norman. It was certainly common for Norman landowners to take the name of their Saxon fee, and the assertion that the Babingtons were Norman is supported by the Christian names of the first four generations being Norman rather than Saxon; John, Robert, William and Richard.

Sir John's grandchildren then split in the 13th century; this became the main break of the family. Sir Hugh Babington became Sheriff of Derby & Nottingham (1282), Cambridge & Huntingdon (1289) and Kent (1294). His and his descendants eventually settled in Gamlingay, Cambridgeshire. Other branches moved to York, Derby, Nottingham and Devon. Those of Rothley (Leicester) and Kiddington (Oxford) are then descended from the Derby house.

Sir John de Babington (1304-1353), a great-great-grandson of the first recorded Sir John, was Chief Captain of Morlaix in Brittany during the reign of King Edward III, and was buried in monastery of the White Friars at Morlaix. His son, Sir John de Babington (1335-1409) is said to have exclaimed in Norman French: 'foy est tout' ("faith is all"), on being chosen by King Henry IV for dangerous duty in France, which became the family's motto. His son, Thomas Babington of Dethick (c.1376-1464) served with King Henry V at the Battle of Agincourt. Thomas's son Sir John Babington of Dethick (1423-1485), was slain at the Battle of Bosworth in 1485 fighting for King Richard III. One of Thomas's other sons Sir William Babington (1370-1455) established a branch of the Babingtons at Chilwell and Kiddington.

Thomas Babington of Dethick (died 13 March 1518), son of Sir John Babington of Dethick and Isabel Bradbourne (1427-1486), and his wife Editha FitzHerbert (d. 1511), daughter of Ralph Fitzherbert, continued the family line at Dethick, as did Thomas's son Sir Anthony Babington (1476-1536). Thomas's fifth son, Humphrey Babington of Rothley Temple started the branch of the family who were seated at Rothley Temple.

The family were primarily landowners in Derbyshire (Dethick inheritance), Northumberland and Leicestershire. Family seats included Rothley Court, Dethick Manor, Chilwell Hall, Curborough Hall and Packington Hall. The family has routinely produced members who have successively occupied posts such as High Sheriff, Lord Lieutenant and Member of Parliament.

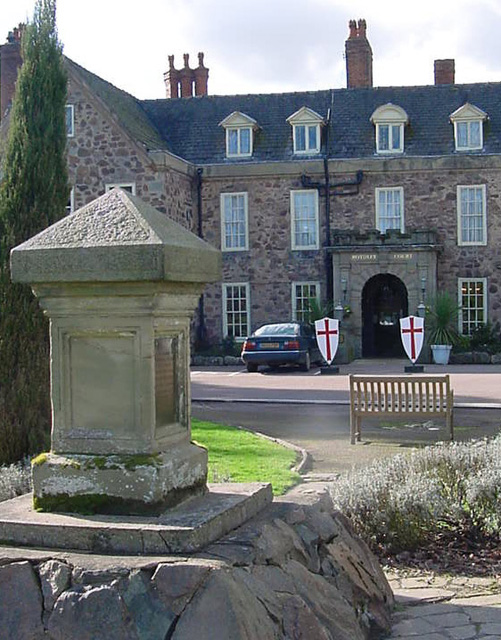
Rothley Court

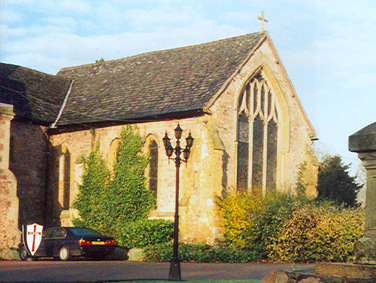
Rothley Temple

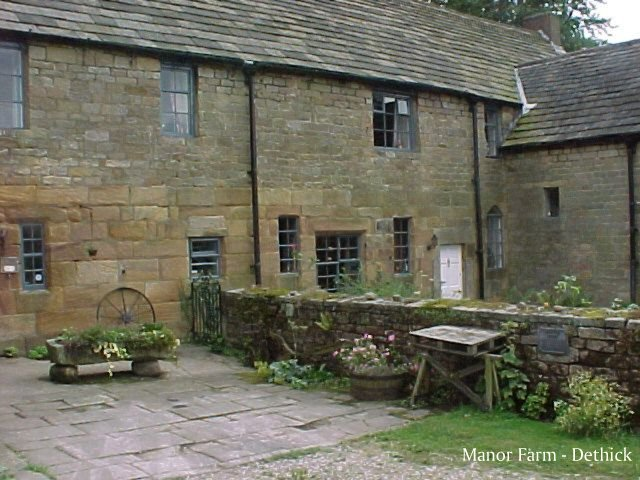
Dethick Manor

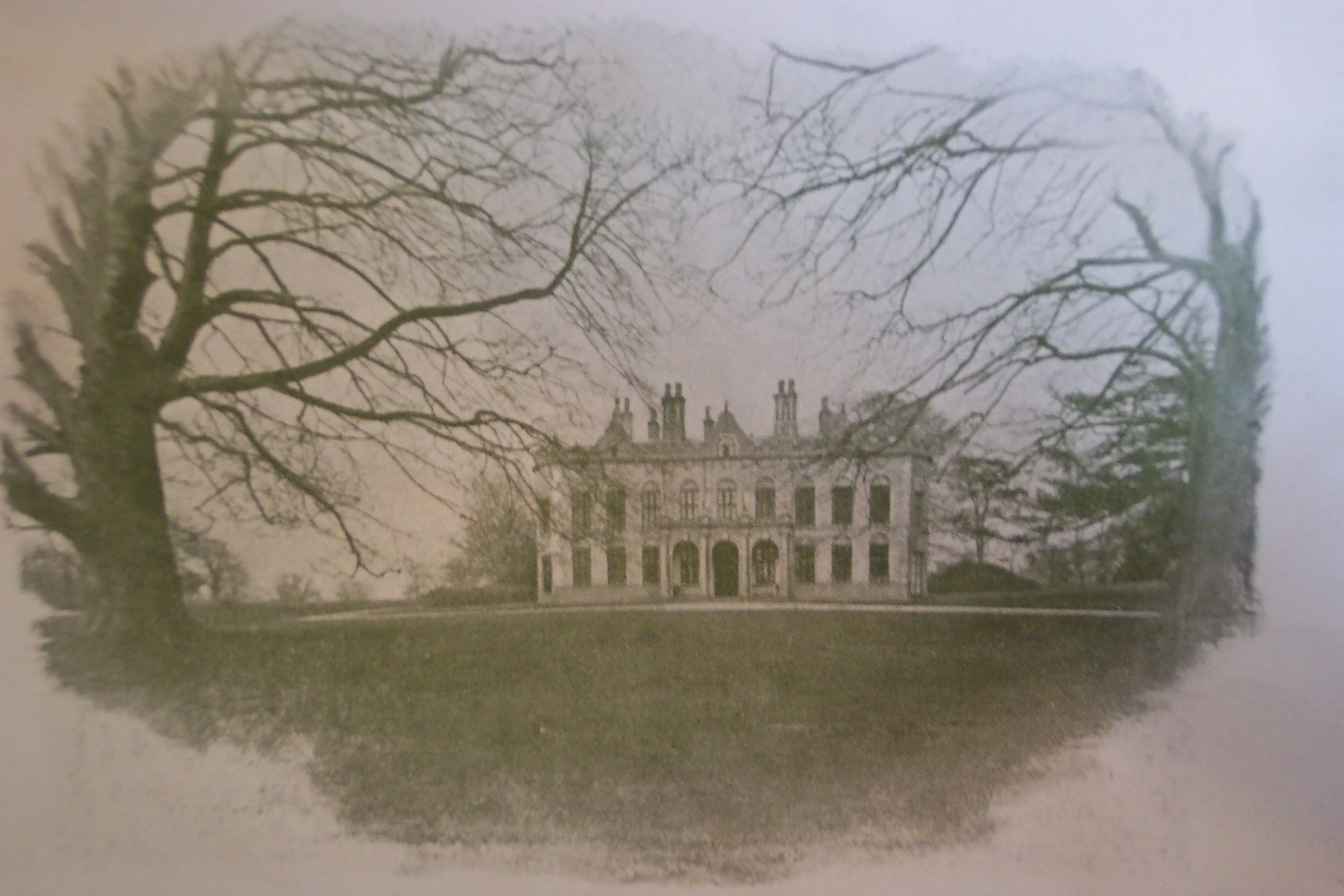
Packington Hall in Staffordshire

=== Babingtons of Chilwell and Kiddington ===
Sir William Babington, Chief Baron of the Exchequer, married Margery Martell and lived at Chilwell Hall. His son, William Babington (1393-1474) was High Sheriff of Nottinghamshire, Derbyshire and the Royal Forests in 1456. William (1339-1474)'s son was Sir John Babington (1425-1501), who fought for Richard III at the Battle of Bosworth alongside his cousin Sir John Babington of Dethick and for Henry VII at the Battle of Stoke Field, and his daughter was Etheldena Babington, who married Sir John Delves and whose daughter Ellen married Sir Robert Sheffield.

Robert Babington (1402-1464), another son of Sir William Babington, married Maulde Venour. His son William Babington (born circa 1442) was Warden of the Fleet Prison and Keeper of the Royal Palace of Westminster, both posts were successively held by this branch of the Babingtons.

Philip Babington (1632-1690), a descendant of William Babington (born circa 1442) was Governor of Berwick-upon-Tweed from 1689 to 1690 and Member of Parliament for Berwick-upon-Tweed from 1689 to 1690. William III of England described him as 'a very prudent and honourable man, and assuredly a very brave and excellent officer—even one of the best who have served me here of his nation'.

=== Babingtons of Dethick ===
The Babingtons inherited Dethick Manor (through the marriage of Thomas Babington (died 1464) to Isabel Dethick, daughter of Robert Dethick) on Robert's death in 1403. Thomas and Isabel (née Dethick) had two children: Sir John Babington of Dethick (see above) and William Babington, who was President of the Order of Saint Benedict in England. Sir Anthony Babington, Sir John (d. 1485)'s grandson who also held land at Kingston, was Member of Parliament for Nottingham from 1529-1536. Sir Anthony's son Thomas (d. 21 April 1560) by his first wife Elizabeth Ormond (d. 28 November 1505) was Justice of the Peace for Derbyshire in 1558 and married Katherine Sacheverell, with whom he had issue including Henry Babington (who married Mary Darcy, daughter of George Darcy, 1st Baron Darcy of Aston, who was mother to Anthony Babington and Maud Babington, who married Christopher Plunkett, 8th Baron of Dunsay, among others). Another son by Sir Anthony's first wife Elizabeth was Bernard, who was father to Rt. Rev Gervase Babington.

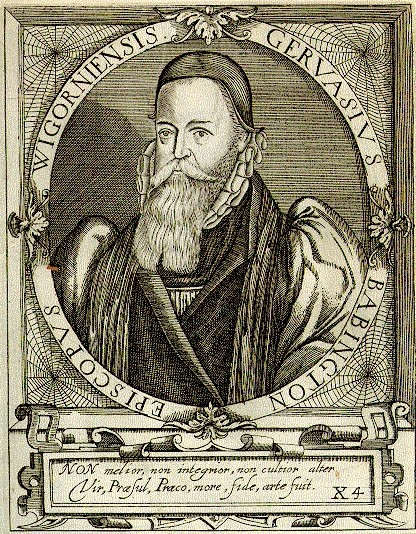
Right Reverend Gervase Babington.

=== Babingtons of Rothley Temple ===
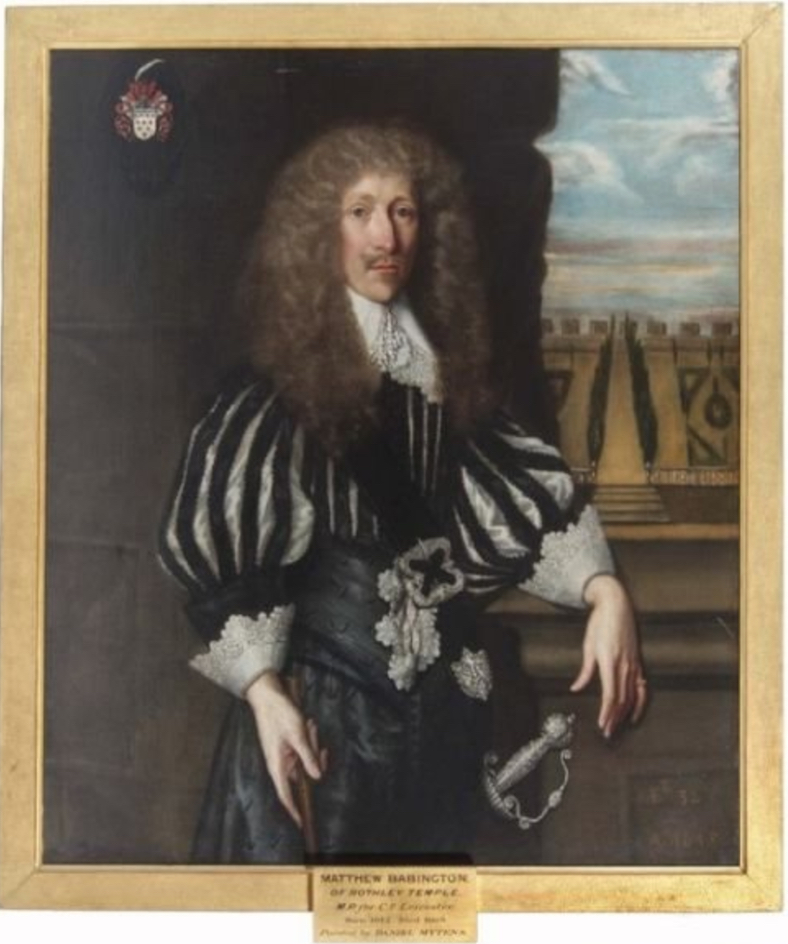
Matthew Babington of Rothley Temple (1612-1669), by Daniel Mytens

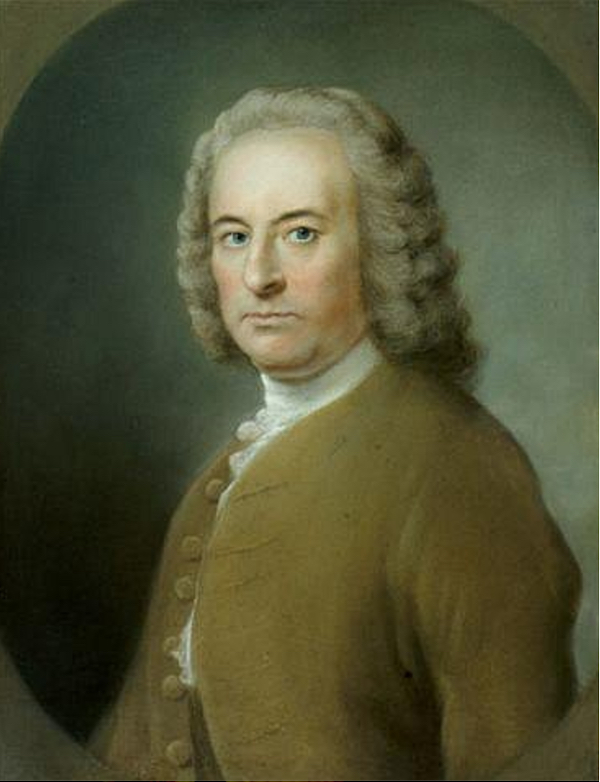
Thomas Babington of Rothley Temple (1715-1776), by George Knapton

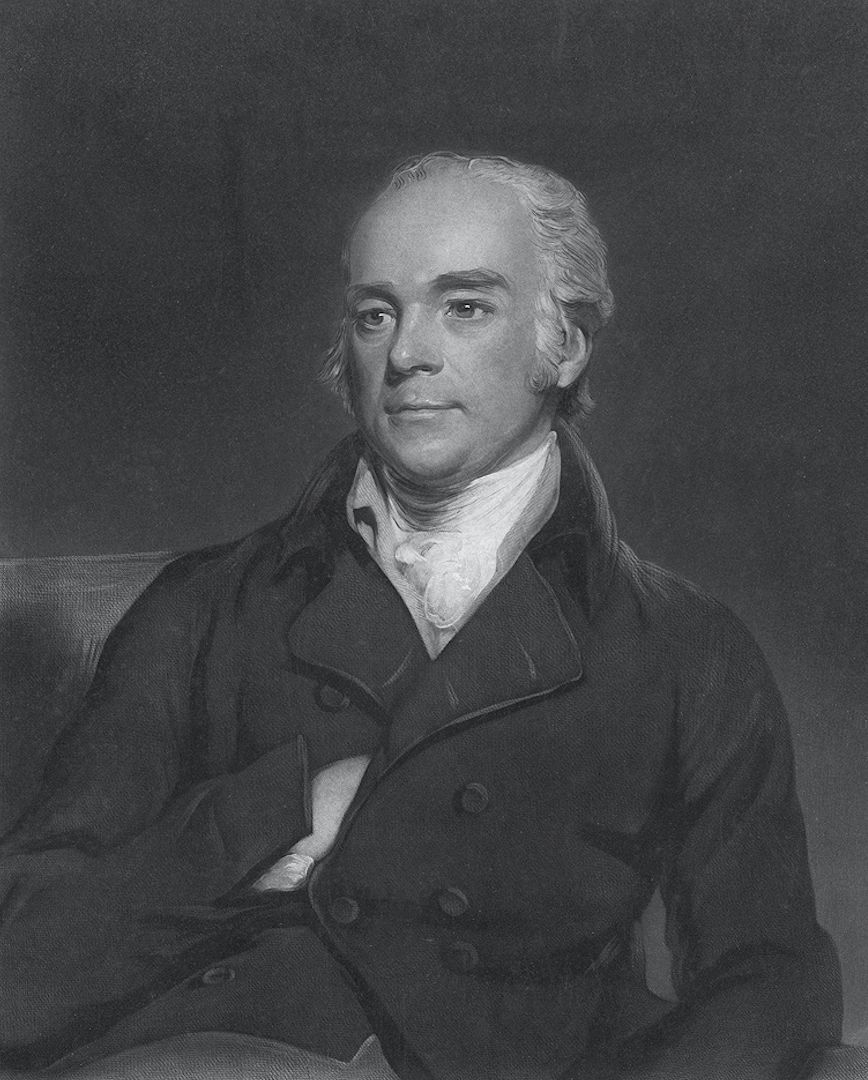
Thomas Babington of Rothley Temple (1758-1837), by Sir Thomas Lawrence

The Babingtons acquired Rothley Temple under Humphrey Babington (1491-1544), who married Eleanor Beaumont and had issue including Thomas Babington of Rothley Temple (1516-1567), who joined in the attempt to place Lady Jane Grey on the throne but ended up paying a fine to Mary I of England, and Francis Babington (d. 1569), who was Vice-Chancellor of Oxford University from 1560 to 1562. and chaplain to Robert Dudley, 1st Earl of Leicester.

Thomas Babington of Rothley Temple (1516-1567), aforementioned, married Eleanor Humfrey (1520-1578) and had issue. One of his sons, Zachary Babington (born 1549), served as Archdeacon of Nottingham and is the great-great-grandfather of Zachary Babington (d. 1745), who served as High Sheriff of Staffordshire between 1713-1724. Another son, Humphrey Babington of Rothley Temple (1544-1610), married Margaret Cave (d. 1629) and was the father of Thomas Babington of Rothley Temple (1627-1645) among others, whose son Matthew Babington (1612-1669) was MP for Leicestershire in 1660

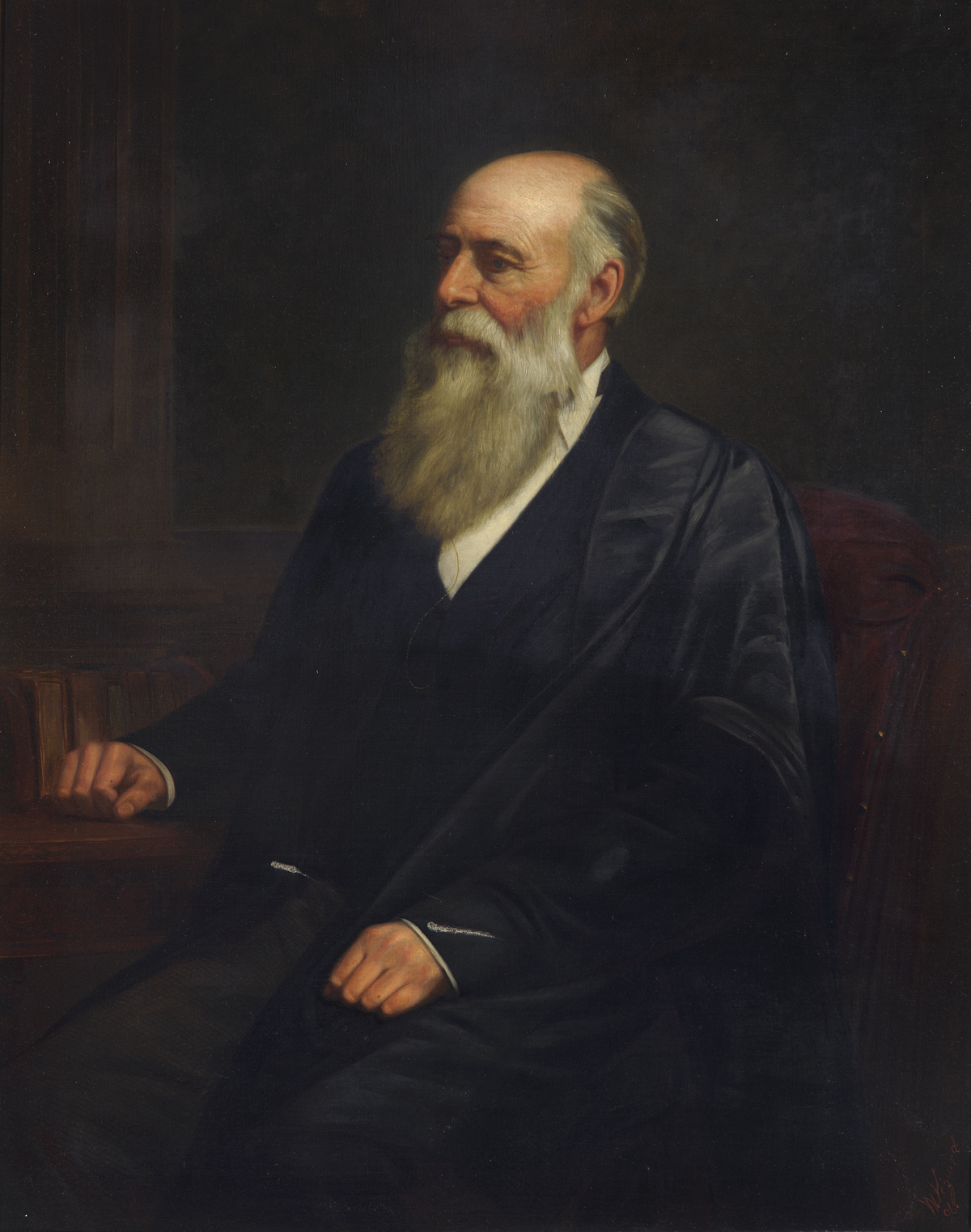
Cardale Babington by Worthy Vizard.

Matthew Babington of Rothley Temple (1612-1669) married Anne Hopkins and had four sons and eight daughters, including Thomas Babington of Rothley Temple (1635-1708), who was Member of Parliament for Leicester in 1685 and 1689. Thomas married Margaret Hall and had several children, notably Frances Babington, who married Sir Joseph Danvers, 1st Baronet, and Thomas Babington of Rothley Temple (1682-1745), who married Lydia Cardale on 9 January 1758. Thomas Babington and Lydia Cardale's children included Thomas Babington, a member of the Clapham Sect, who served as Member of Parliament for Leicester from 1800-1818 and was a noted campaigner against slavery, Rev. Matthew Babington (1761-1796) who was grandfather to Churchill Babington (the botanist whose publication Mr Macaulay's Character of the Clergy (1849), a defence of the clergy of the 17th Century, received the approval of Gladstone), Joseph Babington (1768-1826) who was father of Cardale Babington (the botanist and archaeologist who was a contemporary of Charles Darwin whilst at Cambridge in 1829) and Mary Babington (1760-1841) who married Thomas Gisborne.

Thomas Babington, Member of Parliament for Leicester from 1800 to 1818, married Jean Macaulay, sister of Zachary Macaulay and aunt of Thomas Babington Macaulay. Their eldest son, Thomas Gisborne Babington of Rothley Temple (1788-1871) was also a member of the Clapham Sect and had several children with his two wives, Augusta Julia Noel (daughter of Sir Gerard Noel, 2nd Baronet) and Augusta Felicita Françoise Thérèse Hubertin Vecqueray (daughter of Francis Gerard Vecqueray, one of the Secretaries of State to the King of Prussia for his Grand Duchy of the Rhine), and eventually sold Rothley Temple in 1845 to his brother-in-law Sir James Parker, who was married to his sister Mary Babington, whose son Harry Rainy Parker eventually sold Rothley in 1893.

Susan Emma Parker (1835-1913), daughter of Sir James Parker and Mary Babington, married Archibald Smith in 1853. One of their sons, Henry (later Sir Henry Babington Smith) changed his surname to Babington Smith and his descendants now use that surname. George Babington Parker, also a child of Sir James Parker and Mary Babington, served as MP for Gladstone in New Zealand from 1871-1875.

== Notable members ==
- Sir Anthony Babington (died 1536) (1476–1536), MP for Nottingham
- Anthony Babington (1561–1586), English nobleman responsible for the Babington Plot against Elizabeth I
- Bernard Babington Smith (1905-1993) was an academic, wartime intelligence officer and amateur athlete.
- Cardale Babington (1808–1895), English botanist and archaeologist
- Churchill Babington (1821–1889), English classical scholar and archaeologist
- Constance Babington Smith (1912–2000), journalist and writer
- Ellen Babington (1877–1956), British Olympic archer in 1908
- Francis Babington (died 1569), English divine and academic administrator
- Gervase Babington (1550–1610), Bishop of Exeter and Worcester
- Sir Henry Babington Smith (1863–1923), civil servant, whose father Archibald Smith married the daughter of Sir James Parker and Mary Babington
- Sir John Babington (died 1485) of Dethick, knight who died fighting for Richard III at the Battle of Bosworth
- John Babington (mathematician) (fl. 1635), mathematician and soldier
- Matthew Babington (1612–1669), MP for Leicestershire in 1660
- Michael Babington Smith (1901–1984), prominent banker; a director of the Bank of England
- Philip Babington (died 1690), Governor of Berwick-upon-Tweed from 1689-1690
- Thomas Babington (1758–1837), English philanthropist and politician
- William Babington (academic), Vice-Chancellor of Oxford University, 1441–1443
- Sir William Babington (justice) (c. 1370–1454), lawyer and judge
- Zachary Babington (died 1745), High Sheriff of Staffordshire
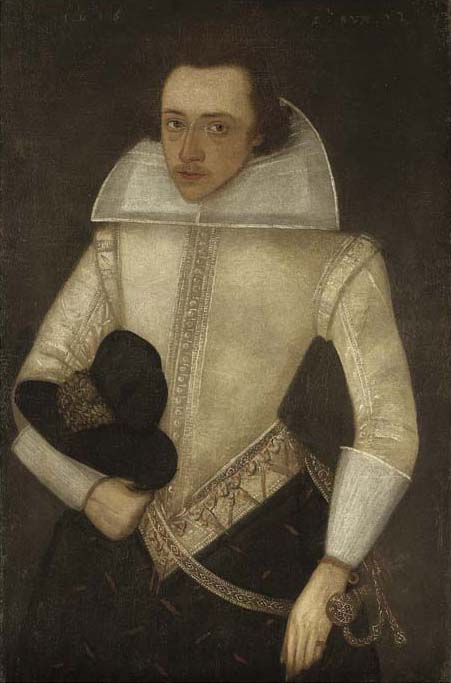
Anthony Babington

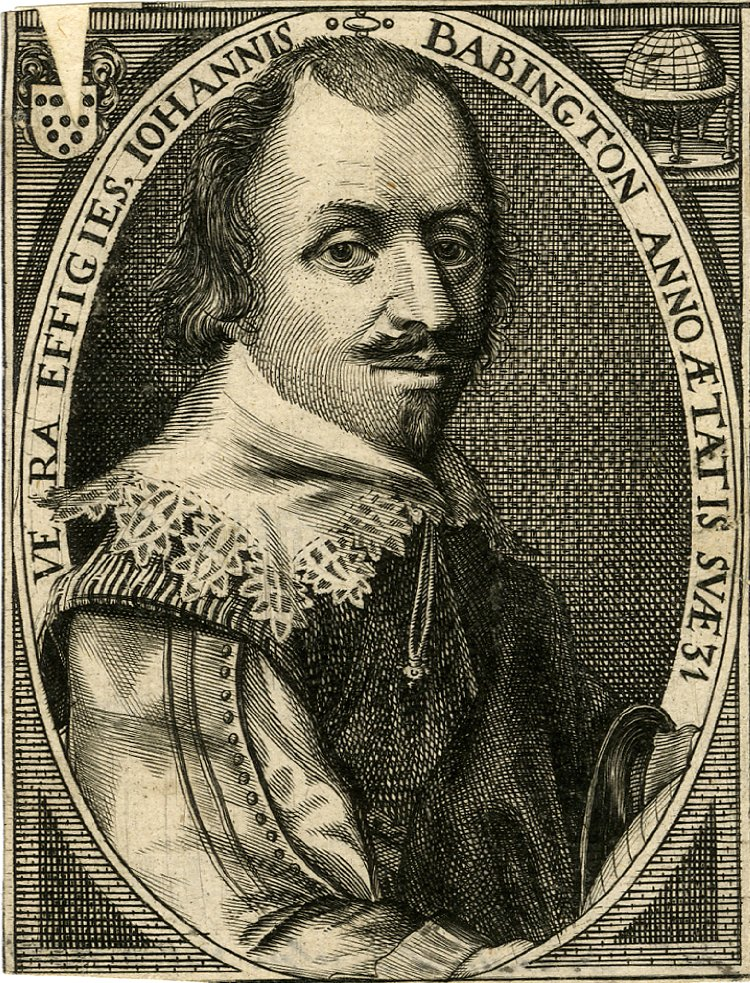
John Babington

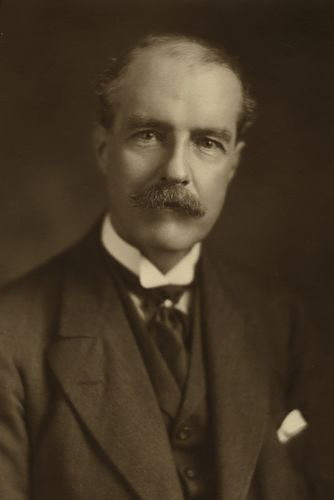
Sir Henry Babington Smith

== Babington family of Ireland ==
The Babington family of Ireland descend from the Babingtons of Dethick. Richard Babington (d. 1550), the son of Sir Anthony Babington, lived at Nantwich in Cheshire and was survived by his only son, also called Richard, who married Anne Starkey (1527-1564), daughter of Richard Starkey (1514-1566) and Jane Legh (1507-1589), in 1555. Richard and Anne's younger son, Brutus Babington, established the branch of the family in Ireland in 1610.

Urie Babington (1560-1605), a younger son of Richard Babington and Anne Starkey, had six children, including Anne Babington who married Sir Thomas Fanshawe and was mother of Thomas Fanshawe (Member of Parliament for Preston and Lancaster) and grandmother of Sir Thomas Fanshawe (Member of Parliament for Essex).

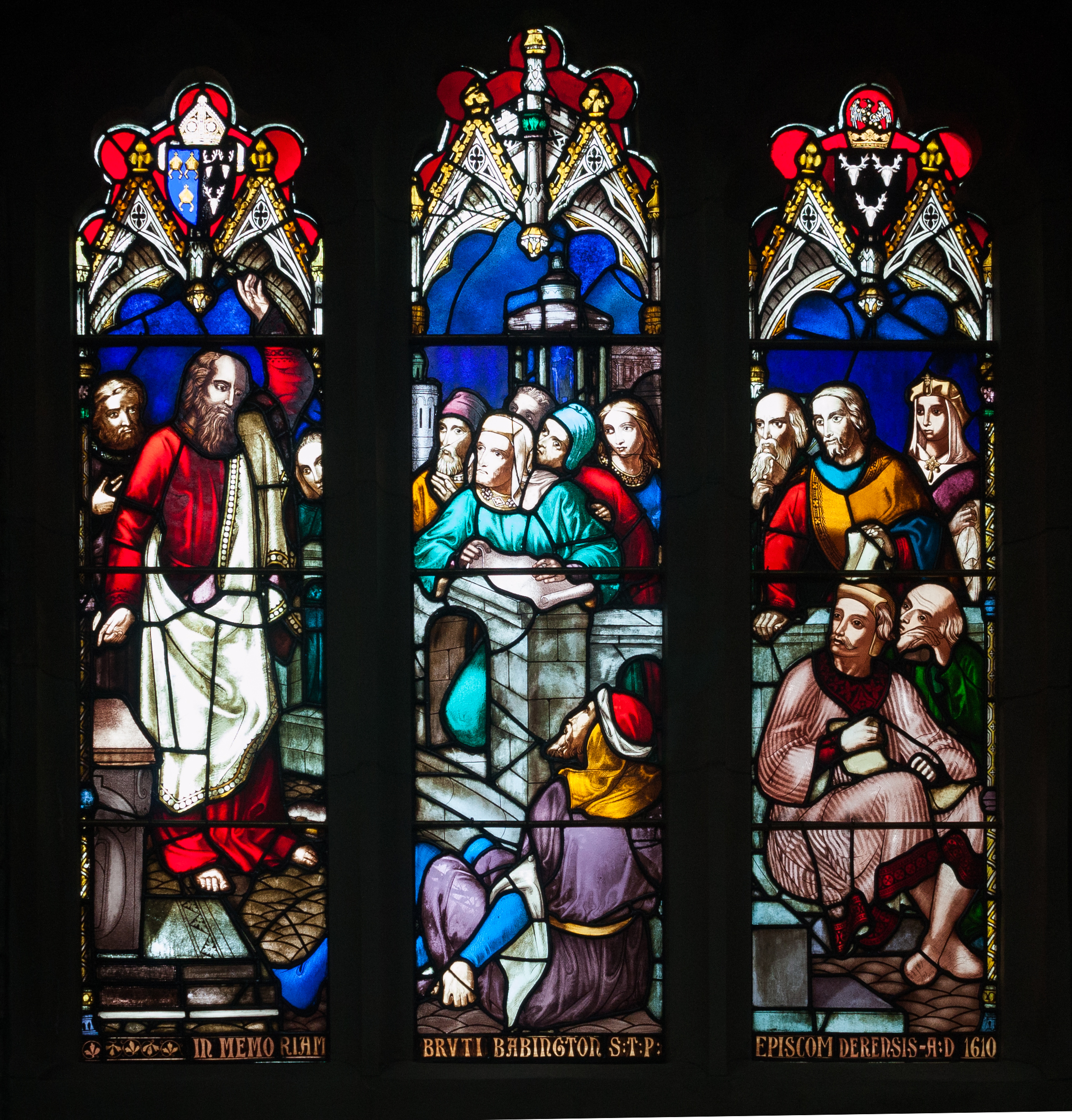
Brutus Babington memorial window in the north aisle of St Columb's Cathedral, installed c. 1860

The Babingtons first settled in Ireland in 1610 when Brutus Babington (1558-1611), the son of Richard Babington and Anne Starkey, was appointed Bishop of Derry by James I. Brutus Babington married Joan le Bird (1562-1611) of a Cheshire family with a branch in Virginia whose members included William Byrd II. Brutus had two sons. Brutus had given his eldest son Richard control of the Babington estate in Urney in 1610. Brutus's younger son Edwin (born 1585) was Sheriff of the city of Londonderry in 1608 and eventually succeeded his brother Richard in control of the Urney estate. Edwin Babington was taken prisoner during the Irish Rebellion of 1641 and gave evidence to the Commission of Enquiry. He married Francisca Cockes and had a son, Matthew Babington (1610-1689) of Urney and Doe Castle, who was attainted by the Dublin Parliament of King James II in 1689.

Matthew Babington married Elizabeth Galbraith, the daughter and heiress of Colonel James Galbraith, MP. Matthew had three sons: Captain William Babington of Urney (1651-1702), who was a Captain in the Derry Garrison during the Siege of Derry in 1689 and who appears in George Frederick Folingsby's painting 'The Relief of Derry', Thomas Babington (who owned land in Lifford) who married Isabella Stronge and Captain Richard Babington of Mullagh (1659-1749) who married Isabella Wray, daughter of William Wray (son of Henry Wray and Elizabeth Gore) and Angel Galbraith (a sister of Elizabeth who married Matthew Babington). Richard Babington was a Captain of Dragoons in the Irish Army of William III of England and he fought in the Battle of the Boyne.

=== Babingtons of Donegal ===
Captain William Babington of Urney (1651-1702) married Rebecca Wray, a sister of Isabella above and daughter of William Wray and Angel Galbraith, and had five children. Captain William Babington also lived at Doe Castle. William's second son also called William lived from 1694-1735 at Urney, Doe Castle. He was High Sheriff of Donegal in 1722 and High Sheriff of Tyrone in 1725. William (1694-1735) left the Urney estate to his wife, Catherine Johnston, who passed her effects to her second husband Colonel John Piggot. Captain Babington's third son, Ralph (died 1764) was High Sheriff of Donegal in 1715 and lived at Greenfort House in County Donegal. Richard's first son, Humphrey Babington (1742-1767) took over Greenfort when Ralph died and had two children: Ralph (died 1806) of Greenfort House and Catherine who married Robert Hay in 1791 (they were the parents of 14 children including William Hay). Ralph (died 1806) married a Rebecca Scanlan (the daughter of James Scanlan and Anne Babington) and had a daughter: Catherine (died 1865) who married Major Baptist Barton in 1815 and had three children. Greenfort House passed to the Barton family through the female line.

Captain Babington's fourth son was Richard Babington (1699-1748) who lived at Marble Hill House in Dunfanaghy. Richard married Anne Stewart of Horn Head House, Co Donegal, and had one son and two daughters. Richard Babington's only son, William (1730-1789) also lived at Marble Hill House. The Babingtons left Marble Hill shortly after William's death in 1789 and it changed hands between several families.

=== Babingtons of Derry ===
Captain Richard Babington of Mullagh, who lived at Mullagh/Daisy Hill (later Roe Park House) in Limavady and at Lifford, where he had inherited his brother Thomas's land, had ten children by Isabella Wray. Captain Babington's eldest son, Rev. William Babington (1713-1777), was a clergyman in Donegal and had seven children - their eldest son was Rev. William Babington (1746-1818) who married Janet Maitland and was the father of Rev. Charles Maitland Babington (1775-1841) and John Babington (1785-1848). One of Rev. Charles Maitland Babington's sons was Lieutenant-General David Staig Babington (1804-1874), who was the grandfather of Dorothy Grace Babington (born 1887) who married Frithjof Pihl (a descendant of Abraham Pihl and great-nephew of Carl Abraham Pihl) and lived at Engø Gård, which they turned into a hotel on the island of Tjøme. Rev. William Babington's younger son John (1785-1848) was employed by the East India Company and had several wives by whom he had many children, including Lieutenant-General John Henry Melville Babington (1816-1887) of the Indian Staff Corps and Major-General Richard Clarke Babington (1827-1885) of the Indian Staff Corps.

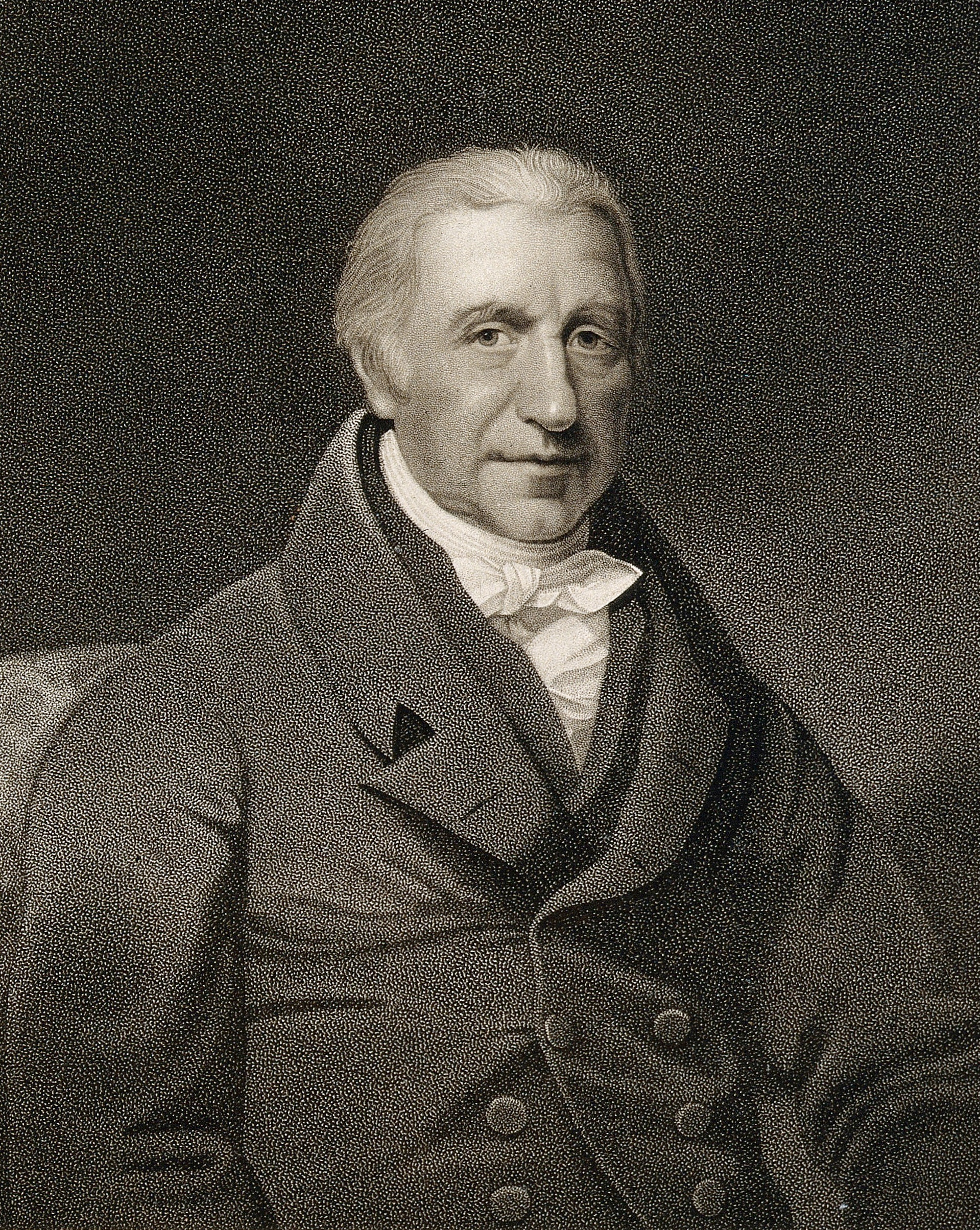
William Babington by William Thomas Fry.

Captain Babington's second son, Rev. Humphrey Babington (1715-1790) was the father of seven children. Rev. Humphrey Babington's third son was William Babington (1756-1833) who was a physician and mineralogist whose contributions made him a founder member of the Geological Society of London, where he was president from 1822-1824. William Babington was the father of eleven children including Martha Lyndon Babington, who married the physician Richard Bright, and Benjamin Guy Babington, a physician and epidemiologist who was elected the founding President of the Epidemiological Society of London in 1850. Benjamin Guy Babington's grandchildren included Anna Maria Babington, founder of Babington's tea room in 1893, and Colville Burroughs Babington who emigrated to Argentina in 1889 and who is an ancestor of Carlos Babington.

William Babington (1756-1833)'s eldest son was William Babington (1789-1828) who was the father of Lieutenant-Colonel William Babington (1826-1913) who lived at Brooklands House in Sarisbury Green. Colonel Babington (1826-1913) had nine children, including Lieutenant-General Sir James Melville Babington, who commanded the 1st Cavalry Brigade as a Major-General during the Second Boer War and commanded the 23rd Division during the First World War. General Babington's image was used by The Beatles as the fictional "Sgt. Pepper" for the album "Sgt. Pepper's Lonely Heart's Club Band" in 1967. Another son of Colonel Babington was Charles Hagart Babington (1859-1951) who was President of the Institute of Brewing and Distilling in 1904. Charles Hagart Babington was the father of Air Marshal Sir John Tremayne Babington and Air Marshal Sir Philip Babington, who were both on the Air Council during the Second World War.

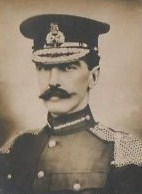
Lieutenant-General Sir James Melville Babington during the Second Boer War.

Rev. Richard Babington (1720-1800), Captain Babington's third son, was the father of David Babington who built Foyle Park House - later Grocers' Hall - in Eglinton and who served as the Member of Parliament for Ballyshannon.

George Babington, Captain Babington's fourth son, was a merchant in Derry and married Mary Stafford by whom he had eight children. George Babington's eldest son was Rev. Richard Babington (1765-1813). Creevagh House, the seat of the Babington family in Derry, was built in 1780 by the Babingtons, so it is probable that it was built by George. Richard Babington married Mary Boyle and had fourteen children. Richard's fifth son Anthony Babington (1800-1869) was High Sheriff of County Londonderry in 1833 and 1835 and lived at Creevagh House where he owned 1,540 acres. Richard's eleventh son, Thomas Henderson Babington (1813-1869) was a surgeon who became Mayor of Derry. Richard's seventh son, Rev. Hume Babington (1804-1886) married Esther Nettles (1808-1878) of Nettleville House, County Cork and had 13 children.

Rev. Hume Babington (1804-1886)'s eldest son was Rev. Richard Babington, whose son Rev. Richard Babington was Dean of Cork from 1914 to 1951. Richard's son, Ven. Richard Babington, who lived from 1901-1984, was Archdeacon of Exeter from 1958-1970 and Treasurer of Exeter Cathedral from 1962-1970.

Hume Babington (1848-1925), a fourth son of Rev Hume Babington, inherited Creevagh House from Anthony Babington (1800-1869). Hume Babington had three children through his marriage to Hester Watt (sister of Andrew Alexander Watt): Sir Anthony Babington (1877-1972), Member of Parliament for two Belfast constituencies from 1925-1937 and Attorney General for Northern Ireland,; Hume Babington, CBE (1880-1963) and Aileen Frances Babington (1879-1922) who married Thomas Fitzpatrick Cooke of Caw House.

Rev Hume Babington's fifth son was David Robert Babington (1852-1902) who had six children with Mary Le Fanu. David Robert Babington (1852-1902), through his son Major David Babington (1887-1963), was the grandfather of Robert Babington, Member of Parliament for North Down in the Northern Ireland Parliament from 1969-1972 and a recipient of the Distinguished Service Cross

Another descendant of the Irish Babingtons was Anthony Babington, who lived from 1920-2004. He was injured in the Battle of Arnhem and left for dead until slight movements were detected. Babington served in the Dorset Regiment during the Second World War. He was a recipient of the Croix de Guerre. Babington wrote books about the British Army during the Second World War and his ability to overcome his war injuries are documented in his autobiography An Uncertain Voyage.

=== Babington's tea room ===
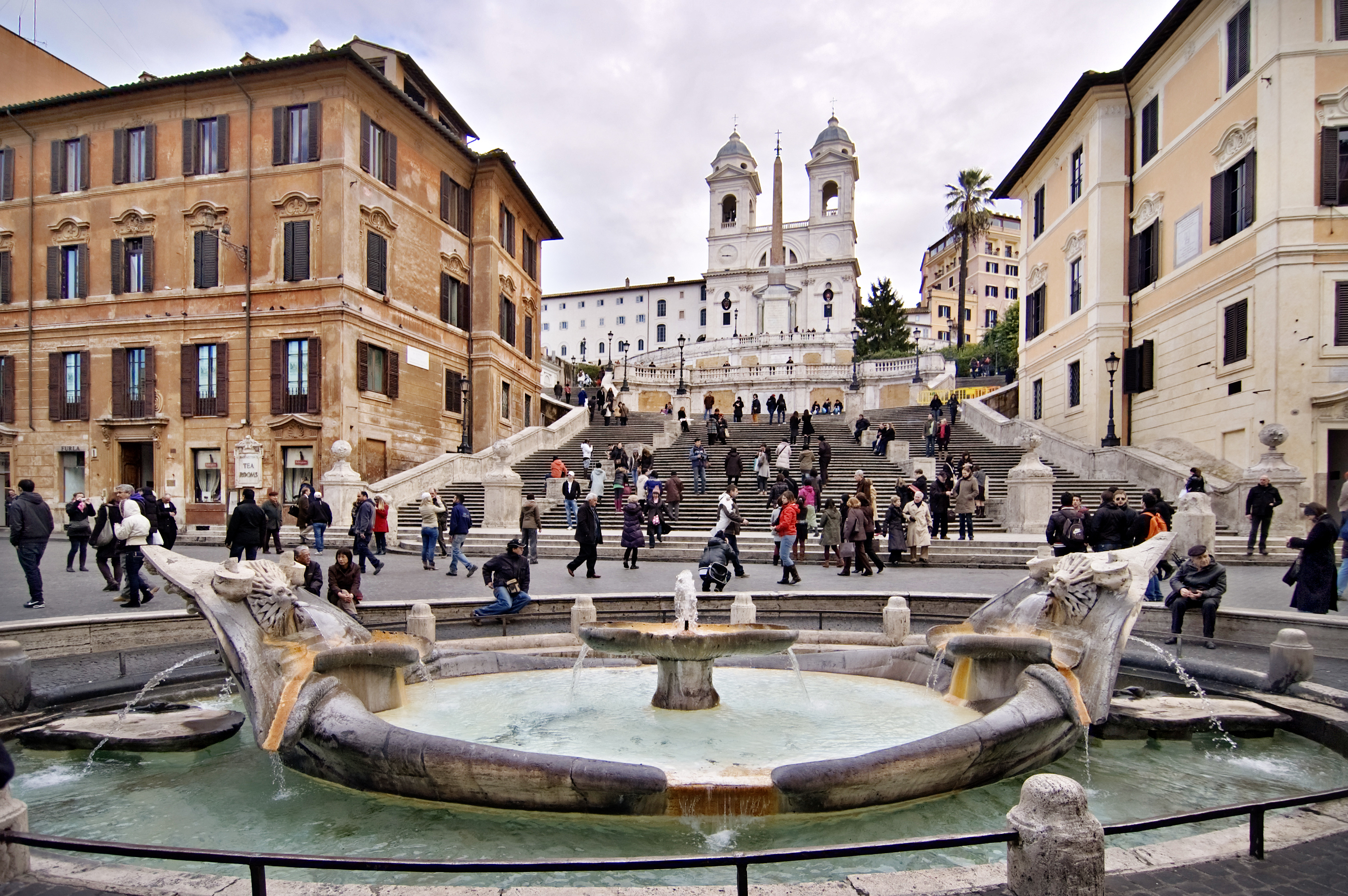
Babington's tea room, on the left of the Spanish Steps

Babington's tea room was founded in 1893 by Isabel Cargill and Anne Marie Babington to establish a traditional English tearoom for the English expats living in Rome. Babington's survived two world wars, the advent of fast food and various economic crises, and has become a favourite meeting place for writers, actors, artists and politicians.

=== Babingtonite ===
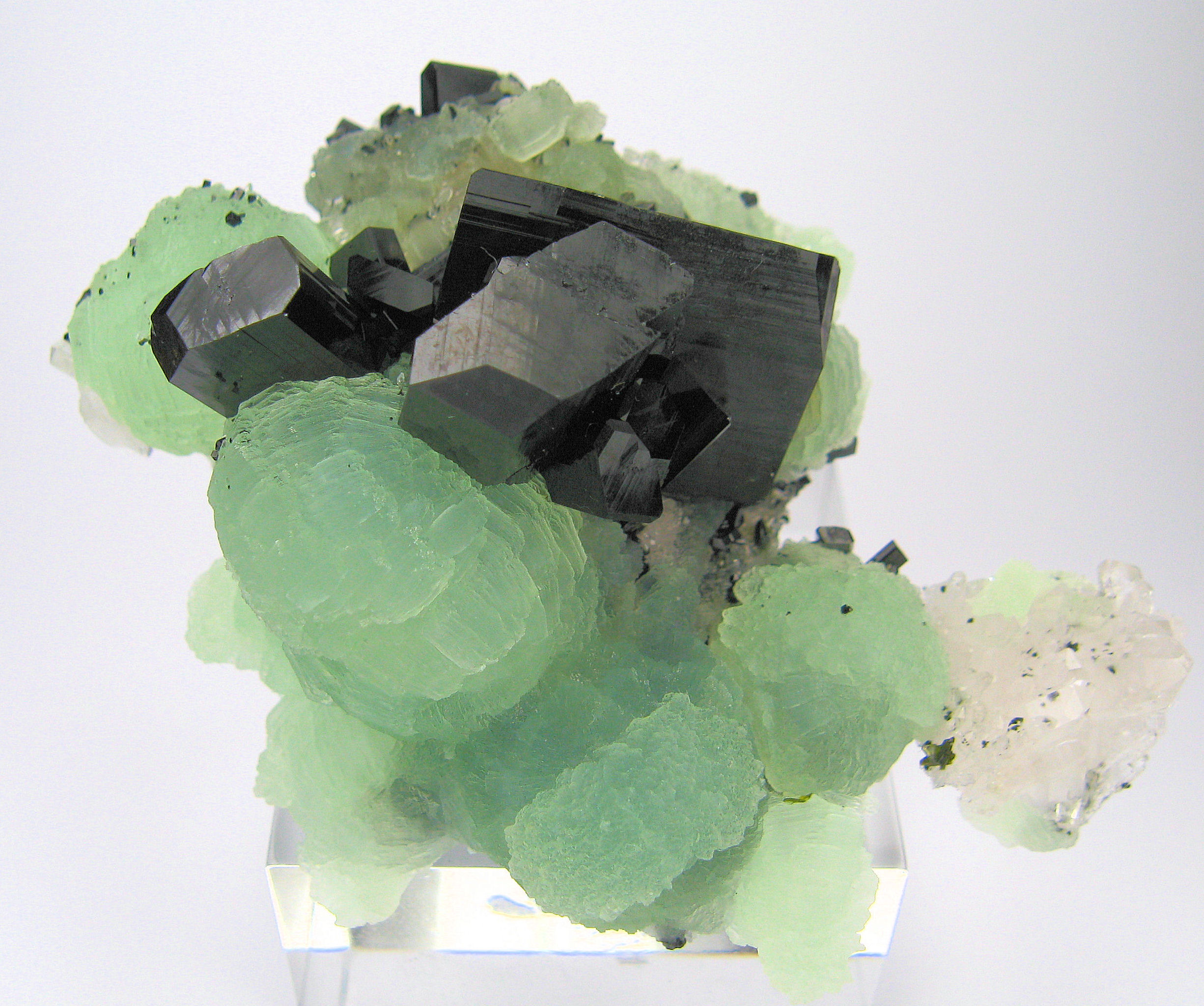
Triclinic crystals of babingtonite with prehnite, from Qiaojia, China

Babingtonite was named after William Babington (1757–1833). It is the official mineral (mineral emblem) of the Commonwealth of Massachusetts.

=== Notable members ===
- Anthony Babington (judge), Croix de Guerre recipient, author, judge, historian, campaigner
- Sir Anthony Babington (politician) (1877–1972), Northern Ireland politician, barrister and judge
- Anthony Babington Wilson, former business executive and artist
- Benjamin Guy Babington (1794–1866), English physician and epidemiologist
- Brutus Babington (1558–1611), Bishop of Derry
- Carlos Babington, Argentine defender at the 1974 World Cup.
- Rev. Hume Babington, Rector at Moviddy, Cork
- Sir James Melville Babington (1854–1936), Boer War commander
- Sir John Tremayne Babington (1891–1979), British Air Marshal
- Sir Philip Babington (1894–1965), British Air Marshal
- Ven. Richard Babington (Dean of Cork), Dean of Cork from 1914 to 1951
- Very Rev. Richard Babington (Archdeacon of Exeter), Archdeacon of Exeter from 1958 to 1970
- Robert Babington (1920–2010), Northern Ireland politician, barrister and judge
- William Babington (physician) (1756–1833), physician and mineralogist
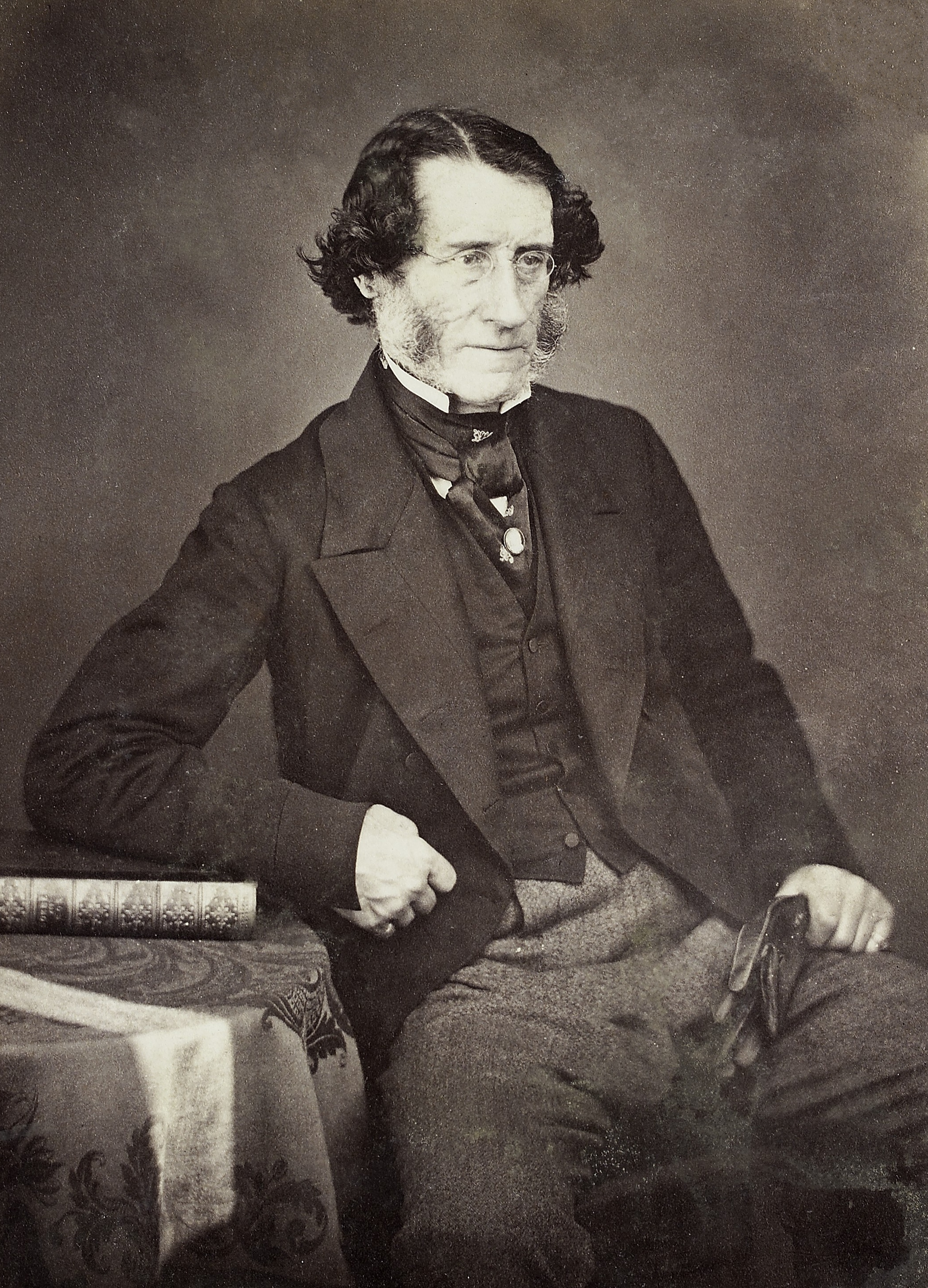
Benjamin Guy Babington

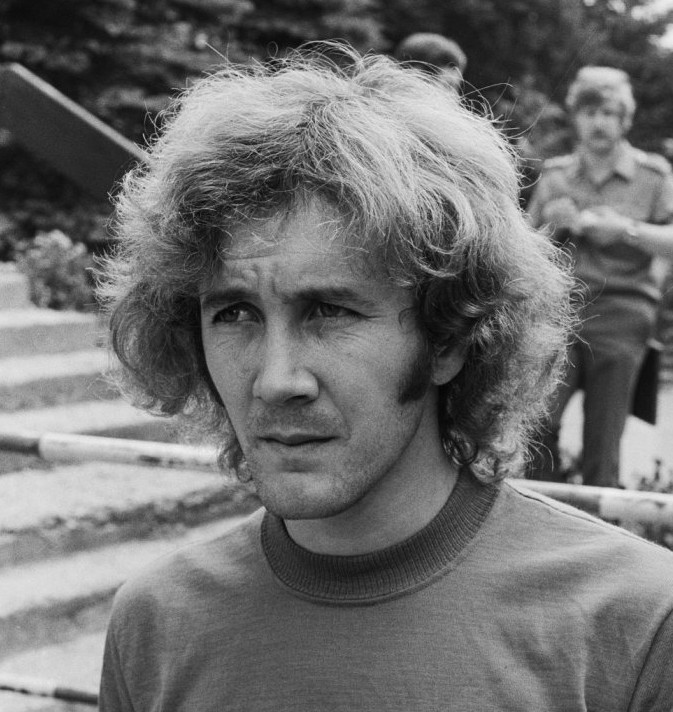
Carlos Babington

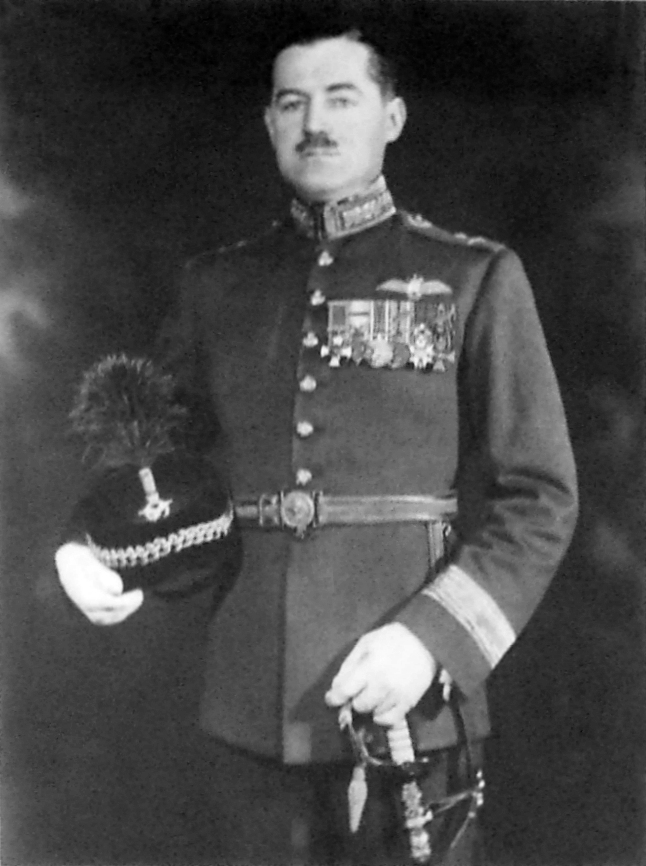
Air Marshal Sir John Tremayne Babington

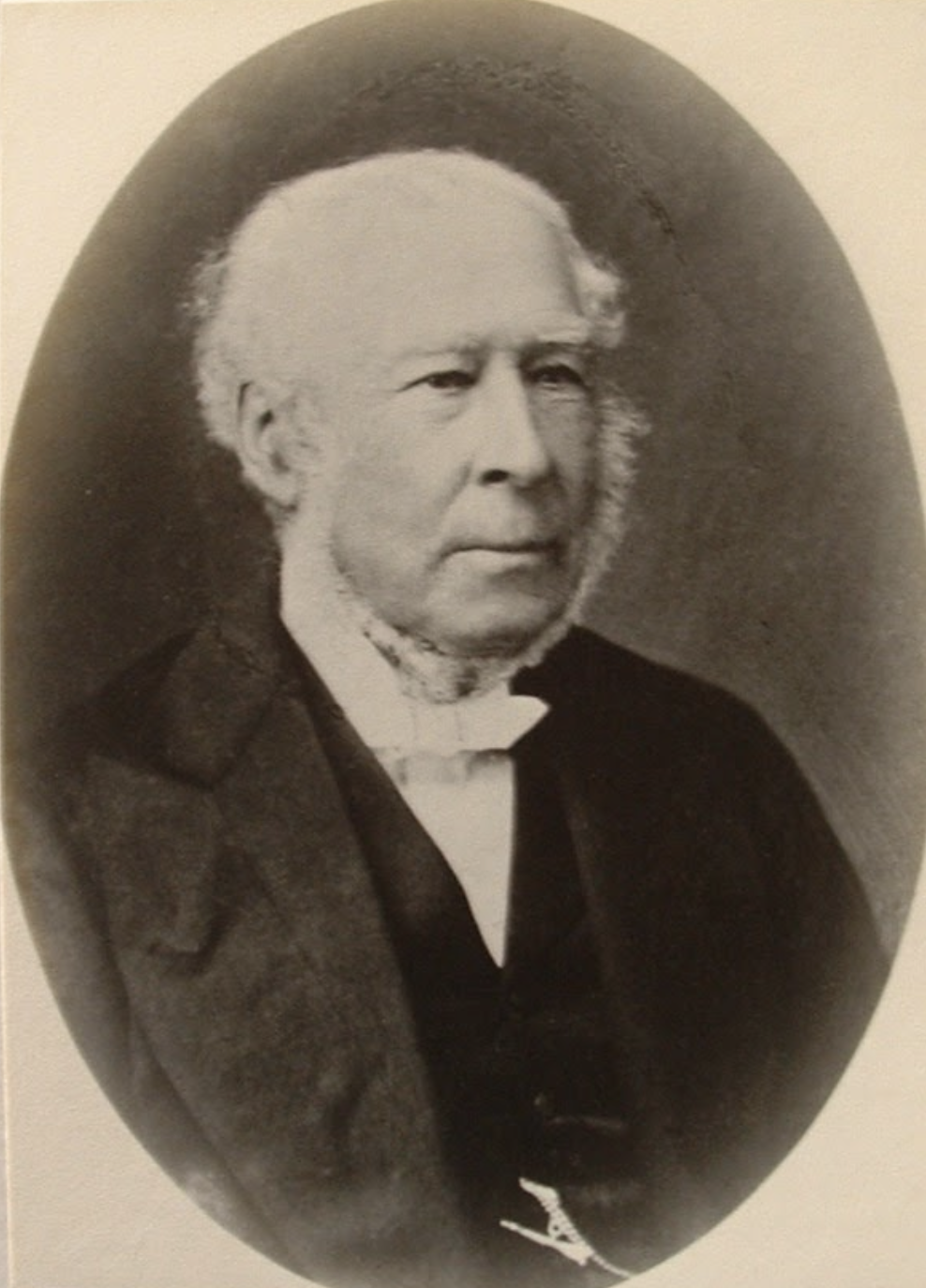
Rev. Hume Babington

=== Other descendants ===
- Sir Charles Patton Keyes (1822-1896), British General, grandson of Margaret Babington (1767-1845) [daughter of Rev. William Babington (1713-1777)]
- Sir Terence Keyes (1877-1939), British General, great-grandson of Margaret Babington (1767-1845) [daughter of Rev. William Babington (1713-1777)]
- Roger Keyes, 1st Baron Keyes (1872-1945), British Admiral of the Fleet, great-grandson of Margaret Babington (1767-1845) [daughter of Rev. William Babington (1713-1777)]
- Sir Robert Charles Gunning, 8th Baronet (1901-1989), British Baronet, great-grandson of Jessie Miller Babington (1804-1881) [daughter of Rev Charles Maitland Babington (1775-1841]
- Sir Charles Theodore Gunning, 9th Baronet (born 1935), British Baronet, great-great-grandson of Jessie Miller Babington (1804-1881) [daughter of Rev Charles Maitland Babington (1775-1841]
- Sir Richard Howard-Vyse (1883-1962), British General, great-grandson of Jessie Miller Babington (1804-1881) [daughter of Rev Charles Maitland Babington (1775-1841]
- Sir Charles Phibbs Jones (1906-1988), British General, grandson of Angel Babington [daughter of Rev. Hume Babington (1804-1878)]
- Sir Edward Jones (1936-2007), British General who served as Black Rod, great-grandson of Angel Babington [daughter of Rev. Hume Babington (1804-1878)]
- Douglas Craven Phillott (1869-1930), British army officer and scholar, great-grandson of Lilias Staig Babington (1794-1843) [daughter of Rev Charles Maitland Babington (1775-1841]
- Sir Basil Phillott Blackett (1882-1935), British civil servant and financier, great-great-grandson of Lilias Staig Babington (1794-1843) [daughter of Rev Charles Maitland Babington (1775-1841)]

== See also ==
- Thomas Babington Macaulay, 1st Baron Macaulay
- William Babington Maxwell
- R. B. Babington (1869-1935), American businessman, telecommunications pioneer, banker, and alderman of Gastonia, North Carolina
