= Babington =

Babington may refer to:

- Babington family
- Babington (surname)
- Babington, Somerset, England, a small village between Radstock and Frome
- Babington House, an example of Georgian architecture in Somerset, England
- Babington Academy, a school in Leicester, England
- Babington's tea room, a traditional English tearoom in Rome
- Babingtonite, mineral named after William Babington
- Babington Path, a road in Hong Kong

== See also ==
- Babington Plot, a 16th-century conspiracy in England
- Babbington
