= Anthony Babington (disambiguation) =

Sir Anthony Babington (1561–1586) was an English plotter.

Anthony Babington may also refer to:

- Sir Anthony Babington (Nottingham MP) (1476–1536), MP for Nottingham
- Sir Anthony Babington (judge, born 1877) (1877–1972), Irish barrister, judge and politician
- Anthony Babington (author) (1920–2004), British Croix de Guerre recipient, author, judge, historian, and campaigner

== See also ==
- Anthony Babington Wilson (born 1931) Anglo-Irish former business executive, artist and author
