= John Babington =

John Babington may refer to:

- Sir John Babington (died 1485), knight killed at the Battle of Bosworth
- John Babington (mathematician) (fl. 1635), English mathematician and gunner
- Sir John Tremayne Babington (1891–1979), British Royal Air Force officer
- John Babington (Royal Navy officer) (1911–1992), British Royal Navy officer awarded the George Cross in World War II
