= Babington (surname) =

Babington is an English surname. Notable people with the surname include:

- Anthony Babington (1561–1586), English nobleman responsible for the Babington Plot against Elizabeth I
- Anthony Babington (died 1972) (1877–1972), Northern Ireland politician, barrister and judge
- Benjamin Guy Babington (1794–1866), English physician and epidemiologist
- Cardale Babington (1808–1895), English botanist and archaeologist
- Carlos Babington (1949–2026), Argentine footballer, manager and club president
- Charlie Babington (1895–1957), American baseball player
- Churchill Babington (1821–1889), English classical scholar and archaeologist
- Ellen Babington (1877–1956), British Olympic archer in 1908
- Francis Babington (died 1569), English divine and academic administrator
- Gervase Babington (1550–1610), Bishop of Exeter and Worcester
- Sir James Melville Babington (1854–1936), Boer War commander
- John Tremayne Babington (1891–1979), British Air Marshal
- Kevin Babington (born 1968), Irish equestrian
- Thomas Babington (1758–1837), English philanthropist and politician
- William Babington (disambiguation)

== See also ==
- Babington family
- Constance Babington Smith (1912–2000), British journalist and writer
- Sir Henry Babington Smith (1863–1923), British civil servant
- Thomas Babington Macaulay, 1st Baron Macaulay
- William Babington Maxwell
- Babbington (surname)
