= Richard Babington =

Richard Babington may refer to:

- Richard Babington (Dean of Cork) (1869–1952), Dean of Cork, 1914–1951
- Richard Babington (Archdeacon of Exeter) (1901–1984), Archdeacon of Exeter, 1958–1970
