= Hume Babington =

Church of Ireland clergyman (1804–1886)

The Reverend Hume Babington
- Rector of Moviddy
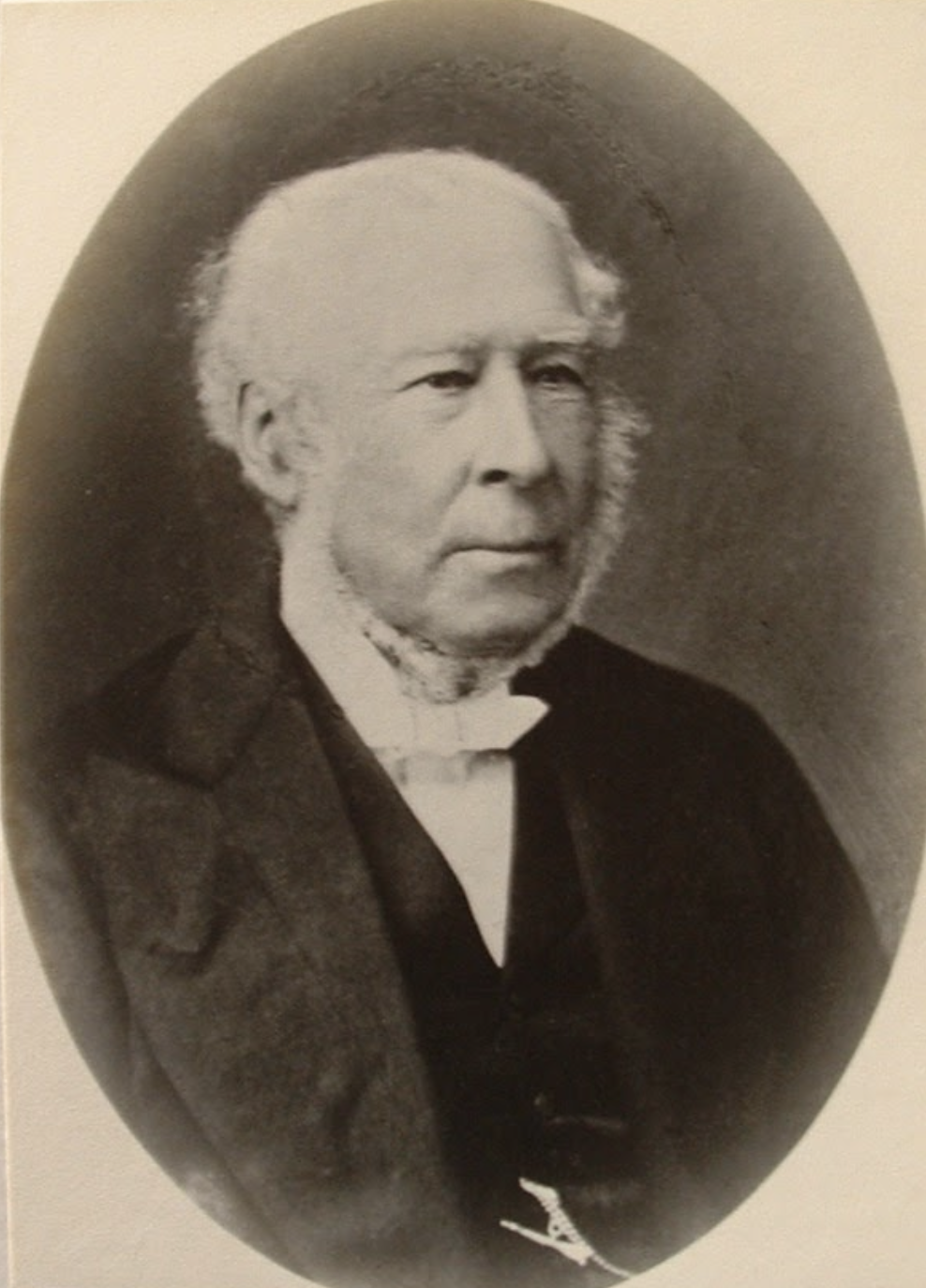
- Diocese: Cork, Cloyne and Ross

Personal details
- Born: 1 September 1804
- Died: 23 January 1886 (aged 81)
- Denomination: Church of Ireland
- Spouse: Esther Nettles (m. 1836; died 1878)
- Children: 13 (5 sons and 8 daughters)
- Profession: Priest
- Education: Trinity College, Dublin

Hume Babington (1 September 1804 – 23 January 1886) was a Church of Ireland clergyman, serving as the rector at Moviddy, County Cork, for 53 years from 1833 to 1886, and a proponent of secular education in Ireland.

== Early life ==
Hume Babington was born in 1804 to the Rev. Richard Babington and his wife Mary Boyle, both members of the Anglo-Irish landed gentry. His father, the rector of Lower Comber (Diocese of Derry), led an extravagant lifestyle and is said to have left debts of £40,000 on his death in 1831, aged 66, equivalent to some £4.1 million as of 2019. His father's debt was paid off by his two brothers Richard (1795–1870) and Anthony of Creevagh (1800–1869) between them. Another brother was Major-General William Babington.

He was educated at Trinity College, Dublin.

== Life as a clergyman ==
He began his career as a curate of Lower Cumber, where his father was rector, in 1827. He became rector of Moviddy in 1833, aged 29. As rector, Hume carried out improvements worth £166,766 as of 2019. As a clergyman he was part of a wave towards secular education in Ireland in the 1800s. In this capacity he is remembered as a 'very forward thinking individual'. Hume was one of the signatories of a progressive booklet titled 'Declaration in Favour of United Secular Education in Ireland' in 1866. The declaration noted, on behalf of the united Church of England and Ireland, 'We entirely admit the justice and policy of the rule which protects scholars from interference with their religious principles and thus enables members of different denominations, to receive together in harmony and peace, the benefits of a good education'.

He was also, notably, in 1843, an addressee of the 'Crookstown letter', a famous incident at the time covered by the Cork Examiner and Cork Commercial Courier. He published, in the Cork Constitution, the contents of a threatening letter he had received ('the Crookstown notice'), in which it threatened, among others, Hume Babington, with murder if he did not become a repealer of the Act of Union 1801 and with making a bonfire of hay in his farmyard if he did not show the letter to its other addresses. The letter was alleged to have been written by a Roman Catholic resident of Crookstown. The Roman Catholic parish priest, Fr Daly, and parishioners refuted the allegation that the letter had been authored by a Roman Catholic and claimed that, conversely, the letter was an invention of a local Protestant who wrote 'repeal or die' on the Crookstown Bridge. A local magistrate, JB Warren, to whom the letter had also been addressed, pledged to carry out an investigation but Hume Babington did not hand over the original letter, causing the local Roman Catholic population to regard Babington's publication of the letter in the press as 'prejudiced, premature and defamatory of the character of the people whose industry he derives his income'. Babington stated that he had always been on friendly terms with the Roman Catholic parish priest and his Roman Catholic parishioners and had no intention of offending them but was in fact pushed to publish it by local magistrates. He continued as rector of Moviddy for another 43 years following this incident.

He was also involved with the Society for Promoting the Education of the Poor of Ireland.

== Personal life ==
He married, in 1836, Esther, daughter of Richard Nettles, Esq., JP, of Nettleville, County Cork, with whom he had 5 sons and 8 daughters:

- Rev. Richard Babington (1837-29 September 1893), rector at Glendermot, County Londonderry, Ireland (father of Richard Babington (Dean of Cork))
- Anne Babington (27 August 1838 – 1873); she married Rev. George Herrick
- Caroline Mary Babington (4 December 1839 – 1840); unmarried
- Captain James Boyle Babington, RN (26 April 1841 – 19 July 1897), he married Elizabeth Blackley and emigrated to Vancouver, Canada around 1888 (father of Captain Hume Blackley Babington and Evoryna May Babington of Vancouver)
- Mary Babington (12 February 1842 – 1914); unmarried
- Esther Elizabeth Babington (29 April 1843 – 31 August 1878); she married her cousin Richard Nettles, Esq., JP, of Nettleville, County Cork
- Caroline Sarah Anne Babington (8 March 1844 – 6 December 1935); unmarried
- Angel Babington (14 June 1845-d.); she married Rev. Richard Bathoe Jones (grandmother of General Sir Charles Jones and Sir Edward Warburton Jones among others)
- Georgina Kingsley Babington (13 July 1846 – 5 April 1938); unmarried
- Robert Babington (6 July 1847-d.)
- Hume Babington, Esq., JP, of Creevagh, County Londonderry, Ireland (15 July 1848 - 6 June 1925); inherited the Creevagh estate, from his uncle Anthony, aged 21 in 1869 (father of Sir Anthony Babington)
- Helen Frances Babington (17 August 1850 – 28 December 1934); unmarried
- David Robert Babington (17 August 1852 – 17 May 1902), solicitor, married Mary Le Fanu on 12 November 1878 (grandfather of Robert Babington)

He died 23 January 1886 at Moviddy Rectory, County Cork, aged 81. He is buried with his wife, Esther, who died on 29 August 1878, aged 70.
