= Brutus Babington =

English bishop

The Rt Rev. Brutus (or Brute) Babington (1558–1611) was an Englishman who became the Church of Ireland Bishop of Derry.

== Life ==
He was the son of Richard Babington and Anne Starkey (formerly of Wrenbury Hall). He was the great-grandson of Sir Anthony Babington, MP for Nottingham and the second cousin to the conspirator Anthony Babington. He was a native of Cheshire, and was admitted to Christ's College, Cambridge, where he matriculated in 1572. He graduated B.A. in 1576, and became a fellow also in 1576, with an M.A. from St John's College, Cambridge in 1579.

He was rector of Thurcaston, Leicestershire, from 1583. He was collated to the prebend of Bishopshall, in Lichfield Cathedral, 18 September 1592, and was rector of Tatenhill, Staffordshire, from 1602. On the death of George Boleyn, Babington applied for the deanery of Lichfield unsuccessfully. On 6 July 1603, he complained to The 7th Earl of Shrewsbury that the chancellor of the diocese, Zachary Babington, had obstructed his suit and dispossessed him of his divinity lectureship.

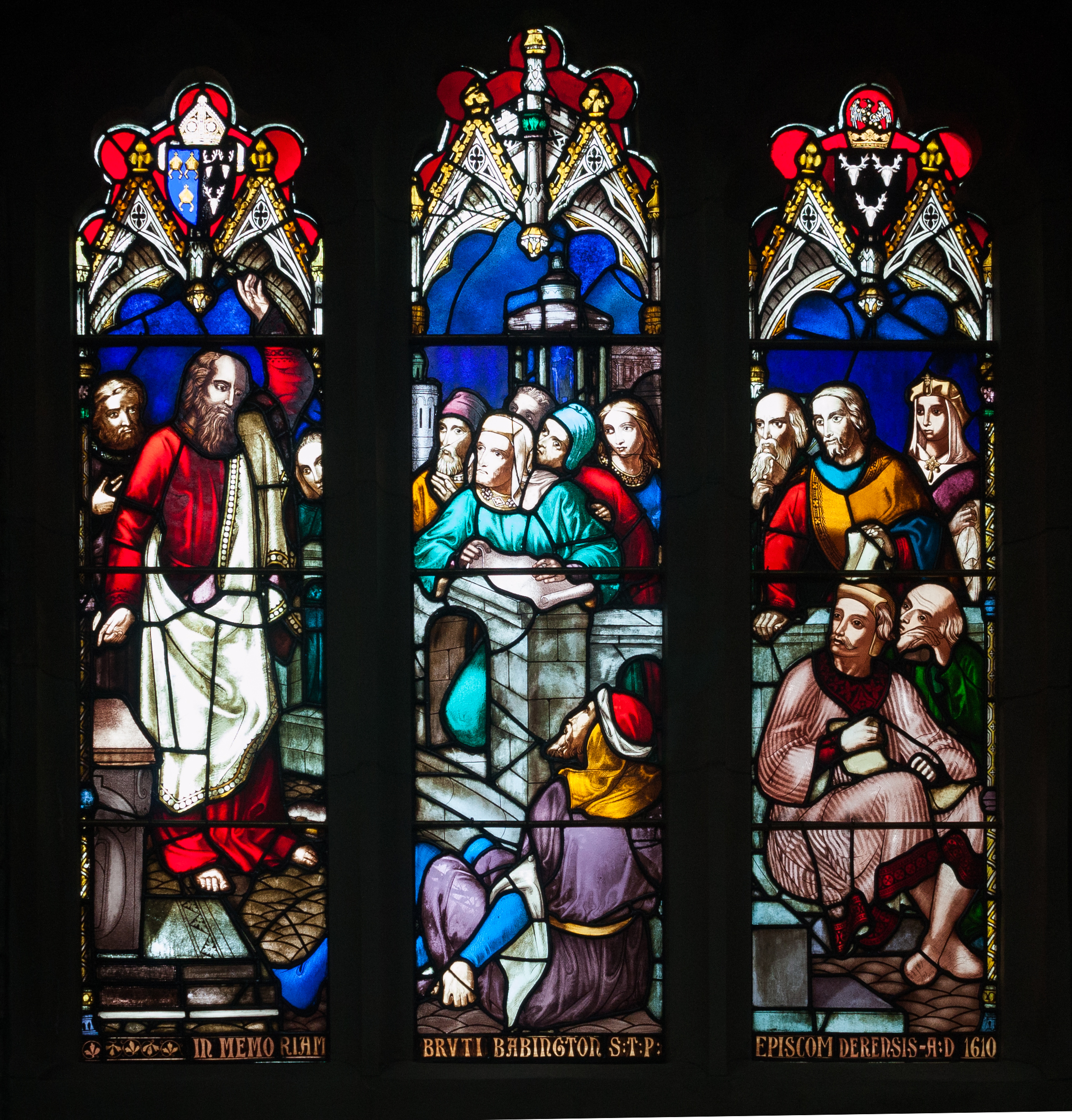
Bishop Babington memorial window in the north aisle of St Columb's Cathedral, installed c. 1860

In 1610 he was appointed to the bishopric of Derry, after some opposition from supporters of Dean William Webb. Babington was chosen as an advocate of a persuasive missionary approach to convert the native population to the reformed faith, an approach which was preferred by King James and his Privy Council. His predecessor, George Montgomery, was considered disappointing in his dedication to missionary and pastoral work and translated to Meath in 1609. Babington tried a new approach with his clergy. In his own words, he "did not violently go to work with them nor urge them by authority, but endeavoured rather to persuade their consciences by arguments and reasons." He tried also to compromise by being content with an Oath of Allegiance instead of insisting on an Oath of Supremacy, and approving an Irish language translation of the liturgy. Babington successfully convinced one of the diocesan chapters to agree.

Bishop Babington died unexpectedly early on 10 September 1611. Among Catholics his death was ascribed to a divine punishment as he suggested to Andrew Knox, Bishop of Raphoe, to destroy the wooden statue of the Virgin at Agivey. The statue was attributed to miraculous cures which drew pilgrims even from the Pale. Bishop Knox himself took the statue from Agivey and brought it to Coleraine, where it was destroyed by fire in the town centre.
