= Dethick Manor =

Farmhouse in Dethick, Derbyshire, England

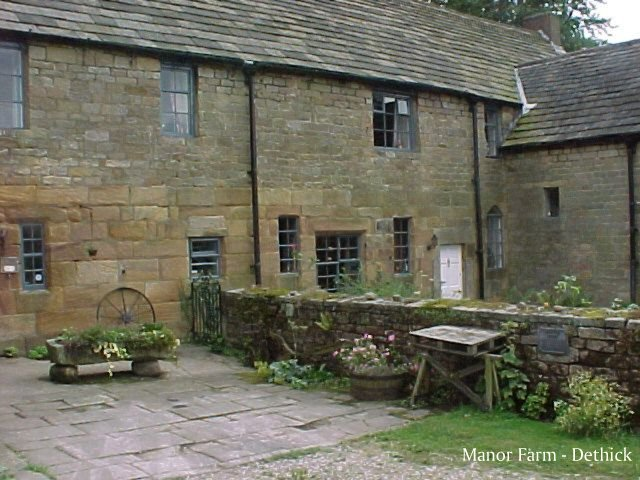
- The Manor is part of a farm today

- Location within Derbyshire

General information
- Location: near Matlock in Derbyshire, England
- Coordinates: 53.1181°N 1.51226°W
- Ordnance Survey: SK32765798
- Year built: 16th century
- Client: Dethick family

Dethick Manor is a 16th-century manor house, situated at Dethick, Amber Valley, Derbyshire, much altered in the 18th century and converted to use as a farmhouse. It is a Grade II* listed building.

The manor of Dethick was anciently owned by the eponymous family. On the death in 1403 of Robert Dethick, the heir to the family's property at Dethick (though not the last Dethick male - the family owned land in Breadsall and Newhall in Derbyshire), the property passed to Thomas Babington who had married Isabel, the elder of Robert's two daughters. Babington was the son of Sir John Babington and nephew of Sir William Babington, Chief Justice in 1423.

The son of Isabel and Thomas, Sir John Babington of Dethick (High Sheriff of Derbyshire in 1479) died in 1485 at the Battle of Bosworth Field. His son Thomas and his grandson Anthony both served as High Sheriff.

The manor house, dating from the 15th century, was rebuilt by the Babington family in the 16th century. Anthony Babington, born at the manor house in 1561, was attained and executed for High Treason for his part in the Babington Plot. As a result of his earlier transfer of ownership to his younger brother the sequestration of the estate was avoided.

In the 17th century the Babingtons sold the property. Later owners included Blackwell and Hallowes. The house was eventually used as a farmhouse and was substantially altered and extended for that purpose in the 18th century. Substantial elements of the 15th-century manor house remain incorporated into the present structure.

The manor farm was supplemented by the adjoining Church Farm.

From 2008 to 2021, Dethick Manor Farm had been owned by the television presenter Simon Groom. He and his wife ran the 170-acre (0.69 km^{2}) farm. The Grooms have since sold the property.

Goldie, Simon's dog who appeared alongside him on Blue Peter, is buried on the grounds of Dethick Manor Farm.
