= William Babington =

William Babington may refer to:

- William Babington (academic), Vice-Chancellor of Oxford University, 1441–1443
- William Babington (justice) (c. 1370–1454), English lawyer and judge
- William Babington (physician) (1756–1833), Anglo-Irish physician and mineralogist
- William Babington (East India Company officer) (1806–1878), Anglo-Irish officer

== See also ==
- W. B. Maxwell (William Babington Maxwell, 1866–1938), British novelist
- William Babbington, fictional Royal Navy captain in the novels of Patrick O'Brian
