= William Babington (physician) =

Anglo-Irish physician and mineralogist

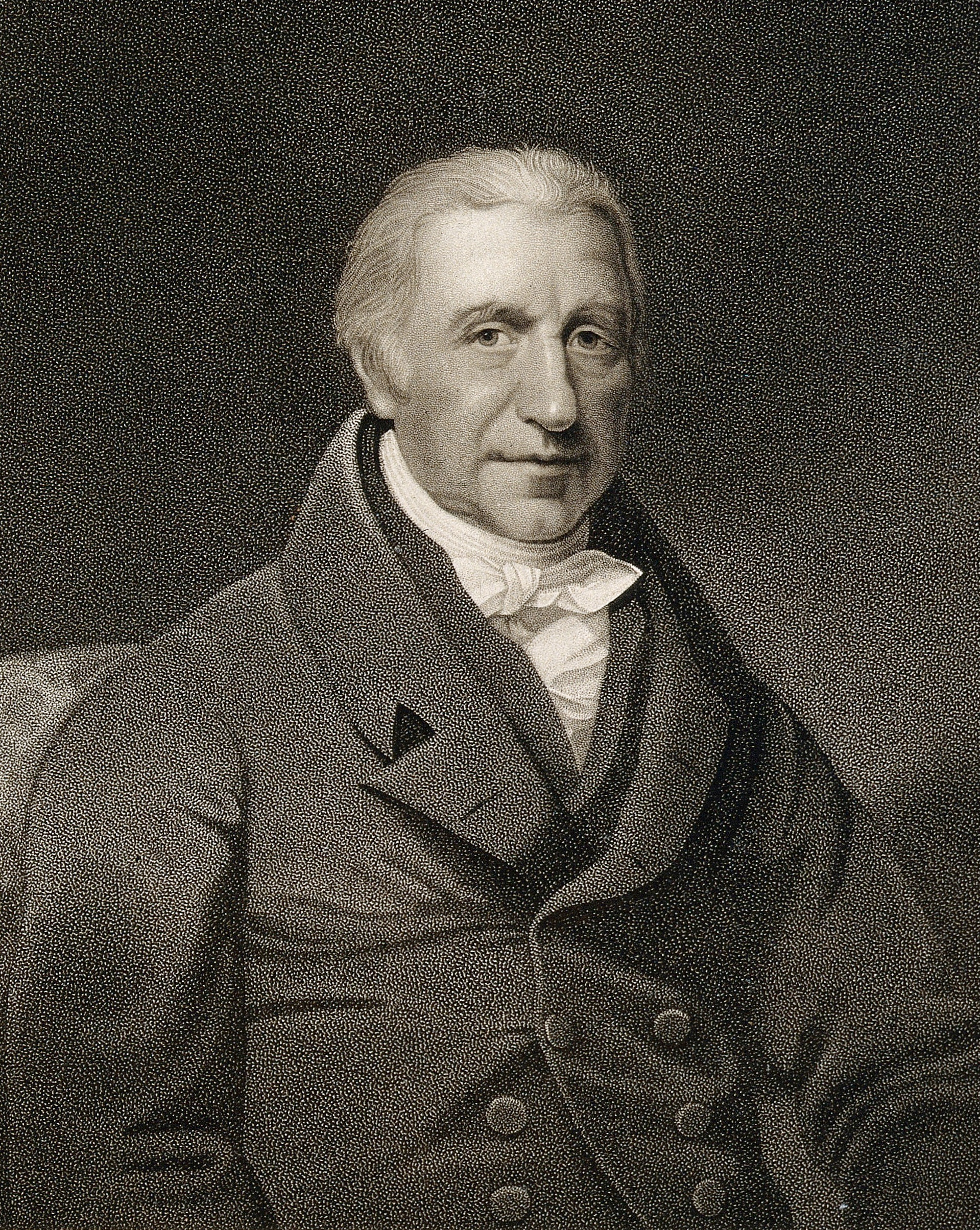
William Babington

William Babington FRS FGS (21 May 1756 – 29 April 1833) was an Anglo-Irish physician and mineralogist.

== Life and work ==
William Babington was born in Portglenone, near Coleraine, Antrim, Ireland. He was the son of Rev. Humphrey Babington, the great-great-grandson of Brutus Babington (sent to Ireland by James VI and I), and his wife Anne (née Buttle). Apprenticed to a practitioner at Londonderry, and afterwards completed his medical education at Guy's Hospital, London, but without at that time taking a medical degree. In 1777 he was made assistant surgeon to Haslar (Naval) Hospital, and held this appointment for four years. He then obtained the position of apothecary to Guy's Hospital, and also lectured on chemistry in the medical school. He resigned the post of apothecary, and, having obtained the necessary degree of MD from the University of Aberdeen in 1795. in 1796 he joined Dr William Saunders at Guy's Hospital in London as his assistant and in 1802/3 (at Saunder's recommendation) replaced Saunders as head Physician.

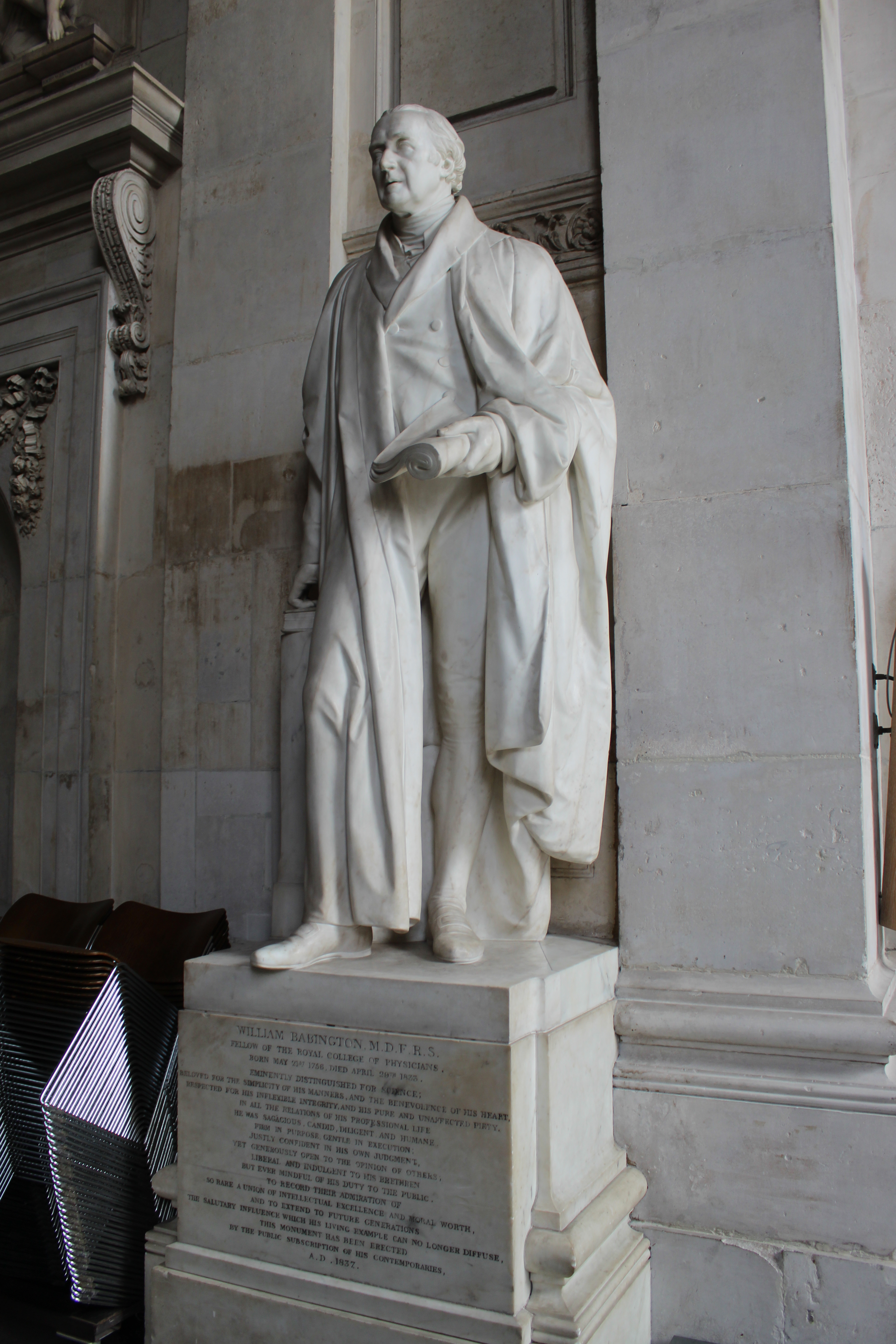
Statue of Babington, St Paul's Cathedral

Babington was physician to Guy's Hospital from 1795 to 1811. He was a founder member of the Geological Society of London and served as president from 1822 to 1824. He was elected as a Fellow of the Royal Society in 1805. In 1817, he was President of the Medical and Chirurgical Society of London.

He was the curator for the enormous mineral collection of John Stuart, 3rd Earl of Bute. When Bute died in 1792, Babington bought the collection. The mineral Babingtonite is named after him.

William and Martha Elizabeth Babington were married before 1794, and had four sons and four daughters between 1794 and 1810. Babington died on 29 April 1833 and was buried at St. Mary Aldermanbury in London. He left a son, Benjamin Guy Babington, also physician to Guy's Hospital, and a daughter, Martha, who married the physician Richard Bright.

A statue of Babington by William Behnes (1795–1864) is in St Paul's Cathedral in London.

Anthony Babington, the Irish politician was a direct descendant, as is Carlos Babington, an Argentinian footballer.

== Selected publications ==
- "A Systematic Arrangement of Minerals, founded on the joint consideration of their chemical, physical and external characters; reduced to the form of tables." (1796) London, T. Cox.
- "A New System of Mineralogy, in the form of a Catalogue, after the manner of Baron Born’s Systematic Catalogue of the collection of fossils of Mlle Éléonore de Raab". (1799) London, T. Bensley. (Referring to Ignaz von Born's catalogue of the collection of Austrian collector Éléonore de Raab)
