= Babbington (surname) =

Babbington is an English surname. Notable people with the surname include:

- Kylie Babbington (born 1987), British actress
- Roy Babbington (born 1940), English rock and jazz bassist

== See also ==
- Babington (surname)
