= Anthony Babington (author) =

British Army officer, judge, and author (1920–2004)

His Honour Anthony Babington
- Royal coat of arms of the United Kingdom

Circuit Judge in London
- In office 1972–1987
- Monarch: Queen Elizabeth II

Metropolitan Stipendary Magistrate
- In office 1964–1972

Personal details
- Born: 4 April 1920
- Died: 10 May 2004 (aged 84)
- Occupation: Judge
- Profession: Barrister
- Awards: Croix de Guerre

Anthony Patrick Babington (4 April 1920, in County Cork – 10 May 2004, in London) was a British author, judge and Army officer.

== Early life ==
Babington was born in County Cork in 1920 to Oscar John Gilmore Babington (1879–1930), also an Army officer, and his wife Annie Honor Wrixon (1878–1975). Among his cousins were Sir Anthony Babington and Robert Babington, a recipient of the Distinguished Service Cross.

In the early stages of his life, Babington grew up in India and England. However, Babington's father died of alcoholism when he was aged 10, so the family were forced to sell their estate in Cork. Babington, his mother and two siblings were continuing to live at Kenley Court, where they had been living in Surrey, in reduced circumstances, whilst Babington attended Reading School.

== Military service ==
Babington was commissioned as an officer and served in the Second World War with the Royal Ulster Rifles and then the Dorset Regiment. In 1944, Babington was injured in the Battle of Arnhem and left for dead until slight movements were detected. It was widely believed that Babington would never be able to walk or talk again, but whilst recuperating at St Hugh's College, Oxford he was able to learn to speak and write, using his left hand, and eventually to walk. He was later awarded the Croix de Guerre for his war service.

== Legal career ==
He was called to the Bar by Middle Temple in 1948, and was eventually appointed a Bencher in 1977. In 1964 he became a metropolitan stipendary magistrate and from 1972 until 1987 he was a circuit judge.

In 1995, he was appointed an Honorary Bencher of King's Inns in Dublin by then President Mary Robinson.

== Personal life ==
Latterly in his life, Babington was in a relationship with Josephine Pullein-Thompson MBE. Babington, at the request of Pullein-Thompson, was active for many years in the writers' organisation PEN International, and he often acted unofficially as a legal adviser. He became a campaigner for increased awareness of disabled people, particularly those leaving the military.

== Publications ==
- No memorial, Heinemann 1 January 1954
- Power to Silence, ISBN 978-0-08-007060-5, Elsevier 1 September 1968
- A house in Bow Street: Crime and the magistracy, London, 1740–1881, ISBN 978-0-356-02849-1, Macdonald & Co 1 January 1969
- The English Bastille: A History of Newgate Gaol and Prison Conditions in Britain 1188–1902, ISBN 978-0-356-03802-5, Macdonald & Co 11 November 1971
- Military Intervention in Britain: From the Gordon Riots to the Gibraltar Incident, ISBN 978-0-415-04374-8, Routledge 17 May 1990
- The devil to pay: The Mutiny of the Connaught Rangers, India, July 1920: Connaught Rangers Revolt in the Punjab, 1920, ISBN 978-0-85052-327-0, Pen & Sword Books Ltd 14 November 1991
- For the Sake of Example: Capital Courts Martial 1914–18 – The Truth, ISBN 978-0-85052-384-3, Leo Cooper 13 September 1993
- The Rule of Law in Britain from the Roman Occupation to the Present Day, ISBN 978-1-872328-07-2, Barry Rose Law Publishers Ltd 1 August 1995
- An Uncertain Voyage, ISBN 0-7089-4887-1, Barry Rose Law Publishers Limited 15 June 2000
- Shell Shock, ISBN 978-1-84468-005-4, Leo Cooper Ltd 21 October 2003
