= Thomas Bailie =

Northern Irish politician (1885–1957)

Thomas Bailie (15 July 1885 – 22 November 1957) was an Ulster Unionist Party (UUP) Member of Parliament (1941–1953) in the Parliament of Northern Ireland, based at Stormont, during which time he was Deputy Speaker.

== Early life and family ==
Bailie was born in Boston, United States, the son of William Bailie and Margaret Crooks – his family was from Newtownards, County Down. Returning to Ireland, Bailie attended the Ward School, Bangor. He was married, in 1908, to Jean Fowler and had six children, Muriel, Winifred, Margaret, Mabel, Maureen and William. He served on Bangor Borough Council from 1913 to 1953.

== Career ==
When the first Prime Minister of Northern Ireland, Lord Craigavon, died in 1940, Bailie was elected as his replacement in the 1941 by-election in North Down. He won the seat as an independent Unionist defeating the UUP candidate. He held his seat in 1945 unopposed, and was elected once more in 1949 as the UUP candidate (with a majority of 11,670 over the Labour Party candidate). By 1953, Bailie was once more an independent; this time he was defeated by Robert Samuel Nixon, the UUP candidate, by 1,097 votes.

Parliament of Northern Ireland
Preceded by James Craig	Member of Parliament for North Down; 1941–1953	Succeeded by Robert Samuel Nixon
