= Robert Samuel Nixon =

Politician in Northern Ireland

Robert Samuel Nixon (22 May 1909 – 21 September 1997) was a unionist politician in Northern Ireland.

Bob Nixon studied at Mountjoy School in Dublin, then at Queen's University, Belfast, where he qualified as a doctor of medicine. At the 1953 Northern Ireland general election, he was elected for the Ulster Unionist Party in North Down.

In 1965, Nixon revealed that unionists in Derry had helped convince the Government of Northern Ireland to site the New University of Ulster in Coleraine, rather than their own city, which had a Roman Catholic majority. In response to this, he was suspended from the Parliamentary party for several months. He stood down at the 1969 Northern Ireland general election, but stood unsuccessfully as an independent Unionist in the 1970 general election, again in North Down.

Parliament of Northern Ireland
| Preceded by Thomas Bailie | Member of Parliament for North Down; 1953–1969 | Succeeded by Robert Babington |
