= Macosquin Abbey =

Cistercian monastery in County Londonderry, Northern Ireland

Coordinates: 55.0992°N 6.7167°W

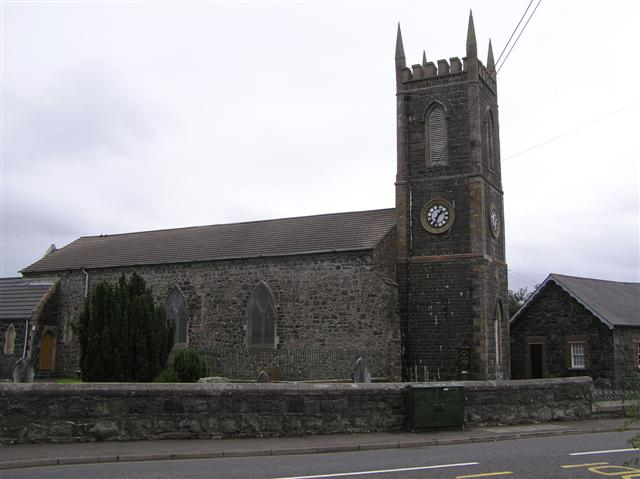
- Church of Ireland church now occupying the site
- Interactive map of Macosquin Abbey

Site
- Location: County Londonderry, Northern Ireland

Macosquin Abbey, formally known as Clarus Fons, was a Cistercian monastery in County Londonderry, Northern Ireland in the United Kingdom. The Monastery was located on Abbey Lane, Macosquin, Northern Ireland.

The abbey may have owned the churches at Burt and Agivey.

== History ==
There may have been a monastic establishment in Macosquin as early as the 6th century, however, the Cistercian Abbey of Our Lady of the Clear Springs was founded in 1217 by monks from the monastery of Morimond, a daughter house of Citeaux in France. Earlier spellings of the village's name are Moycosquin and Moycoscain.

== Dissolution ==
By 1539 the abbey had fallen into a state of disrepair. The Abbey site was occupied at the beginning of the 17th century by a plantation of the London Guild of Merchant Taylors. While Agivey was granted to the Ironmongers’ Company of London. The last remains of the Abbey buildings were removed in the 18th century and the Protestant Church of Saint Mary probably occupies the Abbeys site and may have reused the foundations. Also a Lancet from the 13th century is installed in Saint Mary.

== List of known Abbots ==
| Date | Abbott | Notes |
|---|---|---|
| 1217 | Foundation Abbot not known | Founded by monks of Morimond |
| 1401 | John O’Flannra | Latter became bishop of Derry. |
| 1484 | Raymond O’Donnell | He illegally claimed the abbacy |
| 1484 | Maurice O’Cahan, | a clerk from outside the Abbey appointed abbot. |
| 1505 | Abbot Donough O’Cahan. | was hung illegally |
| 1604 | | Abbey was dissolved |
