= William Babington (East India Company officer) =

Anglo-Irish officer

Major-General William Knox Babington (26 June 1806 – 31 July 1878) was an Anglo-Irish officer of the East India Company commanding Northern District, Madras from 29 November 1867 to 1 December 1868.

He was a cornet in 1826, promoted to lieutenant in 1828, captain in 1846, major in 1852, colonel in 1863, brigadier-general in 1867 and major-general on 22 April 1868.

He lived at 48 Oxford Terrace, Hyde Park, what is now Sussex Gardens. He was a son of Rev. Richard Babington, Rector of Lower Comber (Diocese of Derry) and his wife Mary Boyle. He was a younger brother of Rev. Hume Babington.
