= John Babington (died 1485) =

English noble

Sir John Babington (died 22 August 1485) of Dethick Manor was High Sheriff of Nottinghamshire, Derbyshire and the Royal Forests from 1479-1480.

He was the son of Thomas Babington of Dethick (son of Sir John Babington and Benedicta Ward) and Isabel Dethick. He belonged to the Babington family.

In 1448 he married Isabel Bradbourne, the daughter of Henry Bradbourne and Margery Bagot. This marriage produced the following children

- Sir Thomas Babington (d. 13 March 1518)
- Beatrice Babington, married Ralph Pole
- Anne Babington, married James Rolleston
- Elizabeth Babington, married Ralph Frauncis
- Margaret Babington, married Edmund Pilkington
- Isabell Babington, married John Rosell
- Cecily Babington, married Thomas Samon.

He was appointed High Sheriff of Nottinghamshire, Derbyshire and the Royal Forests in 1479.

He had fought for Edward IV in April 1471 at the Battle of Barnet. He was killed on 22 August 1485 by Sir John Blount fighting for Richard III at the Battle of Bosworth Field on 22 August 1485. He is mentioned in the Ballad of Bosworth Field as one of the nobles supporting Richard III in the 294th line of the ballad within the 74th stanza.
