= North Down (Northern Ireland Parliament constituency) =

Coordinates: 54.626°N 5.673°W

- Former County constituency for the Parliament of Northern Ireland

Former constituency
- Created: 1929
- Abolished: 1973
- Election method: First past the post

North Down was a constituency of the Parliament of Northern Ireland.

== Boundaries ==
North Down was a county constituency comprising part of northern County Down, immediately south east of Belfast. It was created when the House of Commons (Method of Voting and Redistribution of Seats) Act (Northern Ireland) 1929 introduced first-past-the-post elections throughout Northern Ireland. North Down was created by the division of Down into eight new constituencies. The constituency survived unchanged until 1969, when it gained part of Mid Down, but the eastern half of the seat was split away to form Bangor. It returned one Member of Parliament until the Parliament of Northern Ireland was temporarily suspended in 1972, and then formally abolished in 1973.

The original seat was centred on the town of Bangor and urban district of Holywood, and it also included parts of the rural districts of Castlereagh and Newtownards.

== Politics ==
The seat had a substantial unionist majority and was always won by unionist candidates, all but one representing the Ulster Unionist Party. It was sometimes contested by Northern Ireland Labour Party, Ulster Liberal Party and independent Unionist candidates, with only the independent Unionist receiving more than one third of the votes cast.

== Members of Parliament ==
Elected	Party	Name
1929	UUP	James Craig, 1st Viscount Craigavon
1941	Ind. Unionist	Thomas Bailie
1945	UUP	Thomas Bailie
1953	UUP	Robert Samuel Nixon
1969	UUP	Robert Babington

== Election results ==
At the 1929, 1933 and 1938 Northern Ireland general elections, James Craig, 1st Viscount Craigavon was elected unopposed.

North Down by-election, 1941
Party	Candidate	Votes	%	±%
Ind. Unionist	Thomas Bailie	6,268	55.0	New
UUP	R. Workman	5,137	45.0	N/A
Majority		1,131	10.0	N/A
Turnout		11,405	58.4	N/A
Ind. Unionist gain from UUP		Swing	N/A	

At the 1945 Northern Ireland general election, Thomas Bailie was elected unopposed.

General Election 1949: North Down
Party	Candidate	Votes	%	±%
UUP	Thomas Bailie	13,626	87.4	N/A
NI Labour	Sam Napier	1,956	12.6	New
Majority		11,670	74.8	N/A
Turnout		15,582	69.4	N/A
UUP hold		Swing	N/A	

General Election 1953: North Down
Party	Candidate	Votes	%	±%
UUP	Robert Samuel Nixon	7,868	53.7	−33.7
Ind. Unionist	Thomas Bailie	6,771	46.3	New
Majority		1,097	7.4	−67.4
Turnout		14,639	59.1	−10.3
UUP hold		Swing		

At the 1958 Northern Ireland general election, Robert Samuel Nixon was elected unopposed.

General Election 1962: North Down
Party	Candidate	Votes	%	±%
UUP	Robert Samuel Nixon	11,067	68.7	N/A
Ulster Liberal	Arthur Burns	5,044	31.3	New
Majority		6,023	37.4	N/A
Turnout		16,111	58.0	N/A
UUP hold		Swing	N/A	

General Election 1965: North Down
Party	Candidate	Votes	%	±%
UUP	Robert Samuel Nixon	10,307	77.1	+8.4
NI Labour	J. C. Marks	3,066	22.9	New
Majority		7,241	54.2	+16.8
Turnout		13,373	46.0	−12.0
UUP hold		Swing		

General Election 1969: North Down
Party	Candidate	Votes	%	±%
UUP	Robert Babington	9,013	85.2	+8.1
Ulster Liberal	Sheelagh Murnaghan	1,567	14.8	New
Majority		7,446	70.4	+16.2
Turnout		10,580	57.5	+11.5
UUP hold		Swing		
