= Matthew Babington =

English lawyer and politician

Matthew Babington of Rothley Temple (17 May 1612 – September 1669) was an English lawyer and politician who sat in the House of Commons in 1660.

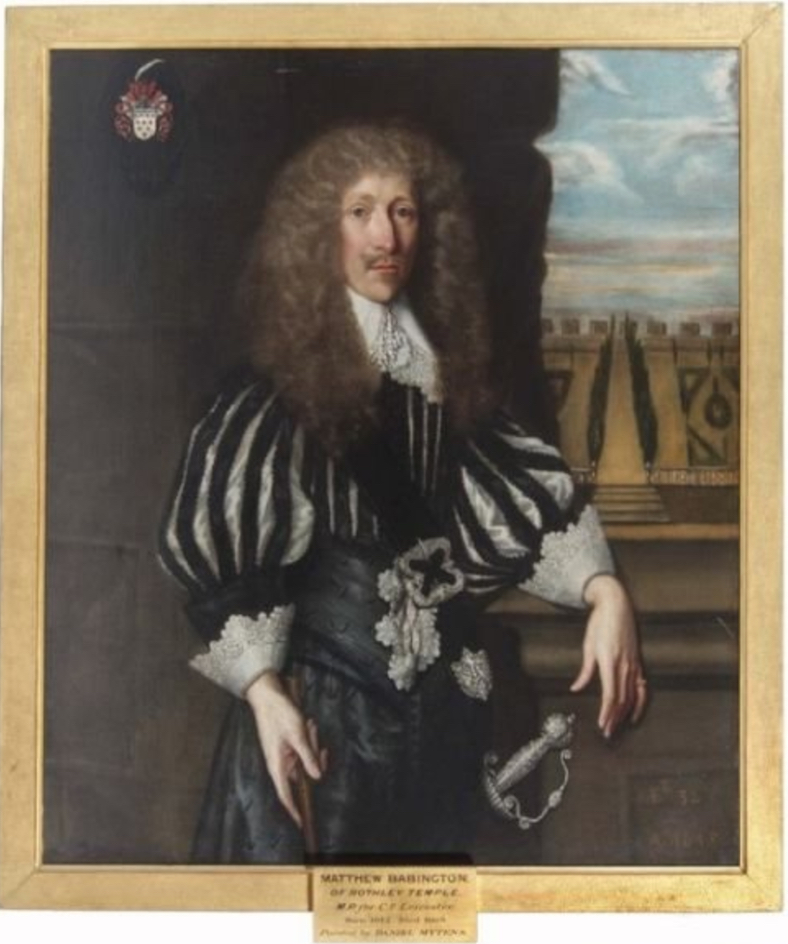
Matthew Babington of Rothley Temple, by Daniel Mytens

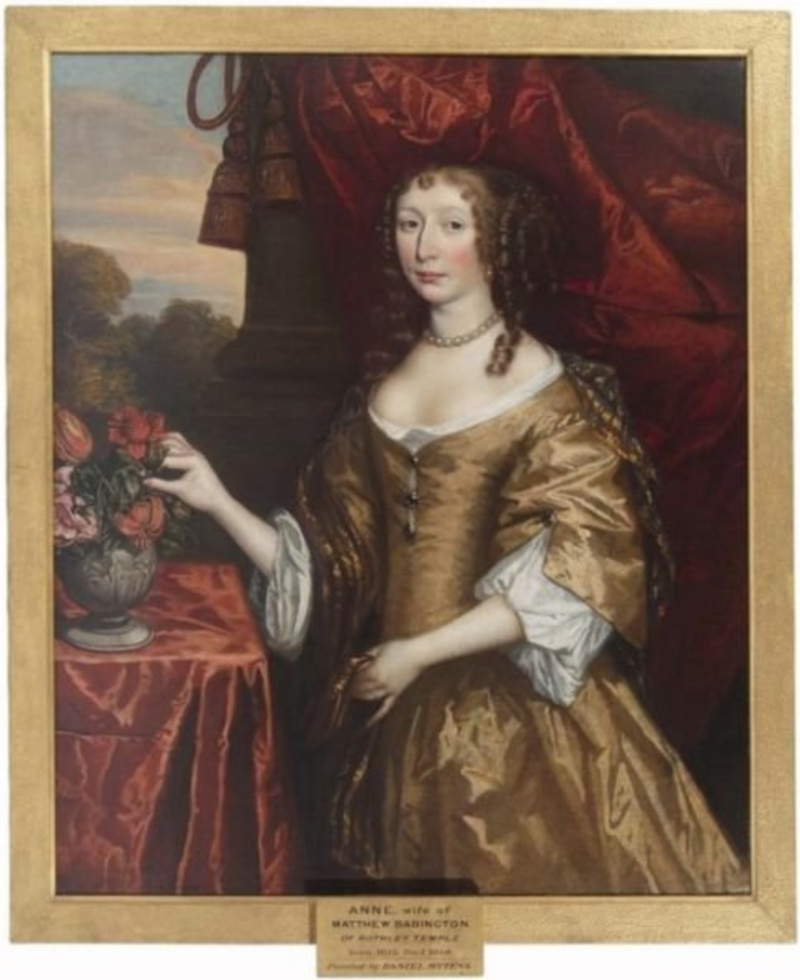
Anne (Hopkins) Babington, 1615-1648, by Daniel Mytens

== Early life and education ==
Matthew was born 17 May 1612, the eldest son of Thomas Babington of Rothley Temple(1568-1645), Leicestershire and his wife Katherine (c.1585-1657), daughter of George Kendall of Smithesby. He graduated from Queens' College, Cambridge at Easter, 1631.

== Professional life ==
He was admitted at the Inner Temple in November 1631 and was called to the bar in 1639.

In 1657 he was appointed Justice of the Peace for Leicestershire, a post he continued to hold until his death in 1669. In 1660 he was also appointed a commander for the Militia, as well as Judge to the oyer and terminer court.

In 1660, he was elected Member of Parliament for Leicestershire in the Convention Parliament. An inactive Member of the Convention, he made no recorded speeches but was appointed to eight committees, of which the most important were to appoint army commissioners and to enable discharged soldiers to exercise trades in corporate towns. On 8 Dec. he carried the estate bill of George Faunt to the Upper House. He is not known to have stood again, and was buried at Rothley on 27 Sept. 1669. Two years later the King obtained a fellowship at Trinity College, Cambridge for his younger son, Matthew, in consideration of Babington’s ‘eminent loyalty ... both to the hazard of his life and impairing his estate’.

== Activities during the Civil War ==
Although his brother was an officer in the New Model Army, and his father was a member of the County Committee, Babington took no known part in the Civil War. In 1653 he asked for and obtained title to the tithes of Gaddesby, part of Rothley rectory, which were detained by a Roman Catholic. But his brother was involved in Booth's Uprising in 1659, and he himself was committed to Lambeth House by the Council of State on a charge of levying war against the Parliament and corresponding with the enemy.

== Personal life ==
Babington married c.1634 Anne Hopkins, daughter of Sampson Hopkins of Coventry in 1634. They had four sons and eight daughters.

== Death ==
He died at the age of 57 and was buried at Rothley on 27 September 1669.
