= Robert Babington =

Irish-born British politician (1920–2010)

Robert Babington DSC, QC

Member of Parliament for North Down
- In office 1969–1972
- Preceded by: Robert Samuel Nixon
- Succeeded by: Constituency abolished

Personal details
- Born: Robert John Babington; 9 April 1920
- Died: 17 September 2010 (aged 90)
- Party: Ulster Unionist Party
- Education: Trinity College Dublin

Robert John Babington, DSC, QC (9 April 1920 – 17 September 2010) was an Ulster Unionist Party politician, who served as the member of the House of Commons of Northern Ireland for North Down from 1969 to 1972, and a county court judge. He was born in Dublin.

== Early life ==
Born into the Anglo-Irish Babington family, the son of David and Alice Babington, Robert Babington was educated at Saint Columba's College, Dublin and Trinity College Dublin. He served the United Kingdom in the Second World War, earning the Distinguished Service Cross, and was aboard the aircraft carrier HMS Formidable for the Battle of Crete as a member of the Royal Navy Volunteer Reserve attached to the Fleet Air Arm. He went on to spend most of his war service in and around the Mediterranean Sea and survived the sinking of HMS Dasher. He subsequently embarked on a career in law and politics in Northern Ireland. He married Elizabeth Alton, the daughter of Ernest Alton, in 1952; the couple had had two sons (Philip Babington and David Babington) and a daughter (Bryanna Jane Babington).

He was a great-grandson of The Rev. Hume Babington and a first cousin once removed to Sir Anthony Babington.

== Politics ==
Although he argued in 1961 in favour of discrimination in favour of unionists in employment, Babington became known as a moderate within the UUP. He supported the principle of full and equal voting rights during his 1969 campaign and advocated the expulsion of any party member who refused to follow the edicts of the British government fully. He was a staunch critic of any Unionist involvement in political violence and a vocal opponent of Ulster nationalism. The collapse of the Parliament was the effective end of Babington's career in politics and he left the Orange Order in 1973.

== Law ==
Babington was called to the bar in 1947 and was made a QC in 1965. During the early part of the Troubles Babington served as prosecuting counsel at a number of high=profile trials related to the conflict. He was appointed as a county court judge in 1974, retiring in 1992.

Parliament of Northern Ireland
Preceded by Robert Samuel Nixon	Member of Parliament for North Down; 1969–1973	Parliament abolished
