= Agivey Abbey =

Monastic site in County Londonderry, Northern Ireland

Coordinates: 55.044867°N 6.59636°W

Agivey Monastery was an early monastic site in Northern Ireland.

It was purportedly founded in the 7th century by Goarcus of Aghadowey. It subsequently became a dependency of the Abbey of St. Mary-de-la-Fonta, which was founded in 1172 and to which this district became a grange. The monastery was dissolved in 1604, and the land was granted to the Ironmongers’ Company of London.

The site is in the east of County Londonderry, 7 miles (11 km) south of Coleraine, close to the River Bann.
