= Babingtonite =

Single chain inosilicate mineral

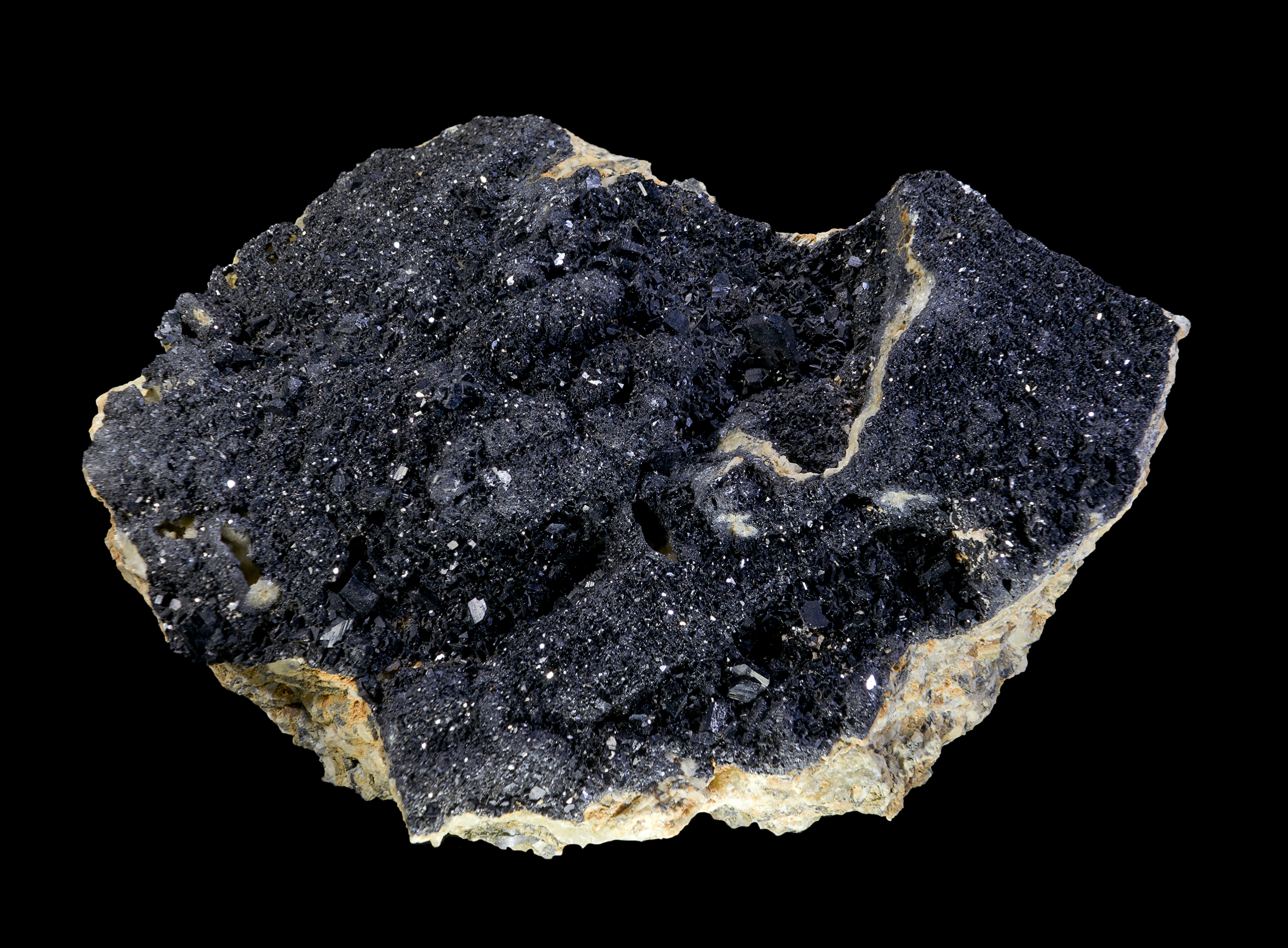

General
- Category: Inosilicate
- Formula: Ca_{2}(Fe,Mn)FeSi_{5}O_{14}(OH)
- IMA symbol: Bab
- Strunz classification: 9.DK.05
- Crystal system: Triclinic
- Crystal class: Pinacoidal (1̅) (same H-M symbol)
- Space group: P1̅

Identification
- Color: Dark green to black
- Crystal habit: Prismatic crystals
- Cleavage: Perfect on {001}, Good on {010} and {100}
- Fracture: Irregular/uneven
- Tenacity: Brittle
- Mohs scale hardness: 5.5 to 6
- Luster: Vitreous
- Diaphaneity: Translucent on thin edges, opaque
- Specific gravity: 3.3
- Refractive index: n_{α}= 1.700 n_{β}= 1.710 n_{γ}= 1.725
- Birefringence: δ = 0.025
- Pleochroism: Visible
- Dispersion: r > v strong

Babingtonite is a calcium iron manganese inosilicate mineral with the formula Ca_{2}(Fe,Mn)FeSi_{5}O_{14}(OH). It is unusual in that iron(III) completely replaces the aluminium so typical of silicate minerals. It is a very dark green to black translucent (in thin crystals or splinters) mineral crystallizing in the triclinic system with typically radial short prismatic clusters and druzy coatings. It occurs with zeolite minerals in cavities in volcanic rocks. Babingtonite contains both iron(II) and iron(III) and shows weak magnetism. It has a Mohs hardness of 5.5 to 6 and a specific gravity of 3.3.

It was first described in 1824 from samples from Arendal in Nedenes county, Norway (which is its type locality) and was named after the Irish physician and mineralogist William Babington (1757–1833).

It is the official mineral (mineral emblem) of the Commonwealth of Massachusetts. The first published report of babingtonite in Massachusetts was by Francis Alger in 1844, who credited Thomas Nuttall with its discovery in Charlestown (now Somerville). The location was the Granite Street quarry, formerly known as the Milk Row quarry.

== Gallery ==
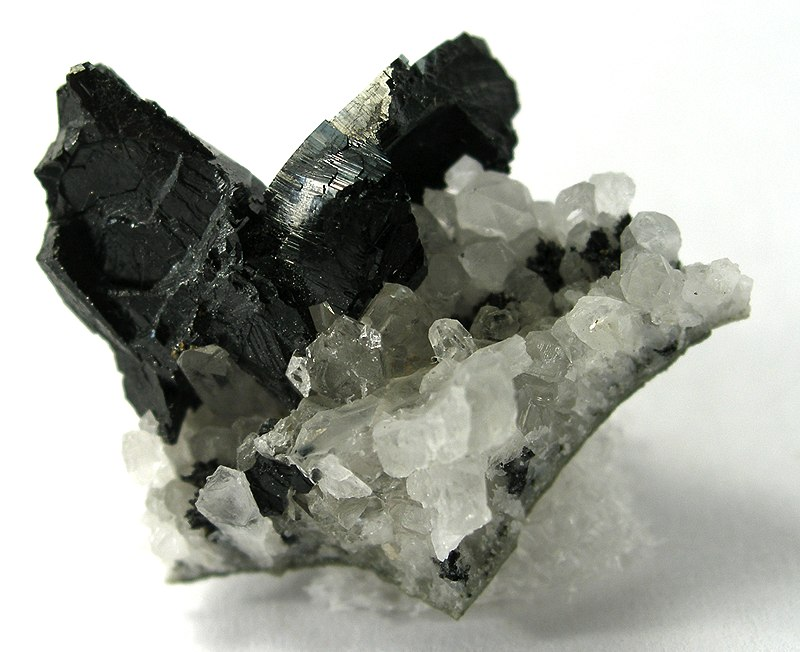
Jet black babingtonite from Lane Quarry, Northfield, Franklin County, Massachusetts, US

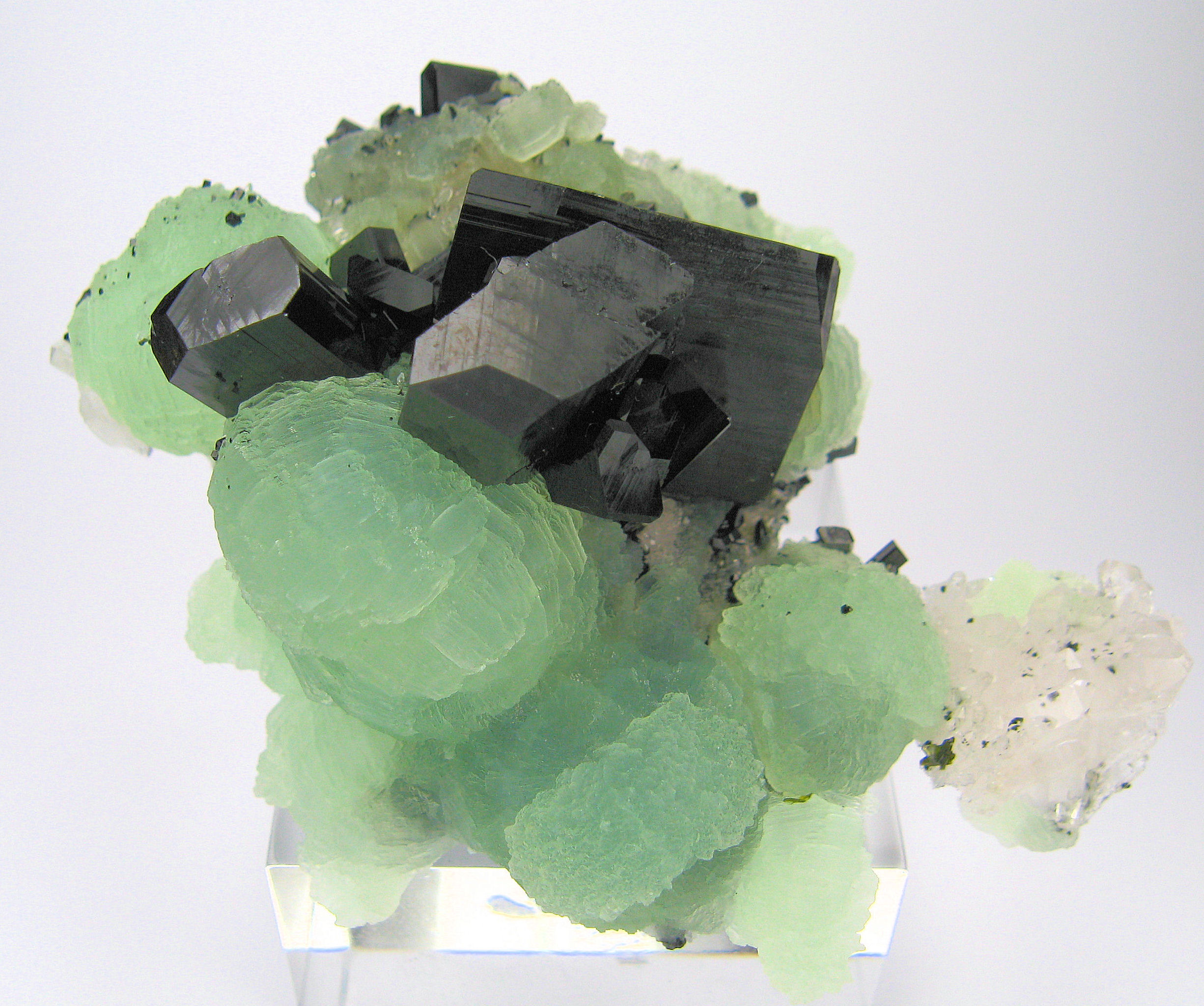
Triclinic crystals of babingtonite with prehnite, from Qiaojia, Qiaojia Co., Zhaotong, Yunnan, China

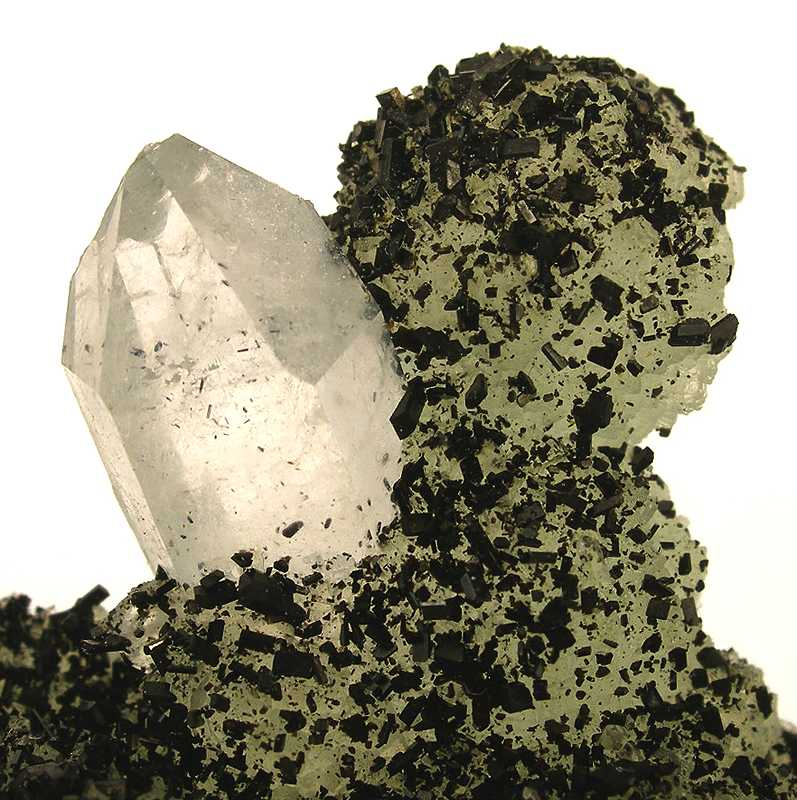
Black babingtonite which covers a matrix of botryoidal, green prehnite, and a large, colorless, doubly terminated quartz crystal

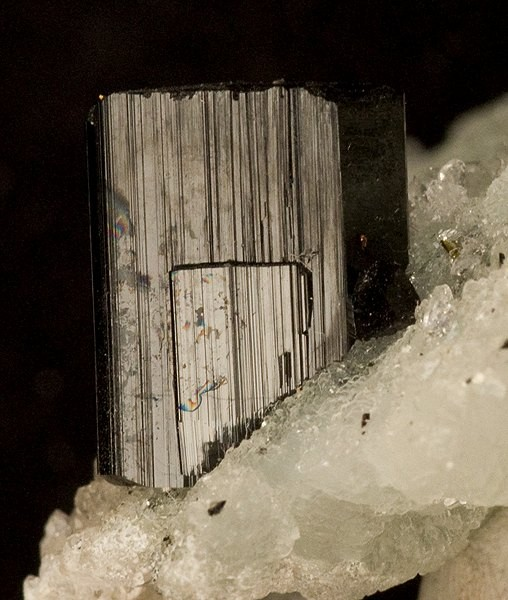
Babingtonite (dark) on prehnite, Qiaojia, Qiaojia County, Yunnan Province, China
