= Richard Babington (Archdeacon of Exeter) =

Richard Hamilton Babington (30 November 1901 – 9 June 1984) was Archdeacon of Exeter from 1958 to 1970; and Treasurer of Exeter Cathedral from 1962 to 1970.

His father, also called Richard, was an Anglican priest. He was educated at Malvern and Keble College, Oxford. After a curacy at Banstead he held incumbencies in Southampton and Ipswich. He was a canon of St Edmundsbury Cathedral from 1947 to 1958.
