= Benjamin Guy Babington =

English physician and epidemiologist

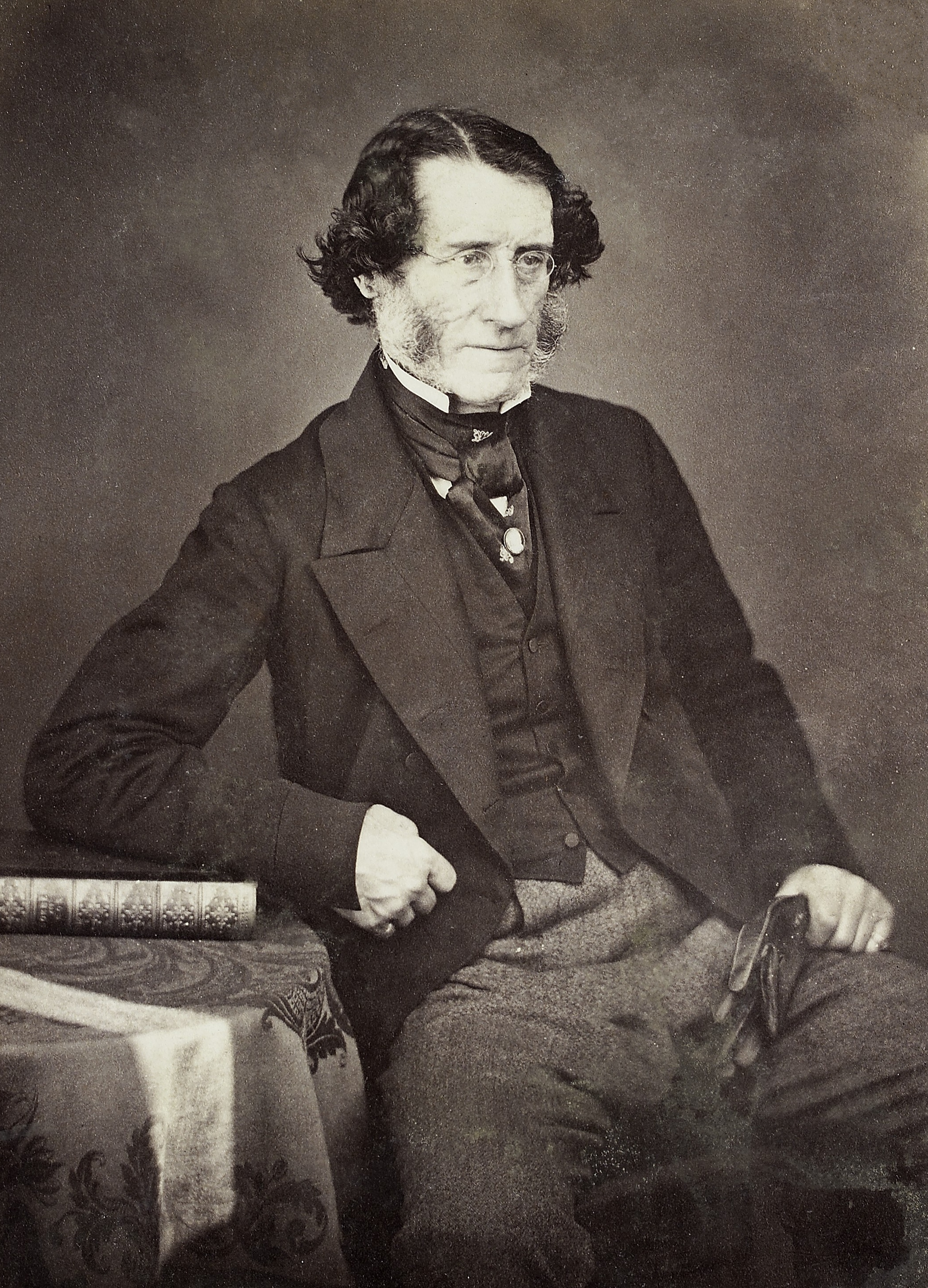
Benjamin Guy Babington c. 1866

Benjamin Guy Babington (5 March 1794 – 8 April 1866) was an English physician and epidemiologist.

== Life ==
Benjamin Babington was born on 5 March 1794, the son of the physician and mineralogist William Babington (1756–1833) and his wife, Martha Elizabeth (née Hough) Babington.

After serving as a midshipman and studying at Charterhouse School from 1803 to 1807 and then the East India Company College at Haileybury until 1812, he worked in government at Madras, India. Returning to England, he studied medicine at Guy's Hospital and Cambridge, receiving his doctorate in 1831. He then became Assistant Physician at Guy's but resigned after a disagreement in 1855. During his career, he invented several medical instruments (including the first laryngoscope) and techniques. He performed the first laryngoscopy with his glottiscope in 1829. He became a Fellow of the Royal College of Physicians. According to Henry Morley, he also "distinguished himself by inquiries into the cholera epidemic in 1832".

He was Secretary to The Royal Asiatic Society of Great Britain and Ireland and in March, 1828 elected a Fellow of the Royal Society. In 1834–1836 he was President of the Hunterian Society. He was a censor and Croonian Lecturer (1841) at the Royal College of Physicians. In 1850 he was elected the founding President of the Epidemiological Society of London and served in that capacity to within months of his death. At least one authority refers to the founding as the beginning of modern epidemiology. In 1853–1855 he was president of the Pathological Society of London and 1863 was also president of the Royal Medical and Chirurgical Society.

Babington died on 8 April 1866.

== Publications ==
He wrote several papers, and translated several others, including:

- four papers from Justus Friedrich Karl Hecker's Epidemics of the Middle Ages.
- Ernst, Baron von Feuchtersleben's Principles of Medical Psychology.

== Family ==
Babington was named after his father's best friend Benjamin Fayle, and the fact that he was born in Guy's Hospital. He married Fayle's daughter Anna Mary, who gave him four children. He also became a director of B. Fayle and Co. (Merchants) together with his sister-in-law (Charlotte Fayle) and his brother-in-law (Rev. Richard Fayle). Benjamin Guy Babington's son - Stephen Piele Babington also became a director of B.Fayle & Co.
