= John Babington (mathematician) =

British mathematician

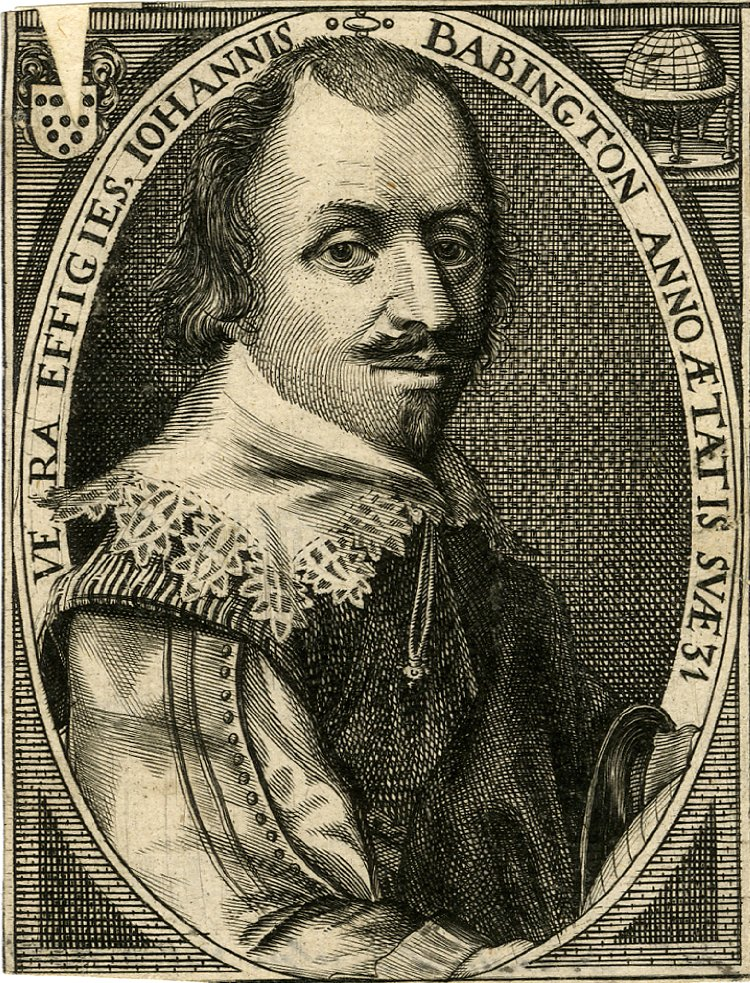
John Babington in title page of his Pyrotechnia, or a Discourse of Artificiall Fireworks, engraving, 1635.

John Babington (fl. 1635), was an English mathematician and gunner.

Babington published in 1635 a folio volume, entitled Pyrotechnia, or a Discourse of Artificiall Fireworks, to which was added a "Short Treatise of Geometrie . . . with the tables for the square root to 25,000, and the cubick root to 10,000 Latus, wherein all roots under those numbers . . . are extracted onely by ocular inspection." The first part of the book, which dealt with the use of fireworks for military purposes as well as for amusements, was dedicated to the "Earl of Newport, Master of his Majesties Ordnance," and in the preface the author says of himself, "I have been for certaine yeeres past, and so at present am, one of the inferiour gunners of his Majestie."

Three copies of English verses in praise of the author are prefixed, of which one is by John Bate, the author of "Mysteries of Nature and Art." The second part, the geometrical treatise, was especially designed for the use of guns, and is dedicated to "Sir John Heyden, Lieutenant of his Majesties Ordnance."

The logarithmic tables, which form the third part of the book, were the earliest published in England.
