= Richard Babington (Dean of Cork) =

Richard Babington (4 February 1869 – 11 December 1952) was Dean of Cork from 1914 to 1951.

Babington was educated at Foyle College and Trinity College, Dublin and ordained in 1892. After a curacy at Drumragh he was the Rector of Moville.

His son was Archdeacon of Exeter from 1958 to 1970.
