= Anthony Babington (Nottingham MP) =

English politician (1476–1536)

Sir Anthony Babington (1476 – 23 August 1536), was an English politician.

He was the 1st son of Thomas Babington of Dethick by Edith Fitzherbert, daughter of Ralph Fitzherbert of Norbury, Derbyshire.

He was educated at the Inner Temple and was appointed Recorder of Nottingham in 1525.

He was a Member (MP) of the Parliament of England for Nottingham in 1529 and 1536. He was High Sheriff of Nottinghamshire, Derbyshire and the Royal Forests from 1533 to 1534.

He was responsible for the addition of the tower of St John the Baptist's Church, Dethick between 1530 and 1532.

== Marriages and children ==
He married twice. Firstly on 20 March 1498, to Elizabeth Ormond (d. 1505), daughter of John Ormond of Alfreton, Derbyshire and Joan Charworth / Chaworth. The children from this marriage were:

- Bernard Babington
- Thomas Babington (c. 1500–1560)
- Edward Babington

Secondly, Catherine Cotton, daughter of Sir John Ferrers of Tamworth, Staffs., widow of Thomas Cotton of Hamstall Ridware, Staffordshire. The children from this marriage were:

- Richard Babington (d. 1550)
- Katherine Babington (b. 1512)
- Elizabeth Babington
- John Babington
