= Northern Ireland Parliament constituencies =

List of constituencies in the Northern Ireland House of Commons (1921–1972)

Northern Ireland Parliamentary Constituencies
- Map of Northern Ireland's Parliamentary Constituencies from 1929-1969
- Category: Electoral district
- Location: Northern Ireland
- Number: 48+4 (from QUB)
- Government: House of Commons of Northern Ireland

The Northern Ireland House of Commons existed from 1921 to 1973 as the lower House of the devolved legislature of the part of the United Kingdom called Northern Ireland.

As in the UK Parliament the constituencies were classified as borough, county or university constituencies.

From 1921 to 1929, the 52 Members of Parliament were elected using proportional representation by the single transferable vote in multi-member constituencies established under the Government of Ireland Act 1920, which also established the same constituencies as one-member or two-member constituencies to the UK Parliament.

Between 1929 and 1969, under the House of Commons (Method of Voting and Redistribution of Seats) Act (Northern Ireland) 1929, there were 48 single-member constituencies, elected by first past the post. The non-territorial Queen's University of Belfast constituency continued to return 4 members using the single transferable vote.

From the 1969 election, under the Electoral Law Act (Northern Ireland) 1968, university representation was ended and 4 new territorial constituencies were created. The 52 constituencies ceased to exist after the Parliament of Northern Ireland was suspended in 1972 and abolished in 1973.

Period	Constituency	Type	Notes
1921–1929	Antrim	county	7 MPs
1929–1973	Antrim Borough	county	
1929–1973	Bann Side	county	
1929–1973	Carrick	county	
1969–1973	Larkfield	county	
1929–1973	Larne	county	
1929–1973	Mid Antrim	county	
1969–1973	Newtownabbey	county	
1929–1973	North Antrim	county	
1929–1973	South Antrim	county	
1921–1929	Armagh	county	4 MPs
1929–1973	Central Armagh	county	
1929–1973	Mid Armagh	county	
1929–1973	North Armagh	county	
1929–1973	South Armagh	county	
1929–1973	Belfast Ballynafeigh	borough	
1929–1973	Belfast Bloomfield	borough	
1929–1973	Belfast Central	borough	
1929–1973	Belfast Clifton	borough	
1929–1973	Belfast, Cromac	borough	
1929–1973	Belfast Dock	borough	
1929–1973	Belfast Duncairn	borough	
1921–1929	Belfast East	borough	4 MPs
1929–1973	Belfast Falls	borough	
1921–1929	Belfast North	borough	4 MPs
1929–1973	Belfast Oldpark	borough	
1929–1973	Belfast Pottinger	borough	
1929–1973	Belfast St Anne's	borough	
1929–1973	Belfast Shankill	borough	
1921–1929	Belfast South	borough	4 MPs
1929–1973	Belfast Victoria	borough	
1921–1929	Belfast West	borough	4 MPs
1929–1973	Belfast Willowfield	borough	
1929–1973	Belfast Windsor	borough	
1929–1973	Belfast Woodvale	borough	
1921–1929	Down	county	8 MPs
1929–1973	Ards	county	
1969–1973	Bangor	county	
1929–1973	East Down	county	
1929–1973	Iveagh	county	
1969–1973	Lagan Valley	county	
1929–1973	Mid Down	county	
1929–1973	Mourne	county	
1929–1973	North Down	county	
1929–1973	South Down	county	
1929–1973	West Down	county	
1921–1929	Fermanagh and Tyrone	county	8 MPs
1929–1973	Enniskillen	county	
1929–1973	Lisnaskea	county	
1929–1973	South Fermanagh	county	
1921–1929	Londonderry	county	5 MPs
1929–1973	City of Londonderry	borough	
1929–1973	Foyle	borough	
1929–1973	Mid Londonderry	county	
1929–1973	North Londonderry	county	
1929–1973	South Londonderry	county	
1921–1969	Queen's University, Belfast	university	4 MPs
1929–1973	East Tyrone	county	
1929–1973	Mid Tyrone	county	
1929–1973	North Tyrone	county	
1929–1973	South Tyrone	county	
1929–1973	West Tyrone	county	

== Historical representation by party ==
=== Antrim ===
Constituency	1921	1925	1929	1933	37	1938	39	43	45	1945	46	1949	50	51	1953	1958	60	1962	1965	68	1969	70	71	72
Antrim / South Antrim (1929)	Barbour U													McConnell U						Ferguson U		Beattie PU	--> DUP	
Antrim / Antrim Borough (1929)	H. O'Neill U		H. Minford U											N. Minford U										
Antrim / Larne (1929)	Hanna U				Robinson U					Topping U							Craig U							
Antrim / Mid Antrim (1929)	Crawford U					J. Patrick U						Wilson U			Simpson U									
Antrim / Bann Side (1929)	Megaw U	Henderson UnbT	Young U				M. Patrick U				T. O'Neill U											Paisley PU	--> DUP	
Antrim / Carrick (1929)	Gordon U							Campbell U	Curran U				Hunter U						Ardill U		Dickson U			
Antrim / North Antrim (1929)	Devlin N	McAllister N	Lynn U						McCleery U							P. O'Neill U								--> A

=== Belfast ===
Constituency	1921	1925	1929	1933	34	37	1938	40	42	43	1945	49	1949	50	1953	56	1958	59	60	61	1962	1965	1969	70	71
East Belfast / B Pottinger (1929)	Bates U	Beattie NIL			JB IndL				JB NIL	JB InL	JB FL	JB InL	Rodgers U				Boyd NIL						Cardwell U		
East Belfast / B Bloomfield (1929)	H. Dixon U													D. Dixon U						Scott U					
East Belfast / B Dock (1929)	Donald U	Gyle IU	Blakiston-Houston U	Midgley NIL			Clark U				Downey NIL		Cole U		Morgan IL		Oliver U				Fitt IL	GF RL		GF SDLP	
East Belfast / B Victoria (1929)	Duff U	Bates U									Alexander U				W. Henderson U		Bleakley NIL					Bradford U			
North Belfast / B Clifton (1929)	Campbell U		S. Hall-Thompson U												Porter IU		Kinahan U	Morgan U					L. Hall-Thompson IU		
North Belfast / B Oldpark (1929)	McGuffin U	Kyle NIL	Hungerford U								Getgood NIL		Morgan U				Simpson NIL								
North Belfast / B Duncairn (1929)	Grant U											Hanna U				Fitzsimmons U									
North Belfast / B Shankill (1929)	McKeown U	T. Henderson IU				TH IUA		TH IU							Holmes U				Boal U					DB IU	DB DUP
South Belfast	Moles U																								
South Belfast	Pollock U																								
South Belfast	McCullagh U																								
South Belfast	McMordie U																								
West Belfast	Burn U																								
West Belfast	Lynn U																								
West Belfast	Twaddell U																								
West Belfast	Devlin U																								

=== Down ===
Constituency	1921	1925	1929	1933	1938	1945	1949	1953	1958	1962	1965	1969
Down	Craig U											
Down	de Valera SF											
Down	Andrews U											
Down	Lavery U											
Down	Mulholland U											
Down	McBride U											
Down	McMullan U											
Down	O'Neill N											

=== Fermanagh and Tyrone ===
Constituency	1921	1925	1929	1933	1938	1945	1949	1953	1958	1962	1965	1969
Fermanagh and Tyrone	Griffith SF											
Fermanagh and Tyrone	Archdale U											
Fermanagh and Tyrone	Coote U											
Fermanagh and Tyrone	Milroy SF											
Fermanagh and Tyrone	Miller U											
Fermanagh and Tyrone	Cooper U											
Fermanagh and Tyrone	O'Mahony SF											
Fermanagh and Tyrone	Harbison N											

=== Londonderry ===
Constituency	1921	1925	1929	1933	1938	1945	1949	1953	1958	1962	1965	1969
Londonderry	Anderson U											
Londonderry	MacNeill SF											
Londonderry	Chichester U											
Londonderry	Mark U											
Londonderry	Leeke N											

=== Queen's University ===
Constituency	1921	1925	1929	1933	1938	1945	1949	1953	1958	1962	1965	1969
Queen's University of Belfast	Campbell U											
Queen's University of Belfast	Johnstone U											
Queen's University of Belfast	Robb U											
Queen's University of Belfast	Morrison U											

Sources:

- Northern Ireland Parliamentary Election Results 1921–1972, compiled and edited by Sydney Elliott (Political Reference Publications 1973)
- For the exact definition of constituency boundaries see http://www.election.demon.co.uk/stormont/boundaries.html
