= List of members of the 1st House of Commons of Northern Ireland =

The 1st House of Commons of Northern Ireland was elected at the 1921 Northern Ireland general election.

All members of the Northern Ireland House of Commons are listed. Only Unionist members took their seats. Sinn Féin members sat instead in the republicans Second Dáil, alongside those elected to the Southern Ireland House of Commons; while Nationalist Party members refused to sit in either the Northern Ireland Parliament or the republican Dáil.

Sir James Craig, (later Viscount Craigavon) was appointed Prime Minister of Northern Ireland on 7 June 1921.

== Members ==
Name	Constituency	Party
Milne Barbour	Antrim	Unionist Party
Maj. Hon. Robert William O'Neill	Antrim	Unionist Party
George Boyle Hanna	Antrim	Unionist Party
Robert Crawford	Antrim	Unionist Party
Robert Megaw	Antrim	Unionist Party
John Fawcett Gordon	Antrim	Unionist Party
Joseph Devlin	Antrim	Nationalist Party
Richard Best	Armagh	Unionist Party
Michael Collins	Armagh	Sinn Féin
Maj. David Shillington	Armagh	Unionist Party
John Dillon Nugent	Armagh	Nationalist Party
Sir Dawson Bates	East Belfast	Unionist Party
Capt. Herbert Dixon	East Belfast	Unionist Party
Thompson Donald	East Belfast	Unionist Party
James Augustine Duff	East Belfast	Unionist Party
Lloyd Campbell	North Belfast	Unionist Party
Samuel McGuffin	North Belfast	Unionist Party
William Grant	North Belfast	Unionist Party
Robert McKeown	North Belfast	Unionist Party
Thomas Moles	South Belfast	Unionist Party
Hugh Pollock	South Belfast	Unionist Party
Sir Crawford McCullagh	South Belfast	Unionist Party
Julia McMordie	South Belfast	Unionist Party
Thomas Henry Burn	West Belfast	Unionist Party
Robert Lynn	West Belfast	Unionist Party
William Twaddell	West Belfast	Unionist Party
Joseph Devlin	West Belfast	Nationalist Party
Sir James Craig, Bt	Down	Unionist Party
Éamon de Valera	Down	Sinn Féin
J. M. Andrews	Down	Unionist Party
Thomas Lavery	Down	Unionist Party
Capt. Hon. Harry Mulholland	Down	Unionist Party
Robert McBride	Down	Unionist Party
Thomas McMullan	Down	Unionist Party
Patrick O'Neill	Down	Nationalist Party
Arthur Griffith	Fermanagh and Tyrone	Sinn Féin
Edward Archdale	Fermanagh and Tyrone	Unionist Party
William Coote	Fermanagh and Tyrone	Unionist Party
Seán Milroy	Fermanagh and Tyrone	Sinn Féin
William Thomas Miller	Fermanagh and Tyrone	Unionist Party
James Cooper	Fermanagh and Tyrone	Unionist Party
Seán O'Mahony	Fermanagh and Tyrone	Sinn Féin
Thomas Harbison	Fermanagh and Tyrone	Nationalist Party
Sir Robert Anderson	Londonderry	Unionist Party
Eoin MacNeill	Londonderry	Sinn Féin
Dehra Chichester	Londonderry	Unionist Party
John Martin Mark	Londonderry	Unionist Party
George Leeke	Londonderry	Nationalist Party
Dr John Campbell	Queen's University of Belfast	Unionist Party
Prof. Robert Johnstone	Queen's University of Belfast	Unionist Party
John Hanna Robb	Queen's University of Belfast	Unionist Party
Dr Hugh Morrison	Queen's University of Belfast	Unionist Party

== Notes ==
- Joseph Devlin was elected for both Antrim and Belfast West, but did not take either seat in parliament.
- Maj. Hon. Robert William O'Neill was Speaker of the House from 7 June 1921 to 2 May 1929.

== Changes ==
- William Twaddell (UUP, Belfast West) was assassinated by the IRA on 22 May 1922. The by-election on 2 May 1923 was won by Philip James Woods (Independent Unionist).
