= Northern Ireland constituency election results in the 1929 United Kingdom general election =

33rd Parliament	(1923)
34th Parliament	(1924)
35th Parliament	(1929)
36th Parliament	(1931)
37th Parliament	(1935)

Results of the election by constituency

This is a complete alphabetical list of election results from constituencies in Northern Ireland to the 35th Parliament of the United Kingdom at the 1929 general election, held on 30 May 1929.

== Northern Ireland ==
- Change in % vote and swing is calculated between the winner and second place and their respective performances at the 1924 election. A plus denotes a swing to the winner and a minus against the winner.

Antrim (2 seats)
Party	Candidate	Votes	%	±%
UUP	Hugh O'Neill	53,864	37.5	−11.4
UUP	Joseph McConnell	52,851	36.8	n/a
Ulster Liberal	George Henderson	18,985	13.2	n/a
Ulster Liberal	Robert Boyd	17,824	12.4	n/a
Majority		33,866	23.6	
Turnout		72,314	58.6	−5.6
UUP hold		Swing	n/a	

Armagh
Party	Candidate	Votes	%	±%
UUP	William Allen	26,966	67.4	−3.8
Ulster Liberal	William Todd	13,052	32.6	n/a
Majority		13,914	34.8	−7.5
Turnout		40,018	60.2	−14.8
UUP hold		Swing	n/a	

Belfast East
Party	Candidate	Votes	%	±%
UUP	Herbert Dixon	27,855	75.1	n/a
Ulster Liberal	Denis Ireland	9,230	24.9	n/a
Majority		18,625	50.2	n/a
Turnout		37,085	65.7	n/a'
UUP hold		Swing	n/a	

Belfast North
Party	Candidate	Votes	%	±%
UUP	Thomas Somerset	27,812	62.1	−34.5
Ind. Unionist	Tommy Henderson	10,909	24.4	n/a
Independent	David Wilson	6,059	13.5	n/a
Majority		16,903	37.8	−55.5
Turnout		44,780	72.9	−2.5
UUP hold		Swing	n/a	

Belfast South
Party	Candidate	Votes	%	±%
UUP	William Stewart	24,019	62.9	n/a
Ind. Unionist	Philip James Woods	14,148	37.1	n/a
Majority		9,871	25.9	n/a
Turnout		38,167	64.7	n/a
UUP hold		Swing	n/a	

Belfast West
Party	Candidate	Votes	%	±%
UUP	William Edward David Allen	33,274	57.9	+ 3.4
Ind. Republican	Frank MacDermot	24,177	42.1	N/A
Majority		9,097	15.8	+ 1.7
Turnout			73.9	– 5.2
UUP hold		Swing	n/a	

Down (2 Seats)
Party	Candidate	Votes	%	±%
UUP	David Reid	54,073	36.3	−10.2
UUP	John Morrow Simms	53,943	36.2	−10.2
Ulster Liberal	Robert Pollock	20,999	14.1	n/a
Ulster Liberal	David Johnston	20,013	13.4	n/a
Turnout			58.5	−7.3
UUP hold		Swing	n/a	
UUP hold		Swing	n/a	

Fermanagh and Tyrone
Party	Candidate	Votes	%	±%
Nationalist	Joseph Devlin	unopposed	n/a	n/a
Nationalist	Thomas Harbison	unopposed	n/a	n/a
Nationalist gain from UUP		Swing	n/a	

Londonderry
Party	Candidate	Votes	%	±%
UUP	Ronald Ross	unopposed	n/a	n/a
UUP hold		Swing	n/a	
