= 1923 Belfast West by-election =

The 1923 Belfast West by-election was held on 2 May 1923, following the assassination of William Twaddell, the sitting MP.

It was won by Philip James Woods standing as the Fighting Colonel, an independent Unionist separate from the official Unionist party.

== Campaign ==
Woods campaigned on a platform of ultra-loyalism and working-class grievances.

== Result ==
1923 Belfast West by-election
Party	Candidate	Votes	%	±%
Ind. Unionist	Philip James Woods	25,761	55.3	New
UUP	Joseph Davison	19,360	41.6	−20.0
Majority		7,859	13.7	N/A
Turnout		46,597	69.3	−23.0
Ind. Unionist gain from UUP		Swing		

== Aftermath ==
Woods stood in 1925 in both Belfast West and Belfast South, winning both seats, but opting to sit for Belfast West.
