= Belfast South =

Belfast South can refer to:

- The southern part of Belfast
- Belfast South (Assembly constituency)
- Belfast South (Northern Ireland Parliament constituency)
- Belfast South (UK Parliament constituency)
