= Anthony Babington (politician, born 1877) =

Anglo-Irish barrister, judge and politician

The Right Honourable Sir Anthony Babington KC
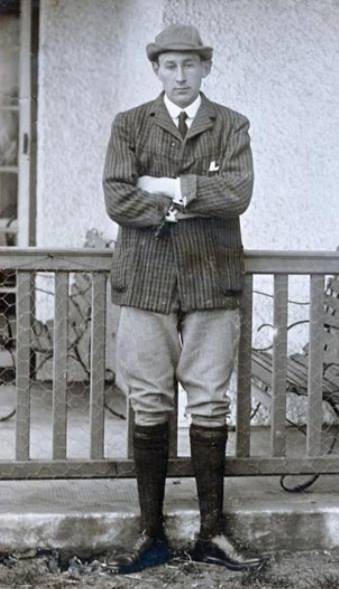

Lord Justice of Appeal
- In office 1937–1949
- Monarch: George VI

Attorney General for Northern Ireland
- In office 5 November 1925 – 3 December 1937
- Preceded by: Richard Best
- Succeeded by: Edward Murphy

Member of Parliament for Belfast Cromac
- In office 1929–1937
- Preceded by: New constituency
- Succeeded by: Maynard Sinclair

Member of Parliament for South Belfast
- In office 1925–1929
- Preceded by: Philip James Woods
- Succeeded by: Constituency abolished

Personal details
- Born: Anthony Brutus Babington; 24 November 1877
- Died: 10 April 1972 (aged 94)
- Party: Ulster Unionist Party
- Education: Trinity College, Dublin

Sir Anthony Brutus Babington PC (NI) KC (24 November 1877 – 10 April 1972) was an Anglo-Irish barrister, judge and politician.

== Early life ==
Babington was born in 1877 to Hume Babington JP (son of The Rev. Hume Babington), a landowner of 1,540 acres, and Hester (née Watt; sister of Andrew Alexander Watt) at Creevagh House, County Londonderry.

He was educated at Glenalmond School, Perthshire and Trinity College, Dublin, where he won the Gold Medal for Oratory of the College Historical Society in 1899.

Babington was born into the Anglo-Irish Babington family that arrived in Ireland in 1610 when Brutus Babington was appointed Bishop of Derry. Notable relations include Robert Babington, William Babington, Benjamin Guy Babington and James Melville Babington and author Anthony Babington.

== Political and legal career ==
Babington was called to the Irish Bar in 1900. He briefly lectured in Equity at King's Inns, and it was during this time, in 1910, that he re-arranged and re-wrote R.E. Osborne's Jurisdiction and Practice of County Courts in Ireland in Equity and Probate Matters. He took silk in 1917.

He moved to the newly established Northern Ireland in 1921 and practised as a barrister until his election to the House of Commons of Northern Ireland as the Ulster Unionist Party member for South Belfast in 1925 and subsequent appointment as Attorney General for Northern Ireland the same year in the cabinet of Lord Craigavon. His appointment to the Privy Council of Northern Ireland in 1926 entitled him to the style "The Right Honourable". From 1929 Babington was the MP for Belfast, Cromac, the South Belfast constituency having been abolished. He was made an honorary bencher of the Middle Temple in 1930.

Babington resigned from politics in 1937 upon his appointment as a Lord Justice of Appeal and was knighted in the 1937 Coronation Honours.

In 1947, he chaired the Babington Agricultural Enquiry Committee, named in his honour, which was established in 1943 to examine agriculture in Northern Ireland. The committee's first recommendation under Babington's leadership was that Northern Ireland should direct all its energies to the production of livestock and livestock products and to their efficient processing and marketing.

Babington retired from the judiciary in 1949, taking up the chairmanship of the Northern Ireland Transport Tribunal, which existed until 1967, established under the Ulster Transport Act - promoting a car-centred transport policy - and which was largely responsible for the closure of the Belfast and County Down Railway. Babington endorsed the closure on financial grounds and was at cross purposes with his co-chair, Dr James Beddy, who advised against the closure, citing the disruption of life in the border region between the north and the south as his primary reason in addition to financial grounds.

Babington also chaired a government inquiry into the licensing of clubs, the proceeds of which resulted in new regulatory legislation at Stormont.

=== Renaming Northern Ireland as 'Ulster' ===
Babington, whilst Attorney-General, was a proponent of renaming Northern Ireland as "Ulster".

Babington was critical of the newly proposed Irish constitution, in which the name of the Irish state was changed to 'Ireland', laying claim to jurisdiction over Northern Ireland. He said:

I think that something should be done to make it quite clear that under no circumstances whatsoever could any such jurisdiction ever be exercised over us. I do not know how it is to be done but I shall make one suggestion and it is this: 'Our title has always been Northern Ireland. It was so under the Government of Ireland Act 1920, under which our Government was set up; and my suggestion is that it should be changed by law from 'Northern Ireland' to 'Ulster'.

Babington continued by saying that it was of "great importance" that the "cumbersome name" of Northern Ireland that came into the Act of 1920 alongside Southern Ireland should be changed. He continued further remarking that "The name of Southern Ireland has been changed and it was time that the name of Northern Ireland should be changed to Ulster".

=== View on Irish unity ===
Michael McDunphy, Secretary to the President of Ireland (then Douglas Hyde), recalled Ernest Alton's correspondence with Babington on the question of Irish unity, in which Alton and Babington were revealed to be at cross purposes. The discussion was used as an example by Brian Murphy, in Forgotten Patriot: Douglas Hyde and the Foundation of the Irish Presidency, as an example of the office of the Irish President becoming embroiled in an initiative involving Trinity College Dublin and a senior Northern Ireland legal figure, namely Babington.

Babington had written to Alton, then Provost of Trinity College, Dublin, expressing his view that, as Murphy summarises, "... Severance between the two parts of Ireland could not continue, that it was the duty of all Irishmen to work for early unification and that in his opinion Trinity College was a very appropriate place in which the first move should be made." When Alton arrived to meet with Hyde, it emerged, after conversing with Hyde's secretary McDunphy, that he and Babington were at cross purposes. "It soon became clear that the united Ireland contemplated by Mr [sic] Justice Babington of the Northern Ireland Judiciary was one within the framework of the British Commonwealth of Nations, involving recognition of the King of England as the Supreme Head, or as Dr Alton put it, the symbol of unity of the whole system," wrote McDunphy.

== Personal life ==
On 5 September 1907, he married Ethel Vaughan Hart, daughter of George Vaughan Hart KC LLD, of Howth, County Dublin (the son of Sir Andrew S. Hart) and his wife Mary Elizabeth Hone, a scion of the Hone family. They had three children:

- Mary Hume Babington (5 June 1908 – 24 February 2003), who married T.G. Wilson in 1928
- Emerson Hume Babington of Troy Hall, Derry (17 January 1910 – 1989), Crown Solicitor for the City and County of Londonderry
- Ruth Babington (24 October 1912 – 1999)

He was a member of the Apprentice Boys of Derry. From 1926 to 1952, he was a member of the board of governors of the Belfast Royal Academy. He served as warden (chairman) of the board from 1941 to 1943. Through his efforts the school acquired the Castle Grounds from Anthony Ashley-Cooper, 9th Earl of Shaftesbury in 1934.

Babington was a keen golfer. He was an international golfer from 1903 to 1913, during which he was runner-up in the Irish Amateur Golf Championships in 1909 and one of the Irish representatives at an international match in 1913. The Babington Room in the Royal Portrush Golf Club is named after him, as is the 18th hole on the course as a result of the key role he played in shaping its history.

== Publications ==
- Jurisdiction and Practice of County Courts in Ireland in Equity and Probate Matters (Dublin: E Ponsonby, 1910) [with R.E. Osborne]

Parliament of Northern Ireland
Preceded by Thomas Moles; Hugh Pollock; Arthur Black; Philip James Woods	Member of Parliament for Belfast South; 1925–1929; With: Thomas Moles; Hugh Pollock; Arthur Black	Constituency abolished
New constituency	Member of Parliament for Belfast, Cromac; 1929–1937	Succeeded by Maynard Sinclair
Political offices
Preceded by Richard Best	Attorney General for Northern Ireland; 1925–1937	Succeeded by Edward Sullivan Murphy
