= Antrim Borough (Northern Ireland Parliament constituency) =

Constituency of the Northern Ireland Parliament (1929–1973)

Coordinates: 54.671°N 6.226°W

Antrim
- Former County constituency for the Parliament of Northern Ireland
- Antrim shown within Northern Ireland

Former constituency
- Created: 1929
- Abolished: 1973
- Election method: First past the post

Antrim, sometimes known as Antrim Borough to distinguish it from the former constituency of the same name, was a single-member county constituency of the Parliament of Northern Ireland.

== Boundaries and boundary changes ==
The boundaries of Anrtim from 1929 to 1969

Antrim was a division of County Antrim. Before 1929 it was part of the seven-member Antrim constituency, with which it shared a name. The constituency sent one MP to the House of Commons of Northern Ireland from 1929 until the Parliament was temporarily suspended in 1972, and then formally abolished in 1973.

The division, from 1929 until 1969, adjoined Antrim Mid to the north, Antrim Bannside and Lough Neagh to the west, Antrim South to the south, Belfast to the south-east, Antrim Carrick to the east and Antrim Larne to the north-east.

In terms of the then local government areas the constituency in 1929 comprised parts of the rural districts of Antrim, Ballymena, Belfast and Lisburn.

After boundary changes in 1969, the constituency included parts of the rural districts of Antrim and Lisburn.

From 1969 to 1973, the division bordered Bannside to the north-west, Larne to the north-east, Carrick and Newtownabbey to the east, Belfast and Larkfield to the south-east, South Antrim to the south and Lough Neagh to the west.

== Politics ==
Antrim was only represented by two MPs, both members of the Ulster Unionist Party. They typically held a large majority and many elections were uncontested.

== Members of Parliament ==
| Year | Party | Name |
|---|---|---|
| 1929 | UUP | Hugh Minford |
| 1951 | UUP | Nat Minford |

== Election results ==
General Election 22 May 1929: Antrim, Antrim
| Party | Candidate | Votes | % | ±% |
|---|---|---|---|---|
| UUP | Hugh Minford | 6,869 | 63.41 | |
| Ind. Unionist | William Graham | 3,964 | 36.59 | |
| Majority | | 2,905 | 26.82 | |
| Turnout | | 17,937 | 60.39 | |
| UUP win (new seat) | | | | |

General Election 30 November 1933: Antrim, Antrim
| Party | Candidate | Votes | % | ±% |
|---|---|---|---|---|
| UUP | Hugh Minford | Unopposed | N/A | N/A |
| UUP hold | | Swing | N/A | |

General Election 9 February 1938: Antrim, Antrim
| Party | Candidate | Votes | % | ±% |
|---|---|---|---|---|
| UUP | Hugh Minford | 8,133 | 60.21 | N/A |
| Progressive Unionist | John Graham | 5,374 | 39.79 | New |
| Majority | | 2,759 | 20.42 | N/A |
| Turnout | | 20,687 | 65.29 | N/A |
| UUP hold | | Swing | N/A | |

General Election 14 June 1945: Antrim, Antrim
| Party | Candidate | Votes | % | ±% |
|---|---|---|---|---|
| UUP | Hugh Minford | Unopposed | N/A | N/A |
| UUP hold | | Swing | N/A | |

General Election 10 February 1949: Antrim, Antrim
| Party | Candidate | Votes | % | ±% |
|---|---|---|---|---|
| UUP | Hugh Minford | 11,580 | 83.05 | N/A |
| NI Labour | William John Gregg | 2,363 | 16.95 | New |
| Majority | | 9,217 | 66.10 | N/A |
| Turnout | | 20,165 | 69.14 | N/A |
| UUP hold | | Swing | N/A | |

- Death of Minford

Antrim Borough by-election, 1951
| Party | Candidate | Votes | % | ±% |
|---|---|---|---|---|
| UUP | Nat Minford | Unopposed | N/A | N/A |
| UUP hold | | Swing | N/A | |

General Election 22 October 1953: Antrim, Antrim
| Party | Candidate | Votes | % | ±% |
|---|---|---|---|---|
| UUP | Nat Minford | Unopposed | N/A | N/A |
| UUP hold | | Swing | N/A | |

General Election 20 March 1958: Antrim, Antrim
| Party | Candidate | Votes | % | ±% |
|---|---|---|---|---|
| UUP | Nat Minford | Unopposed | N/A | N/A |
| UUP hold | | Swing | N/A | |

General Election 31 May 1962: Antrim, Antrim
| Party | Candidate | Votes | % | ±% |
|---|---|---|---|---|
| UUP | Nat Owens Minford | Unopposed | N/A | N/A |
| UUP hold | | Swing | N/A | |

General Election 25 November 1965: Antrim, Antrim
| Party | Candidate | Votes | % | ±% |
|---|---|---|---|---|
| UUP | Nat Minford | 10,417 | 62.58 | N/A |
| National Democratic | John McGivern | 6,230 | 37.42 | New |
| Majority | | 4,187 | 25.16 | N/A |
| Turnout | | 29,580 | 56.28 | N/A |
| UUP hold | | Swing | N/A | |

- Boundary changes

General Election 24 February 1969: Antrim, Antrim
| Party | Candidate | Votes | % | ±% |
|---|---|---|---|---|
| UUP | Nat Minford | Unopposed | N/A | N/A |
| UUP hold | | Swing | N/A | |

- Parliament prorogued 30 March 1972 and abolished 18 July 1973
