= Belfast St Anne's =

Belfast St Anne's may refer to:

- Belfast St Anne's (Northern Ireland Parliament constituency)
- Belfast St Anne's (UK Parliament constituency)
