= Ulster Progressive Unionist Association =

Defunct unionist political group in Northern Ireland

- Leader: William Stewart
- Founded: 1938
- Dissolved: c.1945
- Ideology: Unionism; Social welfare
- Political position: Centre-right

The Ulster Progressive Unionist Association or, as it became within two months of its formation in June 1937, the Ulster Progressive Unionist Party (UPUP), was a political group formed to seek greater internal debate within unionism and to secure action on unemployment.

The founder of the group was William Stewart, the Ulster Unionist Party United Kingdom Member of Parliament for Belfast South between 1929 and 1945. He continued to take the Conservative and Unionist whip at Westminster, even though Progressive Unionist candidates opposed Ulster Unionist ones in the 1938 Northern Ireland general election (taking an average of 30% of the vote in the and the 10 seats contested) and in 1943 Antrim by-election.

The Association provided the main opposition in the 1938 general election, as the Nationalist Party decided to boycott in some areas, and the Northern Ireland Labour Party was only able to contest five seats. It represented a former section of the Ulster Unionist Party which opposed the official economic policy; in particular, the lack of urgency in dealing with unemployment and housing shortages. It proposed the maintenance of the union with the rest of the United Kingdom, the equalisation of taxation with the rest of the UK (which would have increased government revenues), and the use of this to tackle unemployment and provide housing with cheap rents. It also proposed to adopt the programme of the Ulster Farmers Union.

While it soon became apparent that the Association would not win a significant number of seats, it was widely believed that Stewart would either win or come very close in Belfast Cromac, against the young official candidate Maynard Sinclair. However, Sinclair won comparatively easily, with a majority of 29% of the total of votes cast. The closest contest came in East Down, where W. J. Price came within 1,000 votes of taking a seat, but even there, where the Nationalists were not contesting, the UPUA was unable to attract tactical votes from nationalists.

== Progressive Unionist candidates ==
1938 Northern Ireland general election

1. Phoebe Moody Belfast Bloomfield 3,988 (29.7%)
2. William John Stewart Belfast Cromac 4,337 (35.5%)
3. Robert Bradford Belfast Oldpark 1,253 (8.6%)
4. John Dilworth Wallace Belfast St Anne's 5,172 (31.6%)
5. Joseph McMaster Belfast Victoria 3,434 (24.5%)
6. Reginald Hanson Press Belfast Windsor 4,429 (33.0%)
7. John Graham Antrim, Antrim 5,374 (39.8%)
8. Andrew Beggs Antrim Mid 4,514 (32.5%)
9. Robert Nathaniel Boyd Antrim North 4,477 (35.3%)
10. William John Price Down East 4,050 (44.8%)
- Total: 42,425 votes (12.9% of the Northern Ireland vote in the 31 contested seats) - finished second in terms of votes but won no seats

United Kingdom by-election 11 February 1943

- Reginald Hanson Press Antrim 1,432 (2.3%)

== Bibliography ==
- Who's Who of British Members of Parliament, Vol. III 1919-1945, edited by M. Stenton and S. Lees (The Harvester Press 1979)
- British Parliamentary Election Results 1918-1949, compiled and edited by F.W.S. Craig (The Macmillan Press 1977)
- Northern Ireland Parliamentary Election Results 1921-1972, compiled and edited by Sydney Elliott (Political Reference Publications 1973)
