= Arthur Black (Unionist politician) =

Arthur Black PC(NI) KC (6 February 1888 – 15 April 1968) was an Irish barrister, judge and Ulster Unionist Party politician.

Born in Belfast, he was educated at Mountpottinger Elementary School and Campbell College, Belfast, and Sidney Sussex College, Cambridge. He was called to the English Bar in 1915 and was appointed as King's Counsel in 1929.

He was elected to the Northern Ireland House of Commons at the 1925 general election as a Member of Parliament (MP) for Belfast South. When constituencies were revised for the 1929 general election, he was elected as the MP for the new Belfast Willowfield constituency, and re-elected there in 1933 and 1938.

He held the seat until he was appointed to the judiciary in November 1941 as Recorder of Belfast and as a County Court judge. He served as Attorney General for Northern Ireland from 1939–1941, Recorder from 1941–43, Judge of the Northern Ireland Supreme Court from 1943–49 and as a Lord Justice of Appeal from 1949-64.

Parliament of Northern Ireland
Preceded by Thomas Moles; Hugh Pollock; Julia McMordie; Crawford McCullagh	Member of Parliament for South Belfast; 1925–1929; With: Thomas Moles 1925–1929; Hugh Pollock 1925–1929; Philip James Woods 1925; Anthony Babington 1925–1929	Constituency abolished
New constituency	Member of Parliament for Belfast, Willowfield; 1929–1941	Succeeded by Harry Midgley
Political offices
Preceded by Edward Sullivan Murphy	Attorney General for Northern Ireland; 1939–1941	Succeeded by John MacDermott
