= William Kennedy Gibson =

Irish footballer and political activist

Personal information
- Date of birth: 1 October 1876
- Place of birth: Glasgow, Scotland
- Date of death: 9 December 1949 (aged 73)
- Place of death: Belfast, Northern Ireland

Senior career*
Years	Team	Apps	(Gls)
1892–1903	Cliftonville		
1902	→ Sunderland (loan)	1	(0)
1902	→ Bishop Auckland (loan)		
1903	→ Sunderland Royal Rovers (loan)		

International career
1894–1902	Irish League XI	5	(0)
1894–1902	Ireland	13	(1)
- * Club domestic league appearances and goals

William Kennedy Gibson (1 October 1876 – 9 December 1949) was an Irish footballer and political activist.

== Football career ==
Although born in Glasgow, Gibson's family were from Belfast, and Gibson moved there at a young age. He was noted as a talented footballer who played for Cliftonville F.C. while still at school. He also spent time in the north-east of England and played with local teams on an amateur basis, including Sunderland, for whom he made one appearance in the Football League in the 1901–02 season when the club finished as English champions.

He played thirteen matches for the Ireland national team from 1894 to 1902, making his debut aged 17, scoring once (against England) and captaining the side on four occasions. He won numerous honours with Cliftonville, including the Irish Cup in 1897 and 1901, before becoming President of the club, then becoming active in its management.

== Political career ==
Outside football, Gibson worked as a solicitor, and he provided legal advice to the Irish Football Association, becoming its vice-chairman in 1907. In 1909, he was elected to the Belfast Corporation as an independent Unionist, with the support of the Belfast Citizens' Association. He defeated future Lord Mayor of Belfast William George Turner, who had the unofficial backing of the Conservative Party.

Gibson stood again as an independent Unionist in Belfast Ballynafeigh at the 1929 Northern Ireland general election, but he was narrowly defeated by Thomas Moles, the official Unionist candidate.
