= Robin Bailey (disambiguation) =

Robin Bailey (1919–1999) was an English actor.

Robin Bailey may also refer to:

- Robin Wayne Bailey (born 1952), American writer

== See also ==
- Robin Bailie (born 1937), Northern Irish solicitor and former politician
