= Belfast Cromac (Northern Ireland Parliament constituency) =

Constituency of the Parliament of Northern Ireland

Coordinates: 54.592°N 5.924°W

- Former Borough constituency for the Parliament of Northern Ireland
- Belfast shown within Northern Ireland

Former constituency
- Created: 1929
- Abolished: 1973
- Election method: First past the post

Belfast Cromac was a constituency of the Parliament of Northern Ireland.

== Boundaries ==
Belfast Cromac was a borough constituency comprising part of southern Belfast. It was created in 1929 when the House of Commons (Method of Voting and Redistribution of Seats) Act (Northern Ireland) 1929 introduced first past the post elections throughout Northern Ireland.

Belfast Cromac was created by the division of Belfast South into four new constituencies. It survived unchanged, returning one member of Parliament, until the Parliament of Northern Ireland was temporarily suspended in 1972, and then formally abolished in 1973.

== Politics ==
In common with other seats in south Belfast, the constituency was strongly unionist. It was always won by Unionist candidates, although labour movement and independent unionist candidates often contested it. All but its last MP died in office.

== Members of Parliament ==
Election	Member	Party
1929	Anthony Babington	Ulster Unionist Party
1938	Maynard Sinclair	Ulster Unionist Party
1953	Joseph William Morgan	Ulster Unionist Party
1962(b)	John William Kennedy	Ulster Unionist Party
1973	Constituency abolished	

== Election results ==
General Election 1929: Belfast Cromac
Party	Candidate	Votes	%	±%
UUP	Anthony Babington	6,680	61.1	
Ind. Unionist	James Reid	4,246	38.9	
Majority		2,434	22.2	
Turnout		10,926	64.6	
UUP win (new seat)				

At the 1933 Northern Ireland general election, Anthony Babington was elected unopposed.

General Election 1938: Belfast Cromac
Party	Candidate	Votes	%	±%
UUP	Maynard Sinclair	7,869	64.5	N/A
Progressive Unionist	William Stewart	4,337	35.5	New
Majority		3,532	29.0	N/A
Turnout		12,206	75.4	N/A
UUP hold		Swing	N/A	

General Election 1945: Belfast Cromac
Party	Candidate	Votes	%	±%
UUP	Maynard Sinclair	8,407	67.1	+2.6
Communist (NI)	Betty Sinclair	4,130	32.9	New
Majority		4,277	34.2	+5.2
Turnout		12,537	71.6	N/A
UUP hold		Swing		

General Election 1949: Belfast Cromac
Party	Candidate	Votes	%	±%
UUP	Maynard Sinclair	10,152	82.4	+15.3
Independent Labour	James A. Donnelly	2,170	17.6	New
Majority		7,982	64.8	+30.6
Turnout		12,322	74.3	+2.7
UUP hold		Swing		

General Election 1953: Belfast Cromac
Party	Candidate	Votes	%	±%
UUP	Joseph Morgan	5,293	67.0	−15.4
Ind. Unionist	Thomas Allen	2,170	17.6	New
Majority		3,123	49.4	−15.4
Turnout		7,463	48.6	−25.7
UUP hold		Swing		

At the 1958 Northern Ireland general election, William Morgan was elected unopposed.

General Election 1962: Belfast Cromac
Party	Candidate	Votes	%	±%
UUP	Joseph Morgan	5,863	64.5	N/A
NI Labour	Cecil Allen	3,225	35.5	New
Majority		2,638	29.0	N/A
Turnout		9,088	63.4	N/A
UUP hold		Swing	N/A	

Belfast Cromac by-election, 1962
Party	Candidate	Votes	%	±%
UUP	William Kennedy	4,801	62.0	−2.5
NI Labour	Cecil Allen	1,866	24.1	−11.4
Ulster Liberal	Robert Huston	1,074	13.9	New
Majority		2,935	37.9	+8.9
Turnout		7,741	54.0	−9.6
UUP hold		Swing		

General Election 1965: Belfast Cromac
Party	Candidate	Votes	%	±%
UUP	William Kennedy	5,126	71.8	+7.3
NI Labour	Jack Barkley	2,012	28.2	−7.3
Majority		3,114	43.6	+14.6
Turnout		7,138	50.2	−13.2
UUP hold		Swing		

General Election 1969: Belfast Cromac
Party	Candidate	Votes	%	±%
UUP	William Kennedy	6,320	77.0	+5.2
NI Labour	Jack Barkley	1,134	13.8	−14.4
People's Democracy	Edward Wiegleb	752	9.8	New
Majority		5,186	63.2	+19.6
Turnout		8,206	60.6	+10.4
UUP hold		Swing		
