= James Baird (trade unionist) =

James Baird (1871–1948) was a trade unionist and politician in Northern Ireland, born at Kilclay, near Augher, County Tyrone.

A Presbyterian and Rechabite, and an opponent of the partition of Ireland, Baird joined the Independent Labour Party. He was also active in the Boilermakers' Society, and was prominent in the Belfast strike, 1919. In 1920, he was elected to Belfast Corporation, representing the Belfast Labour Party.

Baird was expelled from the Harland and Wolff shipyard where he worked on account of his politics, alongside labour activists Sam Kyle, John Hanna and Charles McKay, and a substantial number of Roman Catholics. He stood for the Belfast Labour Party in Belfast South at the 1921 Northern Ireland general election. After working for the National Sailors' and Firemen's Union, Baird joined the ITGWU as an organizer, was active in the Waterford farm strike of 1923, and polled well as Labour candidate for Waterford in the general election of August 1923. In 1927, he with his family immigrated to Queensland, Australia and died in Brisbane in 1948. His eldest daughter Nora was a distinguished pianist and awarded an MBE in 1980 for her services to music in schools; and his youngest daughter Helene Jones was awarded the Medal of the Order of Australia for service to community music, particularly through the Rockhampton Chamber Music Society, choirs and arts organisations in 1996.

== Sources ==
- Emmet O'Connor, A Labour History of Ireland, 1824-2000 (Dublin, 2011).

Emmet O'Connor, Rotten Prod: The Unlikely Career of Dongaree Baird (UCD, 2022)
