= Belfast Oldpark (Northern Ireland Parliament constituency) =

Constituency of the Parliament of Northern Ireland

Coordinates: 54.616°N 5.953°W

- Former Borough constituency for the Parliament of Northern Ireland
- Belfast Oldpark shown within Belfast

Former constituency
- Created: 1929
- Abolished: 1973
- Election method: First past the post

Belfast Oldpark was a constituency of the Parliament of Northern Ireland.

== Boundaries ==
Belfast Oldpark was a borough constituency comprising part of northern Belfast. It was created in 1929 when the House of Commons (Method of Voting and Redistribution of Seats) Act (Northern Ireland) 1929 introduced first-past-the-post elections throughout Northern Ireland.

Belfast Oldpark was created by the division of Belfast North into four new constituencies. It survived unchanged, returning one member of Parliament, until the Parliament of Northern Ireland was temporarily suspended in 1972, and then formally abolished in 1973.

== Politics ==
In common with other seats in North Belfast, the seat had little nationalist presence. The seat alternated between Unionist and labour movement representatives, and was often closely contested.

== Members of Parliament ==
Election	Member	Party
1929	Wilson Hungerford	Ulster Unionist
1945	Robert Getgood	Labour (NI)
1949	William James Morgan	Ulster Unionist
1958	Vivian Simpson	Labour (NI)
1973	constituency abolished	

== Election results ==
General Election 1929: Belfast Oldpark
Party	Candidate	Votes	%	±%
UUP	Wilson Hungerford	6,122	50.8	
NI Labour	Sam Kyle	5,933	49.2	
Majority		189	1.6	
Turnout		12,055	77.0	
UUP win (new seat)				

General Election 1933: Belfast Oldpark
Party	Candidate	Votes	%	±%
UUP	Sir Wilson Hungerford	5,427	56.6	+5.8
Ind. Unionist	William McConnell Wilton	5,933	49.2	New
Majority		1,272	13.2	+11.6
Turnout		11,360	61.9	−15.1
UUP hold		Swing		

General Election 1938: Belfast Oldpark
Party	Candidate	Votes	%	±%
UUP	Sir Wilson Hungerford	7,310	50.5	−6.1
NI Labour	Jack MacGougan	5,900	40.8	New
Progressive Unionist	Robert Bradford	1,253	8.7	New
Majority		1,410	9.7	−3.5
Turnout		14,463	74.9	+13.0
UUP hold		Swing		

General Election 1945: Belfast Oldpark
Party	Candidate	Votes	%	±%
NI Labour	Robert Getgood	8,829	56.2	+15.4
UUP	Sir Wilson Hungerford	6,390	40.7	−9.8
Socialist Republican	David Wylie	481	3.1	New
Majority		2,439	15.5	+5.8
Turnout		15,700	74.7	−0.2
NI Labour gain from UUP		Swing		

General Election 1949: Belfast Oldpark
Party	Candidate	Votes	%	±%
UUP	William James Morgan	9,599	59.0	+18.3
NI Labour	Robert Getgood	6,661	41.0	−15.2
Majority		2,938	18.0	N/A
Turnout		16,260	78.6	+3.9
UUP gain from NI Labour		Swing		

General Election 1953: Belfast Oldpark
Party	Candidate	Votes	%	±%
UUP	William James Morgan	6,984	50.2	−8.8
NI Labour	Billy Blease	4,183	30.0	−11.0
Irish Labour	Cronan Francis Hughes	2,752	19.8	New
Majority		2,801	20.2	+2.2
Turnout		13,919	64.7	−13.9
UUP hold		Swing		

General Election 1958: Belfast Oldpark
Party	Candidate	Votes	%	±%
NI Labour	Vivian Simpson	6,307	50.6	+20.6
UUP	William James Morgan	6,152	49.4	−0.8
Majority		155	1.2	−19.0
Turnout		12,459	61.5	−3.2
NI Labour gain from UUP		Swing		

General Election 1962: Belfast Oldpark
Party	Candidate	Votes	%	±%
NI Labour	Vivian Simpson	8,486	62.5	+11.9
UUP	William Henry Cushley	5,082	37.5	−11.9
Majority		3,404	25.0	+23.8
Turnout		13,568	69.7	+8.2
NI Labour hold		Swing		

General Election 1965: Belfast Oldpark
Party	Candidate	Votes	%	±%
NI Labour	Vivian Simpson	6,210	59.5	−3.0
UUP	John Ferguson	4,221	40.5	+3.0
Majority		1,989	19.0	−6.0
Turnout		10,431	55.1	−14.6
NI Labour hold		Swing		

General Election 1969: Belfast Oldpark
Party	Candidate	Votes	%	±%
NI Labour	Vivian Simpson	6,779	56.5	−3.0
UUP	Joseph Foster Cairns	5,224	43.5	+3.0
Majority		1,555	13.0	−6.0
Turnout		12,003	67.4	+12.3
NI Labour hold		Swing		
