= Conolly Gage =

British politician and judge (1905–1984)

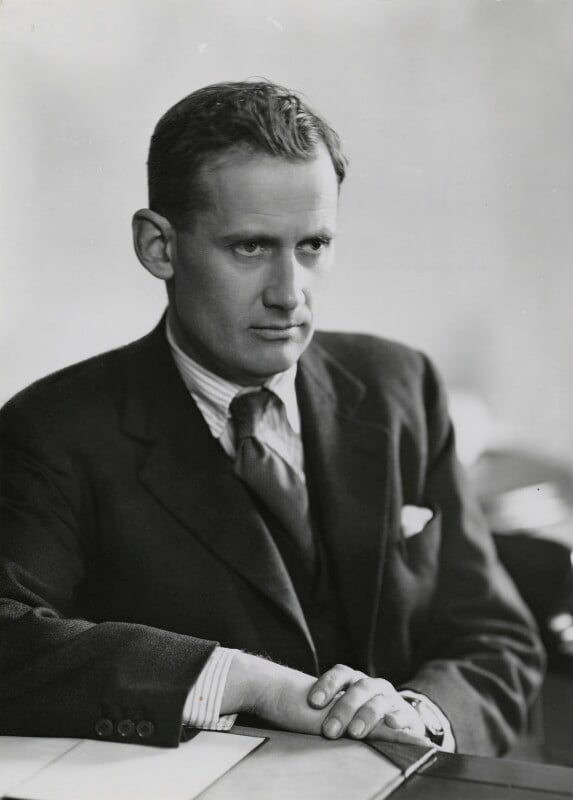
- Gage in 1948

Member of Parliament for Belfast South
- In office 26 July 1945 – 4 November 1952
- Preceded by: William Stewart
- Succeeded by: David Campbell

Personal details
- Born: 10 November 1905
- Died: 3 October 1984 (aged 78)
- Party: Ulster Unionist Party
- Spouse: Elinor Nancy Martyn
- Education: Cambridge University; Inner Temple
- Profession: Barrister, Judge

Conolly Hugh Gage (10 November 1905 – 3 October 1984) was a British politician and judge.

== Life ==
A nephew of Sir Denis Henry, Bt., Gage was educated at Repton School and Sidney Sussex College, Cambridge. He was called to the Bar from the Inner Temple in 1930, and built up a London practice. In 1932, he married Elinor Nancy Martyn.

In 1939, Gage joined the Royal Artillery as a gunner. With the First Canadian Army in the Second World War, he became lieutenant colonel and assistant judge advocate general.

He was elected as an Ulster Unionist Member of Parliament for Belfast South in 1945, resigning in 1952. He was also Recorder of Saffron Walden and Maldon from 1950 to 1952, a County Court judge from 1958 to 1971 and a circuit judge from 1972 to 1978.

His son, William Gage, was also a judge.

Parliament of the United Kingdom
Preceded by William Stewart	Member of Parliament for Belfast South; 1945–1952	Succeeded by David Campbell
