= Newtownabbey (Northern Ireland Parliament constituency) =

Constituency of the Northern Ireland Parliament (1969–1972)

Coordinates: 54.685°N 5.966°W

- Former County constituency for the Parliament of Northern Ireland
- Newtownabbey shown within Northern Ireland

Former constituency
- Created: 1969
- Abolished: 1973
- Election method: First past the post

Newtownabbey was a single-member county constituency of the Parliament of Northern Ireland.

== Boundaries and boundary changes ==
Before 1969, the area formed part of the Northern Ireland Parliament constituencies of Antrim Borough and Carrick.

Newtownabbey was created by the Electoral Law Act (Northern Ireland) 1968 as a division of County Antrim. It was located to the north of Belfast and comprised "part of the urban district of Newtownabbey which consists of the wards of Carnmoney, Cavehill, Glengormley, Whitehouse, and Whitewell".

The constituency sent one MP to the House of Commons of Northern Ireland from the 1969 Northern Ireland general election. The Parliament was prorogued on 30 March 1972, under the terms of the Northern Ireland (Temporary Provisions) Act 1972. It was formally abolished in 1973 when the Northern Ireland Constitution Act 1973 received Royal Assent on 18 July 1973.

The Parliamentary representative of the division was elected using the first-past-the-post system.

== Member of Parliament: House of Commons (Northern Ireland) ==
Election	Member	Party
1969	Robin John Bailie	Ulster Unionist
1973	constituency abolished	

== Election: House of Commons (Northern Ireland) ==
General Election 24 February 1969: Newtownabbey
Party	Candidate	Votes	%	±%
UUP	Robin John Bailie	9,852	74.29	
NI Labour	Jack McDowell	3,410	25.71	
Majority		6,442	48.58	
Turnout		22,151	59.87.32	
UUP win (new seat)				

- Parliament prorogued 30 March 1972 and abolished 18 July 1973
