= Belfast Windsor (Northern Ireland Parliament constituency) =

Constituency of the Parliament of Northern Ireland

Coordinates: 54.580°N 5.946°W

- Former Borough constituency for the Parliament of Northern Ireland
- Belfast Windsor shown within Belfast and Belfast shown within Northern Ireland

Former constituency
- Created: 1929
- Abolished: 1973
- Election method: First past the post

Belfast Windsor was a constituency of the Parliament of Northern Ireland.

== Boundaries ==
Belfast Windsor was a borough constituency comprising part of southern Belfast. It was created in 1929 when the House of Commons (Method of Voting and Redistribution of Seats) Act (Northern Ireland) 1929 introduced first past the post elections throughout Northern Ireland.

Belfast Windsor was created by the division of Belfast South into four new constituencies. It survived unchanged, returning one member of Parliament, until the Parliament of Northern Ireland was temporarily suspended in 1972, and then formally abolished in 1973.

== Politics ==
In common with other seats in south Belfast, the constituency was strongly unionist. The seat was always held by official Unionist candidates, and the rare contests came only from other Unionists.

== Members of Parliament ==
Election	Member	Party
1929	Hugh Pollock	Ulster Unionist Party
1937(b)	William Dowling	Ulster Unionist Party
1945	Archibald Wilson	Ulster Unionist Party
1956(b)	Herbert Kirk	Ulster Unionist Party
1973	Constituency abolished	

== Election results ==
General Election 22 May 1929: Belfast Windsor
Party	Candidate	Votes	%	±%
UUP	Hugh Pollock	8,067	73.7	
Town Tenants' Association	William Magill	2,886	26.3	
Majority		5,181	47.4	
Turnout		10,953	67.0	
UUP win (new seat)				

At the General Election 30 November 1933, Hugh Pollock was elected unopposed. At the 1937 Belfast Windsor by-election, William Dowling was elected unopposed.

General Election 9 February 1938: Belfast Windsor
Party	Candidate	Votes	%	±%
UUP	William Dowling (politician)	8,982	67.0	N/A
Progressive Unionist	Reginald Hanson Press	4,429	33.0	New
Majority		4,553	34.0	N/A
Turnout		13,411	70.9	N/A
UUP hold		Swing	N/A	

General Election 14 June 1945: Belfast Windsor
Party	Candidate	Votes	%	±%
UUP	Archibald Wilson	8,737	63.7	−3.3
Commonwealth Labour	James Kennedy	4,985	36.3	New
Majority		3,752	27.4	−6.6
Turnout		13,722	67.0	−3.9
UUP hold		Swing		

At the 1949 and 1953 Northern Ireland general elections, Archibald Wilson was elected unopposed.

At the 1956 Belfast Windsor by-election and the 1958, 1962, 1965 and 1969 Northern Ireland general elections, Herbert Kirk was elected unopposed.
