= Jim Bailie =

Ulster Unionist Party politician (fl. 1940s–70s)

James Orr Bailie, known as Jim Bailie, was a prominent unionist activist in Northern Ireland.

Bailie trained as a Conservative Party election agent before joining the staff of the Ulster Unionist Party, in 1942. He was appointed as the party's organiser in 1946, and in particular worked on developing the Young Unionist movement, and the new party constitution of 1946.

Bailie was appointed Assistant Secretary of the Ulster Unionist Council (UUC) in 1961, then became Secretary in 1963. Working alongside new Prime Minister of Northern Ireland Terence O'Neill, he had less influence than his predecessors, although he continued to act as Secretary to the Whip's Office. He reorganised the staff at the party headquarters, but had limited control of unionist clubs around Northern Ireland. In 1971 he was awarded an O.B.E. "for political services in North Ireland."

Party political offices
Preceded by Billy Douglas	Secretary of the Ulster Unionist Council; 1963–1974	Succeeded by Norman Hutton
