= George Ruddell Black =

Politician in Northern Ireland

George Ruddell Black (1865 or 1866–1942) was a unionist politician in Northern Ireland.

Black worked as a clothing manufacturer and was elected as an Ulster Unionist Party member of the Belfast Corporation. In 1942, he was elected as the Lord Mayor of Belfast, but he died after a few months in office.

Civic offices
Preceded by James Dunlop Williamson	High Sheriff of Belfast; 1935–1936	Succeeded by Thomas McConnell
Preceded by Crawford McCullagh	Lord Mayor of Belfast; 1942	Succeeded by Crawford McCullagh
