= Julia McMordie =

Northern Irish politician (1860–1942)

Julia McMordie

Julia Gray McMordie CBE JP (30 March 1860 – 12 April 1942) was an English-born Ulster Unionist Party politician in Northern Ireland. She was made Commander of the Order of the British Empire (CBE) for her role as President of St John Voluntary Aid Detachment in Belfast during World War I. In 1922 she was one of only two women elected to the Parliament of Northern Ireland, representing South Belfast. She became the first female High Sheriff of Belfast in 1928.

== Early life and family ==
McMordie was born on 30 March 1860 in Hartlepool, County Durham, England, the daughter of shipbuilder Sir William Gray and Dorothy Gray (née Hall). Her father, who owned William Gray & Company, was elected mayor of Hartlepool in 1861 and 1862, and was the first mayor of West Hartlepool in 1887. He was knighted in 1890.

A Presbyterian, she was educated at Chislehurst, Kent. On 8 April 1885, she married prominent Belfast barrister R. J. McMordie; the couple made their home at Cabin Hill, Knock, Belfast. Her brother was created a baronet in 1917 as Sir William Cresswell Gray, 1st Baronet of Tunstall Manor, Hartlepool.

== Career ==
During the First World War, she was President of the St John Voluntary Aid Detachments in Belfast. She was appointed a Member of the Order of the British Empire (MBE) in the 1918 New Year Honours, and upgraded to a Commander (CBE) in the 1919 New Year Honours.

In 1921, McMordie was one of two women elected to the first Parliament of Northern Ireland, she represented South Belfast. She did not stand for re-election in 1925. She became the first female High Sheriff of Belfast in 1928.

== Later life and death ==
After she was widowed in 1925, she moved to East Cliff, Budleigh Salterton, Devon, in order to be near her son, John Andrew, and daughter, Elsie Gray.

She died aged 82, on 12 April 1942, at her daughter's home in King's Cliffe, Northamptonshire.

Parliament of Northern Ireland
New constituency	Member of Parliament for Belfast South; 1921–1925; With: Hugh Pollock; Thomas Moles; Crawford McCullagh	Succeeded by Thomas Moles; Hugh Pollock; Arthur Black; Philip James Woods
Civic offices
Preceded by Samuel Cheyne	High Sheriff of Belfast; 1928–1929	Succeeded by Samuel Hall-Thompson
