= Lagan Valley (Northern Ireland Parliament constituency) =

Constituency of the Northern Ireland Parliament (1969–1972)

Coordinates: 54.506°N 6.044°W

- Former County constituency for the Parliament of Northern Ireland

Former constituency
- Created: 1969
- Abolished: 1973
- Election method: First past the post

Lagan Valley was a single-member county constituency of the Parliament of Northern Ireland.

== Boundaries and Boundary Changes ==
Before 1969, the area formed part of the Northern Ireland Parliament constituencies of Mid Down and Iveagh.

Lagan Valley was created by the Electoral Law Act (Northern Ireland) 1968 as a division of County Down. It was located to the south of Belfast. The seat included Hillsborough, Drumbo and Carryduff as well as the sprawling rural area of Ballymacbrennan, which are split between the Lagan Valley and Belfast South and Mid Down constituencies.

The constituency sent one MP to the House of Commons of Northern Ireland at the 1969 Northern Ireland general election. The Parliament was prorogued on 30 March 1972, under the terms of the Northern Ireland (Temporary Provisions) Act 1972. It was formally abolished in 1973 when the Northern Ireland Constitution Act 1973 received Royal Assent on 18 July 1973.

The Parliamentary representative of the division was elected using the first-past-the-post system.

== Member of Parliament ==
Year	Member	Party
1969	Robert Porter	UUP
1972	Robert Porter	Alliance

Porter joined the Alliance Party in June 1972, the Parliament having been suspended in March. As a result, he never sat as an Alliance member in the Northern Ireland House of Commons.

== Election result ==
General Election 24 February 1969: Lagan Valley
Party	Candidate	Votes	%	±%
UUP	Robert Porter	Unopposed	N/A	N/A
UUP gain from new seat		Swing	N/A	

- Parliament prorogued 30 March 1972 and abolished 18 July 1973
