= Crawford McCullagh =

British politician

Sir Crawford McCullagh, as Lord Mayor

The Rt Hon. Sir Crawford McCullagh, 1st Baronet (1868 (Aghalee, Co. Antrim) – 13 April 1948), was a Unionist politician in Northern Ireland.

McCullagh started his career as an apprentice at the age of 14 in the drapery trade. He then became the director of several businesses in Belfast, including Maguire and Patterson, a dry goods firm (Vespa matches), and the Classic Cinema at Castle Place, as well as owning McCullagh and Co., a silk mercers, milliners and fancy drapery store taken over by Styles and Mantles in 1927.

He was elected to Belfast Corporation for the Irish Unionist Party. In 1911, he was the High Sheriff of Belfast, and from 1914 to 1917 Lord Mayor of Belfast.

McCullagh was not the pioneer of the 'Two Minutes Silence', as Newtownabbey author Bob Armstrong claimed in his publication Through The Ages To Newtownabbey. According to The Belfast Telegraph at the time Sir Crawford called for a 'Five Minutes Silence' on 11 July 1916, following receiving news of the death of thousands of soldiers from the 36th (Ulster) Division at the Somme. However, significantly, he was the first recorded person to publicly call for a period of silence for fallen soldiers.

McCullagh was knighted on 19 May 1915, and created a baronet on 1 July 1935. At the 1921 Northern Ireland general election, he was elected for Belfast South for the Ulster Unionist Party. He lost his seat at the 1925 general election, when he took only 4% of the first preference votes.

From 1931 until 1942, McCullagh was again Lord Mayor of Belfast, which now entitled him to a seat in the Senate of Northern Ireland. He was Deputy Speaker from 1939 to 1941. In 1938 he negotiated with Lord Shaftesbury a donation to the city of Belfast Castle and its demesne of 200 acres (0.81 km^{2}) bordering on Hazelwood and Bellevue pleasure grounds. He also opened the Floral Hall. In 1941, he was appointed to the Privy Council of Northern Ireland. From 1943 until 1946, he served a final term as Lord Mayor.

Sir Crawford's elegant mansion, Lismarra, at Whitehouse, north of Belfast, was designed by Sir Charles Lanyon, It was later renamed Abbeydene following his death. It is currently being utilised as an exclusive guest house. He was married twice, first in 1890 to Minnie McCully and then in 1897 to Margaret Brodie.

McCullagh's son, Sir Joseph Crawford McCullagh (2nd Baronet of Lismara) (1907–1974), was probably the foremost authority on ornithology in Northern Ireland in the years preceding his death. He was Patron of the Northern Ireland Ornithologists' Club. He later built a house adjacent to his family home in the townland of White Abbey and took the 'Lismarra' name. The house still remains today.

McCullagh also had two daughters, Helen and Daisy. His great-granddaughter Susan Cunningham has published his biography called Sir Crawford McCullagh - Belfast’s Dick Whittington.

Parliament of Northern Ireland
New constituency	Member of Parliament for Belfast South; 1921–1929; With: Thomas Moles; Hugh Pollock; Julia McMordie	Succeeded by Thomas Moles; Hugh Pollock; Arthur Black; Philip James Woods
Civic offices
Preceded by George Doran	High Sheriff of Belfast; 1911–1912	Succeeded by James Johnston
Preceded by R. J. McMordie	Lord Mayor of Belfast; 1915–1917	Succeeded by James Johnston
Preceded by William Frederick Coates	Lord Mayor of Belfast; 1931–1942	Succeeded by George Ruddell Black
Preceded by George Ruddell Black	Lord Mayor of Belfast; 1943–1946	Succeeded by William Neill
Baronetage of the United Kingdom
New creation	Baronet (of Lismarra); 1935–1948	Succeeded by Joseph McCullagh
