= James Johnston (Northern Ireland politician) =

The Right Honourable Sir James Johnston
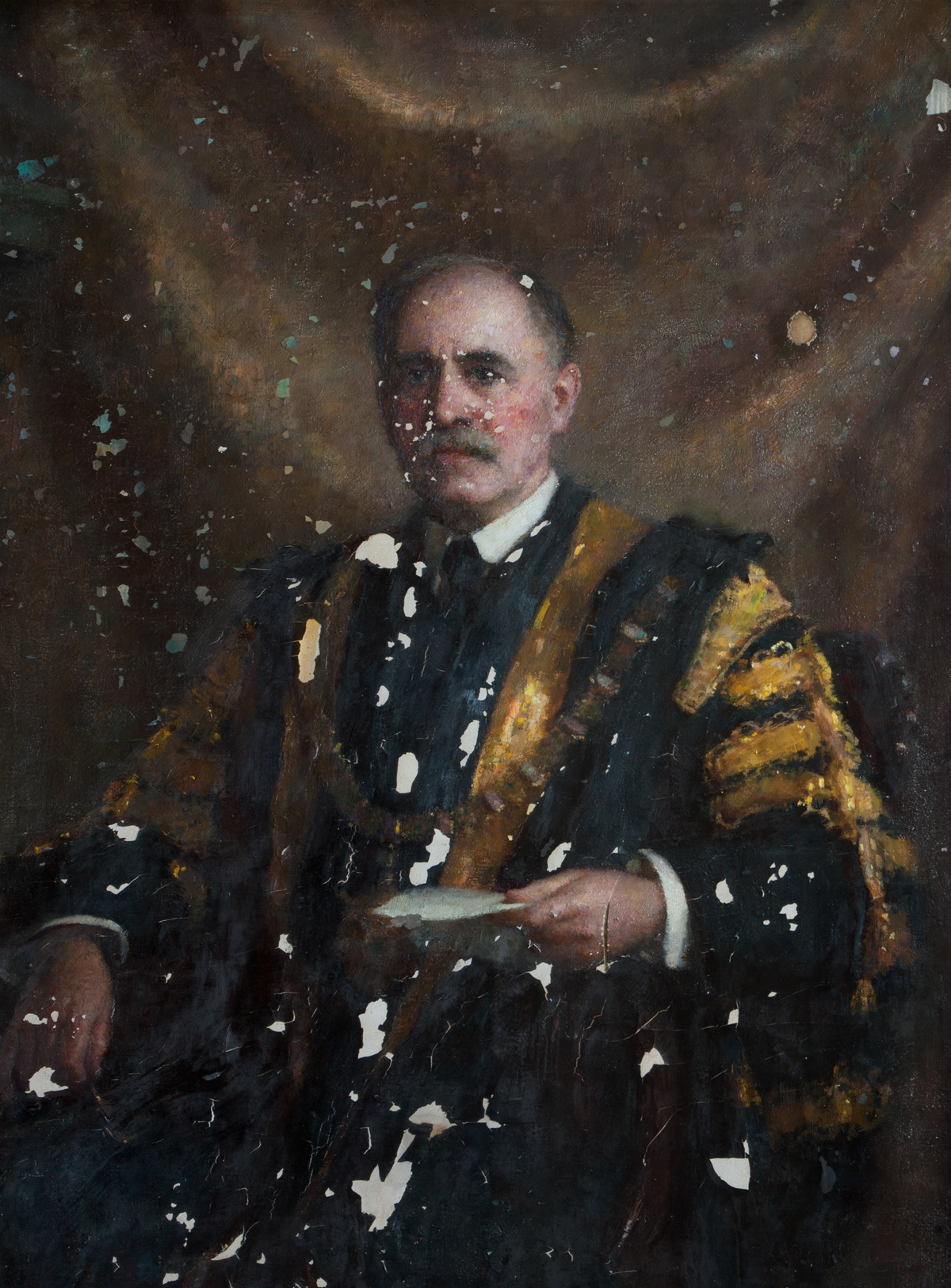

Lord Mayor of Belfast
- In office 1917–1919
- Preceded by: Sir Crawford McCullagh
- Succeeded by: John Campbell White

High Sheriff of Belfast
- In office 1912–1913
- Preceded by: Crawford McCullagh
- Succeeded by: Frank Workman

Personal details
- Born: James Johnston; 29 November 1849 Crossgar
- Died: 29 November 1924 (aged 75)
- Party: unionist
- Spouse: Jane Cleland (m. 1876)
- Children: 2, Sir William Ernest George Johnston, Maud

Sir James Johnston, PC (29 November 1849 – 13 April 1924) was a unionist politician in Ireland.

Johnston was a company director and was elected to the Belfast Corporation for the Irish Unionist Party. He was High Sheriff of Belfast in 1912/3, and Lord Mayor of Belfast from 1917 to 1919. In 1921, he was elected to the Senate of Northern Ireland, but served only three years. He was a Deputy Speaker of the Senate from 1921 until 1923.

Civic offices
Preceded by Crawford McCullagh	High Sheriff of Belfast; 1912–1913	Succeeded by Frank Workman
Preceded by Crawford McCullagh	Lord Mayor of Belfast; 1917–1919	Succeeded by John Campbell White
