= Belfast St Anne's (UK Parliament constituency) =

Parliamentary constituency in the United Kingdom, 1918–1922

- Former borough constituency for the House of Commons

1918–1922
- Seats: 1
- Created from: Belfast West
- Replaced by: Belfast West

St Anne's, a division of Belfast, was a UK parliamentary constituency in Ireland. It returned one Member of Parliament (MP) to the House of Commons of the United Kingdom from 1918 to 1922, using the first past the post electoral system.

== Boundaries and boundary changes ==
The constituency was created by the Redistribution of Seats (Ireland) Act 1918 from an area which had been in the Belfast West constituency. It the southern third of West Belfast, and contained the St Anne's and St George's wards of Belfast City Council. The streets in St Anne's ward in 1911 are listed here and here, and the streets in St George's ward in 1911 are listed here. Between them, those wards contained the area between the Falls Road and the railway to Lisburn.

It was in use at the 1918 general election only, and under the Government of Ireland Act 1920 its area was again part of the Belfast West constituency, with effect at the 1922 general election.

== Politics ==
The constituency was strongly unionist. The unionists ran a candidate from the Ulster Unionist Labour Association, a group affiliated with the Unionist Party, as a Labour Unionist. He easily won the seat. An Independent Unionist candidate was in second place. Sinn Féin was third with eleven per cent of the vote.

== First Dáil ==
After the 1918 election, Sinn Féin invited all those elected for constituencies in Ireland to sit as TDs in Dáil Éireann rather than in the House of Commons of the United Kingdom. All those elected for Irish constituencies were included in the roll of the Dáil but only those elected for Sinn Féin sat in the First Dáil. In May 1921, the Dáil passed a resolution declaring that elections to the House of Commons of Northern Ireland and the House of Commons of Southern Ireland would be used as the election for the Second Dáil and that the First Dáil would be dissolved on the assembly of the new body. The area of Belfast St Anne's would then have been represented in the Dáil by the four-seat constituency of Belfast West, which also returned no representatives for Sinn Féin.

== Members of Parliament ==
Election	Member	Party
1918	Thomas Henry Burn	Labour Unionist
1922	Thomas Henry Burn	constituency abolished

== Election ==
1918 general election: Belfast St Anne's
Party	Candidate	Votes	%	±%
Labour Unionist	Thomas Henry Burn	9,155	74.8	
Ind. Unionist	William Hugh Alexander	1,752	14.2	
Sinn Féin	Dermot Barnes	1,341	11.0	
Majority		7,403	60.6	
Turnout		12,248	65.5	
Labour Unionist win (new seat)				

== See also ==
- List of United Kingdom Parliament constituencies in Ireland and Northern Ireland
- List of MPs elected in the 1918 United Kingdom general election
- Historic Dáil constituencies
