= McCullagh baronets =

Extinct baronetcy in the Baronetage of the United Kingdom

The McCullagh Baronetcy, of Lismarra in the Parish of Carnmoney in the County of Antrim, was a title in the Baronetage of the United Kingdom. It was created on 1 July 1935 for the Northern Ireland businessman and politician Sir Crawford McCullagh. The title became extinct on the death of the second Baronet in 1974.

== McCullagh Baronets, of Lismarra (1935) ==
- Sir Crawford McCullagh, 1st Baronet (1868–1948)
- Sir Joseph Crawford McCullagh, 2nd Baronet (1907–1974)

== Arms ==
Coat of arms of McCullagh baronets

Notes
Granted by Sir Nevile Rodwell Wilkinson, 9th July 1935.
Crest
A cubit arm erect vested Gules the hand holding a scroll therefrom a seal pendant Proper wreathed Gules doubled Argent.
Escutcheon
Per fess crenellé Argent and Gules over all a pile Ermines charged with a fret Or.
Motto
Vigilano
