= Billy Douglas (politician) =

William Douglas was a prominent unionist activist in Northern Ireland.

Douglas served in the British Army during World War I, under Herbert Dixon. When Dixon was elected for Belfast Pottinger at the 1918 general election, he appointed Douglas as his secretary. On the establishment of the Parliament of Northern Ireland, Dixon became the first Unionist Chief Whip, and he arranged Douglas's appointment as Superintendent of the Whips Office. Douglas used the post to liaise between the whips office and Unionist Party Headquarters.

While Wilson Hungerford was serving as Secretary of the Ulster Unionist Council (UUC), he devoted little time to the post, allowing Douglas to take a leading role in the organisation, working alongside James Craig, Dixon and Dawson Bates to make policy and decide tactics. In 1941, he finally became Secretary to the UUC, where he focussed on maximising the Unionist Party vote, using every possible method. He resigned from the post in 1963, and was succeeded by his assistant, James O. Bailie.

Party political offices
Preceded by Wilson Hungerford	Secretary of the Ulster Unionist Council; 1941–1963	Succeeded by Jim Bailie
