= Adelaide Cleaver =

- Born: Adelaide Franklin Pollock; 1885
- Died: 14 August 1939 (aged 53–54)
- Known for: First woman to fly across the United States
- Spouse: Arthur Spencer Cleaver

Adelaide Franklin Cleaver (née Pollock; 1885 – 14 August 1939) was an Irish aviator from Northern Ireland.

== Life and flying ==
She was the daughter of Northern Ireland's first Minister of Finance, Hugh MacDowell Pollock. Her husband was Lieutenant-Colonel Arthur Spencer Cleaver.

In 1929 she spent 3 months flying to India and back in her de Havilland Gypsy Moth G-AAEA named Will o' the Wisp. She was piloted by Captain Donald Drew of Imperial Airways, and arrived back at Croydon Airport on 10 June.

In July 1933 she was responsible for a flying display which was held at Aldergrove Aerodrome, Co. Antrim with the intention of stimulating air-mindedness in Ulster. In 1934, Mary de Bunsen wrote that "Mrs Spencer Cleaver makes the usually fatiguing journey to Northern Ireland three or four times a year in her own aeroplane, and, fitted with extra tanks to save refuelling during the day, it has many times enabled her to breakfast in London, shop in Paris from 11 to 1, and return in plenty of time for dinner at her house in London."

== Equipment ==
An immense lover of flying, Cleaver owned several aircraft:

- a 1929 de Havilland Gipsy Moth G-AAEA, Willo the Wisp, which she sold to Venetia Montagu;
- a 1930 de Havilland Gipsy Moth G-AAVY Will o' the Wisp II, which she sold to Lady Howard de Walden;
- a 1930 De Havilland Puss Moth, G-ABFV
- a 1933 Percival D.2 Gull Four IID, G-ACIP
