= Belfast Ballynafeigh (Northern Ireland Parliament constituency) =

Constituency of the Parliament of Northern Ireland

Coordinates: 54.578°N 5.922°W

- Former Borough constituency for the Parliament of Northern Ireland
- Belfast Ballynafeigh shown within Belfast and Belfast shown within Northern Ireland

Former constituency
- Created: 1929
- Abolished: 1973
- Election method: First past the post

Belfast Ballynafeigh was a constituency of the Parliament of Northern Ireland.

== Boundaries ==
Belfast Ballynafeigh was a borough constituency comprising part of southern Belfast. It was created in 1929 when the House of Commons (Method of Voting and Redistribution of Seats) Act (Northern Ireland) 1929 introduced first past the post elections throughout Northern Ireland.

Belfast Ballynafeigh was created by the division of Belfast South into four new constituencies. It survived unchanged, returning one member of Parliament, until the Parliament of Northern Ireland was temporarily suspended in 1972, and then formally abolished in 1973.

== Politics ==
In common with other seats in south Belfast, the constituency was strongly unionist. It was consistently won by Ulster Unionist Party candidates, although independent Unionist and labour candidates also stood.

== Members of Parliament ==
Election	Member	Party
1929	Thomas Moles	Ulster Unionist Party
1933	Thomas Moles	Ulster Unionist Party
1937	Frederick Thompson	Ulster Unionist Party
1945	Frederick Thompson	Ulster Unionist Party
1949	Ivan Neill	Ulster Unionist Party
1950	Ivan Neill	Ulster Unionist Party
1953	Ivan Neill	Ulster Unionist Party
1958	Ivan Neill	Ulster Unionist Party
1962	Ivan Neill	Ulster Unionist Party
1965	Ivan Neill	Ulster Unionist Party
1969	Ivan Neill	Ulster Unionist Party
1973	Constituency abolished	

== Election results ==
General Election 22 May 1929: Belfast Ballynafeigh
Party	Candidate	Votes	%	±%
UUP	Thomas Moles	5,152	59.4	
Ind. Unionist	William Kennedy Gibson	3,525	40.6	
Majority		1,627	18.8	
Turnout		8,677		
UUP win (new seat)				

General Election 30 November 1933: Belfast Ballynafeigh
Party	Candidate	Votes	%	±%
UUP	Thomas Moles	Unopposed	N/A	N/A
UUP hold		Swing	N/A	

- Death of Moles

1937 Belfast Ballynafeigh By-election: Belfast Ballynafeigh, 2 April 1937
Party	Candidate	Votes	%	±%
UUP	Frederick Thompson (Northern Irish politician)	Unopposed	N/A	N/A
UUP hold		Swing	N/A	

General Election 9 February 1938: Belfast Ballynafeigh
Party	Candidate	Votes	%	±%
UUP	Frederick Thompson (Northern Irish politician)	7,221	70.4	N/A
Independent	William McMillan	3,037	29.6	New
Majority		4,184	40.8	N/A
Turnout		10,258		
UUP hold		Swing	N/A	

General Election 14 June 1945: Belfast Ballynafeigh
Party	Candidate	Votes	%	±%
UUP	Frederick Thompson (Northern Irish politician)	5,775	48.5	−21.9
Commonwealth Labour	William Kennedy	3,715	31.2	New
NI Labour	John Roney Baine	2,424	20.3	New
Majority		2,060	17.3	−23.5
Turnout		21,069	45.78	
UUP hold		Swing		

General Election 10 February 1949: Belfast Ballynafeigh
Party	Candidate	Votes	%	±%
UUP	Ivan Neill	Unopposed	N/A	N/A
UUP hold		Swing	N/A	

General Election 22 October 1953: Belfast Ballynafeigh
Party	Candidate	Votes	%	±%
UUP	Ivan Neill	5,495	67.2	N/A
Ind. Unionist	Victor Scott McVea	2,682	32.8	New
Majority		2,813	34.4	N/A
Turnout		8,177		
UUP hold		Swing	N/A	

General Election 20 March 1958: Belfast Ballynafeigh
Party	Candidate	Votes	%	±%
UUP	Ivan Neill	5,273	61.4	−5.8
Ind. Unionist	Victor Scott McVea	3,320	38.6	+5.8
Majority		1,953	22.8	−11.6
Turnout		8,593		
UUP hold		Swing		

General Election 31 May 1962: Belfast Ballynafeigh
Party	Candidate	Votes	%	±%
UUP	Ivan Neill	5,474	57.8	−3.6
NI Labour	F. D. Hazard	2,736	28.9	New
Ulster Liberal	Judith Rosenfield	1,255	13.3	New
Majority		2,738	28.9	+6.1
Turnout		9,465		
UUP hold		Swing		

General Election 25 November 1965: Belfast Ballynafeigh
Party	Candidate	Votes	%	±%
UUP	Ivan Neill	5,010	65.6	+7.8
NI Labour	Erskine Holmes	2,624	34.4	+5.5
Majority		2,386	31.2	+2.3
Turnout		7,634		
UUP hold		Swing		

General Election 24 February 1969: Belfast Ballynafeigh
Party	Candidate	Votes	%	±%
UUP	Ivan Neill	6,523	70.9	+5.3
NI Labour	Erskine Holmes	2,675	29.1	−5.3
Majority		3,848	41.8	+10.6
Turnout		9,198		
UUP hold		Swing		

== See also ==
- Ballynafeigh ward
