= Electoral Law Act (Northern Ireland) 1968 =

Legislation ending plural voting in Northern Ireland

Electoral Law Act (Northern Ireland) 1968 (Note: Section 9(1).)
- Act of Parliament
- Parliament of Northern Ireland
- Long title: An Act to abolish the university constituency for the purposes of elections to the Parliament of Northern Ireland; to create four new constituencies and alter the areas of other constituencies; to abolish the occupation of business premises as a qualification for electors at such elections; to enable the age at which persons qualify to be registered as parliamentary electors to be altered; to establish a permanent Boundary Commission and to provide for the review of the distribution of seats at such elections; and for purposes connected with the matters aforesaid or any of them.
- Citation: 1968 c. 20 (N.I.)
- Territorial extent: Northern Ireland

Dates
- Royal assent: 28 November 1968
Other legislation
Amends	Electoral Law Act (Northern Ireland) 1962
Amended by	Statute Law Revision (Northern Ireland) Act 1980

Text of statute as originally enacted

Revised text of statute as amended

The Electoral Law Act (Northern Ireland) 1968 (1968. c. 20 (N.I.)) was an act of the Parliament of Northern Ireland which amended the electoral law for elections to the House of Commons of Northern Ireland through the abolition of plural voting and the establishment of a permanent boundary commission to redraw constituencies.

== Background ==
The House of Commons had 52 seats. The House of Commons (Method of Voting and Redistribution of Seats) Act (Northern Ireland) 1929 had created 48 territorial constituencies in Northern Ireland, each electing one member of parliament (MP) by first past the post. The remaining seats were elected by single transferable vote from a four-seat Queen's University of Belfast.

The Queen's University of Belfast constituency in the House of Commons of the United Kingdom had been abolished under the Representation of the People Act 1948, which took effect at the 1950 United Kingdom general election.

The Representation of the People Act 1969 abolished plural voting in relation to the House of Commons of the United Kingdom for owners of business premises.

== Provisions ==
Under the 1968 act, the Queen's University of Belfast constituency was abolished, and four new constituencies were created, two in County Antrim (Larkfield and Newtownabbey) and two in County Down (Bangor and Lagan Valley). Neighbouring constituencies were redrawn.

The 1968 act also abolished plural voting for owners of business premises.

The 1968 act provided for a permanent boundary commission to determine future constituencies of the Northern Ireland parliament. Political scientist John Whyte identified this in 1971 as a distinction from how constituencies were devised in the Republic of Ireland.

The revised constituencies took effect at the 1969 Northern Ireland general election. This was the final general election to the Northern Ireland Parliament, which was abolished under the Northern Ireland Constitution Act 1973.

Its enactment is noted as a milestone in the removal of discrimination in Northern Ireland.
