= Hugh MacDowell Pollock =

British politician

The Right Honourable Hugh MacDowell Pollock CH, MP
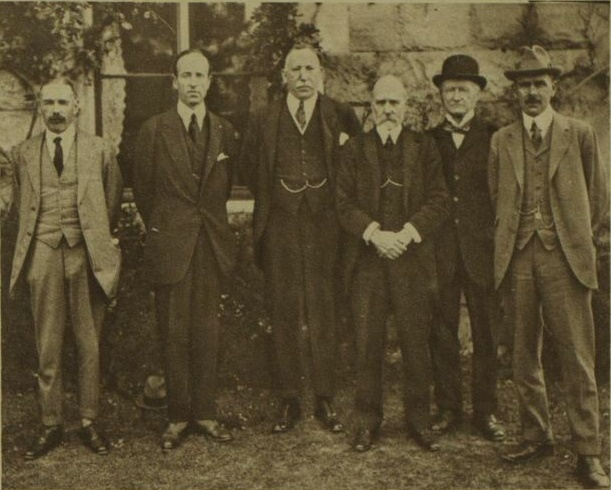
- Pollock (third from right) in 1921

Minister of Finance
- In office 1921–1937
- Constituency: Belfast South (1921-28)
- Constituency: Belfast Windsor (1928-37)

Personal details
- Born: 1852
- Died: 15 April 1937 (aged 84–85)
- Party: Ulster Unionist Party
- Spouse: Annie Robinson
- Children: 5
- Occupation: Businessman, Politician, Landowner

Hugh MacDowell Pollock, CH, PC(Ire) (16 November 1852 – 15 April 1937) was an Ulster Unionist member of the Parliament of Northern Ireland from 1921 until his death in 1937, being appointed as the country's first Minister of Finance.

== Life ==
Pollock was born in Bangor, County Down on 16 November 1852, third and youngest son of 'Hugh' James Pollock, master mariner, and his wife, Eliza MacDowell. Educated at Bangor Endowed school, he served a shipbroking apprenticeship, then moved to McIlroy, Pollock, flour importers, which became the central vehicle of his business career, and which, under the name Shaw, Pollock & Co., grew into the largest such enterprise in Ireland. His business interests included directorships in manufacturing, shipping, and linen companies, and it was his acumen in this field that brought him to public prominence during the latter part of the First World War. He served as a Belfast Harbour Commissioner from 1899 until 1937, becoming president of the commission from 1918 to 1921. In 1917, Pollock was appointed director of wheat supplies under the food controller for the north of Ireland, having been elected President of the Belfast Chamber of Commerce in 1917/18.

Due to such accolades he was nominated ex officio to the Irish Convention (1917–18). His mastery of Anglo-Irish financial complexities quickly earned him respect and nomination to the convention's inner committee of nine. In 1918 he was appointed chairman of the Ulster selective committee, of the Ministry of Labour, a post he held until 1921, when in the general election he was elected in Belfast South and was immediately appointed as Northern Ireland's first Minister of Finance and deputy premier to James Craig, 1st Viscount Craigavon. The constituency was abolished in 1929; thus, Pollock moved to represent Belfast Windsor, and served until his death in 1937.

The optimistic economic assumptions of the immediate post-war period had already been confounded by the time Pollock took office. His input to the Northern Ireland special arbitration committee (1923–5) established to review the province's funding and chaired by Lord Colwyn, ensured that Northern Ireland would be able to keep parity of social benefits with the rest of the United Kingdom, but he was unable, in the depressed conditions of the inter-war years and under the newly agreed formula, to bring Northern Ireland's underdeveloped services, in education, health, housing, and general infrastructure, up to the national level. Still, his judicious use of the loans guarantee acts, well into the 1930s, did keep up a measure of activity in a shipbuilding industry that might otherwise have perished. In 1932 he attended the Imperial Economic Conference at Ottawa as an advisory member of the British delegation headed by Stanley Baldwin. He was appointed a Member of the Order of the Companions of Honour in 1936 in respect of the vast impact he made on the Northern Irish political and economic landscape.

One of the province's leading educationists, Pollock had given evidence to the viceregal committee of inquiry into primary education (Ireland) in 1918 and in 1922 he chaired a committee to provide for teacher training in the north. For many years he served as chairman of the board of Victoria College, Belfast, one of the United Kingdom's pioneering institutions of female education.

Widely travelled and read, he enjoyed golf and shooting and belonged to the Ulster Reform Club and to the Overseas League, in which he played a prominent part.

== Irish Convention 1917-1918 ==
Pollock was an Ulster delegate to the 1917-18 Irish Convention, taking part in the Grand Committee whose aims were to help resolve the important political decision of the "Irish Question" and other constitutional problems relating to an early enactment of self-government for Ireland, to debate its wider future, discuss and come to an understanding on recommendations as to the best manner and means this goal could be achieved. It was a response to the dramatically altered Irish political climate after the 1916 rebellion and proposed by David Lloyd George, Prime Minister of the United Kingdom of Great Britain and Ireland, in May 1917 to John Redmond, leader of the Irish Parliamentary Party, announcing that 'Ireland should try her hand at hammering out an instrument of government for her own people'.

== Legacy ==
Pollock had five children: four sons and a daughter. Pollock's daughter, Adelaide Franklin Pollock, achieved notoriety as an adventurer and women pioneer in aviation in the 1920s and 30s. She was an avid mountain climber, expert driver and skilled motor mechanic. Adelaide was one of the few women to be granted a pilot's licence in the UK in the inter war era. She flew from London to India and back in 1929 and in the following year, boarded a steamer from London to New York, with her 'Moth' on board, with the intention of becoming the first British woman to fly across the United States. After many thrills and spills, she eventually achieved this goal, being welcomed in Hollywood, California as somewhat of a major celebrity. She subsequently visited China, Japan and Egypt in her travels across the globe.

In recognition of his vast achievements, Pollock dock in Belfast Harbour is named after him.

Parliament of Northern Ireland
New constituency	Member of Parliament for Belfast South; 1921–1929; With: Thomas Moles 1921–1929; Julia McMordie 1921–1925; Crawford McCullagh 1921–1925; Arthur Black 1925–1929; Philip James Woods 1925; Anthony Babington 1925–1929	Constituency abolished
New constituency	Member of Parliament for Belfast Windsor; 1929–1937	Succeeded by William Dowling
Political offices
New office	Minister of Finance; 1921–1937	Succeeded by J. M. Andrews
