= Larkfield (Northern Ireland Parliament constituency) =

Constituency of the Northern Ireland Parliament (1969–1973)

Coordinates: 54.586°N 5.956°W

- Former County constituency for the Parliament of Northern Ireland
- Larkfield shown within Northern Ireland

Former constituency
- Created: 1969
- Abolished: 1973
- Election method: First past the post

Larkfield was a single-member county constituency of the Parliament of Northern Ireland.

== Boundaries and boundary changes ==
Before 1969, the area formed part of the Northern Ireland Parliament constituencies of Mid-Down and South Antrim.

Larkfield was created by the Electoral Law Act (Northern Ireland) 1968 as a division of County Antrim. It was located to the south-west of Belfast, straddling the Upper Malone Road, Upper Lisburn Road and M1 motorway, and comprised "part of the rural district of Lisburn which consists of the district electoral divisions of Andersonstown, Ardmore, Ballygammon, Dunmurry, Finaghy, Ladybrook, and Upper Malone". The boundaries of those divisions are set out in the Lisburn Rural District (Electoral Areas) Order (NI) 1963.

The constituency sent one MP to the House of Commons of Northern Ireland at the 1969 Northern Ireland general election. The Parliament was prorogued on 30 March 1972, under the terms of the Northern Ireland (Temporary Provisions) Act 1972. It was formally abolished in 1973 when the Northern Ireland Constitution Act 1973 received Royal Assent on 18 July 1973.

The parliamentary representative of the division was elected using the first-past-the-post system.

== Member of Parliament ==
Election	Member	Party
1969	Basil McIvor	Ulster Unionist
1973	constituency abolished	

== Election results ==
General Election 24 February 1969: Larkfield
Party	Candidate	Votes	%	±%
UUP	Basil McIvor	8,501	59.90	
National Democratic	Tom Sherry	2,386	16.81	
NI Labour	Tom Magee	1,714	12.08	
Republican Labour	Gerry O'Hare	1,591	11.21	
Majority		6,115	43.09	
Turnout		20,774	68.32	
UUP win (new seat)				

- Parliament prorogued 30 March 1972 and abolished 18 July 1973
