= Robert Getgood =

Irish trade unionist (1884–1964)

Robert Getgood (23 March 1884 – 30 November 1964) was a politician and trade unionist in Northern Ireland. He was born in Ballymacanallen, Co Down, the son of George Getgood, a cobbler, and Eliza Jane Patton. In 1921 he married Annie Thompson.

Getgood joined the Amalgamated Transport and General Workers Union (ATGWU), and later became its Textile Officer. He also joined the Northern Ireland Labour Party (NILP). In 1931, he stood in an election for the Chairmanship of the party against Harry Midgley and Sam Kyle, but they were all beaten by Hugh Gemmell. However, Midgley became chair later in the decade. During a dispute about the Spanish Civil War, Midgley stood down and Getgood finally became chair in 1938.

In 1940, Getgood was elected to the Executive of the Irish Trades Union Congress (ITUC), and he became chair in 1944. He stood for Westminster for the NILP at the 1943 Antrim by-election, taking second place, with 28.3% of the votes cast.

Getgood stood in Belfast Oldpark at the 1945 Northern Ireland general election, and gained the seat from the Alexander Hungerford of the Ulster Unionist Party. However, he lost the seat to the Unionists at the 1949 general election.

Getgood retired from active trade unionism in 1947. He resigned as Chairman of the NILP in 1948, after it came close to declaring in favour of the partition of Ireland. In 1952, he acted as a delegate to the Moral Rearmament World Assembly held at Caux.

Trade union offices
Preceded by Michael Keyes	President of the Irish Trades Union Congress; 1944	Succeeded by Gilbert Lynch
Parliament of Northern Ireland
Preceded by Sir Wilson Hungerford	Member of Parliament for Belfast Oldpark; 1945–1949	Succeeded by William James Morgan
Party political offices
Preceded by John Boyle	Chair of the Northern Ireland Labour Party; 1947	Succeeded by Henry Holmes
