= Thomas Henry Burn =

Politician from Northern Ireland

- Burn in 1921

Member of Parliament for Belfast St Anne's
- In office 1918–1922
- Preceded by: New constituency
- Succeeded by: Constituency abolished

Member of Parliament for Belfast West
- In office 1921–1925

Personal details
- Born: 19 January 1875 Belfast, Ireland
- Died: 7 June 1949 (aged 74) Belfast, Northern Ireland
- Party: Ulster Unionist Party

Thomas Henry Burn (19 January 1875 – 7 June 1949) was an Ulster Unionist member of the Parliament of the United Kingdom and the Parliament of Northern Ireland. He represented Belfast St Anne's in the former from 1918 to 1922, and Belfast West in the latter from 1921 to 1925.

Burn was born at 21 Wesley Street, Belfast on 19 January 1875 and was the son of linen worker Thomas Henry Burn and Agnes Cassidy. He was educated at Belfast National School and subsequently trained as a lithographic printer.

He was Assistant Parliamentary Secretary at the Ministry of Finance and Assistant Whip from 1921 until 1925.

He lost his seat at the 1925 Northern Ireland general election.

== Sources ==
- Northern Ireland Parliament Elections Results: Biographies

Parliament of the United Kingdom
New constituency	Member of Parliament for Belfast St Anne's; 1918–1922	Constituency abolished
Parliament of Northern Ireland
New constituency	Member of Parliament for Belfast West; 1921–1925; With: Robert Lynn; Joseph Devlin; William J. Twaddell to 1923; Philip James Woods from 1923	Succeeded by Robert Lynn; Joseph Devlin; Philip James Woods; William McMullen
Political offices
New office	Assistant Parliamentary Secretary to the Ministry of Finance; 1921–1925	Succeeded by Henry Mulholland
Party political offices
New office	Unionist Assistant Whip; 1921–1925	Succeeded by Henry Mulholland
