= Wilson Hungerford =

Irish Unionist politician

Member of Parliament for Belfast Oldpark
- In office 1925–1945

Unionist Chief Whip
- In office 1944–1945

Personal details
- Born: 1884; Belfast, Ireland
- Died: 19 January 1969 (aged 84–85)
- Political party: Irish Unionist Party

Sir Alexander Wilson Hungerford (1884 – 19 January 1969), known as Wilson Hungerford, was a Unionist politician in Northern Ireland.

== Biography ==
Born in Belfast, Hungerford was employed by the Irish Unionist Party from 1912. In 1921, he became Secretary of the Ulster Unionist Council, serving until 1941, and was also Secretary of the Ulster Unionist Labour Association. At the 1929 Northern Ireland general election, Hungerford was elected to represent Belfast Oldpark. He was also knighted in 1929.

Hungerford was appointed as an Assistant Whip in 1933, and given the title "Assistant Parliamentary Secretary to the Ministry of Finance". In 1941, he moved to become Parliamentary Secretary to the Ministry of Commerce. In 1943 he moved to the same post in the Ministry of Home Affairs, and in 1944 to Health and Local Government, before becoming Chief Whip in November, serving until the 1945 general election, when he lost his seat.

In 1948, Hungerford was elected to the Senate of Northern Ireland, serving until 1957, including a stint as Deputy Speaker from 1953 until 1956.

He retired to England and lived at Dragons, a prominent house in Upper Park, Loughton, Essex.

Parliament of Northern Ireland
New constituency	Member of Parliament for Belfast Oldpark; 1925–1945	Succeeded by Robert Getgood
Party political offices
Preceded by Dawson Bates	Secretary of the Ulster Unionist Council; 1921–1941	Succeeded by Billy Douglas
Preceded by Sir Basil Brooke	Unionist Assistant Whip; 1933–1941	Succeeded by Sir Norman Stronge
Preceded by Sir Norman Stronge	Unionist Chief Whip; 1944–1945	Succeeded by Lancelot Curran
Political offices
Preceded by Sir Basil Brooke	Assistant Parliamentary Secretary to the Ministry of Finance; 1933–1941	Succeeded by Sir Norman Stronge
Vacant	Parliamentary Secretary to the Ministry of Commerce; 1941–1943	Succeeded by Brian Maginess
Preceded by William Lowry	Parliamentary Secretary to the Ministry of Home Affairs; 1943–1944	Vacant Title next held by Terence O'Neill
New post	Parliamentary Secretary to the Ministry of Health and Local Government; 1944	Vacant
Preceded by Sir Norman Stronge	Parliamentary Secretary to the Ministry of Finance; 1944–1945	Succeeded by Lancelot Curran
