= Maynard Sinclair =

Major The Right Honourable Maynard Sinclair
- Maynard Sinclair, centre with garland, upon winning his constituency in the NI general election (14 February 1949)

Minister of Finance
- In office 6 May 1943 – 31 January 1953
- Monarchs: George VI; Elizabeth II
- Prime Minister: Sir Basil Brooke
- Preceded by: Milne Barbour
- Succeeded by: Vacant next held by Brian Maginess

Personal details
- Born: 4 August 1896 Belfast, Ireland, UK
- Died: 31 January 1953 (aged 56) North Channel
- Spouse: Marjorie Claridge
- Education: Royal Belfast Academical Institution

John Maynard Sinclair (4 August 1896 – 31 January 1953) was a unionist politician in Northern Ireland. Born in Belfast, in 1896, son of John Sinclair DL and Alice Montgomery, he was educated at the Royal Belfast Academical Institution, and in Switzerland. He served in the British Army during World War I. He was a director of the Eagle Star Insurance Company and Chairman of Vulcanite Ltd.

== Military career ==
Sincliar served in the Royal Irish Rifles and Royal Irish Fusiliers during World War I, attaining the rank of Captain. In October 1937 he raised and commanded the Antrim Fortress Royal Engineers at Victoria Barracks, Belfast, one of the first Territorial Army (TA) units in Northern Ireland. He was promoted to the local rank of Major, and was awarded the honorary rank after his retirement from the command. He was appointed Honorary Colonel of the unit's successors, 591 (Antrim) Independent Field Squadron, Royal Engineers, when the TA was reformed after World War II.

== Political career ==
His first attempt to be elected to the Parliament of Northern Ireland was unsuccessful; he contested the Mourne division in 1933. He was elected to the House of Commons of Northern Ireland in 1938 for the division of Belfast Cromac. On 16 January 1941, he was appointed Parliamentary and Financial Secretary to the Minister of Finance (i.e. a junior minister). In May 1943, Sir Basil Brooke succeeded J. M. Andrews as Prime Minister of Northern Ireland; Maynard Sinclair was appointed Minister of Finance (de facto Deputy Prime Minister) in the Government of Northern Ireland on 6 May 1943 and was made a Privy Councillor (Northern Ireland). He was regarded by the officers of his TA unit as a much more liberal individual than his Prime Minister, Sir Basil Brooke. The opinion of those former officers who knew him was that his politics were not unlike those of Captain Terence O'Neill and that, had he lived to become Prime Minister of Northern Ireland, the complete history of the province would have been different.

== Death ==
Maynard Sinclair was one of 135 passengers drowned in the sinking of the ferry MV Princess Victoria on 31 January 1953, en route across the North Channel from Stranraer to Larne. He was survived by his wife, Marjorie Claridge.

== Memorials ==
The pavilion of the Northern Ireland Civil Service (NICS) Sports and Social Club on the Stormont Estate in Belfast is named the "Maynard Sinclair Pavilion". The children's ward at the Ulster Hospital at Dundonald is named the "Maynard Sinclair Children’s Ward". There is also a Major J. M. Sinclair Memorial Pipe Band which was formed shortly after his death and can still be found in competition throughout Northern Ireland and Scotland.

Parliament of Northern Ireland
Preceded by Anthony Babington	Member of Parliament for Belfast Cromac; 1938–1953	Succeeded by Joseph Morgan
Political offices
Vacant Title last held by Alexander Gordon	Parliamentary and Financial Secretary, Ministry of Finance; 1941–43	Office abolished
Preceded by Sir Milne Barbour, Bt.	Minister of Finance; 1943–53	Succeeded by Brian Maginess, QC.
