= Robert Lynn (Northern Ireland politician) =

Northern Irish politician (1873–1945)

Sir Robert John Lynn
- Lynn in 1923

Member of Parliament for Belfast West Belfast Woodvale (1918–1922)
- In office 14 December 1918 – 10 May 1929
- Preceded by: Constituency established
- Succeeded by: William Edward David Allen

Personal details
- Born: 31 January 1873
- Died: 5 August 1945 (aged 72)
- Party: UUP

Sir Robert John Lynn (31 January 1873 – 5 August 1945) was a British Ulster Unionist Party politician. In March 1924 he was knighted.

== Parliamentary career ==
He was elected as the Member of Parliament (MP) for Belfast Woodvale from 1918 general election to 1922, and when that constituency was abolished for the 1922 general election he was returned for Belfast West, holding the seat until he stood down at the 1929 general election.

At the 1921 Northern Irish general election Lynn was elected as a member of the Parliament of Northern Ireland for Belfast West, holding that seat until it was abolished for the 1929 Northern Irish general election. He was elected for the new North Antrim constituency, and held that seat until 1945. From 1937 to 1944 he was Deputy Speaker of the Northern Ireland House of Commons.

== Journalistic career ==
Lynn was the editor of the Northern Whig newspaper. He was a leading contributor to educational debates in Northern Ireland though his impartiality is in question, especially following a comment in the Northern Irish House of Commons that Irish language instruction was not worth spending money on. Lynn at first attacked the 1923 education bill for stripping Protestant schools of their denominational character. However, Lord Londonderry—the Education Minister at the time—persuaded him to support the measure making the latter one of the few public proponents of what amounted to nondenominational schooling.

In 1902, the Education Act had been withheld from Ireland at the insistence of Roman Catholic bishops, the result of which was that education reform in Northern Ireland lagged behind that of the rest of the country by 1920. Lynn was asked by the Northern Irish government to look into reforms in education in 1921 and he set up what became known as the Lynn Committee. However, Roman Catholics refused to serve on or cooperate with the committee. Much guidance was therefore required of Roman Catholic Unionist, A. N. Bonaparte Wyse (who later became Permanent Secretary to the Ministry of Education in Northern Ireland).

While Roman Catholic representatives boycotted the committee, Lynn recommended government funding for a separate Roman Catholic education system in Northern Ireland. When the Lynn Committee published its report in 1923, its recommendations were adopted and made law by the Education Bill (NI) of 1923.

On the difficulties of their dealings with the Roman Catholic hierarchy, the Lynn Committee said this in their report:

"We hope that, notwithstanding the disadvantage at which we were placed by this action, it will be found that Roman Catholic interests have not suffered. We have throughout been careful to keep in mind and to make allowance for the particular points of view of Roman Catholics in regard to education so far as is known to us, and it has been our desire to refrain as far as we could from recommending any course which might be thought to be contrary to their wishes."

— Lynn Committee report, 1923

The Bill was bitterly assailed by both Catholic and Protestant clerics and was subsequently amended so that its original intent disappeared.

Parliament of the United Kingdom
New constituency	Member of Parliament for Belfast Woodvale; 1918–1922	constituency abolished
New constituency	Member of Parliament for Belfast West; 1922–1929	Succeeded by William Edward David Allen
Parliament of Northern Ireland
New constituency	Member of Parliament for Belfast West; 1921–1929; With: Joseph Devlin; Thomas Henry Burn to 1925; William J. Twaddell to 1923; Philip James Woods from 1923; William McMullen from 1925	Constituency abolished
New constituency	Member of Parliament for North Antrim; 1929–1945	Succeeded by William McCleery
Political offices
Preceded by John Clarke Davison	Chairman of Ways and Means and Deputy Speaker of the Northern Ireland House of Commons; 1937–1945	Succeeded by Howard Stevenson
