= Robin Bailie =

Northern Irish politician (born 1937)

Robin John Bailie, PC (NI) (born 6 March 1937) is a Northern Irish solicitor and former politician.

== Biography ==
Bailie was born in Toomebridge, County Antrim. He studied at the Rainey Endowed School and Queen's University, Belfast. He was a member of the Belfast Junior Chamber of Commerce, and an officer of the Ulster Young Unionist Council. He was associated with the Clifton branch of the Ulster Unionist Party, and from about 1960, collaborated with other young branch members, including Bob Cooper in an association which has been compared to the Conservative Party's Bow Group. They represented the more liberal wing of the party, and in 1962 they launched a journal, Review, although they were only able to publish a single issue.

== Career ==
Bailie qualified as a solicitor and was also active in business, becoming a council member of the Northern Ireland Chamber of Commerce and Industry. In 1962, he claimed that a majority of members of some Orange Lodges in Belfast were socialists and not Unionists. He was a supporter of Terence O'Neill's reforms, believing that they had "taken the sting out of the community tension which was sapping the vigour of the province". While he was initially critical of O'Neill's approach to the Irish Congress of Trade Unions (ICTU), he later claimed that O'Neill had "solved the problem of the ICTU".

At the 1969 Northern Ireland general election, Bailie was elected as Member of Parliament for Newtownabbey. He was a prominent opponent of the People's Democracy movement, which he claimed was a revolutionary movement.

On 25 March 1971, new Prime Minister Brian Faulkner appointed him Minister of Commerce, and he served until the Parliament was prorogued in 1972. Bailie was also appointed to the Privy Council of Northern Ireland at the same time, which entitles him to the style The Right Honourable. While serving in this post, he focussed on the possibilities that membership of the Common Market would offer Northern Ireland and investigated the possibility of a cross-border development plan for the North West of Ireland.

After prorogation, Faulkner maintained a "shadow" cabinet in which Bailie retained his post, but he resigned from the cabinet and the party in 1973 alongside Robert Porter, claiming that Faulkner was identifying too closely with the Ulster Vanguard movement. Bailie joined the Alliance Party of Northern Ireland, but retired from active politics.

Out of politics, Bailie focussed on his career as a solicitor and held several directorships, including the Goodyear Tyre and Rubber Company (GB), Fine Wine Wholesalers, and Lumnus Mackie.

Parliament of Northern Ireland
New constituency	Member of Parliament for Newtownabbey; 1969–1973	Parliament abolished
Political offices
Preceded by Roy Bradford	Minister of Commerce and Production; 1971–1972	Post abolished
