= William J. Twaddell =

Unionist politician from Belfast (1884–1922)

William John Twaddell (1884 – 22 May 1922) was a Unionist politician from Belfast.

He was a draper who was educated at a Belfast primary school.

He was a member of the Ulster Unionist Party and from 1910 he was a member of Belfast City Council. In November 1921, he and Robert Boyd organised the Ulster Imperial Guards as a paramilitary force of 21,000 men. He was elected to the Parliament of Northern Ireland for Belfast West in the 1921 general election and sat until he was assassinated on 22 May 1922 by the Irish Republican Army (IRA). He was walking in Garfield Street off Royal Avenue, to his business, a short distance away, and had been followed closely by his assassins.

His death precipitated a clamp-down on anti-partitionists and the IRA in Northern Ireland with over 400 people being interned. Many internees were ordinary citizens held for up to two years under brutal conditions on the prison ship HMS Argenta. The IRA leader Seamus Woods, who was interned on Argenta during the clampdown, was charged with his murder. Woods who had joined the Irish National Army was trying to control irregular elements within the IRA. By agreement with the government of Northern Ireland, two officers of the Irish National Army were given permission to travel to the trial. General Ginger O'Connell and Commandant Charles McAlister gave evidence and Woods was found not guilty.

Twaddell was buried at Drumcree Church where his headstone says that he was 'foully murdered in Belfast'.

Parliament of Northern Ireland
New constituency	Member of Parliament for Belfast West; 1921–1922; With: Joseph Devlin; Thomas Henry Burn; Robert Lynn	Succeeded by Philip James Woods; Joseph Devlin; Thomas Henry Burn; Robert Lynn
