= Philip James Woods =

Colonel Philip James Woods CMG DSO (23 September 1880 – 12 September 1961) was an independent unionist politician in Northern Ireland, member of the Northern Ireland House of Commons. He was a colonel in the Royal Irish Rifles, seeing action on the Western Front in the First World War and in Karelia where he raised and led a local regiment during the Allied intervention in North Russia. In Belfast he worked as a textile designer.

== Early years ==
Woods was educated at the Royal Belfast Academical Institution and at the Belfast School of Art. For four years he was employed as a textile designer in a firm of linen manufacturer in Belfast. Under age for regular enlistment in the South African War, he joined Robert Baden Powell's South African Constabulary, serving nearly two years before returning to Belfast and his previous employment. In the Home Rule Crisis he joined the Ulster Volunteers and was involved in the gun-running that armed the force with German munitions.

== Military career ==
On the outbreak of the First World War he joined the Royal Irish Rifles (RIR), part of the 36th (Ulster) Division, and, during the 1916 Battle of the Somme, was active in the Thiepval Wood section when it suffered heavy losses achieving its objectives. In 1917 Woods led the 9th (West Belfast) Battalion of the RIR until it was amalgamated with 8th Bn to form 8/9th Bn. on 9 August 1917. This leadership included action in the Battle of Messines.

In June 1918 he became a member of the Murmansk force involved in the Allied intervention to Russia. Its task was to obstruct the Viena expedition by pro-German White Finnish forces threatening East Karelia and the Murmansk-Petrograd railway. Operating out of Kem on the White Sea, he established a Karelian Regiment, supplied and officered by the British. The "Irish Karelians", as they were known, adopted a regimental badge, designed by Woods and consisting of a green shamrock on an orange field. With this force he was able to push the Germans and Finns established in Uhtua out of White Karelia (Vienan Karjala) in 1918. His success with the Karelians fostered unrealistic hopes of national self-determination which were ultimately unfulfilled, caught as they were between the Finns and Russians. The formation melted away as a transfer to White Russian command was attempted and Woods was evacuated in October 1919 with the rest of the British forces.

In 1919-1920 he served with a group of British officers organising the nascent Lithuanian Army, defending it against various German Freikorps and Polish threats. Arguments over their agreed British Army rates of pay led to the group eventually leaving Lithuania.

== Political career ==
Standing as the Fighting Colonel he was first elected in a by-election held on 2 May 1923 for Belfast West, following the assassination of William Twaddell, the sitting MP. He campaigned on a platform of ultra-loyalism and working-class grievances, and expressed the discontent in the Royal Ulster Constabulary and their part-time reserve, the Ulster Special Constabulary (USC), over security policy. He objected to the appointment of English officers, the dismissal of District Inspector John William Nixon in February 1924 as a result of the McMahon killings, and in March 1924 reductions to the USC.

Woods stood in 1925 in both Belfast West and Belfast South, winning both seats, but opting to sit for Belfast West. He campaigned in the Parliament for ex-servicemen and on economic and social issues. As the only MP without party affiliations before the Nationalists took their seats, he operated as a lone opposition voice to the dominant Ulster Unionist Party government. In the 1929 election, he unsuccessfully contested Belfast St Anne's. His loss can, in large part, be attributed to the abolition of proportional representation in February 1929, its replacement with a first-past-the-post system and the establishment of new electoral constituencies which divided his support base. Lacking a party machine, he also lost the Westminster election in Belfast South held eight days later.

== Later life ==
After his political career in Northern Ireland had ended, Woods moved to England in the 1930s and remarried, living in Long Crendon, Buckinghamshire. He was incidentally an employer of William Joyce at this time, but had no direct links with the British Union of Fascists. During the Second World War he fund-raised in Yorkshire for the war effort.

Woods died on 12 September 1961. He was survived by his second wife, Veronica Quested (m. 1934), and by a daughter from his first marriage in 1907 to Florence Edith Blacker Quin of Belfast.

Parliament of Northern Ireland
Preceded by Thomas Henry Burn; Robert Lynn; Joseph Devlin; William J. Twaddell	Member of Parliament for Belfast West; 1923–1929; With: Thomas Henry Burn to 1925; Robert Lynn to 1929; Joseph Devlin to 1929; William McMullen from 1925	Constituency abolished
Preceded by Thomas Moles; Hugh Pollock; Julia McMordie; Crawford McCullagh	Member of Parliament for Belfast South; 1925; With: Thomas Moles; Hugh Pollock; Arthur Black	Succeeded by Thomas Moles; Hugh Pollock; Arthur Black; Anthony Babington
