= Belfast South (Northern Ireland Parliament constituency) =

Coordinates: 54.577°N 5.923°W

- Former Borough constituency for the Parliament of Northern Ireland
- Belfast South shown within Northern Ireland

Former constituency
- Created: 1921
- Abolished: 1929
- Election method: Single transferable vote

Belfast South was a borough constituency of the Parliament of Northern Ireland from 1921 to 1929. It returned four MPs, using proportional representation by means of the single transferable vote.

== Boundaries ==
Belfast South was created by the Government of Ireland Act 1920 and contained the Cromac, Ormeau and Windsor wards of the County Borough of Belfast. The House of Commons (Method of Voting and Redistribution of Seats) Act (Northern Ireland) 1929 divided the constituency into four constituencies elected under first past the post: Belfast Ballynafeigh, Belfast Cromac, Belfast Willowfield and Belfast Windsor.

== Second Dáil ==
In May 1921, Dáil Éireann, the parliament of the self-declared Irish Republic run by Sinn Féin, passed a resolution declaring that elections to the House of Commons of Northern Ireland and the House of Commons of Southern Ireland would be used as the election for the Second Dáil. All those elected were on the roll of the Second Dáil, but as no Sinn Féin MP was elected for Belfast South, it was not represented there.

== Politics ==
Belfast South was a strongly Unionist area, returning four Unionists in 1921 and 3 Unionists and 1 Independent Unionist MP in 1925. Even following its abolition, Ballynafeigh, Cromac, and Windsor only ever elected Unionist MPs.

== MPs ==
| Election | Member (Party) | Member (Party) | Member (Party) | Member (Party) |
|---|---|---|---|---|
| MPs (1921) | Thomas Moles (Ulster Unionist Party) | Hugh Pollock (Ulster Unionist Party) | Julia McMordie (Ulster Unionist Party) | Crawford McCullagh (Ulster Unionist Party) |
| MPs (1925) | Thomas Moles (Ulster Unionist Party) | Hugh Pollock (Ulster Unionist Party) | Arthur Black (Ulster Unionist Party) | Philip James Woods (Independent Unionist) |
| MPs (1925 by-election) | Thomas Moles (Ulster Unionist Party) | Hugh Pollock (Ulster Unionist Party) | Arthur Black (Ulster Unionist Party) | Anthony Babington (Ulster Unionist Party) |

== Election results ==
24 May 1921 General Election: Belfast South (4 seats)
| Party | Candidate | FPv% | Count | | |
| Party | Candidate | FPv% | 1 | 2 | 3 |
|---|---|---|---|---|---|
| UUP | Thomas Moles | 42.5 | 17,248 | | |
| UUP | Hugh Pollock | 15.6 | 6,334 | 11,866 | |
| UUP | Crawford McCullagh | 12.5 | 5,068 | 7,679 | |
| Sinn Féin | Dermot Barnes | 6.7 | 2,719 | 2,720 | 2,721 |
| UUP | Julia McMordie | 5.9 | 2,372 | 4,197 | 8,784 |
| Nationalist | B. McCoy | 4.2 | 1,688 | 1,690 | 1,693 |
| Belfast Labour | James Baird | 2.2 | 875 | 891 | 905 |
Electorate: 40,566 Valid: 36,304 Quota: 7,261 Turnout: 89.5%

1925 General Election: Belfast South (4 seats)
| Party | Candidate | FPv% | Count | | | | |
| Party | Candidate | FPv% | 1 | 2 | 3 | 4 | 5 |
|---|---|---|---|---|---|---|---|
| Ind. Unionist | Philip James Woods | 20.5 | 8,814 | | | | |
| UUP | Thomas Moles | 18.0 | 7,756 | | | | |
| UUP | Hugh Pollock | 9.9 | 4,291 | 4,816 | 5,961 | | |
| Town Tenants Association | William Magill | 7.7 | 3,320 | 5,382 | 5,436 | 5,442 | 5,573 |
| UUP | Arthur Black | 7.4 | 3,176 | 3,440 | 3,821 | 3,892 | 5,710 |
| UUP | Crawford McCullagh | 4.0 | 1,707 | 1,857 | 2,220 | 2,291 | |
Electorate: 43,164 Valid: 29,064 Quota: 5,813 Turnout: 67.3%

Woods declined the seat, having also been elected for Belfast West.

1925 Belfast South by-election
| Party | Candidate | Votes | % | ±% |
|---|---|---|---|---|
| UUP | Anthony Babington | 18,857 | 68.0 | |
| NI Labour | G. M. Donaldson | 8,856 | 32.0 | |
| Majority | | 10,001 | 36.1 | |
| Turnout | | 27,713 | 64.2 | −3.1 |
| UUP hold | | Swing | | |
