= William Stewart (Belfast South MP) =

Member of Parliament for Belfast South
- In office 30 May 1929 – 15 June 1945
- Preceded by: Thomas Moles
- Succeeded by: Conolly Gage

Personal details
- Born: 1868
- Died: 14 May 1946 (aged 77–78)
- Party: Ulster Unionist Party

William John Stewart (1868 – 14 May 1946) was a Unionist politician in Northern Ireland who formed a Progressive Unionist Association to protest "autocratic" tendencies in the Unionist government and its lack of action on unemployment.

== Life ==
Stewart studied at Queen's College, Belfast and became managing director at Stewart and Partners, Ltd. In 1919 he was an Independent Unionist candidate. He was elected as Ulster Unionist Party (UUP) Member of Parliament (MP) for Belfast South at the 1929 general election. He was returned unopposed in 1931 and 1935. and was an MP to 1945.

Accusing the Unionist government of displaying "autocratic" tendencies, in April 1937 he formed the Justice for Ulster Committee which proposed limiting office in government to eight years or two parliaments.

In August 1937 he founded the Ulster Progressive Unionist Party. It called for greater action on unemployment and for bringing Northern Ireland up to British standards on housing and social services. Progressive Unionist candidates opposed UUP candidates in elections, but Stewart continued to take the Conservative and Unionist whip at Westminster.

Stewart retired from Parliament at the 1945 general election and died the following year, aged 77.

== Notes ==
Parliament of the United Kingdom
Preceded by Thomas Moles	Member of Parliament for Belfast South; 1929–1945	Succeeded by Conolly Gage
