= Belfast West (Northern Ireland Parliament constituency) =

Coordinates: 54.595°N 5.964°W

- Former Borough constituency for the Parliament of Northern Ireland
- Belfast West shown within Northern Ireland

Former constituency
- Created: 1921
- Abolished: 1929
- Election method: Single transferable vote

Belfast West was a borough constituency of the Parliament of Northern Ireland from 1921 to 1929. It returned four MPs, using proportional representation by means of the single transferable vote.

== Boundaries ==
Belfast West was created by the Government of Ireland Act 1920 and contained the Court, Falls, St Anne's, St George's, Smithfield and Woodvale wards of the County Borough of Belfast. The House of Commons (Method of Voting and Redistribution of Seats) Act (Northern Ireland) 1929 divided the constituency into four constituencies elected under first past the post: Belfast Central, Belfast Falls, Belfast St Anne's and Belfast Woodvale.

== Second Dáil ==
In May 1921, Dáil Éireann, the parliament of the self-declared Irish Republic run by Sinn Féin, passed a resolution declaring that elections to the House of Commons of Northern Ireland and the House of Commons of Southern Ireland would be used as the election for the Second Dáil. All those elected were on the roll of the Second Dáil, but as no Sinn Féin MP was elected for Belfast West, it was not represented there.

== Politics ==
Belfast West was a predominantly Unionist area with some pockets of Nationalist strength, electing three Unionists and one Nationalist in 1921 and one Unionist, one Independent Unionist, one Nationalist and one Labour Party member in 1925.

== Members of Parliament ==
Election	MP (Party)	MP (Party)	MP (Party)	MP (Party)
1921	William J. Twaddell (UUP)	Robert Lynn (UUP)	Thomas Henry Burn (UUP)	Joseph Devlin (Nationalist)
1923 by	Philip James Woods; Independent Unionist	Robert Lynn (UUP)	Thomas Henry Burn (UUP)	Joseph Devlin (Nationalist)
1925	Philip James Woods; Independent Unionist	Robert Lynn (UUP)	Billy McMullen (Labour)	Joseph Devlin (Nationalist)

== Election results ==
24 May 1921 General Election: Belfast West (4 seats)
Party	Candidate	FPv%	Count			
Party	Candidate	FPv%	1	2	3	4
UUP	Thomas Henry Burn	24.88	13,298			
Nationalist	Joseph Devlin	19.87	10,621	10,628	10,629	10,632
UUP	William Twaddell	19.30	10,316	10,558	11,509	
UUP	Robert Lynn	17.43	9,315	11,646		
Sinn Féin	Denis McCullough	11.73	6,270	6,272	6,274	6,274
Sinn Féin	Seán MacEntee	5.53	2,954	2,954	2,955	2,955
Belfast Labour	John Hanna	0.69	367	380	380	383
Nationalist	Richard Byrne	0.58	311	323	323	323
Electorate: 57,914 Valid: 53,452 Quota: 10,691 Turnout: 92.3%

Devlin did not take his seat.

Twaddell was assassinated on 22 May 1922:

1923 Belfast West by-election
Party	Candidate	Votes	%	±%
Ind. Unionist	Philip James Woods	25,761	55.3	New
UUP	Joseph Davison	19,360	41.6	−20.0
Majority		7,859	13.7	N/A
Turnout		46,597	69.3	−23.0
Ind. Unionist gain from UUP		Swing		

1925 General Election: Belfast West (4 seats)
Party	Candidate	FPv%	Count					
Party	Candidate	FPv%	1	2	3	4	5	6
Nationalist	Joseph Devlin	35.48	17,558					
Ind. Unionist	Philip James Woods	19.40	9,599	11,071				
UUP	Robert Lynn	16.92	8,371	8,507	8,599	10,437		
UUP	Thomas Henry Burn	9.80	4,808	4,878	4,921	5,989	6,509	6,515
Republican	J. McConville	6.78	3,146	4,456	4,511	4,545	4,552	
UUP	R. Dickson	6.33	3,133	3,438	3,623			
NI Labour	Billy McMullen	5.80	2,869	7,237	7,795	8,002	8,015	10,345
Electorate: 65,550 Valid: 49,484 Quota: 9,897 Turnout: 75.5%

Devlin did not take his seat.
