= Thomas Moles =

Northern Ireland politician (1871–1937)

- Moles in 1923

Member of Parliament for Belfast South
- In office 15 November 1922 – 30 May 1929
- Preceded by: William Arthur Lindsay (1918); Constituency recreated
- Succeeded by: William Stewart

Personal details
- Born: 13 November 1871 Belfast, Ireland
- Died: 3 February 1937 (aged 65)
- Party: Ulster Unionist Party
- Profession: Journalist

Thomas Moles (13 November 1871 – 3 February 1937) was a journalist and Ulster Unionist politician.

== Life ==
Born in Belfast in 1871, Moles was the son of Edward Moles and Margaret née Carson and was educated at the Collegiate School, Ballymena. A journalist by profession, he was Leader Writer for the Belfast Telegraph from 1909 until 1924 and managing editor for that newspaper from 1924.

Moles was an Irish representative on the British press visit to Canada in 1911. He was a member of the Secretariat to the Irish Convention from 1917 to 1918.

Moles was MP for Belfast Ormeau 1918–1922 and Belfast South at Westminster from 1922 until he retired in 1929.

He was also an MP in the Northern Ireland House of Commons from 1921 to 1929 for South Belfast and for Belfast, Ballynafeigh from 1929 to his death in 1937. He was the first ever member declared elected to the Northern Ireland House of Commons. He was Chairman of the Ways and Means and Deputy Speaker of the Northern Ireland House of Commons from 7 June 1921 until his death; and Member of the Privy Council of Northern Ireland in 1923.

Moles was married in Ramoan, Co Antrim on 20 March 1901 to Charlotte Brannigan and had three children. He was also a motorcycle enthusiast and helped to push through parliament the first Road Races Act, the Motor Vehicle Races Act (Northern Ireland) 1922, which made it legal for the roads on the Clady Course to be closed for the first Ulster Grand Prix motorcycle road race on 14 October 1922.

Parliament of the United Kingdom
| New constituency | Member of Parliament for Belfast Ormeau; 1918–1922 | Constituency abolished |
| New constituency | Member of Parliament for Belfast South; 1922–1929 | Succeeded by William Stewart |
Parliament of Northern Ireland
| New constituency | Member of Parliament for Belfast South; 1921–1929; With: Hugh Pollock 1921–1929; Julia McMordie 1921–1925; Crawford McCullagh 1921–1925; Arthur Black 1925–1929; Philip James Woods 1925; Anthony Babington 1925–1929 | Constituency abolished |
| New constituency | Member of Parliament for Belfast, Ballynafeigh; 1929–1937 | Succeeded by Frederick Thompson |
Political offices
| New office | Deputy Speaker of the Northern Ireland House of Commons; 1921–1937 | Succeeded by John Clarke Davison |
