= 1925 Northern Ireland general election =

- 3 April 1925

All 52 seats to the House of Commons of Northern Ireland 27 seats were needed for a majority

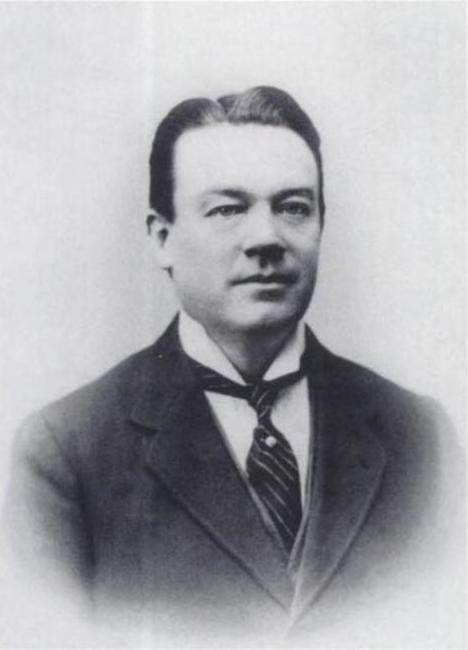

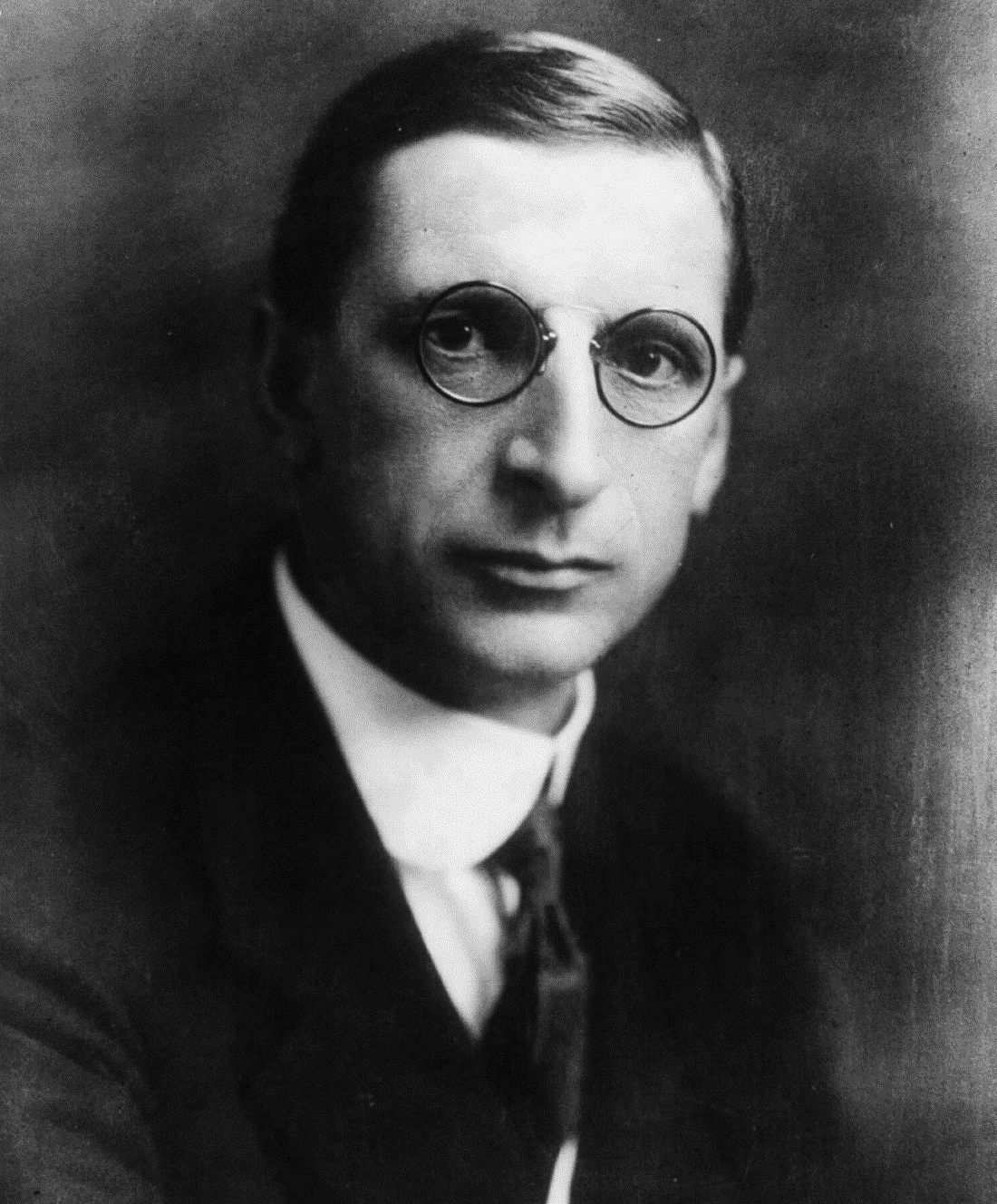
	First party	Second party
Leader	James Craig	Joe Devlin
Party	UUP	Nationalist
Leader since	7 June 1921	1918
Leader's seat	Down	Belfast West
Last election	40 seats, 66.9%	6 seats, 11.8%
Seats won	32 (Note: Includes 10 members elected unopposed.)	10 (Note: Includes 1 member elected unopposed.)
Seat change	▼8	▲4
Popular vote	211,662 (Note: The popular vote totals reflect returns from only 8 of the 10 constituencies, as in Down and QUB no actual voting took place and all of the candidates in these constituencies were elected unopposed.)	91,452
Percentage	55.0%	23.8%
Swing	▼11.9%	▲12.0%
	Third party	Fourth party
	NIL
Leader	Samuel Kyle	Éamon de Valera
Party	NI Labour	Republican
Leader since	1925	1917
Leader's seat	Belfast North	Down
Last election	0 seats, 0.6%	6 seats, 20.5%
Seats won	3	2 (Note: Includes 1 member elected unopposed.)
Seat change	▲3	▼4
Popular vote	18,114	20,615
Percentage	4.7%	5.3%
Swing	▲4.1%	▼15.2%
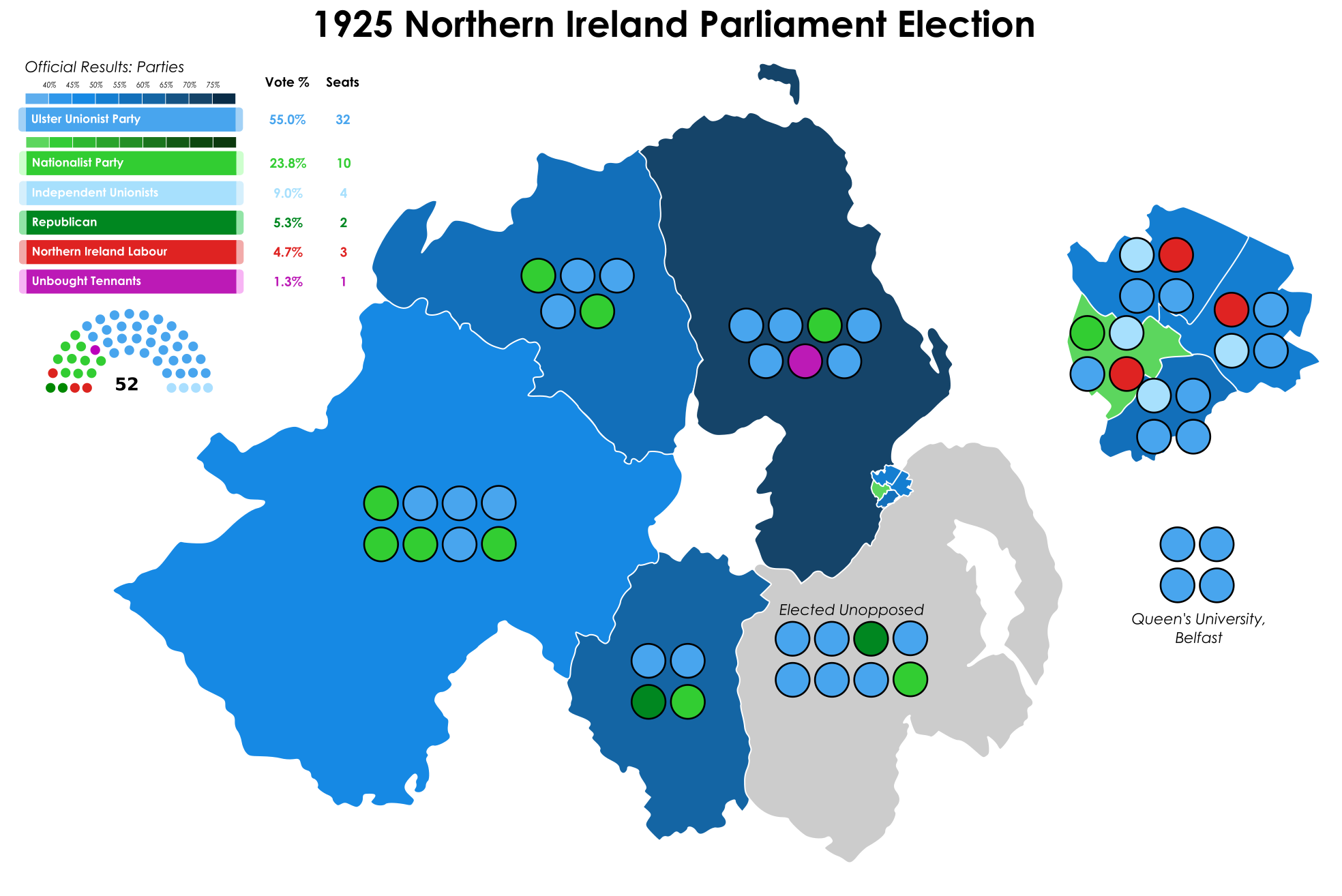
- Results of the 1925 Northern Ireland General Election.
Prime Minister before election
James Craig
UUP
Prime Minister after election
James Craig
UUP

The 1925 Northern Ireland general election was held on 3 April 1925. It was the second election to the Parliament of Northern Ireland. It saw significant losses for the Ulster Unionist Party, although they maintained their large majority. This was the last election for the Stormont parliament conducted using Single transferable voting, a form of Proportional Representation. Fifty-two members were elected in ten districts, which each elected between four and eight members. (Note: 12 of the 52 members were elected unopposed.) The Ulster Unionist government abolished proportional representation during this parliament and replaced it with the first-past-the-post system used in Great Britain.

== Results ==
32	10	4	3	2	1
UUP	Nationalist	IU	Lab	R

1925 Northern Ireland general election
Party	Candidates						Votes		
Party	Stood	Elected	Gained	Unseated	Net	% of total	%	No.	Net %
UUP	40	32	0	8	-8	61.5	55.0	211,662	-11.9
Nationalist	11	10	4	0	+4	19.2	23.8	91,452	+12.0
Ind. Unionist	4	4	4	0	+4	7.7	9.0	34,716	N/A
Republican	6	2	0	4	-4	3.8	5.3	20,615	-15.2
NI Labour	3	3	3	0	+3	5.8	4.7	18,114	+4.1
Unbought Tenants	1	1	1	0	+1	1.9	1.3	4,886	N/A
Town Tenants' Association	1	0	0	0	Steady	0.0	0.9	3,320	N/A

Electorate 611,683 (512,264 in contested seats); Turnout: 75.1% (384,745).

In Down (eight seats) and Queen's University of Belfast (four seats), no actual polling took place as all candidates were elected unopposed: 10 Ulster Unionist, 1 Nationalist and 1 Republican.

=== Votes summary ===
Popular vote
Ulster Unionist	55.01%
Nationalist Party	23.77%
Independent Unionist	9.02%
Republican	5.36%
Labour	4.71%
Unbought Tenants	1.27%
Tenants Associations	0.86%

=== Seats summary ===
Parliamentary seats
Ulster Unionist	61.54%
Nationalist Party	19.23%
Independent Unionist	7.69%
Labour	5.77%
Republican	3.85%
Unbought Tenants	1.92%
