= 1921 Northern Ireland general election =

- 24 May 1921

All 52 seats to the House of Commons of Northern Ireland 27 seats were needed for a majority
- Turnout: 88.0%

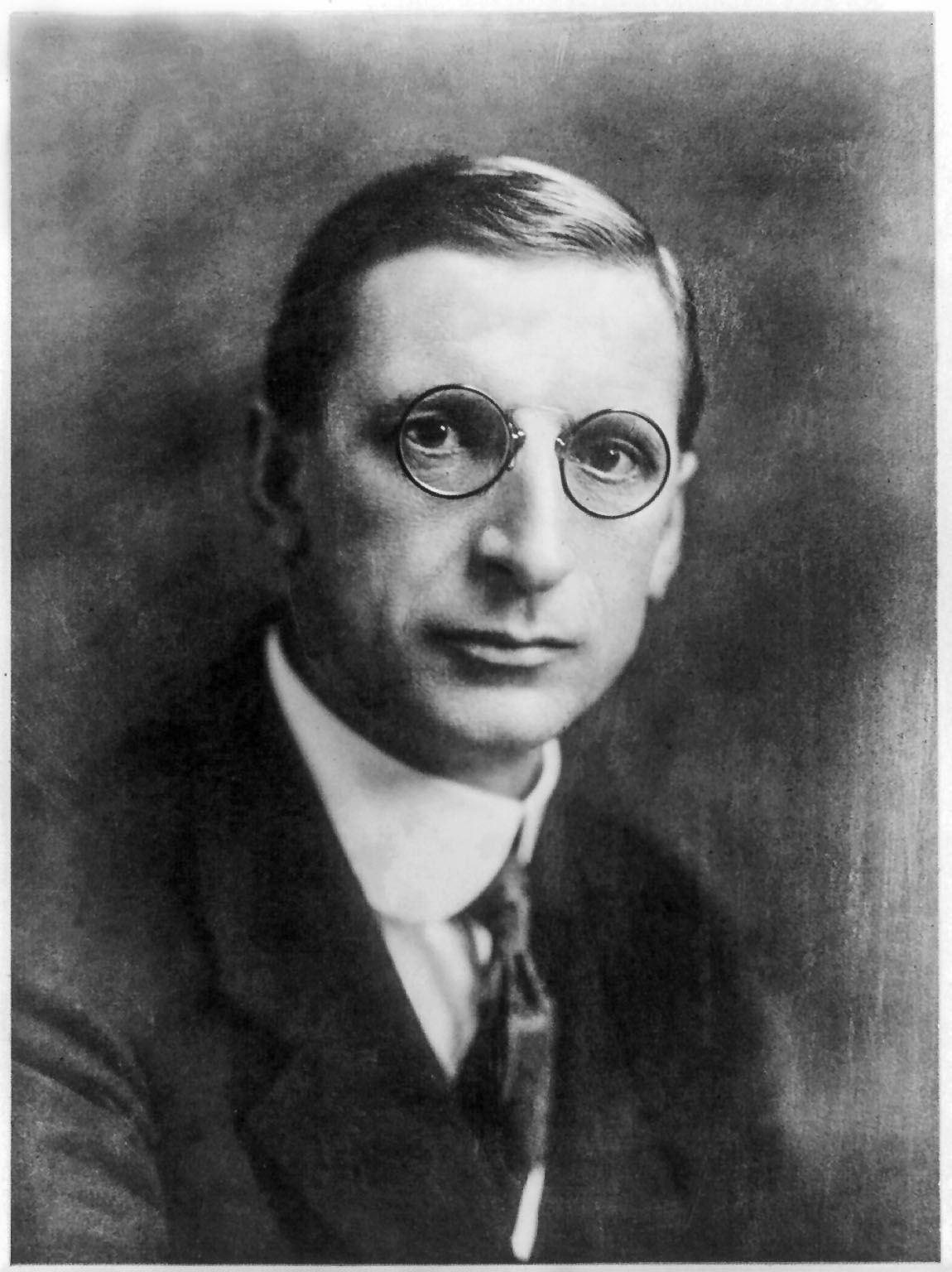

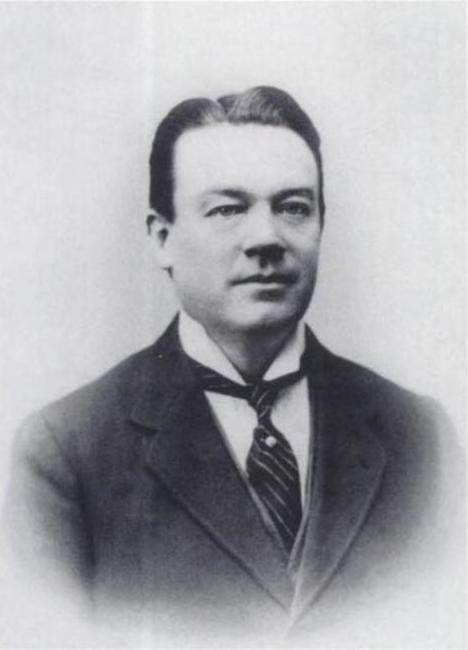
	First party	Second party	Third party
Leader	James Craig	Éamon de Valera	Joe Devlin
Party	UUP	Sinn Féin	Nationalist
Leader since	1921	1917	1918
Leader's seat	Down	Down	Belfast West
Seats won	40	6	6
Popular vote	343,347	104,917	60,577
Percentage	66.9%	20.5%	11.8%
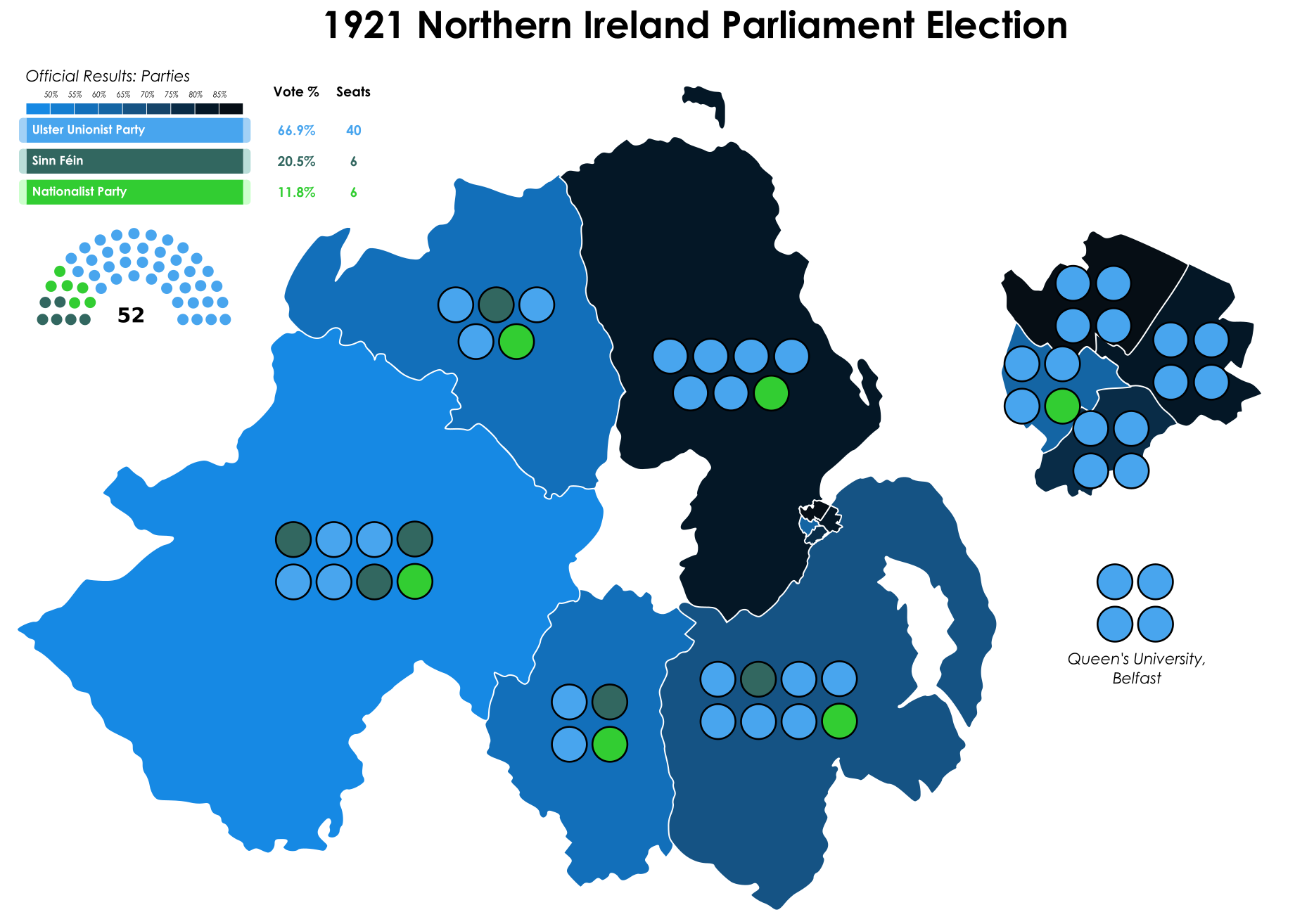
- Results of the 1921 Northern Ireland General Election.
Prime Minister before election
N/A
Prime Minister after election
James Craig
UUP

The 1921 Northern Ireland general election was held on Tuesday, 24 May 1921. It was the first election to the Parliament of Northern Ireland. Ulster Unionist Party members won two-thirds of votes cast and more than three-quarters of the seats in the assembly. Sinn Féin in particular was shocked at the scale of the Unionist victory, having spent considerable resources on the campaign, and had expected to win between 1/3 and 1/2 of the seats. Sinn Féin and Nationalist Party candidates were successful in the joint County Tyrone/Fermanagh constituency with 54.71 percent of the vote. The election was conducted using the single transferable vote system.

The election took place during the Irish War of Independence, on the same day as the election to the parliament of Southern Ireland. As the election in Southern Ireland was merely a formality, with all candidates being returned unopposed (and therefore guaranteeing Sinn Féin complete dominance), Sinn Féin was able to focus its resources entirely on the election in Northern Ireland. The Sinn Féin campaign focused on the issue of partition implemented by the Government of Ireland Act 1920, with Sinn Féin and the Nationalist party running on a combined anti-partition ticket.

== Sinn Féin campaign ==
Sinn Féin invested considerable resources in their campaign, placing advertisements in almost 50 northern newspapers making a range of arguments against partition. Sinn Féin also published its own newspaper, The Unionist, of which 50,000 copies were sent to prominent Protestants in East Ulster, particularly County Antrim. In particular, Sinn Féin claimed there was widespread ignorance over the situation in Ulster and warned against the economic dangers of partition, particularly in relation to threats of a renewed boycott against northern goods in a manner similar to the "Belfast Boycott". Sinn Féin also attempted to attract Ulster's rural and agricultural workers, arguing partition would put them at the mercy of eastern Ulster's urban elites.

Despite the scale and organisation of the campaign, its arguments failed to resonate with voters, with the party's chief organiser Eamon Donnelly claiming on the day of the election that all Sinn Féin's efforts had achieved was assuring a high Unionist turnout. Allegations were made claiming intimidation of Nationalist voters, arrests of candidates/organisers and the seizure of electoral literature.

Sinn Féin treated the two elections north and south as combined elections to the Second Dáil. Five of the six successful Sinn Féin candidates in Northern Ireland were also elected for constituencies in Southern Ireland; Seán O'Mahony was the only Sinn Féin success solely elected in Northern Ireland.

== Results ==
↓
40	6	6
UUP	Sinn Fein	Nationalist

1921 Northern Ireland general election
Party	Candidates						Votes		
Party	Stood	Elected	Gained	Unseated	Net	% of total	%	No.	Net %
UUP	40	40	N/A	N/A	N/A	76.92	66.9	343,347	N/A
Sinn Féin	20	6	N/A	N/A	N/A	11.54	20.5	104,917	N/A
Nationalist	12	6	N/A	N/A	N/A	11.54	11.8	60,577	N/A
Belfast Labour	4	0	N/A	N/A	N/A	0.00	0.6	3,075	N/A
Independent	1	0	N/A	N/A	N/A	0.00	0.2	926	N/A

Total electorate: 582,464; turnout: 88.0% (512,842).

=== Votes summary ===
Popular vote
Ulster Unionist	66.95%
Sinn Féin	20.46%
Nationalist	11.81%
Belfast Labour	0.60%
Independent	0.18%

=== Seats summary ===
Parliamentary seats
Ulster Unionist	76.92%
Sinn Féin	11.54%
Nationalist	11.54%

== See also ==
- List of members of the 1st Parliament of Northern Ireland
