= Irish republican electoral results, Northern Ireland Parliament =

Below are the results of Irish republican parties in elections to the House of Commons of the Parliament of Northern Ireland from its creation in 1921, until its abolition in 1972. Also includes a list of those elected.

Northern Ireland General Election 1921
Party	Candidates						Votes		
Party	Stood	Elected	Gained	Unseated	Net	% of total	%	No.	Net %
Sinn Féin	20	6	N/A	N/A	N/A	11.54	20.5	104,917	N/A

Total electorate: 582,464; turnout: 88.0% (512,842). Elected:

- Armagh – Michael Collins
- Down – Éamon de Valera
- Fermanagh and Tyrone – Arthur Griffith, Seán Milroy, Seán O'Μahony
- Londonderry – Eoin MacNeill

Northern Ireland General Election 1925
Party	Candidates						Votes		
Party	Stood	Elected	Gained	Unseated	Net	% of total	%	No.	Net %
Ind. Republican	6	2	0	4	– 4	3.8	5.3	20,615	-15.2

Electorate 611,683 (512,264 in contested seats); Turnout: 75.1% (384,745). Elected:

- Armagh – Eamon Donnelly
- Down – Éamon de Valera

Northern Ireland General Election 1929
Party	Candidates						Votes		
Party	Stood	Elected	Gained	Unseated	Net	% of total	%	No.	Net %
Nonpartisan	0	0	0	2	– 2	0	0	0	N/A

Northern Ireland General Election 1933
Party	Candidates						Votes		
Party	Stood	Elected	Gained	Unseated	Net	% of total	%	No.	Net %
Ind. Republican	4	1	1	0	+ 1	1.9	7.7	13,106	N/A
Fianna Fáil	1	1	1	0	+ 1	1.9	4.4	7,404	N/A

Electorate 793,952 (250,519 in contested seats); Turnout 67.7% (169,690). Elected:

- South Armagh – Paddy McLogan (Independent Republican)
- South Down – Éamon de Valera (Fianna Fáil)

Northern Ireland General Election 1938
Party	Candidates						Votes		
Party	Stood	Elected	Gained	Unseated	Net	% of total	%	No.	Net %
Nonpartisan	0	0	0	2	– 2	0	0	0	N/A

Northern Ireland General Election 1945
Party	Candidates						Votes		
Party	Stood	Elected	Gained	Unseated	Net	% of total	%	No.	Net %
Socialist Republican	2	1	1	0	+ 1	1.9	1.5	5,497	+1.5

Electorate: 845,964 (509,098 in contested seats); Turnout: 70.3% (357,882). Elected:

- Belfast Falls – Harry Diamond

Northern Ireland General Election 1949
Party	Candidates						Votes		
Party	Stood	Elected	Gained	Unseated	Net	% of total	%	No.	Net %
Socialist Republican	1	1	0	0	0	1.9	0.0	0	-1.5

The only Socialist Republican Party candidate was elected unopposed. Electorate 846,719 (477,354 in contested seats); Turnout 79.3% (378,458).

- Belfast Falls – Harry Diamond

Northern Ireland General Election 1953
Party	Candidates						Votes		
Party	Stood	Elected	Gained	Unseated	Net	% of total	%	No.	Net %
Republican Labour	1	1	1	0	+ 1	1.9	2.3	5,947	N/A

Electorate 888,352 (428,216 in contested seats); Turnout 60.2% (257,924). Elected:

- Belfast Falls – Harry Diamond

Northern Ireland General Election 1958
Party	Candidates						Votes		
Party	Stood	Elected	Gained	Unseated	Net	% of total	%	No.	Net %
Republican Labour	1	1	0	0	0	1.9	3.1	7,510	+0.8

Electorate: 891,064 (359,816 in contested seats); Turnout: 67.1% (241,501). Elected:

- Belfast Falls – Harry Diamond

Northern Ireland General Election 1962
Party	Candidates						Votes		
Party	Stood	Elected	Gained	Unseated	Net	% of total	%	No.	Net %
Republican Labour	1	1	0	0	0	1.9	2.5	7,662	-0.6

Electorate: 903,596 (458,838 in contested seats); Turnout: 66.0% (302,681). Elected:

- Belfast Falls – Harry Diamond

Northern Ireland General Election 1965
Party	Candidates						Votes		
Party	Stood	Elected	Gained	Unseated	Net	% of total	%	No.	Net %
Republican Labour	2	2	1	0	+ 1	3.8	1.0	3,326	-1.5
Ind. Republican	1	0	0	0	0	0	0.2	682	N/A

Electorate: 907,667 (563,252 in contested seats); Turnout: 57.6% (324,589). Elected:

- Belfast Dock – Gerry Fitt
- Belfast Falls – Harry Diamond

Northern Ireland General Election 1969
Party	Candidates						Votes		
Party	Stood	Elected	Gained	Unseated	Net	% of total	%	No.	Net %
Republican Labour	5	2	1	1	0	3.8	2.4	13,115	+1.4

Electorate: 912,087 (778,031 in contested seats); Turnout: 71.9% (559,087). Elected:

- Belfast Dock – Gerry Fitt
- Belfast Central – Paddy Kennedy

== See also ==
- Parliament of Northern Ireland
- House of Commons of Northern Ireland
- Irish Republicanism in Northern Ireland
