= Enniskillen (Northern Ireland Parliament constituency) =

Coordinates: 54.347°N 7.640°W

- Former County constituency for the Parliament of Northern Ireland
- Enniskillen shown within Northern Ireland

Former constituency
- Created: 1929
- Abolished: 1973
- Election method: First past the post

Enniskillen was a constituency of the Parliament of Northern Ireland.

== Boundaries ==
Enniskillen was a county constituency comprising the northern part of County Fermanagh. It was created in 1929, when the House of Commons (Method of Voting and Redistribution of Seats) Act (Northern Ireland) 1929 introduced first-past-the-post elections throughout Northern Ireland. The constituency survived unchanged, returning one member of Parliament until the Parliament of Northern Ireland was temporarily suspended in 1972, and then formally abolished in 1973.

== Politics ==
Enniskillen had a unionist majority, but a substantial nationalist minority. The seat was consistently won by the Ulster Unionist Party (UUP) candidate, and it was only contested on four occasions: in 1938 by an Independent Unionist Association candidate, in 1949 by a Nationalist candidate, in 1965 by a Liberal candidate and in 1969 by both the People's Democracy and an independent Unionist candidate.

== Members of Parliament ==
Elected	Party	Name
1929	UUP	Sir Edward Archdale
1938	UUP	Erne Ferguson
1949	UUP	Thomas Charles Nelson
1954	UUP	Harry West

== Elections ==
At the 1929 and 1933 general elections, Edward Archdale was elected unopposed.

General Election 9 February 1938: Enniskillen
Party	Candidate	Votes	%	±%
UUP	Erne Ferguson	5,679	55.9	N/A
Ind. Unionist Party	W. Clarke	4,485	44.1	New
Majority		1,194	11.8	N/A
Turnout		10,164	86.4	N/A
UUP hold		Swing	N/A	

At the 1945 Northern Ireland general election, Erne Ferguson was elected unopposed.

General Election 10 February 1949: Enniskillen
Party	Candidate	Votes	%	±%
UUP	Erne Ferguson	5,706	54.7	N/A
Nationalist	W. Blake	4,729	45.3	New
Majority		977	9.4	N/A
Turnout		10,435	85.7	N/A
UUP hold		Swing	N/A	

At the 1949 Enniskillen by-election and the 1953 Northern Ireland general election, Thomas Charles Nelson was elected unopposed.

At the 1954 Enniskillen by-election and the 1958 and 1962 general elections, Harry West was elected unopposed.

General Election 25 November 1965: Enniskillen
Party	Candidate	Votes	%	±%
UUP	Harry West	5,982	66.3	N/A
Ulster Liberal	Albert McElroy	3,042	33.7	New
Majority		2,940	32.6	N/A
Turnout		9,024	74.9	N/A
UUP hold		Swing	N/A	

General Election 24 February 1969: Enniskillen
Party	Candidate	Votes	%	±%
UUP	Harry West	4,891	48.5	−17.8
People's Democracy	M. Bowes-Egan	2,784	27.6	New
Ind. Unionist	D. T. Archdale	2,418	23.9	New
Majority		2,107	20.9	–11.7
Turnout		10,093	86.3	+11.4
UUP hold		Swing		

- Parliament prorogued 30 March 1972 and abolished 18 July 1973
