= Belfast Falls (Northern Ireland Parliament constituency) =

Constituency of the Parliament of Northern Ireland

Coordinates: 54.592°N 5.963°W

- Former Borough constituency for the Parliament of Northern Ireland
- Belfast Falls shown within Belfast and Belfast shown within Northern Ireland

Former constituency
- Created: 1929
- Abolished: 1973
- Election method: First past the post

Belfast Falls was a constituency of the Parliament of Northern Ireland.

== Boundaries ==
Belfast Falls was a borough constituency comprising part of western Belfast. It was created in 1929, when the House of Commons (Method of Voting and Redistribution of Seats) Act (Northern Ireland) 1929 introduced first-past-the-post elections throughout Northern Ireland.

Belfast Falls was created by the division of Belfast West into four new constituencies. It was formed from the Falls ward and included the Falls Road. It survived unchanged, returning one member of Parliament, until the Parliament of Northern Ireland was temporarily suspended in 1972, and then formally abolished in 1973.

== Politics ==
The constituency was the most staunchly nationalist in Belfast. It was initially held by Nationalist Party members, then later by a variety of labour movement activists and members of smaller nationalist parties.

== Members of Parliament ==
Election	Member	Party
1929	Richard Byrne	Nationalist Party
1933	Richard Byrne	Nationalist Party
1938	Richard Byrne	Nationalist Party
1942	Eamon Donnelly	Independent Republican
1945	Harry Diamond	Socialist Republican Party
1949	Harry Diamond	Socialist Republican Party
1953	Harry Diamond	Socialist Republican Party
1958	Harry Diamond	Republican Labour Party
1962	Harry Diamond	Republican Labour Party
1965	Harry Diamond	Republican Labour Party
1969	Paddy Devlin	Northern Ireland Labour Party
1970	Paddy Devlin	Social Democratic and Labour Party
1973	Constituency abolished	

== Election results ==
General Election 22 May 1929: Belfast Falls
Party	Candidate	Votes	%	±%
Nationalist	Richard Byrne	6,941	55.8	
NI Labour	Billy McMullen	5,509	44.2	
Majority		1,432	11.6	
Turnout		12,450		
Nationalist win (new seat)				

General Election 30 November 1933: Belfast Falls
Party	Candidate	Votes	%	±%
Nationalist	Richard Byrne	Unopposed	N/A	N/A
Nationalist hold		Swing	N/A	

General Election 9 February 1938: Belfast Falls
Party	Candidate	Votes	%	±%
Nationalist	Richard Byrne	5,334	53.3	N/A
NI Labour	John Glass	4,667	46.7	New
Majority		667	6.6	N/A
Turnout		10,001		
Nationalist hold		Swing	N/A	

- Death of Byrne

By-election 2 April 1942: Belfast Falls
Party	Candidate	Votes	%	±%
Ind. Republican	Eamon Donnelly	4,595	54.8	New
Nationalist	George McGouran	1,971	23.5	−29.8
NI Labour	John Glass	1,821	21.7	−25.0
Majority		2,623	31.3	N/A
Turnout		8,387		
Ind. Republican gain from Nationalist		Swing		

General Election 14 June 1945: Belfast Falls
Party	Candidate	Votes	%	±%
Socialist Republican	Harry Diamond	5,016	42.9	New
Federation of Labour	John Collins	3,912	33.5	New
Nationalist	James McGlade	2,766	23.6	+0.1
Majority		1,104	9.4	N/A
Turnout		11,694		
Socialist Republican gain from Ind. Republican		Swing		

General Election 10 February 1949: Belfast Falls
Party	Candidate	Votes	%	±%
Socialist Republican	Harry Diamond	Unopposed	N/A	N/A
Socialist Republican hold		Swing	N/A	

General Election 22 October 1953: Belfast Falls
Party	Candidate	Votes	%	±%
Republican Labour	Harry Diamond	7,510	73.1	N/A
Independent Irish Labour	Seamus MacKearney	2,761	26.9	New
Irish Labour	Jack MacGougan	1,361	11.8	New
Majority		4,749	46.2	N/A
Turnout		11,632		
Republican Labour gain from Socialist Republican		Swing	N/A	

General Election 20 March 1958: Belfast Falls
Party	Candidate	Votes	%	±%
Republican Labour	Harry Diamond	7,510	73.1	0.0
Independent Irish Labour	Seamus MacKearney	2,761	26.9	0.0
Majority		4,749	46.2	0.0
Turnout		10,271		
Republican Labour hold		Swing		

General Election 31 May 1962: Belfast Falls
Party	Candidate	Votes	%	±%
Republican Labour	Harry Diamond	7,662	76.6	+3.5
Ind. Labour Group	John Joseph Brennan	2,343	23.4	New
Majority		5,319	53.2	+7.0
Turnout		10,005		
Republican Labour hold		Swing		

General Election 25 November 1965: Belfast Falls
Party	Candidate	Votes	%	±%
Republican Labour	Harry Diamond	Unopposed	N/A	N/A
Republican Labour hold		Swing	N/A	

General Election 24 February 1969: Belfast Falls
Party	Candidate	Votes	%	±%
NI Labour	Paddy Devlin	6,275	53.1	New
Republican Labour	Harry Diamond	5,549	46.9	N/A
Majority		726	6.2	N/A
Turnout		11,824		N/A
NI Labour gain from Republican Labour		Swing	N/A	
