= Belfast Clifton (Northern Ireland Parliament constituency) =

Constituency of the Parliament of Northern Ireland

Coordinates: 54.611°N 5.935°W

- Former Borough constituency for the Parliament of Northern Ireland
- Belfast shown within Northern Ireland

Former constituency
- Created: 1929
- Abolished: 1973
- Election method: First past the post

Belfast Clifton was a constituency of the Parliament of Northern Ireland.

== Boundaries ==
Belfast Clifton was a borough constituency comprising part of northern Belfast. It was created in 1929 when the House of Commons (Method of Voting and Redistribution of Seats) Act (Northern Ireland) 1929 introduced first-past-the-post elections throughout Northern Ireland.

Belfast Clifton was created by the division of Belfast North into four new constituencies. It survived unchanged, returning one member of Parliament, until the Parliament of Northern Ireland was temporarily suspended in 1972, and then formally abolished in 1973.

== Politics ==
In common with other seats in North Belfast, the seat had little nationalist presence. The seat was usually held by the Ulster Unionist Party, but a variety of independent Unionists contested it and occasionally won, and some labour movement candidates achieved strong results.

== Members of Parliament ==
Election	Member	Party
1929	Samuel Hall-Thompson	Ulster Unionist Party
1953	Norman Porter	Independent Unionist
1958	Robin Kinahan	Ulster Unionist Party
1959(b)	William James Morgan	Ulster Unionist Party
1969	Lloyd Hall-Thompson	Independent Unionist
1973	Constituency abolished	

== Election results ==
At the 1929 and 1933 Northern Ireland general elections, Samuel Hall-Thompson was elected unopposed.

General Election 1938: Belfast Clifton
Party	Candidate	Votes	%	±%
UUP	Samuel Hall-Thompson	6,683	54.4	N/A
Ind. Unionist Party	William McConnell Wilton	5,600	45.6	New
Majority		1,083	8.8	N/A
Turnout		12,283	72.1	N/A
UUP hold		Swing	N/A	

General Election 1945: Belfast Clifton
Party	Candidate	Votes	%	±%
UUP	Samuel Hall-Thompson	7,272	62.0	+7.6
NI Labour	Andrew Carlin	4,458	38.0	New
Majority		2,814	24.0	+15.2
Turnout		11,730	67.2	−4.9
UUP hold		Swing		

General Election 1949: Belfast Clifton
Party	Candidate	Votes	%	±%
UUP	Samuel Hall-Thompson	10,715	83.6	+21.6
Independent Labour	Owen J. Keane	2,107	16.4	New
Majority		8,608	67.2	+43.2
Turnout		12,822	73.0	+5.8
UUP hold		Swing		

General Election 1953: Belfast Clifton
Party	Candidate	Votes	%	±%
Ind. Unionist	Norman Porter	4,747	51.9	New
UUP	Samuel Hall-Thompson	4,402	48.1	−35.5
Majority		345	3.8	N/A
Turnout		9,149	50.9	−22.1
Ind. Unionist gain from UUP		Swing		

General Election 1958: Belfast Clifton
Party	Candidate	Votes	%	±%
UUP	Robin Kinahan	5,755	50.2	+2.1
Ind. Unionist	Norman Porter	5,710	49.8	−2.1
Majority		45	0.4	N/A
Turnout		11,465	67.5	+16.6
UUP gain from Ind. Unionist		Swing		

Belfast Clifton by-election, 1959
Party	Candidate	Votes	%	±%
UUP	William James Morgan	5,212	50.2	0.0
Ind. Unionist	Norman Porter	3,978	38.4	−11.4
NI Labour	Victoria Dunlop	1,185	11.4	New
Majority		1,234	11.8	+11.4
Turnout		10,375	61.1	−6.4
UUP hold		Swing		

General Election 1962: Belfast Clifton
Party	Candidate	Votes	%	±%
UUP	William James Morgan	6,474	58.6	+8.4
NI Labour	Norman Thompson	4,571	41.4	N/A
Majority		1,903	17.2	+16.8
Turnout		11,045	66.9	−0.6
UUP hold		Swing		

General Election 1965: Belfast Clifton
Party	Candidate	Votes	%	±%
UUP	William James Morgan	6,083	65.2	+6.6
NI Labour	Norman Thompson	3,247	34.8	−6.6
Majority		2,836	30.4	+13.2
Turnout		9,330	57.5	−9.4
UUP hold		Swing		

General Election 1969: Belfast Clifton
Party	Candidate	Votes	%	±%
Unofficial Unionist	Lloyd Hall-Thompson	6,066	50.4	New
UUP	William James Morgan	3,215	26.7	−38.5
NI Labour	Norman Thompson	1,681	13.9	−20.9
National Democratic	Michael McKeown	1,079	9.0	New
Majority		2,851	23.7	N/A
Turnout		12,041	74.3	+15.8
Unofficial Unionist gain from UUP		Swing		
