= 1955 Belfast Corporation election =

1955 UK local government election

Map of results by ward.

Elections to Belfast Corporation were held on 18 May 1955, alongside elections to Northern Ireland's other municipal councils. The Ulster Unionists maintained their dominance of the 60-seat corporation, gaining 3 seats to bring their total number of seats to 50.

== Council results ==
Belfast Corporation election, 1955 Total vote: 194,838
Party	Seats	Gains	Losses	Net gain/loss	Seats %	Votes %	Votes	+/−
UUP	50	3		▲3	91.67	76.19	148,446	
Irish Labour	8				13.33	0.28	551	
NI Labour	1				1.67	12.65	24,656	
Ind. Unionist	1				1.67	6.64	12,931	
Dock Labour Party	0	0	2	▼2	0.00	3.63	7,063	
Communist (NI)	0				0.00	0.61	1,191	

== Ward results ==
=== Clifton Ward ===
==== Alderman ====
Clifton Ward 1 Alderman Electorate: 21,839
Party	Candidate	Votes	%	±%
UUP	R. G. C. Kinahan (incumbent Alderman)	6,339		
NI Labour	W. Harris	1,732		
Majority		4,607		
Turnout				

==== Councillors ====
Clifton Ward 3 Councillors Electorate: 21,839 Spoiled papers: 349
Party	Candidate	Votes	%	±%
UUP	J. F. Cairns (incumbent)	5,959		
UUP	F. R. A. Hynds	5,929		
UUP	F. W. Watson	5,823		
NI Labour	W. J. Blease	1,774		
NI Labour	R. R. Hanna	1,735		
NI Labour	T. G. Kitchen	1,400		
Communist (NI)	Betty Sinclair	503		
Turnout		8,456	38.7%	

=== Court Ward ===
==== Councillors ====
Court Ward 3 Councillors Electorate: 5,938
Party	Candidate	Votes	%	±%
UUP	J. D. Barbour	1,708		
UUP	S. H. Walsh (incumbent)	1,677		
NI Labour	W. R. Boyd	1,299		
NI Labour	C. Scott (incumbent)	1,107		
Ind. Unionist	T. Meekin (incumbent)	1,054		
Ind. Unionist	B. Horan	579		
Irish Labour	E. Carlin	551		
Turnout		3,778	63.62%	

=== Cromac Ward ===
==== Councillors ====
Cromac Ward 3 Councillors Electorate: 9,949
Party	Candidate	Votes	%	±%
UUP	S. K. Henry (incumbent)	2,827		
UUP	T. Rea (incumbent)	2,787		
UUP	W. J. Lawther (incumbent)	2,767		
NI Labour	W. J. Alexander	507		
Turnout		3,287	33%	

=== Dock Ward ===
==== Alderman ====
Dock Ward 1 Alderman Electorate: 5,773
Party	Candidate	Votes	%	±%
UUP	William Oliver (incumbent Alderman)	2,276	55.65	
Dock Labour Party	P. Kelly	1,814	44.35	
Majority		462	11.30	
Turnout		4,090	70.85	

==== Councillors ====
Dock Ward 3 Councillors Electorate: 16,510
Party	Candidate	Votes	%	±%
UUP	W. Atcheson	2,203		
UUP	Dorothy Williamson (incumbent)	2,202		
UUP	J. Cardwell	2,196		
Dock Labour Party	M. Ferran (incumbent)	1,782		
Dock Labour Party	Gerry Fitt	1,735		
Dock Labour Party	J. A. Toner	1,732		
Turnout		4,186	72.51%	

=== Duncairn Ward ===
==== Alderman ====
Duncairn Ward 1 Alderman Electorate: 16,823
Party	Candidate	Votes	%	±%
UUP	S. W. Neill (incumbent Alderman)	5,069		
NI Labour	T. Williamson	1,178		
Majority		3,891		
Turnout				

==== Councillors ====
Duncairn Ward 3 Councillors Electorate: 16,823
Party	Candidate	Votes	%	±%
UUP	W. D. Geddis (incumbent)	5,124		
UUP	J. W. Lindsay (incumbent)	5,092		
UUP	J. L. Cunningham (incumbent)	4,956		
NI Labour	Bessie McKeown	1,260		
Turnout			%	

=== Falls Ward ===
==== Alderman ====
Falls Ward 1 Alderman Electorate:
Party	Candidate	Votes	%	±%
Irish Labour	J. McKearney	Unopposed		

==== Councillors ====
Falls Ward 3 Councillors Electorate:
Party	Candidate	Votes	%	±%
Irish Labour	Jack Macgougan	Unopposed		
Irish Labour	J. G. McAllister	Unopposed		
Irish Labour	F. C. Hughes	Unopposed		
Turnout				

=== Ormeau Ward ===
==== Councillors ====
Cromac Ward 3 Councillors Electorate: 21,653 Spoiled papers: 53
Party	Candidate	Votes	%	±%
UUP	W. S. Hinds	5,948		
UUP	Irene McAlery (incumbent)	5,921		
UUP	T. McMullan (incumbent)	5,855		
NI Labour	A. Holmes	1,336		
NI Labour	N. Searight	1,213		
NI Labour	C. Allen	1,190		
Turnout		7,455	34.4%	

=== Pottinger Ward ===
==== Councillors ====
Pottinger Ward 3 Councillors Electorate: 20,774 Spoiled papers: 85
Party	Candidate	Votes	%	±%
UUP	G. Kelso (incumbent)	4,982		
UUP	J. C. McIntyre	4,946		
UUP	A. E. Quinn	4,705		
Communist (NI)	Andy Barr	688		
Turnout		5,785	27.8%	

=== Shankill Ward ===
==== Alderman ====
Shankill Ward 1 Alderman Electorate: 15,194
Party	Candidate	Votes	%	±%
Ind. Unionist	T. G. Henderson (incumbent Alderman)	4,649		
NI Labour	S. Cree	1,379		
Majority		3,270		
Turnout				

==== Councillors ====
Shankill Ward 3 Councillors Electorate: 15,194 Spoiled papers: 1,388
Party	Candidate	Votes	%	±%
UUP	R. Armstrong	4,755		
UUP	J. Ross (incumbent)	4,541		
UUP	Sir James Norritt (incumbent)	4,524		
NI Labour	J. McAllister	1,763		
NI Labour	I. Johnston	1,744		
Turnout		6,959	45.2	

=== Smithfield Ward ===
==== Alderman ====
Smithfield Ward 1 Alderman Electorate:
Party	Candidate	Votes	%	±%
Irish Labour	Jack Beattie	Unopposed		

==== Councillors ====
Smithfield Ward 3 Councillors Electorate:
Party	Candidate	Votes	%	±%
Irish Labour	D. P. Marrinan	Unopposed		
Irish Labour	T. Carragher	Unopposed		
Irish Labour	B. Murray	Unopposed		
Turnout				

=== St Anne's Ward ===
==== Alderman ====
St Anne's Ward 1 Alderman Electorate:
Party	Candidate	Votes	%	±%
UUP	William Cecil McKee	Unopposed		

==== Councillors ====
St Anne's Ward 3 Councillors Electorate:
Party	Candidate	Votes	%	±%
UUP	Florence E. Breakie	Unopposed		
UUP	J. D. E. Cheyne	Unopposed		
UUP	J. S. R. Harcourt	Unopposed		
Turnout				

=== St George's Ward ===
==== Councillors ====
St George's Ward 3 Councillors Electorate: 5,593 Spoiled papers: 27
Party	Candidate	Votes	%	±%
UUP	J. G. Armstrong (incumbent)	1,988		
UUP	Mrs E. Armstrong	1,865		
UUP	J. R. McClurg	1,850		
Ind. Unionist	A. H. Duff (incumbent)	1,599		
NI Labour	J. E. Gilmore	588		
Turnout		3,433	61.1%	

=== Victoria Ward ===
==== Alderman ====
Victoria Ward 1 Alderman Electorate: 16,510
Party	Candidate	Votes	%	±%
UUP	T. L. Cole; Alderman	Unopposed as Alderman		

==== Councillors ====
Victoria Ward 3 Councillors Electorate: 16,510
Party	Candidate	Votes	%	±%
UUP	H. Jefferson	5,209		
UUP	H. Fair	5,063		
UUP	W. J. McCracken	5,022		
NI Labour	W. D. Purdy	1,815		
NI Labour	Victoria Dunlop	1,697		
NI Labour	G. Hooley	1,671		
Turnout		7,118	43.11	

=== Windsor ===
==== Alderman ====
Windsor Ward 1 Alderman Electorate:
Party	Candidate	Votes	%	±%
UUP	A. Scott	Unopposed		

==== Councillors ====
Windsor Ward 3 Councillors Electorate:
Party	Candidate	Votes	%	±%
UUP	M. Wallace	Unopposed		
UUP	J. Dixon	Unopposed		
UUP	H. V. Kirk	Unopposed		
Turnout				

=== Woodvale Ward ===
==== Alderman ====
Woodvale Ward 1 Alderman Electorate: 11,133
Party	Candidate	Votes	%	±%
UUP	Hilda Wilson (incumbent Alderman)	3,018		
Ind. Unionist	N. Porter	2,533		
Majority		485		
Turnout				

==== Councillors ====
Woodvale Ward 3 Councillors Electorate: 11,133 Spoiled papers: 332
Party	Candidate	Votes	%	±%
UUP	A. F. Wilson	3,180		
UUP	A. T. Hill	2,864		
UUP	W. Boucher	2,627		
Ind. Unionist	W. M. Wilton	2,475		
Ind. Unionist	W. S. McVea	2,382		
Ind. Unionist	A. Miller	2,309		
Turnout		6,023	54%	
