= Belfast Shankill (Northern Ireland Parliament constituency) =

Constituency of the Parliament of Northern Ireland

Coordinates: 54.604°N 5.950°W

- Former Borough constituency for the Parliament of Northern Ireland
- Belfast shown within Northern Ireland

Former constituency
- Created: 1929
- Abolished: 1973
- Election method: First past the post

Belfast Shankill was a constituency of the Parliament of Northern Ireland.

== Boundaries ==
Belfast Shankill was a borough constituency comprising part of northern Belfast. It was created in 1929 when the House of Commons (Method of Voting and Redistribution of Seats) Act (Northern Ireland) 1929 introduced first-past-the-post elections throughout Northern Ireland.

Belfast Shankill was created by the division of Belfast North into four new constituencies. It survived unchanged, returning one member of Parliament, until the Parliament of Northern Ireland was temporarily suspended in 1972, and then formally abolished in 1973.

== Politics ==
In common with other seats in North Belfast, the seat had little nationalist presence. The seat was strongly Unionist, but there was some labour movement strength. For the first twenty-four years of its existence, the seat was held by an independent Unionist.

== Members of Parliament ==
Election	Member	Party
1929	Tommy Henderson	Independent Unionist
1937	Tommy Henderson	Independent Unionist Association
1940s	Tommy Henderson	Independent Unionist
1953	Henry Holmes	Ulster Unionist
1960	Desmond Boal	Ulster Unionist
1961	Desmond Boal	Independent Unionist
1961	Desmond Boal	Ulster Unionist
1970	Desmond Boal	Independent Unionist
1971	Desmond Boal	Democratic Unionist
1973	constituency abolished	

== Election results ==
General Election 1929: Belfast Shankill
Party	Candidate	Votes	%	±%
Ind. Unionist	Tommy Henderson	6,525	51.1	
UUP	Samuel McGuffin	6,244	48.9	
Majority		281	2.2	
Turnout		12,769	74.8	
Ind. Unionist win (new seat)				

General Election 1933: Belfast Shankill
Party	Candidate	Votes	%	±%
Ind. Unionist	Tommy Henderson	6,451	50.5	−0.6
UUP	James Norman Fulton	6,335	49.5	+0.6
Majority		116	1.0	−1.2
Turnout		12,786	76.4	+1.6
Ind. Unionist hold		Swing		

General Election 1938: Belfast Shankill
Party	Candidate	Votes	%	±%
Ind. Unionist Party	Tommy Henderson	7,518	51.4	+0.9
UUP	James Norman Fulton	7,095	48.6	−0.9
Majority		423	2.8	N/A
Turnout		14,613	83.6	+7.2
Ind. Unionist Party gain from Ind. Unionist		Swing		

At the 1945 and 1949 general elections, Tommy Henderson was elected unopposed.

General Election 1953: Belfast Shankill
Party	Candidate	Votes	%	±%
UUP	Henry Holmes	5,485	47.3	N/A
Ind. Unionist	Tommy Henderson	3,215	27.7	N/A
NI Labour	Norman Branagh Fullerton	2,897	25.0	New
Majority		2,270	19.6	N/A
Turnout		11,597	65.6	N/A
UUP gain from Ind. Unionist		Swing	N/A	

General Election 1958: Belfast Shankill
Party	Candidate	Votes	%	±%
UUP	Henry Holmes	6,411	56.2	+8.9
NI Labour	Samuel Cree	4,995	43.8	+18.8
Majority		1,416	12.4	−7.2
Turnout		11,406	61.5	−4.1
UUP hold		Swing		

1960 Belfast Shankill by-election
Party	Candidate	Votes	%	±%
UUP	Desmond Boal	4,320	64.2	+8.0
NI Labour	Samuel Cree	2,414	35.8	−8.0
Majority		1,906	28.4	+16.0
Turnout		6,734	28.4	−33.1
UUP hold		Swing		

At the 1962 Northern Ireland general election, Desmond Boal was elected unopposed.

General Election 1965: Belfast Shankill
Party	Candidate	Votes	%	±%
UUP	Desmond Boal	6,289	67.4	N/A
NI Labour	David Overend	3,035	32.6	New
Majority		3,254	34.8	N/A
Turnout		9,324	50.5	N/A
UUP hold		Swing	N/A	

General Election 1969: Belfast Shankill
Party	Candidate	Votes	%	±%
UUP	Desmond Boal	6,384	49.4	−18.0
Ind. Unionist	Samuel Walsh	4,545	35.2	New
NI Labour	David Overend	1,997	15.4	−17.2
Majority		1,839	14.2	−20.6
Turnout		12,926	71.1	+20.6
UUP hold		Swing		
