= Frank Hanna (politician) =

Northern Irish politician (1914–1987)

Member of the House of Commons of Northern Ireland for Belfast Central
- In office 1946–1965

Personal details
- Born: Francis Hanna; 1914 Ireland
- Died: 21 November 1987 (aged 72–73)
- Party: Northern Ireland Labour Party
- Children: Vincent Hanna
- Occupation: Politician, solicitor

Francis "Frank" Hanna (1914 – 21 November 1987) was an Irish politician.

After studying at St. Mary's Christian Brothers' Grammar School, Belfast and Queen's University, Belfast, Hanna became a solicitor, founding Francis Hanna and Co., specialising in personal injuries and trade union cases. A Roman Catholic supportive of a united Ireland, Hanna joined the Nationalist Party and was elected to Belfast City Council.

In 1942, he joined James Collins in defecting to the Northern Ireland Labour Party (NILP), and in a 1946 by-election, he was elected for Belfast Central. Hanna beat Victor Halley of the Socialist Republican Party at the election; the Nationalist Party which had held the seat for many years choosing not to stand.

In 1949, Hanna resigned from the NILP in protest at its support for the partition of Ireland. He was re-elected unopposed as an "Independent Labour" candidate at the 1949 Northern Ireland general election, and shortly afterwards became the vice-chairman of the new Northern Section of the Irish Labour Party. He resigned from the party soon afterwards. In 1958, he set up his own Independent Labour Group, with support from various Catholic clerics. In 1964, he was one of the original supporters of Unity, but he stood down at the 1965 Northern Ireland general election.

He was the father of the Irish political journalist Vincent Hanna.

Parliament of Northern Ireland
Preceded by Thomas Joseph Campbell	Member of Parliament for Belfast Central; 1946–1965	Succeeded by John Joseph Brennan
