= John Joseph Brennan =

Northern Irish politician (1913–1976)

John Joseph Brennan (1913 – 1976) was a Northern Irish politician. He stood for the British House of Commons in Belfast West at the 1959 United Kingdom general election, representing the Independent Labour Group, receiving 37.6% of the vote.

In 1962, he stood for the Belfast Falls constituency at the 1962 Northern Ireland election, before becoming a founder member of the National Democratic Party.

Under the National Democratic banner, Brennan won Belfast Central at the 1965 Northern Ireland election without facing an opponent – the only member of that party to win election at this level.

However, at the 1969 Northern Ireland election, he was defeated by Paddy Kennedy of the Republican Labour Party.

Parliament of Northern Ireland
Preceded by Francis Hanna	Member of Parliament for Belfast Central; 1965–1969	Succeeded by Paddy Kennedy
