= Samuel Rodgers =

Politician from Northern Ireland

Samuel Rodgers (1894 – June 1970) was a unionist politician in Northern Ireland.

Rodgers qualified as a medical doctor at Queen's University Belfast in 1926. During World War II, he served with the Royal Army Medical Corps. He joined the Ulster Unionist Party, and stood unsuccessfully for them in Belfast Pottinger at the 1945 Northern Ireland general election. However, he managed to take the seat at the next election, in 1949.

Rodgers held his seat in 1953, and chaired the Unionist backbenchers' committee from 1956 until 1958, when he lost his seat. He stood for Queen's University Belfast in a 1961 by-election, but was again unsuccessful. He was elected to the Senate of Northern Ireland the following year, serving until his death.

Parliament of Northern Ireland
Preceded by Jack Beattie	Member of Parliament for Belfast Pottinger; 1949–1958	Succeeded by Tom Boyd
