= Murtagh Morgan =

Murtagh Morgan (1906–1985) was a trade unionist and Irish republican politician.

Morgan lived in Belfast and had a Roman Catholic background. In the 1920s, he became a republican labour activist in the Northern Ireland Labour Party (NILP), claiming to act in the spirit of James Connolly. By 1925, he had become the President of the Belfast section of the Irish Transport and General Workers' Union. By the 1930s, he was Chairman of the union, and was active on Belfast Trades Council. He supported the Republican Congress initiative, started in 1934. During this period, he was close to the Socialist Party of Northern Ireland faction of the NILP.

At some point Morgan left the NILP, and at the 1953 Northern Ireland general election, he was elected as the Irish Labour Party MP for Belfast Dock. He stood down at the 1958 general election, and Gerry Fitt stood as the group's candidate.

Morgan nominated Albert Price as in independent Irish republican candidate for Belfast West at the February 1974 general election He was also named as a possible Republican Labour Party candidate in Belfast North, but in the event the party disbanded and did not stand any candidates.

Parliament of Northern Ireland
Preceded by Thomas Loftus Cole	Member of Parliament for Belfast Dock; 1953–1958	Succeeded by William Oliver
