= Hugh Downey =

Northern Irish politician

Hugh Downey was a politician in Northern Ireland.

Downey was a Roman Catholic and worked as a barman. He joined the Northern Ireland Labour Party and by 1942 was its vice-chairman.

At the 1945 Northern Ireland general election, Downey was elected for Belfast Dock, defeating sitting Ulster Unionist Party member George Anthony Clark. Downey lost the seat at the 1949 general election.

Downey's nephew Danny Morrison later became a prominent member of Sinn Féin.

Parliament of Northern Ireland
Preceded by George Anthony Clark	Member of Parliament for Belfast Dock; 1945–1949	Succeeded by Thomas Loftus Cole
