= Belfast Dock (Northern Ireland Parliament constituency) =

Constituency of the Parliament of Northern Ireland

Coordinates: 54.613°N 5.929°W

- Former Borough constituency for the Parliament of Northern Ireland
- Belfast Dock shown within Belfast and Belfast shown within Northern Ireland

Former constituency
- Created: 1929
- Abolished: 1973
- Election method: First past the post

Belfast Dock was a constituency of the Parliament of Northern Ireland.

== Boundaries ==
Belfast Dock was a borough constituency comprising part of northern Belfast. It was created in 1929 when the House of Commons (Method of Voting and Redistribution of Seats) Act (Northern Ireland) 1929 introduced first-past-the-post elections throughout Northern Ireland.

Belfast Dock was created by the division of Belfast East into four new constituencies. It survived unchanged, returning one member of Parliament, until the Parliament of Northern Ireland was temporarily suspended in 1972, and then formally abolished in 1973.

The boundaries were the same as the former Dock ward. This meant that the boundary ran from Carlisle Circus, along Clifton Street, up North Queen Street, along Great George's Street, along the Belfast Lough, along Brougham Street and Duncairn Gardens and from the top of Duncairn Gardens, along the Antrim Road to Carlisle Circus. Consequently, the constituency was almost identical to the current New Lodge ward.

The constituency is now part of Belfast North.

== Politics ==
The constituency was one of the most marginal in the Northern Ireland Parliament changing hands at every election until 1965. In every election from 1933 to 1965 the incumbent member lost his seat.

== Members of Parliament ==
| Election | Member | Party |
|---|---|---|
| 1929 | Charles Blakiston-Houston | Ulster Unionist Party |
| 1933 | Harry Midgley | Northern Ireland Labour Party |
| 1938 | George Anthony Clark | Ulster Unionist Party |
| 1945 | Hugh Downey | Northern Ireland Labour Party |
| 1949 | Thomas Loftus Cole | Ulster Unionist Party |
| 1953 | Murtagh Morgan | Irish Labour Party |
| 1958 | William Oliver | Ulster Unionist Party |
| 1962 | Gerry Fitt | Irish Labour Party |
| 1965 | Gerry Fitt | Republican Labour Party |
| 1970 | Gerry Fitt | Social Democratic and Labour Party |
| 1973 | Constituency abolished | |

== Elections results ==
General Election 22 May 1929: Belfast Dock
| Party | Candidate | Votes | % | ±% |
|---|---|---|---|---|
| UUP | Charles Blakiston-Houston | 4,035 | 46.6 | |
| NI Labour | Dawson Gordon | 3,003 | 34.7 | |
| Ind. Unionist | James Woods Gyle | 1,619 | 18.7 | |
| Majority | | 1,032 | 11.9 | |
| Turnout | | 8,657 | 73.7 | |
| UUP win (new seat) | | | | |

General Election 30 November 1933: Belfast Dock
| Party | Candidate | Votes | % | ±% |
|---|---|---|---|---|
| NI Labour | Harry Midgley | 4,893 | 57.0 | +22.3 |
| UUP | Charles Blakiston-Houston | 3,685 | 43.0 | −3.6 |
| Majority | | 1,208 | 14.0 | N/A |
| Turnout | | 8,578 | 77.5 | +3.8 |
| NI Labour gain from UUP | | Swing | | |

General Election 9 February 1938: Belfast Dock
| Party | Candidate | Votes | % | ±% |
|---|---|---|---|---|
| UUP | George Anthony Clark | 3,578 | 42.6 | −0.4 |
| Nationalist | James Collins | 2,891 | 34.5 | New |
| NI Labour | Harry Midgley | 1,943 | 22.9 | −34.1 |
| Majority | | 687 | 8.1 | N/A |
| Turnout | | 8,412 | 82.5 | +5.0 |
| UUP gain from NI Labour | | Swing | | |

General Election 14 June 1945: Belfast Dock
| Party | Candidate | Votes | % | ±% |
|---|---|---|---|---|
| NI Labour | Hugh Downey | 3,985 | 57.7 | +34.8 |
| UUP | George Anthony Clark | 2,924 | 42.3 | −0.3 |
| Majority | | 1,061 | 15.4 | N/A |
| Turnout | | 6,909 | 78.5 | −4.0 |
| NI Labour gain from UUP | | Swing | | |

General Election 10 February 1949: Belfast Dock
| Party | Candidate | Votes | % | ±% |
|---|---|---|---|---|
| UUP | Thomas Loftus Cole | 3,674 | 52.0 | +9.7 |
| NI Labour | Hugh Downey | 3,390 | 48.0 | −9.7 |
| Majority | | 284 | 4.0 | N/A |
| Turnout | | 7,064 | 79.8 | +1.3 |
| UUP gain from NI Labour | | Swing | | |

General Election 22 October 1953: Belfast Dock
| Party | Candidate | Votes | % | ±% |
|---|---|---|---|---|
| Irish Labour | Murtagh Morgan | 3,537 | 51.3 | New |
| UUP | Thomas Loftus Cole | 3,358 | 48.7 | −3.3 |
| Majority | | 179 | 2.6 | N/A |
| Turnout | | 6,895 | 75.9 | −3.9 |
| Irish Labour gain from UUP | | Swing | | |

General Election 20 March 1958: Belfast Dock
| Party | Candidate | Votes | % | ±% |
|---|---|---|---|---|
| UUP | William Oliver | 3,156 | 52.1 | +3.4 |
| Irish Labour | Gerry Fitt | 2,900 | 47.9 | −3.4 |
| Majority | | 256 | 4.2 | N/A |
| Turnout | | 6,056 | 73.9 | −2.0 |
| UUP gain from Irish Labour | | Swing | | |

General Election 31 May 1962: Belfast Dock
| Party | Candidate | Votes | % | ±% |
|---|---|---|---|---|
| Irish Labour | Gerry Fitt | 3,288 | 54.2 | +6.3 |
| UUP | William Oliver | 2,781 | 45.8 | −6.3 |
| Majority | | 507 | 8.4 | N/A |
| Turnout | | 6,069 | 77.9 | +4.0 |
| Irish Labour gain from UUP | | Swing | | |

General Election 25 November 1965: Belfast Dock
| Party | Candidate | Votes | % | ±% |
|---|---|---|---|---|
| Republican Labour | Gerry Fitt | 3,326 | 62.3 | +8.1 |
| UUP | William Oliver | 2,016 | 37.7 | −8.1 |
| Majority | | 1,310 | 24.6 | N/A |
| Turnout | | 5,342 | 70.3 | −7.6 |
| Republican Labour gain from Irish Labour | | Swing | | |

General Election 24 February 1969: Belfast Dock
| Party | Candidate | Votes | % | ±% |
|---|---|---|---|---|
| Republican Labour | Gerry Fitt | 3,274 | 62.8 | +0.5 |
| UUP | Harold E. Smith | 1,936 | 37.2 | −0.5 |
| Majority | | 1,338 | 25.6 | +1.0 |
| Turnout | | 5,210 | 72.2 | +1.9 |
| Republican Labour hold | | Swing | | |
