= Sir George Clark, 3rd Baronet =

Northern Irish politician (1914–1991)

Sir George Anthony Clark, 3rd Baronet, DL (24 January 1914 – 20 February 1991) was an Orangeman and unionist politician in Northern Ireland.

The son of Sir George Clark, 2nd Baronet, of Dunlambert, Clark studied at Canford School before becoming a farmer and company director. At the 1938 Northern Ireland general election, he was elected for the Ulster Unionist Party in Belfast Dock, although he lost his seat at the 1945 general election. During World War II, he served as a captain in the Black Watch, and in 1951, he succeeded as the 3rd Baronet.

Clark was elected to the Senate of Northern Ireland in 1951, serving until 1969, and acting as a Deputy Speaker from 1957 until 1959. In 1954, he was appointed High Sheriff of Antrim. In 1957, he became Grand Master of the Grand Orange Lodge of Ireland of the Orange Order, filling the position for ten years. From 1958 to 1961, he was the Imperial Grand President of the Imperial Grand Orange Council of the World. He also Deputy Lieutenant for the City of Belfast in 1961, and Chairman of the Standing Committee of the Ulster Unionist Council from 1967 to 1972. From 1980 to 1990, he was President of the Ulster Unionist Council, then became its Patron until his death the following year.

He married Nancy Catherine Clark (born 1927 d, 2016), her maiden name also being Clark, of Upperlands, County Londonderry. They had one daughter, Elizabeth (Reid). He was succeeded in the baronetcy by his brother, Sir Colin Clark, 4th Baronet.

== Arms ==
Coat of arms of Sir George Clark, 3rd Baronet

Notes
Granted 1 June 1920 by George James Burtchaell, Deputy Ulster King of Arms.
Crest
A demi-hunstman Proper habited Argent blowing a horn Or.
Torse
Of the colours
Escutcheon
Barry wavy of four Argent and Azure a galley with sail net and flags flying all Or on a chief of the second a thistle slipped with two leaves between two noses of the third.
Motto
Free For A Blast

Parliament of Northern Ireland
Preceded by Harry Midgley	Member of Parliament for Belfast Dock; 1938–1945	Succeeded by Hugh Downey
Political offices
Preceded by William McCleery	Grand Master of the Orange Institution of Ireland; 1957–1967	Succeeded by John Bryans
Party political offices
Preceded by James G. Cunningham	President of the Ulster Unionist Party; 1980–1990	Succeeded by Josias Cunningham
Baronetage of the United Kingdom
Preceded by George Clark	Baronet (of Dunlambert); 1950–1991	Succeeded by Colin Clark
