= Thomas Loftus Cole =

Politician in Northern Ireland (1877–1961)

Member of Parliament for Belfast East
- In office 5 July 1949 – 3 February 1950
- Preceded by: Henry Harland
- Succeeded by: Alan McKibbin

Personal details
- Born: 1877 Belfast, Ireland
- Died: 7 March 1961 (aged 83–84) Belfast, Northern Ireland
- Party: Ulster Unionist Party
- Relations: John James Cole (brother)
- Profession: Pharmacist

Thomas Loftus Cole CBE (1877 – 7 March 1961) was a unionist politician in Northern Ireland.

Cole studied at the Sullivan Upper School in Holywood before qualifying as a pharmacist. Despite this, he worked as a property developer, and was elected to Lurgan Urban District Council in 1911, serving until 1917. He returned to politics in 1931, winning a seat on the Belfast Corporation for the Ulster Unionist Party, which he held until 1958. He was High Sheriff of Belfast in 1937 and Deputy Lord Mayor of Belfast in 1938–1939. He stood in Belfast Pottinger at the 1933 and 1938 Northern Ireland general elections, but was not successful.

At the 1945 general election, Cole was elected for Belfast East. He made no speeches in Parliament, and stood down at the 1950 election. He also held the seat of Belfast Dock in the Northern Ireland House of Commons from 1949 until he lost the seat in 1953.

In reference to whether the name of Northern Ireland should be changed to Ulster, Cole remarked in 1949 that the British Government had refused to allow the name change "because the area did not comprise the nine counties of the province. We should demand our three counties [Donegal, Monaghan and Cavan] so that we could call our country Ulster, a name of which we are all proud".

Parliament of the United Kingdom
Preceded by Henry Harland	Member of Parliament for Belfast East; 1945–1950	Succeeded by Alan McKibbin
Parliament of Northern Ireland
Preceded by Hugh Downey	Member of Parliament for Belfast Dock; 1949–1953	Succeeded by Murtagh Morgan
Civic offices
Preceded by Thomas McConnell	High Sheriff of Belfast; 1937 – 1939	Succeeded by Samuel Boyd Thompson
