= Martin McBirney =

Northern Irish politician (1922–1974)

Robert Martin McBirney QC (1922–16 September 1974), known as Martin McBirney, was a magistrate and politician from Northern Ireland who was assassinated.

== Biography ==
McBirney studied law at Trinity College Dublin and became a barrister in Belfast, before being called to the bar at Gray's Inn. In his spare time, he became active in the Northern Ireland Labour Party (NILP), and served on its executive from 1964-67. In 1966-67, he was also party Chairman. He combined these roles as the first Chairman of the Northern Ireland Society of Labour Lawyers.

McBirney stood for the NILP in Belfast Willowfield at the 1965 Northern Ireland general election, taking 35.1% of the vote. He was next a candidate in East Belfast at the 1966 general election, and took 45.3% of the vote in one of the party's best ever results, although he was not elected. His final contest was Belfast Pottinger at the 1969 Northern Ireland general election, where he took 48.6% of the vote and was fewer than two hundred votes short of being elected.

In the 1970s, McBirney focused on his legal career. He was made a Queen's Counsel, was appointed a resident magistrate, and served as Senior Crown Prosecutor for Belfast. He worked as a lawyer for the defence on civil rights cases, including one involving the Derry Citizens' Action Committee, in which he defended, among others, Eamonn McCann.

== Death ==
At approximately 8.20 am on 16 September 1974, McBirney was shot in his home at 172 Belmont Road, Belfast. A man was seen to get out of a car and walk to the rear of the McBirney home. The man was then observed leaving and getting back into the car which had two other occupants. The car was located some 500 yards (460 m) from the scene of the murder. Its occupants were seen to drive off in another vehicle. The car used to convey the gunmen to and from the scene had been hijacked on the morning of the murder. It was attributed to the Irish Republican Army.

Police investigations linked one person to the murder who was also identified as being the gunman. He was subsequently charged and convicted of murder and received a life sentence.

On the same day another judge, Rory Conaghan, was shot dead by the IRA outside his home at Beechlands off the Malone Road, Belfast. Both murders have been attributed to the Irish Republican Army. On hearing of McBirney's death, his sister-in-law, Frances Cooke, suffered a fatal heart attack.

McBirney was a Protestant who had married a Roman Catholic. The couple had one child. He was friendly with politician Paddy Devlin, with playwright Sam Thompson and poet Louis MacNeice. He personally wrote documentaries and plays for the BBC, including one on Daniel O'Connell. McBirney appeared as a contestant on the Round Britain Quiz.

Poet Michael Longley later revealed that he had written the poem A Civil Servant in McBirney's honour.

Party political offices
Preceded by William Gunning	Chairman of the Northern Ireland Labour Party; 1966–1967	Succeeded by Paddy Devlin
