= Tom Boyd (Northern Ireland politician) =

Tom Boyd (April 1903 – 6 December 1991) was a shipyard worker, patternmaker, trade unionist and politician in Northern Ireland.

Boyd was one of nine children; after leaving national school at the age of 12, he worked at the city sheriff's office. After studying at Belfast Technical College and Queen's University, Belfast, Boyd became prominent in the United Patternmakers' Association. Joining the Northern Ireland Labour Party (NILP), he stood for election to the Belfast Board of Guardians in 1933.

In the 1938 Stormont elections, Boyd stood unsuccessfully in Belfast Victoria. In the 1945 UK general election, he stood for the Westminster seat of Belfast East, taking 43.6% of the vote. He stood for the seat again in 1950, 1951 and 1955, but never came so close to election.

In the 1949 Stormont election, Boyd stood in Belfast Bloomfield. In 1953, he stood in Belfast Pottinger.

He married Janet Brice in 1956.

In 1958 he was elected to Stormont for the Pottinger area of east Belfast; on election he became the leader of the NILP; in 1968 he co-founded the cross-border Council of Labour, which included the NILP, the Republican Labour Party, and the Irish Labour Party. He was NILP leader until he lost his seat at the 1969 election.

Boyd was appointed Deputy Lieutenant of Belfast in 1975. He also led the Presbyterian Church of Ireland Social Services Committee until 1978.

== Sources ==
- Northern Ireland Parliamentary Elections Results: Biographies

Parliament of Northern Ireland
Preceded by Samuel Rodgers	Member of Parliament for Belfast Pottinger; 1958–1969	Succeeded by Joshua Cardwell
Party political offices
Preceded by Vivian Simpson	Chair of the Northern Ireland Labour Party; 1953–1954	Succeeded by Cecil Allen
Preceded by None	Leader of the Northern Ireland Labour Party at Stormont; 1958–1969	Succeeded by Vivian Simpson
