= Belfast Pottinger (Northern Ireland Parliament constituency) =

Constituency of the Parliament of Northern Ireland

Coordinates: 54.594°N 5.898°W

- Former Borough constituency for the Parliament of Northern Ireland
- Belfast Pottinger shown within Belfast and Belfast shown within Northern Ireland

Former constituency
- Created: 1929
- Abolished: 1973
- Election method: First past the post

Belfast Pottinger was a constituency of the Parliament of Northern Ireland.

== Boundaries ==
Belfast Pottinger was a borough constituency comprising part of eastern Belfast. It was created in 1929, when the House of Commons (Method of Voting and Redistribution of Seats) Act (Northern Ireland) 1929 introduced first-past-the-post elections throughout Northern Ireland.

Belfast Pottinger was created by the division of Belfast East into four new constituencies. It survived unchanged, returning one member of Parliament, until the Parliament of Northern Ireland was temporarily suspended in 1972, and then formally abolished in 1973.

== Politics ==
The seat was a stronghold for the labour movement, although Unionist candidates always polled well and were occasionally able to win the seat.

== Members of Parliament ==
Election	Member	Party
1929	Jack Beattie	Northern Ireland Labour
1934	Jack Beattie	Independent Labour
1942	Jack Beattie	Northern Ireland Labour
1943	Jack Beattie	Independent Labour
1945	Jack Beattie	Federation of Labour
1949	Jack Beattie	Independent Labour
1949	Samuel Rodgers	Ulster Unionist
1958	Tom Boyd	Northern Ireland Labour
1969	Joshua Cardwell	Ulster Unionist
1973	constituency abolished	

== Election results ==
General Election 1929: Belfast Pottinger
Party	Candidate	Votes	%	±%
NI Labour	Jack Beattie	6,071	54.6	
UUP	James Augustine Duff	5,057	45.4	
Majority		1,014	9.2	
Turnout		11,128	76.0	
NI Labour win (new seat)				

General Election 1933: Belfast Pottinger
Party	Candidate	Votes	%	±%
NI Labour	Jack Beattie	5,753	53.6	−1.0
UUP	Thomas Loftus Cole	4,978	46.4	+1.0
Majority		775	7.2	−2.0
Turnout		10,731	79.6	+3.6
NI Labour hold		Swing		

General Election 1938: Belfast Pottinger
Party	Candidate	Votes	%	±%
Independent Labour	Jack Beattie	5,480	52.2	−1.4
UUP	Thomas Loftus Cole	5,011	47.8	+1.4
Majority		469	4.4	N/A
Turnout		10,491	80.9	+1.3
Independent Labour gain from NI Labour		Swing		

General Election 1945: Belfast Pottinger
Party	Candidate	Votes	%	±%
Independent Labour	Jack Beattie	5,952	52.5	+0.3
UUP	Samuel Rodgers	4,474	47.5	−0.3
Majority		478	5.0	+0.6
Turnout		10,426	78.7	−2.2
Independent Labour hold		Swing		

General Election 1949: Belfast Pottinger
Party	Candidate	Votes	%	±%
UUP	Samuel Rodgers	6,262	62.9	+15.4
Independent Labour	Jack Beattie	3,693	37.1	−15.4
Majority		2,569	25.8	N/A
Turnout		9,955	82.7	+4.0
UUP gain from Independent Labour		Swing		

General Election 1953: Belfast Pottinger
Party	Candidate	Votes	%	±%
UUP	Samuel Rodgers	3,680	45.1	−17.8
NI Labour	Tom Boyd	3,324	40.8	New
Irish Labour	Jack Beattie	1,151	14.1	−23.0
Majority		356	4.3	−21.5
Turnout		8,155	68.2	−14.5
UUP hold		Swing		

General Election 1958: Belfast Pottinger
Party	Candidate	Votes	%	±%
NI Labour	Tom Boyd	4,573	58.5	+17.7
UUP	Samuel Rodgers	3,240	41.5	−3.6
Majority		1,333	17.0	N/A
Turnout		7,813	71.8	+3.6
NI Labour gain from UUP		Swing		

General Election 1962: Belfast Pottinger
Party	Candidate	Votes	%	±%
NI Labour	Tom Boyd	4,674	62.4	+3.9
UUP	Herbert Walker	2,822	37.6	−3.9
Majority		1,852	24.8	+7.8
Turnout		7,496	72.0	+0.2
NI Labour hold		Swing		

General Election 1965: Belfast Pottinger
Party	Candidate	Votes	%	±%
NI Labour	Tom Boyd	3,208	57.9	−4.5
UUP	John Bannister	2,334	42.1	+4.5
Majority		874	15.8	−9.0
Turnout		5,542	58.9	−13.1
NI Labour hold		Swing		

General Election 1969: Belfast Pottinger
Party	Candidate	Votes	%	±%
UUP	Joshua Cardwell	2,902	51.4	+9.3
NI Labour	Martin McBirney	2,744	48.6	−9.3
Majority		158	2.8	N/A
Turnout		5,646	67.8	+8.9
UUP gain from NI Labour		Swing		
