= Belfast Central (Northern Ireland Parliament constituency) =

Constituency of the Parliament of Northern Ireland

Coordinates: 54.597°N 5.931°W

- Former Borough constituency for the Parliament of Northern Ireland
- Belfast Central shown within Belfast and Belfast shown within Northern Ireland

Former constituency
- Created: 1929
- Abolished: 1973
- Election method: First past the post

Belfast Central was a constituency of the Parliament of Northern Ireland.

== Boundaries ==
Belfast Central was a borough constituency comprising part of central Belfast. It was created in 1929, when the House of Commons (Method of Voting and Redistribution of Seats) Act (Northern Ireland) 1929 introduced first-past-the-post elections throughout Northern Ireland.

Belfast Central was created by the division of Belfast West into four new constituencies. It survived unchanged, returning one member of Parliament, until the Parliament of Northern Ireland was temporarily suspended in 1972, and then formally abolished in 1973.

The constituency consisted of inner city areas of Belfast equivalent to the modern areas of Unity, Brown Square, John Street and Lancaster Street. Residential redevelopment caused the electorate to fall sharply from 20,399 in 1929 to 6,384 in 1969. By the time of the dissolution of the Stormont Parliament, it had just over 2,500 voters.

The constituency is now part of Belfast North and Belfast West with most of the former seat now part of the New Lodge ward.

== Politics ==
The constituency was one of the most staunchly nationalist in Belfast. It was initially held by Nationalist Party members, then later by a variety of labour movement activists and members of smaller nationalist parties. In 1953, a split between three Labour candidates led to the Unionist candidate finishing just 576 votes behind the victor.

== Members of Parliament ==
Year	Name	Party
1929	Joseph Devlin	Nationalist
1934	Thomas Joseph Campbell	Nationalist
1946	Frank Hanna	NI Labour
1949	Frank Hanna	Independent Labour
1949	Frank Hanna	Irish Labour
1949	Frank Hanna	Independent Labour
1958	Frank Hanna	Ind. Labour Group
1965	John Joseph Brennan	National Democratic
1969	Paddy Kennedy	Republican Labour

== Election results ==
General Election 22 May 1929: Belfast Central
Party	Candidate	Votes	%	±%
Nationalist	Joseph Devlin	10,624	71.8	
UUP	David Cecil Lindsay	4,163	28.2	
Majority		6,461	43.6	
Turnout		14,787	72.5	
Nationalist win (new seat)				

General Election 30 November 1933: Belfast Central
Party	Candidate	Votes	%	±%
Nationalist	Joseph Devlin	7,411	61.4	−10.4
Irish Republican	Patrick Thornbury	4,650	38.6	New
Majority		2,761	22.8	−20.8
Turnout		12,061	63.6	−7.9
Nationalist hold		Swing		

1934 Belfast Central by-election
Party	Candidate	Votes	%	±%
Nationalist	Thomas Joseph Campbell	4,948	47.3	−14.1
NI Labour	William McMullen	3,784	36.2	New
Anti-Partition	Harry Diamond	1,518	14.5	New
Ulster Democratic	William McKeaveney	214	2.0	New
Majority		1,164	11.1	−11.7
Turnout		10,464	55.7	−7.9
Nationalist hold		Swing		

General Election 9 February 1938: Belfast Central
Party	Candidate	Votes	%	±%
Nationalist	Thomas Joseph Campbell	Unopposed	N/A	N/A
Nationalist hold		Swing	N/A	

General Election 14 June 1945: Belfast Central
Party	Candidate	Votes	%	±%
Nationalist	Thomas Joseph Campbell	Unopposed	N/A	N/A
Nationalist hold		Swing	N/A	

1946 Belfast Central by-election
Party	Candidate	Votes	%	±%
NI Labour	Frank Hanna	5,566	66.7	New
Socialist Republican	Victor Halley	2,783	33.3	New
Majority		2,783	33.4	N/A
Turnout		8,349	52.4	N/A
NI Labour gain from Nationalist		Swing	N/A	

General Election 10 February 1949: Belfast Central
Party	Candidate	Votes	%	±%
Independent Labour	Frank Hanna	Unopposed	N/A	N/A
Independent Labour gain from Nationalist		Swing	N/A	

General Election 22 October 1953: Belfast Central
Party	Candidate	Votes	%	±%
Independent Labour	Frank Hanna	3,902	35.3	N/A
UUP	Joseph Foster Cairns	3,326	30.0	New
Independent Irish Labour	Timothy Joseph O'Sullivan	2,437	22.0	New
Irish Labour	Jack Beattie	1,406	12.7	New
Majority		576	5.3	N/A
Turnout		11,071	69.9	N/A
Independent Labour hold		Swing	N/A	

General Election 20 March 1958: Belfast Central
Party	Candidate	Votes	%	±%
Ind. Labour Group	Frank Hanna	4,683	46.8	+11.5
UUP	William Craig	3,228	32.2	+2.2
Irish Labour	Desmond Patrick Marrinan	2,105	21.0	+8.3
Majority		1,455	14.6	N/A
Turnout		10,016	71.6	+1.7
Ind. Labour Group gain from Independent Labour		Swing		

General Election 31 May 1962: Belfast Central
Party	Candidate	Votes	%	±%
Ind. Labour Group	Frank Hanna	Unopposed	N/A	N/A
Ind. Labour Group hold		Swing	N/A	

General Election 25 November 1965: Belfast Central
Party	Candidate	Votes	%	±%
National Democratic	John Joseph Brennan	Unopposed	N/A	N/A
National Democratic gain from Ind. Labour Group		Swing	N/A	

General Election 24 February 1969: Belfast Central
Party	Candidate	Votes	%	±%
Republican Labour	Paddy Kennedy	2,032	56.9	New
National Democratic	John Joseph Brennan	1,538	43.1	N/A
Majority		494	13.8	N/A
Turnout		3,570	58.3	N/A
Republican Labour hold		Swing	N/A	
