= Federation of Labour =

Federation of Labour may refer to:

- Federation of Labour (Ireland), a former political party in Northern Ireland
- Labour Federation (Italy), a former political party in Italy
- Labour Federation (Lithuania), a former political party in Lithuania
- New Zealand Federation of Labour, now known as the New Zealand Council of Trade Unions

== See also ==
- Labour Party (disambiguation)
