= Vincent Hanna =

British television journalist (1939–1997)

- Born: Vincent Leo Martin Hanna; 9 August 1939; Belfast, Northern Ireland, UK
- Died: 22 July 1997 (aged 57); Belfast, Northern Ireland, UK
- Occupations: Journalist, broadcaster
- Known for: Coverage of United Kingdom general elections
- Spouse: Joan Fitt (m. 1975)
- Children: 2
- Parent: Frank Hanna

Vincent Leo Martin Hanna (9 August 1939 – 22 July 1997) was a Northern Irish television journalist known for his coverage of United Kingdom by-elections.

== Early life and education ==
Hanna was from a Northern Ireland Catholic background and was born in Belfast. His father, Frank, was a prominent solicitor and a member of the House of Commons of Northern Ireland, the lower house of the Parliament of Northern Ireland at Stormont. All five of Frank's children would also become lawyers. Hanna was educated at Trinity College, Dublin, The Queen's University of Belfast, Harvard University and the London School of Economics. In 1965, he was admitted as a solicitor and worked for the family legal practice in industrial injuries and civil rights cases. He moved to London in 1970.

== Journalism ==
Hanna's freelance journalism was noticed by The Sunday Times editor Harold Evans, who offered him a job as an industrial relations correspondent. He embraced his new career with an enthusiasm that irritated some of his less committed colleagues. He was recruited by the BBC Current Affairs department in 1973 and became well known for his Newsnight coverage of by-elections. Fellow journalist Andrew Marr said his filmed reports were "a new kind of political reporting, much copied and never rivalled, which ended forever the era when parliamentary by-elections were obscure and largely unreported contests". His third campaign was spent doggedly pursuing candidates with difficult questions. Very few escaped unscathed. At Darlington in March 1983, Hanna's broadcasts helped to destroy the campaign of SDP candidate Tony Cook, who had been the early favourite to win.

In 1984, Hanna's impartiality came into question when he failed to disguise his support for tactical voting in some reports on the Chesterfield by-election of that year. The Labour candidate, Tony Benn, accused him of acting as the SDP candidate. During the Greenwich by-election of February 1987, he publicly accused Angela Rumbold, a Conservative Minister, of being a liar. Rumbold had cross-examined him over the alleged impartiality of a public opinion poll which showed the SDP candidate closing on the Labour candidate.

== Later career ==
Such was Hanna's identification with by-elections that in 1987 he was a guest star in Blackadder the Third, reporting on S. Baldrick's victory at the rotten borough of Dunny-on-the-Wold in the episode "Dish and Dishonesty" (and credited as "his own great-great-great-grandfather"). By this time, however, Hanna had left the BBC to set up his own freelance production company which specialised in trade union issues and mainly worked for the public service television station Channel 4. Alongside Andrew Rawnsley, he also co-presented A Week in Politics for the channel from 1989 until his death. He was a regular broadcaster on BBC Radio 5 Live from 1994.

From 1996 he presented Medium Wave on BBC Radio 4 and also hosted two series of the panel game Cross Questioned (the second was broadcast posthumously). His media company gave public relations advice to several local authorities on presentation.

Hanna was an active trade unionist in the National Union of Journalists (NUJ). He led a strike at the BBC in 1985 when the Governors, bowing to Government pressure, suppressed a documentary called Real Lives: At the Edge of the Union which covered the home life of Martin McGuinness of Sinn Féin and Gregory Campbell of the Democratic Unionist Party (DUP).

== Personal life ==
Hanna married Joan Fitt (a daughter of the politician Gerry Fitt) in 1975. They had two daughters. Vincent Hanna died of heart disease in 1997 at the age of 57.
