= Paddy Devlin =

Northern Irish politician (1925–1999)

- Devlin c. 1980

Member of the NI Parliament for Belfast Falls
- In office 1969–1972
- Preceded by: Harry Diamond
- Succeeded by: Constituency Abolished

Personal details
- Born: Patrick Joseph Devlin; 8 March 1925 Pound Loney, Belfast, Northern Ireland
- Died: 15 August 1999 (aged 74) Belfast, Northern Ireland
- Party: Irish Labour (1948–1958); NILP (1958–1970); SDLP (1970–1977); United Labour (1978–1980s); LPNI (1985–1990)
- Spouse: Theresa Devlin
- Children: 5

Patrick Joseph Devlin (8 March 1925 – 15 August 1999) was an Irish socialist, labour, and civil rights activist and writer from Belfast. He was a founding member of the Social Democratic and Labour Party (SDLP), a Stormont MP and a member of the 1974 Power Sharing Executive.

Described as a "relentless campaigner against sectarianism", Devlin had once been a member of the IRA but later renounced physical force republicanism to work at transcending sectarian differences through peaceful, socialist and nationalist political means.

== Early life ==
Devlin was born in the Pound Loney in the Lower Falls in West Belfast on 8 March 1925 and lived in the city for almost all his life. His mother was a leading activist in Joe Devlin's (no relation) Nationalist Party machine in the Falls area, and Devlin grew up in a highly political household. However, his early activism was confined to Fianna Éireann and then the Irish Republican Army (IRA) and as a result, he was interned in Crumlin Road Gaol from 1942 to 1945 at age 17. After his release, he became convinced that physical force nationalism would fail in its goals.

== Post-war ==
After the war, and in search of work, he spent some time in Portsmouth working as a scaffolder and in Coventry working in the car industry. In Coventry, he became interested in Labour and trade union politics and briefly joined the British Labour Party.

Returning to Belfast in 1948, he found the local Labour Party split over partition. Under Harry Midgley’s influence, the Northern Ireland Labour Party (NILP) had adopted a pro-partition position. In response, many anti-partition Labour activists left the NILP and joined the Irish Labour Party, which was led locally by Jack Beattie, who was an MP in Stormont and Westminster. Paddy Devlin joined the Irish Labour Party in 1949.

Devlin was elected as the Irish Labour candidate in a council by-election for the Falls ward in 1956, beating Gerry Fitt, who fought the election as the Dock Labour Party candidate.

Later Catholic Action claimed the Irish Labour Party was infested with communists and ensured the party was effectively wiped out, and Devlin lost his seat in 1958. In the same year, in the aftermath of the Council election defeat, he joined the Northern Ireland Labour Party.

In 1967, Devlin was elected Chairman of the NILP. In the Northern Ireland elections held in 1969, Devlin stood as the NILP candidate and beat Republican Labour's Harry Diamond for the Falls seat in Stormont.

From 1968 through 1969, Devlin was very involved in the Northern Ireland civil rights movement. The heavy-handed response by the RUC and the B Specials to civil rights marches resulted in widespread rioting. The confrontations descended into sectarian violence as Catholic areas, especially in Belfast, came under attack from Loyalist gangs, with many families being burnt out of their homes.

Devlin’s relationship with the NILP became more strained as he detected a "deafening silence" with "no statements condemning the horrors of the summer, no assertion of the non-sectarian socialist principles we had tried to promote … the NILP in fact tended to disregard the existence of the civil rights movement". Devlin believed that the NILP, working in alliance with the civil rights movement, could have changed the situation and reduced the sectarian tensions. Instead, what he deemed to be the party's inadequate response in the summer of 1969 led to his drift away from the NILP. Devlin started discussing with other Labour activists, civil rights leaders and moderate nationalists the possibility of launching a new party. In response to these discussions, the NILP terminated its party membership in August 1970.

Devlin then went on, with Fitt, John Hume, Austin Currie and others, to found the SDLP in 1970. The Social Democratic and Labour Party (SDLP) brought together politicians and activists from Labour, civil rights and moderate Irish Nationalist backgrounds to form a party committed to achieving a united Ireland by consent and to working within the Northern Ireland political structures for constructive local cross-community politics. At the time of the SDLP's formation, Devlin believed "the basic party philosophy was to be socialist and democratic and work for the unity of Ireland by consent".

He was later involved, at the request of William Whitelaw, the Secretary of State for Northern Ireland, in ensuring safe passage for Gerry Adams for talks with the British government in 1973.

He was a member of the Northern Ireland Assembly, 1973, and Minister of Health and Social Services in the power-sharing Executive from 1 January 1974 to 28 May 1974. The power-sharing Executive was a cross-community coalition administration. The SDLP joined the Executive along with the pro-power-sharing wing of the Ulster Unionist Party and the Alliance Party. The Executive would be short-lived. It collapsed after five months at the end of May 1974, following the Protestant workers Ulster Workers Council strike.

By 1977 Devlin felt that the SDLP "was being stripped of its socialism and being taken over by unadulterated nationalists". These differences came to a head when Devlin resigned as chairman of the parliamentary group and issued a statement criticising the direction of the SDLP. A few days later, the SDLP executive met and voted to expel him from the party.

In 1978 he established the United Labour Party, which aimed to be a broad-based Labour formation in Northern Ireland. He stood under its label for the European Parliament in 1979 but polled just 6,122 first preferences (1.1% of those cast) and lost his deposit.

Devlin did not support the hunger strike and the campaign for political status for Republican prisoners. He was re-elected as an Independent Socialist to Belfast City Council in the 1981 local elections but with a much reduced vote of 1,343; down from the 7,087 votes he had won four years earlier.

In 1987 he, together with remnants of the NILP and others, established Labour '87 as another attempt at building a Labour Party in Northern Ireland (LPNI) by uniting the disparate groups supporting labour and socialist policies but it too met with little or no success. In 1985, he lost his place on Belfast City council.

Devlin was also involved in the Peace Train Organisation.

Devlin suffered from severe diabetes and throughout the 1990s suffered a series of ailments as his health and sight collapsed.

== Political beliefs ==
John Hume and others supposedly saw Devlin as too forgiving of police, but not the British Army, as Devlin supported a motion tabled at the SDLP's annual conference in 1976 for British withdrawal. The motion, also supported by Ivan Cooper, Seamus Mallon, and Paddy Duffy, but opposed by Party leader Gerry Fitt, John Hume and Austin Currie, was defeated by 153 votes to 111. Devlin also spoke out against the assassination of Irish National Liberation Army chief Ronnie Bunting in 1980, commonly attributed to an Ulster Defence Association hit squad, but which Devlin always believed was carried out by an 'SAS type' unit with British Security force involvement.

Devlin was a lifelong socialist who ended up being expelled from the SDLP for criticizing its lack of socialist politics.

Outside of party politics, Devlin spent his later years as Area Secretary of the Irish Transport and General Workers' Union. His knowledge of the Industrial Relations Order (Northern Ireland 1976) was extensive. He wrote an acclaimed study (his MSc thesis) of the 1935 Outdoor Relief Riots in Belfast, published as Yes We Have No Bananas in 1985.

== Sources ==
- Devlin, Paddy (1993). Straight Left: An Autobiography. Blackstaff Press Ltd. ISBN 0-85640-514-0 / 9780856405143.

Parliament of Northern Ireland
| Preceded by Harry Diamond | Member of Parliament for Belfast Falls; 1969–1973 | Parliament abolished |
Northern Ireland Assembly (1973)
| New assembly | Assembly Member for West Belfast; 1973–1974 | Assembly abolished |
Northern Ireland Constitutional Convention
| New convention | Member for West Belfast; 1975–1976 | Convention dissolved |
Party political offices
| Preceded by Martin McBirney | Chairman of the Northern Ireland Labour Party; 1967–1969 | Succeeded by Robert Allen |
