= Netherleigh House =

Building in Belfast, Northern Ireland

Netherleigh House (commonly known as Netherleigh) is a Grade B1 listed building in Belfast, Northern Ireland.

The building is located on Massey Avenue, close to the Stormont Estate and Campbell College. It was built around 1875 and is thought to have been designed by William Henry Lynn. Only part of the original structure remains, the rest having been demolished. The building was extended in the 1970s, with two office blocks built to the south and east of Netherleigh.

Netherleigh House has had a number of owners including a linen merchant and a politician Major Samuel Hall-Thompson, before it became a preparatory school for Campbell College, then government offices. It served as the headquarters for the Department for the Economy (formerly the Department of Enterprise, Trade and Investment) and the offices of the minister for that department. The building was vacated by the department in 2023 and deemed as no longer required by the Northern Ireland Executive. It was sold in 2024 and plans were announced in 2025 to convert the complex into a nursing home.
