= Enniskillen (disambiguation) =

Enniskillen may refer to:

- The town of Enniskillen in Northern Ireland
- Enniskillen (Northern Ireland Parliament constituency)
- Enniskillen (UK Parliament constituency)
- Enniskillen, County Tyrone, a downland in County Tyrone, Northern Ireland
- Earl of Enniskillen, a title in the Peerage of Ireland
- Wirral-Enniskillen, a Local Service District in New Brunswick Canada
- Enniskillen, Ontario, a township in Ontario, Canada
- Rural Municipality of Enniskillen No. 3, Saskatchewan, Canada
- Enniskillen Castle
