= Henry Holmes (Northern Ireland politician) =

Henry Holmes (9 July 1906 – 8 July 1992), often known as Harry Holmes, was a politician in Northern Ireland.

Holmes was educated at the Royal Belfast Academical Institution before opening his own draper's shop, "Henry's Stores". In 1943, he became the Honorary Treasurer of Harry Midgley's Commonwealth Labour Party, but he left in 1944 to join the rival Northern Ireland Labour Party (NILP), for which he stood unsuccessfully in Antrim at the 1945 United Kingdom general election.

Holmes was elected to the Dock ward of Belfast City Council in the 1940s, but lost his seat in 1947. Holmes was Chairman of the NILP in 1948, but he resigned the following year to join the Ulster Unionist Party, taking a seat in Belfast City Council's Pottinger ward the following year. He defeated the veteran Independent Unionist MP Tommy Henderson in Belfast Shankill in 1953 and was re-elected in 1958. He resigned in 1959, following business difficulties, and later retired to Weston-super-Mare in England.

Party political offices
Preceded by Robert Getgood	Chair of the Northern Ireland Labour Party; 1947–1948	Succeeded by James Morrow
Parliament of Northern Ireland
Preceded by Tommy Henderson	Member of Parliament for Belfast Shankill; 1953–1960	Succeeded by Desmond Boal
