= William McConnell Wilton =

Northern Irish politician

- Full name: William McConnell Wilton
- Other occupation: Unionist politician; lay Presbyterian

Domestic
Years	League	Role

William McConnell Wilton was a Northern Irish Unionist politician who served as Chairman of the Independent Unionist Association. He was also a prominent lay Presbyterian.

== Biography ==
In his youth, Wilton was a keen footballer, and played for Institute F.C. in the club's first ever match.

Wilton became politically active. His first candidacy was as an independent Unionist in Belfast Oldpark, at the 1933 Northern Ireland general election. He lost to the incumbent, Wilson Hungerford, despite taking more than 40% of the vote.

When the Independent Unionist Association was founded, in 1937, Wilton was elected as its Chairman. He stood for the new organisation at the 1938 general election, in Belfast Clifton, taking 45.6% of the vote, but again missing out on election. Wilton also stood in the 1943 Belfast West by-election, taking third place, with 17.5% of the votes cast.

Wilton was a member of the Northern Ireland Senate from 1945 until 1953. In the early 1950s, he produced the Ulster Protestant newspaper with Norman Porter. Outside Parliament, he led a campaign against activity on the Sabbath, and served on the council of the Irish Football Association.
