= Norman Porter =

Member of the Parliament of Northern Ireland
- In office 1953–1958
- Constituency: Belfast Clifton

Personal details
- Born: February 12, 1919 Portsmouth, England
- Died: March 12, 1991 (aged 72)
- Party: Independent Unionist
- Children: Norman Porter
- Occupation: Politician, lay preacher, newspaper editor

Norman Porter (12 February 1919 – 12 March 1991) was a loyalist politician in Northern Ireland.

Born in Portsmouth in England, Porter grew up in Belfast, where he attended the Harding Memorial School.

A lay preacher, an Orangeman, an Apprentice Boy and a member of the Royal Black Institution, Porter became the leader of the National Union of Protestants in Northern Ireland in 1948. Ian Paisley was treasurer of the group, but left after Porter refused to join his new Free Presbyterian Church of Ulster. The Union disintegrated soon after. In 1953, Porter became the Director of the Evangelical Protestant Society. He also edited the Ulster Protestant newspaper, which he produced with William McConnell Wilton.

At the 1953 Northern Ireland general election, Porter was elected as an Independent Unionist MP for Belfast Clifton, standing with the slogan "For God and Ulster". He defeated Samuel Hall-Thompson, who uniquely among Ministers was not a member of the Orange Order and who had faced criticism from loyalists for appearing to compromise with the Roman Catholic Church while Minister of Education.

Porter attended the first meeting of the Ulster Protestant Action group in 1956, but he immediately withdrew. He lost his seat at the 1958 general election to Robin Kinahan. Porter was again defeated in the seat in a 1959 by-election.

Porter was an opponent of Catholicism. In a 1964 speech reported in the Belfast Newsletter, he stated: "When you become too friendly with those of different religious persuasion, you find it increasingly hard and difficult to oppose their beliefs – this leads to compromise."

In 1969, he stood in Belfast Duncairn, where sitting Ulster Unionist Party MP William Fitzsimmons' daughter had married a Roman Catholic, and Fitzsimmons had subsequently resigned from the Orange Order. Porter presented himself as a candidate whose opposition to Catholicism was in no doubt, but proved unsuccessful in the poll. He emigrated to Australia in 1970, but returned to Northern Ireland in 1982, settling in Portstewart.

Porter's son, also Norman Porter, has written several books on politics in Northern Ireland.

Parliament of Northern Ireland
Preceded by Samuel Hall-Thompson	Member of Parliament for Belfast Clifton; 1953–1958	Succeeded by Robin Kinahan
