= Henry Harland (politician) =

British politician (1876–1945)

Henry Peirson Harland

Member of Parliament for Belfast East
- In office 8 February 1940 – 15 June 1945
- Preceded by: Herbert Dixon
- Succeeded by: Thomas Loftus Cole

Personal details
- Born: 1 September 1876 Uxbridge, England
- Died: 11 August 1945 (aged 68) Aldenham, England
- Party: Ulster Unionist Party

Henry Peirson Harland (1 September 1876 – 11 August 1945) was a unionist politician in Northern Ireland.

Born in Uxbridge, Harland studied at Rugby School before being appointed as a director or Harland and Wolff, and of Short and Harland. He worked as an engineer worldwide before winning the Belfast East by-election in 1940 for the Ulster Unionist Party. Despite holding a seat in Northern Ireland, he lived in Aldenham, Hertfordshire. He died shortly before the 1945 general election.

Parliament of the United Kingdom
Preceded by Herbert Dixon	Member of Parliament for Belfast East; 1940–1945	Succeeded by Thomas Loftus Cole
