= 1940 Belfast East by-election =

UK Parliamentary by-election

The 1940 Belfast East by-election was held on 8 February 1940. The by-election was held due to the elevation to the peerage of the incumbent UUP MP, Herbert Dixon. It was won by the UUP candidate Henry Harland, who was unopposed.

1940 Belfast East by-election
Party	Candidate	Votes	%	±%
UUP	Henry Harland	Unopposed		
Registered electors				
UUP hold				
