= Lloyd Hall-Thompson =

Northern Irish politician (1920–1992)

Member of the Northern Ireland Constitutional Convention for Belfast North
- In office 1975–1976

Member of the Northern Ireland Assembly for Belfast North
- In office 1973–1974

Member of the Northern Ireland Parliament for Belfast Clifton
- In office 1969–1973

Personal details
- Born: 9 April 1920 Belfast, Northern Ireland
- Died: 20 May 1992 (aged 72)
- Party: Northern Ireland Conservative (1980s – 1992); UPNI (1974 – 1981)
- Other political affiliations: Ulster Unionist Party (1938; 1970 – 1974); Unofficial Unionist (1969 – 1970)

Robert Lloyd Hall-Thompson TD (9 April 1920 – 20 May 1992), known as Lloyd Hall-Thompson, was a Northern Irish unionist politician.

== Background ==
Born in Belfast, Hall-Thompson was the son of Samuel Hall-Thompson, and grandson of Rt. Hon. Robert Thompson MP. He studied at Campbell College in Belfast and joined the Ulster Unionist Party (UUP) in 1938. He was commissioned into the 8th Anti-Aircraft Regiment, Royal Artillery in 1939 and served during World War II, reaching the rank of Captain. For ten years from 1946, he served in the Territorial Army, reaching the rank of Major.

In 1969 Hall-Thompson standing as an unofficial Unionist supporting the more moderate policies of the Prime Minister of Northern Ireland Terence O'Neill, unseated the incumbent Unionist MP for his father's old seat of Belfast Clifton in the Parliament of Northern Ireland. In September 1970, he rejoined the UUP.

Following the abolition of the Parliament, Hall-Thompson was elected to the 1973 Northern Ireland Assembly for Belfast North, representing the UUP. The following year, he became the leader of the Assembly and also the Executive's Chief Whip, before joining the Unionist Party of Northern Ireland. Under this new party designation, he was elected to the Northern Ireland Constitutional Convention of 1975.

Outside politics, Hall-Thompson was involved in horse breeding.

Late in life, Hall-Thompson joined the Conservative Party, and in 1988 he became the Chair of the Lagan Valley Conservative Association.

Parliament of Northern Ireland
Preceded by William James Morgan	Member of Parliament for Belfast Clifton; 1969–1973	Parliament abolished
Northern Ireland Assembly (1973)
New assembly	Assembly Member for North Belfast; 1973–1974	Assembly abolished
Northern Ireland Constitutional Convention
New convention	Member for North Belfast; 1975–1976	Convention dissolved
