= Independent Unionist Association =

Defunct political party in Northern Ireland

The Independent Unionist Association or Independent Unionist Party was a political party in Northern Ireland.

The organisation was founded in 1937, shortly before the announcement of the 1938 Northern Ireland general election. It consisted of a disparate group of independent Unionists, and included member of the Northern Ireland House of Commons Tommy Henderson. The party called for more action to relieve unemployment, and for tighter control of government spending. William McConnell Wilton was elected as chairman of the new organisation.

The party stood several candidates in the general election, including Henderson in Belfast Shankill and Wilton in Belfast Clifton. The Ulster Unionist Party claimed that the Independent Unionist challenge made a united Ireland more likely, a charge which Henderson described as "a deliberate attempt to fool the Ulster people". Only Henderson was elected for the group at the general election.

The party launched a monthly newspaper in January 1939, aiming to appeal to both their own supporters, and to those of the Ulster Progressive Unionist Association. By the 1945 Northern Ireland general election, the party was greatly weakened, but supported Henderson and also John William Nixon in Belfast Woodvale. Later in the year, Wilton was elected to serve in the Senate of Northern Ireland. The party then faded from view, although an "Independent Unionist Association" in Belfast released a manifesto in 1954 on a similar platform.
