= Robert Thompson (Irish politician) =

Politician from Northern Ireland (1839–1918)

Member of Parliament for Belfast North
- In office January 1910 – 1918
- Preceded by: George Clark
- Succeeded by: Constituency abolished

Personal details
- Born: 1839 County Antrim, Ireland
- Died: 1918 (aged 78–79) Belfast
- Party: Ulster Unionist
- Children: Samuel Hall-Thompson
- Relatives: Lloyd Hall-Thompson (grandson)

Robert Thompson PC (Ire) JP DL (1839–1918) was an Irish member of parliament in the United Kingdom of Great Britain and Ireland. He represented Belfast North from January 1910 until 1918.

Educated at Wellington Academy, Belfast, he later worked for Lindsay & Co. Ltd. eventually taking over and running the renamed Lindsay, Thompson & Co. Ltd., flax spinners. He was President of Ulster Flax Spinners' Association and President of the Board of Governors of Campbell College in Belfast. He also was Chairman of Belfast Harbour Commissioners and he often travelled abroad with Lord Pirrie of Harland & Wolff and Bruce Ismay of the White Star Line.

He lived at Bertha House, 71 Malone Road, Belfast (demolished late 1990s) and at Drum House, Drumbeg, County Down. Thompson's son, Samuel Hall-Thompson and grandson, Lloyd Hall-Thompson, also served as MPs.

Thompson died in 1918 and is buried in Belfast City Cemetery.

Parliament of the United Kingdom
Preceded by George Clark	Member of Parliament for Belfast North; January 1910–1918	Constituency abolished
