= Harry Diamond (politician) =

Northern Irish politician (1908–1996)

Harry Diamond (1908–1996) was a socialist and an Irish nationalist. He was the MP for Belfast Falls in the Parliament of Northern Ireland, and later the leader of the Republican Labour Party.

In 1927, Diamond was the main initiator and first chairman of O'Donnell's GAA. He later became chairman of Antrim GAA.

Diamond was an active nationalist before the Second World War and in 1933 was sentenced to a month in jail for refusing to pay a fine given out for addressing an illegal rally in support of republican prisoners. The following year, he stood in the Belfast Central by-election as an "Anti-Partition" candidate.

In 1944, Diamond became a founder member of the Socialist Republican Party. He took the Belfast Falls seat at the 1945 Northern Ireland general election. In May 1946 Diamond laid a wreath at the grave of Seán McCaughey, the recently deceased Irish Republican hunger striker. In 1949, no one else contested the seat, and he remained the Socialist Republican Party's only MP, but the party disbanded that year. While most of its members joined the Irish Labour Party, Diamond held his seat, until 1964 as an independent standing as "Republican Labour".

In 1964, Diamond joined with Gerry Fitt to found the Republican Labour Party. He stood for the Westminster constituency of Belfast West in the October 1964 general election, but was defeated by James Kilfedder. The campaign was disfigured by riots after Ian Paisley attempted to lead a Unionist crowd up Divis Street to remove an Irish tricolour from the offices of Sinn Féin, who were supporting the candidacy of Billy McMillen. The riots galvanised the Unionist vote while the nationalist vote was split between Diamond and McMillen. Diamond alleged that the official Ulster Unionist Party had colluded in this.

Diamond saw a strong challenge to his position from the resurgent Northern Ireland Labour Party (NILP) in the late 1960s, and was criticised for being inattentive to his constituents' needs. Paddy Devlin of the NILP, a former supporter of the reformists in the Belfast branch of the Irish Labour Party, defeated him in the 1969 Northern Ireland general election.

In 1970, Fitt left the Republican Labour Party to found the broader-based Social Democratic and Labour Party. Paddy Kennedy assumed the leadership, but the party was in terminal decline and disbanded in 1973.

Parliament of Northern Ireland
Preceded by Eamon Donnelly	Member of Parliament for Belfast Falls; 1945–1969	Succeeded by Paddy Devlin
