= Desmond Boal =

Politician and barrister from Northern Ireland

Desmond Boal QC

Chairman of the Democratic Unionist Party
- In office 1971–1973
- Leader: Ian Paisley
- Preceded by: Office Created
- Succeeded by: William Beattie

Member of Parliament for Belfast Shankill
- In office 1960–1972
- Preceded by: Henry Holmes
- Succeeded by: Office abolished

Personal details
- Born: 8 August 1928 Derry, Northern Ireland
- Died: 23 April 2015 (aged 86) Holywood, Northern Ireland
- Party: Independent Unionist (from 1973)
- Other political affiliations: DUP (1971 - 1973); Ulster Unionist Party (before 1971)
- Spouse: Annette Boal
- Children: 3
- Education: Trinity College Dublin
- Occupation: Politician
- Profession: Barrister

Desmond Norman Orr Boal (8 August 1928 – 23 April 2015) was a Northern Irish unionist politician and barrister.

== Background ==
Boal had a legal career before he entered politics in 1960. He was the Ulster Unionist Party (UUP) Member of the Parliament of Northern Ireland for the Shankill constituency between 1960 and 1972. He was very critical of the leadership under Captain Terence O'Neill, then Prime Minister of Northern Ireland. Boal opposed the manner, if not the substance, of O'Neill's attempts at improving relations with both the Irish government and the Roman Catholic/Irish nationalist minority in Northern Ireland, along with many backbenchers.

Discontented with James Chichester-Clark and Brian Faulkner who came to government after O'Neill's 1969 fall from power, Boal resigned from the UUP in 1971 and joined Ian Paisley in establishing the Democratic Unionist Party (DUP) in order to provide dissident unionist opinion with a viable political alternative. He worked as the first chairman and one of the first public representatives of the DUP and continued to sit in Stormont during the years of 1971–1972. He later resumed his practice as a barrister.

Boal died in April 2015, aged 86.

Parliament of Northern Ireland
Preceded by Henry Holmes	Member of Parliament for Belfast Shankill; 1960–1973	Parliament abolished
Party political offices
New political party	Chairman of the Democratic Unionist Party; 1971–1973	Succeeded by William Beattie
