= Independent Labour Group =

See also the Independent Labour Party, which was active in Ireland in the early twentieth century.

The Independent Labour Group was a nationalist political party in Northern Ireland from the late 1950s to the mid-1960s. Sometimes known as the Independent Labour Party, it was formed in 1958 in Belfast by independent Labour MP Frank Hanna, with the support of various local Roman Catholic clerics. That year, the party wiped out the Irish Labour Party on Belfast City Council.

John Joseph Brennan stood under the party banner in Belfast West in the 1959 UK general election, where he received 37.6% of the votes cast, then stood in Belfast Falls in the 1962 Northern Ireland general election. Hanna continued to hold his Belfast Central seat for the organisation.

In the 1965 Northern Ireland general election, Brennan took over Hanna's seat, having joined the National Democratic Party, for which Brennan was elected; the remainder of the party appears to have joined or disintegrated by this point.
