= Coralie de Burgh =

British painter

Coralie de Burgh, Lady Kinahan
- Born: Coralie Isabel de Burgh; 16 September 1924
- Died: 31 July 2015 (aged 90)
- Occupation: Painter
- Spouse: Robin Kinahan
- Children: Danny Kinahan (son)
- Parent(s): Captain Charles de Burgh DSO; Isobel Caroline Berkeley

Coralie de Burgh, Lady Kinahan (16 September 1924 – 31 July 2015) was a British Irish painter who won a bronze medal at the 1948 Olympic Exhibition. Born Coralie Isabel de Burgh to Captain Charles de Burgh, DSO and Isobel Caroline Berkeley de Burgh, she died on 31 July 2015 aged 90. In 1950 she married Ulster Unionist MP Robin Kinahan, with whom she had five children. With her husband she bought and restored Castle Upton at Templepatrick as their family home. One of her children, Danny, is also an Ulster Unionist MP.
