= William Oliver (Northern Ireland politician) =

Politician

Member of Parliament for Belfast Dock
- In office 1958–1962
- Preceded by: Murtagh Morgan
- Succeeded by: Gerry Fitt

Personal details
- Born: 31 March 1899
- Died: 18 November 1973 (aged 74)

William Oliver (31 March 1899 - 18 November 1973) was an Irish shopkeeper and politician. He was the Member of the Northern Ireland Parliament (MP) for Belfast Dock for the Ulster Unionist Party from 1958 to 1962. Spouse: Lilian Kate Wainwright (31 December 1900 - June 1964) - issue Kathleen, William, Diane, Rosemary & Terence.

Parliament of Northern Ireland
Preceded by Murtagh Morgan	Member of Parliament for Belfast Dock; 1958–1962	Succeeded by Gerry Fitt
