= Richard Byrne (politician) =

Richard Byrne (died 28 August 1942) was an Irish nationalist politician in Northern Ireland.

Byrne worked as a publican and was also a landlord. He was elected to Belfast City Council in 1910, serving until his death. At the 1921 Northern Ireland general election, Byrne unsuccessfully contested Belfast West.

Byrne contested Belfast Falls at the 1929 Northern Ireland general election against William McMullen. This came with the reluctant support of party leader Joseph Devlin, who described Byrne as a "Tory" and an "old pisspot". The contest was bitter, with Northern Ireland Labour Party opponent Billy McMullen producing a newspaper, the Northern Worker, claiming that Byrne was a slum landlord. Byrne secured an injunction to stop distribution two days before the election, and beat McMullen by around 1,400 votes.

From 1937 until his death, Byrne and Thomas Joseph Campbell were the only Nationalist Party members to regularly attend the Northern Ireland Parliament. Byrne held the seat until his death in 1942.

Parliament of Northern Ireland
New constituency	Member of Parliament for Belfast Falls; 1929–1942	Succeeded by Eamon Donnelly
