= Samuel Hall-Thompson =

Lt-Col. Samuel Hall-Thompson (1885 – 26 October 1954) was a Unionist politician from Northern Ireland.

Hall-Thompson was born at Crawfordsburn in Ulster. He studied at Dulwich College, England. His father, Rt. Hon. Robert Thompson, DL, was also an MP. Samuel went into business and, in 1929, served as High Sheriff of Belfast.

At the 1929 Northern Ireland general election, Hall-Thompson was elected as the Ulster Unionist Party Member of Parliament for Belfast Clifton. In 1939, he was appointed chief ordnance officer for Northern Ireland, and from 1944 until 1950 he served as minister of education. This position carried with it membership of the Privy Council of Northern Ireland. Hall-Thompson suffered criticism from some Unionists for appearing to compromise with the Roman Catholic Church while in this position. He was not a member of the Orange Order.

In 1950, Hall-Thompson was appointed chairman of Ways and Means Committee and Deputy Speaker of the Northern Ireland House of Commons. At the 1953 general election, he was defeated by Norman Porter, an independent Unionist who had been an outspoken and stern critic.

Samuel's son, Lloyd Hall-Thompson, later became an MP in Northern Ireland.

Parliament of Northern Ireland
New constituency	Member of Parliament for Belfast Clifton; 1929–1953	Succeeded by Norman Porter
Civic offices
Preceded by Julia McMordie	High Sheriff of Belfast; 1929–1930	Succeeded by James McKinney
Political offices
Preceded by Robert Corkey	Minister of Education; 1944–1950	Succeeded by Harry Midgley
Preceded by Robert Nichol Wilson	Chairman of Ways and Means and Deputy Speaker of the Northern Ireland House of Commons; 1950–1953	Succeeded by Terence O'Neill
