= Dock Labour Party =

Socialist political organization

The Dock Labour Party was a socialist political organisation which existed in the Dock ward in Belfast in the 1950s. Along with the "Diamond Labour Party" and "O'Sullivan Labour Party", the Dock Labour Party was a faction separate to the Northern Ireland Labour Party, which was unionist.

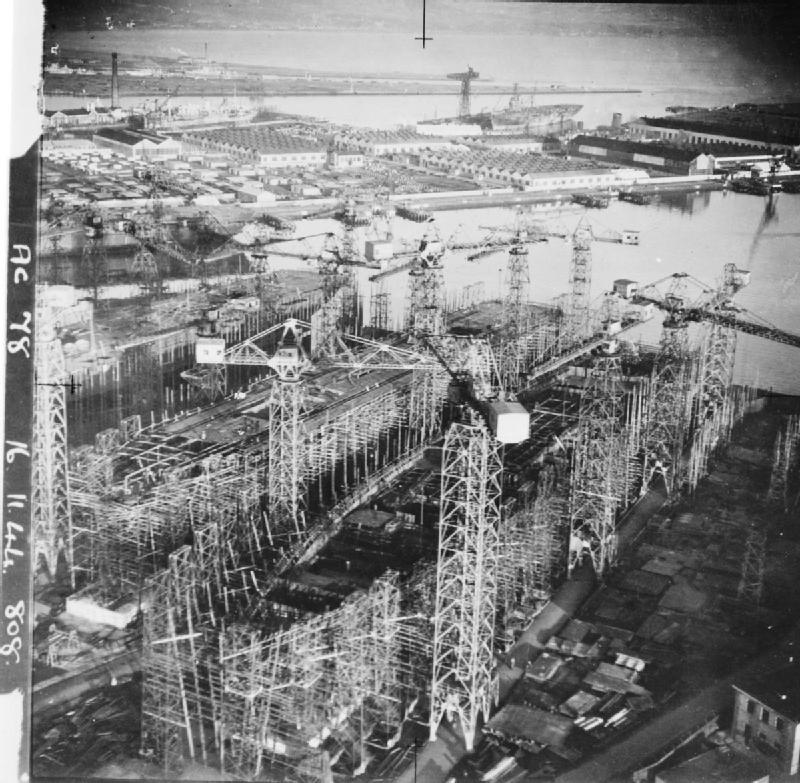
Shipbuilding in Belfast, 1944

Gerry Fitt was involved and stood as a candidate at one stage.
