= Paddy Kennedy (politician) =

Northern Irish politician (1942–1999)

Patrick Kennedy (3 September 1942 – 3 May 1999) was a Northern Irish politician.

== Career ==
Kennedy joined the Republican Labour Party (RLP) and was elected to Belfast City Council in 1967. He became involved in the civil rights protests and was a founder member of the Northern Ireland Civil Rights Association, and joined the Central Citizens Defence Committee. In the 1969 Northern Ireland general election, Kennedy was elected for Belfast Central.

In August 1969, during intensive rioting in his constituency, he tried, without success, to get the Royal Ulster Constabulary to withdraw the armoured cars and heavy machine guns they were using against the rioters. After the rioting, in which Catholic residents of mixed areas in Belfast were burned out, Defence Committees were formed to defend nationalist areas. In September 1969, Kennedy was the Falls Road Citizens Defence Committee's delegate in talks with James Callaghan.

In 1970, RLP leader Gerry Fitt left to help establish the Social Democratic and Labour Party. Kennedy was elected as the new leader of the RLP. The following year, he held a press conference in Belfast where he introduced Joe Cahill, a leading figure in the Provisional IRA, intending that this would show the ineffectiveness of internment. While successful as a media event, appearing with the IRA led many constitutional nationalist politicians to refuse to work with him.

In 1971, he withdrew from Stormont, which was suspended the following year. He stood unsuccessfully in Belfast West as a candidate for the Northern Ireland Assembly in 1973. As both he and Harry Diamond, the other RLP candidate, were defeated, it was decided to wind up the party. In the late 1970s, Kennedy moved to Dublin, where he trained as a barrister before becoming a planning consultant.

== Death ==
Kennedy died on 3 May 1999, aged 56.

== Sources ==
- Boothroyd, David. "Biographies of Members of the Northern Ireland House of Commons: Patrick Kennedy". Northern Ireland House of Commons Election Results. Archived from the original on 16 July 2013.
- Eamonn McCann (3 May 1999). "Obituary: Paddy Kennedy". The Guardian. Archived from the original on 15 July 2014.

Parliament of Northern Ireland
Preceded by John Joseph Brennan	Member of Parliament for Belfast Central; 1969–1973	Parliament abolished
Political offices
Preceded by Gerry Fitt	Leader of the Republican Labour Party; 1970–1973	Party disbanded
