= Robin Kinahan =

Northern Irish unionist politician and businessman

Sir Robin Kinahan

Lord Mayor of Belfast
- In office 1959–1961
- Preceded by: Cecil McKee
- Succeeded by: Martin Kelso Wallace

Member of Parliament for Belfast Clifton
- In office 1958–1959
- Preceded by: Norman Porter
- Succeeded by: William James Morgan

Personal details
- Born: 24 September 1916 Belfast, Ireland
- Died: 2 May 1997 (aged 80) Castle Upton, Northern Ireland
- Party: Ulster Unionist Party
- Spouse: Coralie de Burgh
- Profession: Businessman

Sir Robert George Caldwell Kinahan, ERD (24 September 1916 – 2 May 1997) was a Northern Irish unionist politician, businessman and a senior member of the Orange Order. In his obituary, he was described as one of the last of the "county elite" to remain a high-ranking member of the Orange Order during the turbulent years of The Troubles, when it became potentially dangerous to belong. In his personal life he deplored bigotry and was almost expelled from the Orange Order for having attended a Roman Catholic funeral service.

== Background ==
Born in Belfast to Henry Kinahan and Blanche Grierson Kinahan, daughter of the Bishop of Connor and Bishop of Down and Dromore, Robin Kinahan was educated at Stowe. Upon leaving school he went straight into the family firm with a Vintners' Company scholarship, which took him to Porto and Bordeaux, this facilitated his knowledge of wine and the French language.

== War years ==
During World War II he joined the Royal Artillery, the 8th (Belfast) Heavy Anti-Aircraft Regiment, serving briefly in France before the Dunkirk withdrawal, then in the air defence of Coventry and London before ending up in Burma under General Slim.

== Political career ==
Following the war he entered politics as councillor for Belfast Oldpark, where in 1948 he defeated Labour activist Billy Blease. In 1956 he was appointed High Sheriff of Belfast. He served in the Belfast Corporation for 10 years before becoming a Stormont Member of Parliament for Belfast Clifton, defeating the incumbent independent Unionist Norman Porter.

He was an MP for only a few months as he could not resist the opportunity to be lord mayor of Belfast. In 1961 he earned the knighthood which accompanied the lord mayorship at that time. He was Lord Mayor from 1959 to 1961, the youngest person to have done so at that time. In 1969, he was appointed High Sheriff of Antrim.

== Orange Order ==
In the family firm, Lyle and Kinahan wine and spirit merchants, which was founded by his paternal grandfather, there was a large contingent of Catholic workers and Kinahan would often relate how, before The Troubles, they turned out to cheer him on 12 July as he walked with his lodge to the "field". He was almost expelled from the Orange Order for having attended a Roman Catholic funeral service.

== Personal life ==
In 1963, following his family firm being taken over in 1961, he acquired Castle Upton and 300 acres (1.2 km^{2}) for £53,000. He and his wife, Coralie de Burgh, an artist (and daughter of Captain Charles de Burgh, The Lodge, Seaforde, County Down), set about restoring it from an almost ruinous state. He and his wife had two sons and three daughters. His son, Danny Kinahan, was appointed to the Northern Ireland Assembly in 2009 and was a successful Ulster Unionist Party candidate in the 2011 Northern Ireland Assembly election having been elected to Antrim Borough Council in 2005. At the 2015 general election, Danny was elected MP for South Antrim.

== Later life ==
Unlike many Unionists he agreed, reluctantly, to serve on the short-lived Northern Ireland Advisory Commission, set up with seven Protestant and four Catholic members by William Whitelaw, Secretary of State for Northern Ireland, after the suspension of Stormont in 1972 and the imposition of direct rule. He served as chairman of the Ulster Bank (1970–1982) – he made a point of visiting every branch of the bank, vice Lord Lieutenant of Belfast (1976–1985), Lord Lieutenant of Belfast (1985–1991). He died at the age of 80.

== Publications ==
Behind Every Great Man …? (published in 1992)

Parliament of Northern Ireland
Preceded by Norman Porter	Member of Parliament for Belfast Clifton; 1958–1959	Succeeded by William James Morgan
Civic offices
Preceded by William Neill	High Sheriff of Belfast; 1955–1956	Succeeded by Walter H. Cooper
Preceded by Cecil McKee	Lord Mayor of Belfast; 1959–1961	Succeeded by Martin Kelso Wallace
Preceded by The Lord Glentoran	Lord Lieutenant of Belfast; 1985–1991	Succeeded by Eliott Wilson
