= Thomas Joseph Campbell =

Irish politician and judge (1871-1946)

T. J. Campbell KC

Leader of the Nationalist Party
- In office 1934–1945
- Preceded by: Joseph Devlin
- Succeeded by: James McSparran

Member of the Northern Ireland Parliament for Belfast Central
- In office 1934–1945
- Preceded by: Joseph Devlin
- Succeeded by: Frank Hanna

Member of the Senate of Northern Ireland
- In office 1929–1934
- Preceded by: Harold Barbour
- Succeeded by: John Clements Glendinning

Personal details
- Born: 14 December 1871 Belfast, Ireland
- Died: 3 May 1946 (aged 74) Belfast, Northern Ireland
- Party: Nationalist Party
- Spouse: Norah Gilfedder (m. 1918)
- Children: 5
- Education: Royal University of Ireland; Inns of Court; King's Inns
- Profession: Barrister, judge

Thomas Joseph Campbell (14 December 1871 – 3 May 1946), known as T. J. Campbell, was an Irish politician, barrister, journalist, author and judge.

== Early life and education ==
Campbell was born in Belfast on 14 December 1871. He studied at St Malachy's College and the Royal University of Ireland. He was awarded a BA in 1892, his LL.B in 1894 and an MA in 1897. In 1895, he began editing The Irish News, a local Belfast-based newspaper. In 1899, he was the Chairman of the Ulster District Institute of Journalists.

== Legal career ==
In 1900 Campbell was called to the Irish Bar (King's Inns) and the English Bar in 1904. He lived in Dublin between 1910 and 1922 in order to practice his legal career at the Four Courts. In 1918 he was appointed as a King's Counsel and became a Bencher of King's Inns in 1924, the last before the erection of a separate Inn for Northern Ireland. Campbell was the first Treasurer of the Bar of Northern Ireland and first Secretary of the Circuit of Northern Ireland.

A close friend of Joseph Devlin MP, Campbell was a supporter of John Redmond MP and stood for the Irish Parliamentary Party in South Monaghan at the 1918 general election. He lost the election to Sinn Féin's Sean McEntee (then in prison and later Finance Minister in the first De Valera led Government in the Irish Republic).

Described as "a man of markedly moderate views", Campbell was appointed in 1929 to the Senate of Northern Ireland. At the 1931 general election, he stood unsuccessfully for the Nationalist Party in Belfast West. In 1934, he was elected to the Parliament of Northern Ireland in a by-election as Stormont MP for Belfast Central, resigning his seat in the Senate. He was elected unopposed in Belfast Central in the general elections of 1938 and 1945.

== Politician ==
From 1937, he and Richard Byrne were the only Nationalist Party MPs to regularly attend the Stormont Parliament, and after Byrne's death in 1942, he was a lone voice against abstentionism in his own party.

From the Senate in 1931 he successfully introduced the only nationalist-sponsored Stormont bill, the Wild Birds Protection Act. Described as an "old friend and political opponent" by Lord Craigavon, he was chairman of the Public Accounts Committee.

Campbell has been described as having a "Redmondite approach and rigid attachment to attendance and parliamentary etiquette (which) ruled him out as a unifying influence" on his own party after the death of its leader Devlin. ** Campbell opposed the use of violence to achieve political ends throughout his political career.

His book Fifty Years Of Ulster (1941) was mainly about his work as a barrister, but he also predicted the difficulties which would eventually befall the Stormont Parliament:

"If a minority anywhere are to regard themselves as condemned to be in a permanent minority in Parliament with no inducement to tempt ambition or ability into their ranks they will inevitably become discouraged and indifferent. A Parliamentary constitution depends on the continuance of parties and if this factor is eliminated the constitution will of itself cease to exist. Parliamentary government will fall into contempt. The system will collapse".

He said of his attendance at the Stormont Parliament "I went there of duty, not of desire". In November 1945, he resigned his Belfast Central seat and retired from politics in order to take up a position as a County Court Judge.

== Personal life ==
He married Norah Gilfedder on 11 February 1918 in St Patrick's Church, Belfast and had five children, one daughter and four sons one of whom – Joseph – became a priest of the Diocese of Down and Connor.

== Sources ==
- T.J. Campbell, Fifty Years Of Ulster 1890–1940
- Michael Farrell, Northern Ireland: The Orange State
- Eamon Phoenix (1994), Northern Nationalism: Nationalist Politics, Partition and the Catholic Minority in Northern Ireland, 1890–1940.Ulster Historical Foundation, ISBN 978-0901905550
- Northern Ireland Parliamentary Elections Results: Biographies

Parliament of Northern Ireland
Preceded by Joseph Devlin	Member of Parliament for Belfast Central; 1934–1945	Succeeded by Frank Hanna
Party political offices
Preceded by Joe Devlin	Leader of the Nationalist Party at Stormont; 1934–1945	Succeeded by James McSparran
