= Socialist Republican Party (Ireland) =

- Leader: Harry Diamond
- Founded: 1944
- Dissolved: 1950
- Merged into: Labour Party (Ireland)
- Newspaper: Northern Star
- Ideology: Socialism; Irish republicanism

The Socialist Republican Party was an Irish republican political party in Northern Ireland. It was founded in 1944 by a coalition of former Nationalist Party members, former Irish Republican Army (IRA) members and Protestant trade unionists around Victor Halley, all based in West Belfast.

The party produced a newspaper, Northern Star, edited by Vincent MacDowell (father of former Green MEP Nuala Ahern) who would go on to be active at various times in the Northern Ireland Civil Rights Association, the Green Party for which he was elected a councillor and the Irish Labour Party.

In the 1945 Northern Ireland general election, the party won 5,497 votes and Harry Diamond took the Belfast Falls seat. He held the seat in 1949, with no other candidate contesting it.

== Merge into the Irish Labour Party ==
In February 1949, on the advice of the administrative council of the Irish Labour Party, the Socialist Republican Party and disaffected members of the Northern Ireland Labour Party (NILP) set up a provisional committee on establishing a branch of the Irish Labour Party in Northern Ireland. Later that April, a 'six counties council' was set up to co-ordinate a merger into the Irish Labour Party pending the October 1949 party convention to amend the constitution to permit expansion into Northern Ireland.

The council consisted of:

- Harry Diamond – Chairman
- Frank Hanna – Vice-Chairman
- Jack Beattie – Treasurer
- Jack Macgoughan – Secretary

Within nine days however, Frank Hanna resigned from the council expressing doubts about the feasibility of a merger and about public support for the party. On 8 January 1950 the merger was complete when the 'six counties council' was abolished and replaced with a regional council within the Irish Labour Party.

Diamond later stood for Parliament under a variety of labels before eventually forming the Republican Labour Party.

== Election results ==
=== General elections ===
Election	First-preference votes	FPv%	Seats
1945	5,497	1.5	1 / 52
1949	N/A (elected unopposed)	N/A	1 / 52
