= Federation of Labour (Ireland) =

Northern Irish political party

The Federation of Labour (Ireland) was a small nationalist political party in Northern Ireland.

It was founded in 1944 by much of the Belfast West branch of the Northern Ireland Labour Party (NILP), opposed to that group's acceptance of the partition of Ireland and movement towards unionism.

The party was led by James Collins, and from 1945 by Jack Beattie, the Member of Parliament for Belfast West, who had initially been elected for the NILP, but had since become an independent Labour representative.

The group stood in the 1945 Northern Ireland general election, but failed to see any of its candidates other than Beattie elected. In 1949, it merged into the newly formed Northern Section of the Irish Labour Party.
