= Gerry Fitt =

Northern Irish politician (1926–2005)

The Right Honourable The Lord Fitt

1st Deputy Chief Executive of Northern Ireland
- In office 1 January 1974 – 28 May 1974
- Monarch: Queen Elizabeth II
- Chief Executive: Brian Faulkner
- Preceded by: Position established
- Succeeded by: Position abolished

Leader of the Social Democratic and Labour Party
- In office 20 August 1970 – 6 May 1979
- Deputy: John Hume
- Preceded by: Position established
- Succeeded by: John Hume

Member of Parliament for Belfast West
- In office 31 March 1966 – 13 May 1983
- Preceded by: James Kilfedder
- Succeeded by: Gerry Adams

Member of the House of Lords
- Lord Temporal
- Life peerage 14 October 1983 – 26 August 2005

Personal details
- Born: 9 April 1926 Belfast, Northern Ireland
- Died: 26 August 2005 (aged 79) London, England
- Party: Independent (1979–2005)
- Other political affiliations: Dock Labour Party (1950s); Irish Labour (to 1964); Republican Labour (1964–1970); SDLP (1970–1979)
- Spouse: Ann Fitt
- Children: 6

Military service
- Allegiance: United Kingdom
- Branch/service: Merchant Navy
- Years of service: 1941–1953
- Battles/wars: World War II

Gerard Fitt, Baron Fitt (9 April 1926 – 26 August 2005), was a politician from Belfast, Northern Ireland. He was a founder and the first leader of the Social Democratic and Labour Party (SDLP), a social democratic and Irish nationalist party.

== Early years ==
Fitt was born in Belfast in the Lisburn Road Workhouse to the unmarried Rose Martin on 8 April 1926. He was christened Gerald in the infirmary at the Workhouse by Fr JB Murray, a curate at St Brigid's Church. He was subsequently adopted by George and Mary Fitt and assumed their name; however, he changed his first name to Gerard. When he did so is not recorded, but written evidence shows he was using his new name by 1942. He was educated at a local Christian Brothers school. He served in the Merchant Navy as a stoker until 1953, having joined in 1941 during World War II and served on convoy duty. He witnessed the sinking of HMS Bluebell from which there was one survivor. His elder brother George, an Irish Guardsman, was killed during the Battle of Normandy.

Living in the nationalist Beechmount neighbourhood of the Falls, he stood for the Falls as a candidate for the Dock Labour Party in a city council by-election in 1956, but lost to Paddy Devlin of the Irish Labour Party, who would later be his close ally. In 1958, he was elected to Belfast City Council as a member of the Irish Labour Party.

== 1960s ==
In 1962, he won a Stormont seat from the Ulster Unionist Party, becoming the only Irish Labour member. Two years later, he left Irish Labour and joined with Harry Diamond, the sole Socialist Republican Party Stormont MP, to form the Republican Labour Party.

At the 1966 general election, Fitt won the Belfast West seat in the Westminster parliament. The Northern Ireland Civil Rights Association (NICRA) was launched in 1967 with Fitt as a prominent spokesperson for the movement.

Following his election to Westminster, Fitt became a prominent member of the Campaign for Democracy in Ulster (CDU) and repeatedly attempted to raise issues regarding civil rights in Northern Ireland during debates in the House of Commons. On 28 August 1968, he tabled a House of Commons motion, signed by 60 Labour Party backbenchers, criticising RUC action in Dungannon on 24 August at the first civil rights march in Northern Ireland, demanding that: "citizens of Northern Ireland should be allowed the same rights of peaceful demonstration as those in other parts of the United Kingdom".

Many sympathetic MPs were present at the civil rights march in Derry on 5 October 1968 when Fitt and others were beaten by the Royal Ulster Constabulary. RTÉ's film, in which Fitt featured prominently, of the police baton charge on the peaceful, but illegal, demonstration drew world attention to the claims of the Northern Ireland Civil Rights Association.

The following year, Fitt announced at a press conference subsequent to the August 1969 rioting in Belfast that disturbance were created by a decision to "take some action to try to draw off the forces engaged in the Bogside area."

Fitt also supported the 1969 candidacy of Bernadette Devlin in the Mid Ulster by-election who ran as an anti-abstentionist 'Unity' candidate. Devlin's success greatly increased the authority of Fitt in the eyes of many British commentators, particularly as it produced a second voice on the floor of the British House of Commons who challenged the Unionist viewpoint at a time when Harold Wilson and other British ministers were beginning to take notice. In his maiden speech, he called for an inquiry into the unionist government of Northern Ireland.

Fitt was elected as a socialist republican and unveiled a plaque at the house on the Falls Road where James Connolly, the socialist leader of the Irish Easter Rising had lived. He was anxious to build a broader movement that would challenge Unionist hegemony. At the same time, a new generation of Catholics, many with secondary education and university degrees for the first time as a consequence of the post-War creation of the welfare state, were determined to make their voices heard.

== 1970s ==
In August 1970, Fitt became the first leader of a coalition of civil rights and nationalist leaders who created the Social Democratic and Labour Party (SDLP). The party was founded on high hopes – rejecting abstentionism and containing a number of prominent Protestants and without the stigma of conservatism and impotency that surrounded the old nationalist party. But already by then Northern Ireland was charging headlong towards near-civil war and the majority of unionists remained hostile.

After the collapse of Stormont in 1972 and the establishment of the Northern Ireland Assembly in 1973 he became deputy chief executive of the short-lived Power-Sharing Executive created by the Sunningdale Agreement. 1 January 1974 was a historic day with the power-sharing Executive taking office. The years of Unionist single-party rule had come to an end with the SDLP and Alliance parties joining the Executive alongside the Brian Faulkner wing of Unionism. Arguments still rage over the extent to which Fitt, as opposed to John Hume, helped shape the agreement. Fitt certainly was becoming less engaged with the nationalist concerns of the majority of the SDLP.

Within the nationalist community, the Provisionals condemned the powersharing agreement as falling short of British withdrawal and a united Ireland. A majority of Unionists opposed the Sunningdale agreement and the Executive collapsed when confronted by the Ulster Workers Council strike.

The SDLP had developed a political strategy of calling for powersharing within Northern Ireland alongside the adoption of an all-Ireland dimension. Fitt had always seen powersharing as the priority and he felt the calls for an all-Ireland dimension were alienating Unionists while promising little. In the aftermath of the collapse of the Executive, the British Government became less hopeful of achieving powersharing and, as a result, the all-Ireland dimension became the bigger policy priority for the SDLP.

Fitt became increasingly unhappy with what he saw as the SDLP's shift towards green nationalism and its emphasis on the all-Ireland dimension. He also became more outspoken in his condemnation of the Provisional Irish Republican Army. He became a target for republican sympathisers in 1976 when they attacked his home.

Fitt became disillusioned with the handling of Northern Ireland by the British government. Labour's Northern Ireland Secretary of State Roy Mason spent little time and effort on local political initiatives instead opting for a strategy of criminalisation and attempting to militarily defeat the IRA. This policy shift resulted in growing complaints of mistreatment of prisoners. The minority Labour Government was relying on Unionist votes in Parliament to survive and promised extra Westminster seats for Northern Ireland, which pointed to integration with Britain instead of devolved powersharing as the Government's emerging political preference. In 1979, Fitt abstained from a crucial vote in the House of Commons which brought down the Labour government, citing the way that the government had failed to help the nationalist population and tried to form a deal with the Ulster Unionist Party: "under no circumstances will I support the Labour government in a vote of confidence because of the attitude of the Secretary of State and the policies of the government in Northern Ireland".

As the 1970s were coming to a close, Fitt believed that the SDLP had changed and had become simply a "Catholic nationalist party". He increasingly felt isolated within the party with Fortnight, a Belfast current affairs magazine, describing him at the time as the "only Labour man" left.

In 1979, Gerry Fitt left the party altogether after he had agreed to constitutional talks with British Secretary of State Humphrey Atkins without any provision for an 'Irish dimension' and had then seen his decision overturned by the SDLP party conference. Like Paddy Devlin before him, he claimed the SDLP had ceased to be a socialist force.

== 1980s ==
Gerry Fitt enters the 1980s no longer a member of the SDLP but is still the MP for West Belfast. Politics in nationalist communities were about to change as the prison protests over political status became the hunger strikes and Provisional Sinn Féin make a strategic turn towards electoral politics.

In 1981, Fitt opposed the hunger strikes in the Maze prison in Belfast. In April of that year, he contacted the Northern Ireland Office to seek assurances that the British government would not give in to the hunger strikers' demands for political status. In the Westminster parliament, he urged the Conservative Government "not to make the mistake of granting political status".

The following month, May 1981, Fitt lost his seat on Belfast City Council to Fergus O'Hare, a member of the left-wing Peoples Democracy group and a prominent campaigner for political status and rights for the prisoners in the H Blocks. The loss of his seat on Belfast Council where he had been a prominent and long serving member, was to signal the beginning of Gerry Fitt's electoral decline.

Fitt's seat in Westminster was targeted by Sinn Féin as well as by the SDLP. In June 1983, he lost his seat in Belfast West to Gerry Adams, in part due to competition from an SDLP candidate. Fitt, standing as an Independent Socialist with no party machine behind him and with widespread nationalist criticism over his stance on the H Block hunger strikes, still received over 10,326 votes but he lost the seat to Gerry Adams who polled 16,379 votes with the SDLP's Joe Hendron coming second with 10,934 votes.

The following month, on 14 October 1983, he was created a UK life peer as Baron Fitt, of Bell's Hill in the County of Down. (The Fitt family were evacuated to Bell's Hill during the Belfast Blitz.) His Belfast Antrim Road home, close to the republican New Lodge, was firebombed a month after he was made a peer and he moved to live in London.

== Later career ==
In his later life he was an active member of the House of Lords, where he was strongly critical of some aspects of the political developments of Northern Ireland. Until the appointment of Margaret Ritchie in 2019 he was unique in that he was the only nationalist or republican from Northern Ireland to have been elevated to the House of Lords.

== Political beliefs ==
Although Fitt was initially considered a nationalist politician, his career often defied the traditional terms used for the discussion of Northern Irish politics. He sometimes said that he considered himself first and foremost a socialist politician rather than a nationalist. For example, on 11 October 1974 he stated, "In Northern Ireland it is very difficult to be a socialist without being labelled a Unionist socialist or an anti-partitionist socialist, but I am a socialist....".

== Death ==
Lord Fitt died on 26 August 2005, at the age of 79, after a long history of heart disease, a widower survived by five of his daughters, one having predeceased him. When his daughters had campaigned for him in elections, they were nicknamed 'the Miss Fitts'.

== See also ==
- List of Northern Ireland Members of the House of Lords

== Sources ==
- Devlin, Paddy (1993). Straight Left: An Autobiography. Belfast: The Blackstaff Press. ISBN 9780856405143.
- McKittrick, David; McVea, David (2012). Making Sense of the Troubles: A History of the Northern Ireland Conflict (Revised ed.). London: Viking. ISBN 9780241962657.
- Murphy, Michael (2007). Gerry Fitt – A Political Chameleon. Cork: Mercier Press. ISBN 9781856355315.
- Ryder, Chris (2006). Fighting Fitt. Belfast: Brehon Press. ISBN 1905474113.

Parliament of Northern Ireland
Preceded by William Oliver	Member of Parliament for Belfast Dock; 1962–1973	Parliament abolished
Parliament of the United Kingdom
Preceded by James Kilfedder	Member of Parliament for Belfast West; 1966–1983	Succeeded by Gerry Adams
Northern Ireland Assembly (1973)
New assembly	Assembly Member for North Belfast; 1973–1974	Assembly abolished
Northern Ireland Constitutional Convention
New convention	Member for North Belfast; 1975–1976	Convention dissolved
Party political offices
New political party	Leader of the Republican Labour Party; 1964–1970	Succeeded by Patrick Kennedy
New political party	Leader of the Social Democratic and Labour Party; 1970–1979	Succeeded by John Hume
