= 1938 Northern Ireland general election =

- 9 February 1938

All 52 seats to the House of Commons of Northern Ireland 27 seats were needed for a majority

	First party	Second party
Leader	Viscount Craigavon	Thomas Campbell
Party	UUP	Nationalist
Leader since	7 June 1921	18 January 1934
Leader's seat	North Down	Belfast Central
Last election	36 seats, 43.5%	9 seats, 13.2%
Seats won	39 (Note: Includes 14 members elected unopposed.)	8 (Note: Includes 6 members elected unopposed.)
Seat change	▲3	▼1
Popular vote	187,684 (Note: Voting only took place in 31 of 52 seats. The other 21 MPs were unopposed.)	16,167
Percentage	56.8%	4.9%
Swing	▲13.3%	▼8.3%
	Third party	Fourth party
Leader	William Wilton	Harry Midgley
Party	Ind. Unionist Party	NI Labour
Leader since	1937	1933
Leader's seat	Belfast Oldpark (Defeated)	Belfast Dock (Defeated)
Last election	Did not stand	2 seats, 8.5%
Seats won	1	1 (Note: The only Labour MP was elected unopposed.)
Seat change	▲1	▼1
Popular vote	28,459	18,775
Percentage	8.6%	5.7%
Swing	New party	▼2.8%
- Election results by constituency
Prime Minister before election
James Craig
UUP
Prime Minister after election
James Craig
UUP

The 1938 Northern Ireland general election was held on 9 February 1938. Like all previous elections to the Parliament of Northern Ireland, it produced a large majority for the Ulster Unionist Party, who won three-quarters of the seats.

The newly formed Ulster Progressive Unionist Association came second in vote share, but won no seats. 21 MPs were elected unopposed (40%), the vast majority of whom were Ulster Unionists.

== Results ==
↓
39	8	2	3
UUP	Nationalist	IU	Oth

1938 Northern Ireland general election
Party	Candidates						Votes		
Party	Stood	Elected	Gained	Unseated	Net	% of total	%	No.	Net %
UUP	43	39	3	0	+3	75.0	56.8	187,684	+13.3
Progressive Unionist	10	0	0	0	0	—	12.4	41,028	N/A
Ind. Unionist Party	6	1	1	0	+1	1.9	8.6	28,459	N/A
Ind. Unionist	5	2	1	2	-1	3.8	6.8	22,354	-14.5
NI Labour	7	1	1	2	-1	1.9	5.7	18,775	-2.8
Nationalist	9	8	0	1	-1	15.4	4.9	16,167	-8.3
Independent	3	0	0	0	0	—	2.2	7,482	+2.0
Independent Labour	1	1	1	0	+1	1.9	1.7	5,480	N/A
Ind. Progressive Unionist	1	0	0	0	0	—	0.9	2,926	N/A

Electorate: 825,101 (464,860 in contested seats); Turnout: 71.1% (330,355).

=== Seat changes ===
Constituency	From	To
Belfast Dock	NI Labour	UUP
Belfast Pottinger	NI Labour	Independent Labour
Belfast Shankill	Ind. Unionist	Ind. Unionist Party
Mourne	Nationalist	UUP
Queen's University of Belfast	Ind. Unionist	UUP
South Armagh	Ind. Nationalist	NI Labour
South Down	Fianna Fáil	Ind. Unionist

=== Votes summary ===
Popular vote
Ulster Unionist	56.81%
Progressive Unionist	12.42%
Ind. Unionist Association	8.61%
Ind. Unionist	6.77%
Labour	5.68%
Nationalist Party	4.89%
Independent	2.26%
Independent Labour	1.66%
Ind. Progressive Unionist	0.89%

=== Seats summary ===
Parliamentary seats
Ulster Unionist	75.00%
Nationalist Party	15.38%
Ind. Unionist	3.85%
Labour	1.92%
Ind. Unionist Association	1.92%
Independent Labour	1.92%

=== Contested seats ===
Only 31 of the 52 seats (60%) were actually contested.

1938 Northern Ireland general election (contested seats)
Party	Popular vote		Candidates		
Party	Votes	%	Stood	Elected	%
Ulster Unionist	187,684	56.8	29	25	80.6
Progressive Unionist	41,028	12.4	10	0	—
Ind. Unionist Party	28,459	8.6	6	1	3.2
Ind. Unionist	22,354	6.8	5	2	6.5
Labour	18,775	5.7	6	0	—
Nationalist	16,167	4.9	3	2	6.5
Independent	7,482	2.2	3	0	—
Ind. Labour	5,480	1.7	1	1	3.2
Ind. Progressive Unionist	2,926	0.9	1	0	—
Total	330,355	71.1	64	31	—

=== Uncontested seats ===
In 21 of the 52 seats (40%), only one candidate stood and they were elected unopposed without any votes cast. The vast majority of the MPs elected without a contest were Ulster Unionists.

1938 Northern Ireland general election (uncontested seats)
Party	Popular vote		Candidates		
Party	Votes	%	Stood	Elected	%
Ulster Unionist	Unopposed		14	14	66.7
Nationalist	Unopposed		6	6	28.6
Labour	Unopposed		1	1	4.8
Total			21	21	100
