= 1965 Northern Ireland general election =

- 25 November 1965

All 52 seats to the House of Commons of Northern Ireland 27 seats were needed for a majority
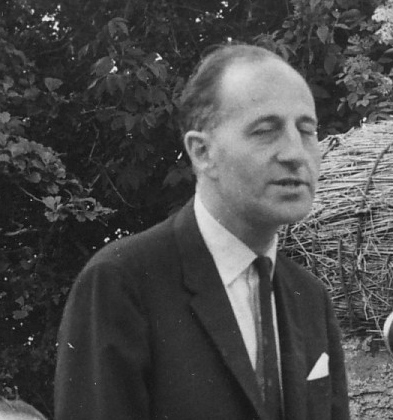
| | First party | Second party |
|---|---|---|
| | | Nat |
| Leader | Terence O'Neill | Eddie McAteer |
| Party | UUP | Nationalist |
| Leader since | 25 March 1963 | 2 June 1964 |
| Leader's seat | Bannside | Foyle |
| Last election | 34 seats, 48.8% | 9 seats, 15.1% |
| Seats won | 36 (Note: Includes 14 members elected unopposed.) | 9 (Note: Includes 5 members elected unopposed.) |
| Seat change | ▲2 | Steady |
| Popular vote | 191,896 (Note: Voting only took place in 29 of 52 seats. The other 23 MPs were unopposed.) | 26,748 |
| Percentage | 59.1% | 8.2% |
| Swing | ▲10.3% | ▼6.9% |
| | Third party | Fourth party |
| Leader | Tom Boyd | Gerry Fitt |
| Party | NI Labour | Republican Labour |
| Leader since | 1958 | 1964 |
| Leader's seat | Belfast Pottinger | Belfast Dock |
| Last election | 4 seats, 25.4% | Did not exist |
| Seats won | 2 | 2 (Note: Includes 1 member elected unopposed.) |
| Seat change | ▼2 | ▲2 |
| Popular vote | 66,323 | 3,326 |
| Percentage | 20.4% | 1.0% |
| Swing | ▼5.0% | New party |
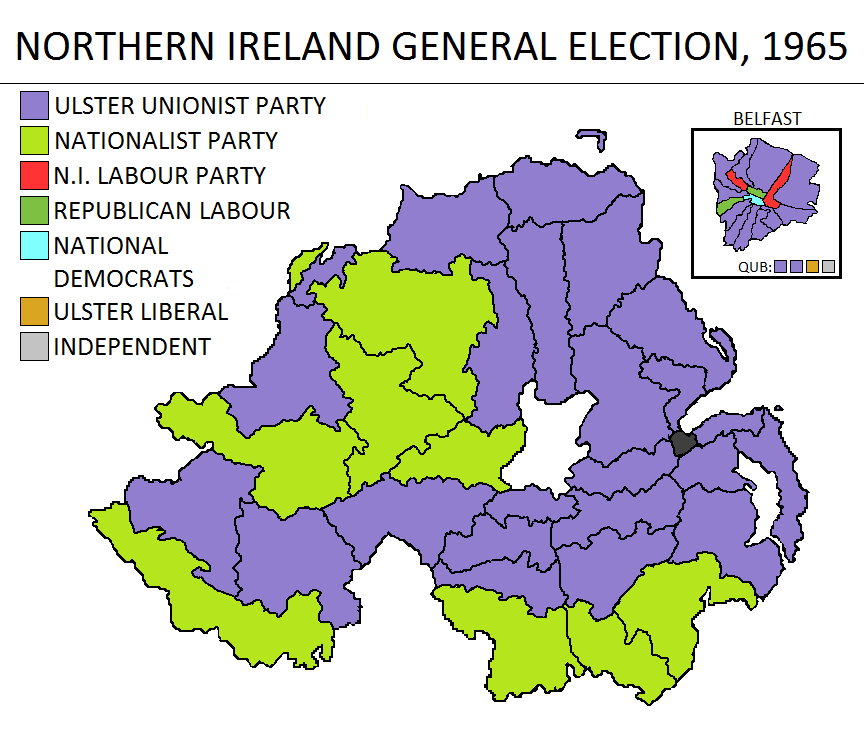
- Election results by constituency
Prime Minister before election
Terence O'Neill
UUP
Prime Minister after election
Terence O'Neill
UUP

The 1965 Northern Ireland general election was held on 25 November 1965. Like all previous elections to the Parliament of Northern Ireland, it produced a large majority of seats in the House of Commons of Northern Ireland for the Ulster Unionist Party.

== Results ==
↓
| 36 | 9 | 2 | 2 | 3 |
| UUP | Nationalist | L | R | Oth |

1965 Northern Ireland general election
| Party | Candidates | | | | | | Votes | | |
| Party | Stood | Elected | Gained | Unseated | Net | % of total | % | No. | Net % |
|---|---|---|---|---|---|---|---|---|---|
| UUP | 41 | 36 | 2 | 0 | +2 | 69.2 | 59.1 | 191,896 | +10.3 |
| NI Labour | 17 | 2 | 0 | 2 | -2 | 3.8 | 20.4 | 66,323 | -5.0 |
| Nationalist | 9 | 9 | 0 | 0 | 0 | 17.3 | 8.2 | 26,748 | -6.9 |
| National Democratic | 1 | 1 (Note: The sole NDP member was elected unopposed.) | 1 | 0 | +1 | 1.9 | 4.7 | 15,206 | N/A |
| Ulster Liberal | 4 | 1 (Note: The sole Liberal member was elected unopposed.) | 0 | 0 | 0 | 1.9 | 3.9 | 12,618 | +0.3 |
| Independent Labour | 1 | 0 | 0 | 0 | 0 | — | 1.4 | 4,371 | -1.7 |
| Republican Labour | 2 | 2 | 1 | 0 | +2 | 3.8 | 1.0 | 3,326 | N/A |
| New Ireland Movement | 1 | 0 | 0 | 0 | 0 | — | 1.0 | 3,111 | N/A |
| Ind. Republican | 1 | 0 | 0 | 0 | 0 | — | 0.2 | 682 | N/A |
| Communist (NI) | 1 | 0 | 0 | 0 | 0 | — | 0.1 | 308 | N/A |
| Independent | 1 | 1 (Note: The sole independent member was elected unopposed.) | 0 | 0 | 0 | 1.9 | 0.0 | 0 | -0.4 |

All parties shown. The only independent candidate was elected unopposed. Electorate: 907,667 (563,252 in contested seats); Turnout: 57.6% (324,589).

=== Votes summary ===
Popular vote
| Ulster Unionist | 59.12% |
| Labour | 20.43% |
| Nationalist | 8.24% |
| National Democratic | 4.68% |
| Ulster Liberal | 3.89% |
| Independent Labour | 1.35% |
| Republican Labour | 1.02% |
| New Ireland Movement | 0.96% |
| Independent Republican | 0.21% |
| Communist | 0.09% |

=== Seats summary ===
Parliamentary seats
| Ulster Unionist | 69.23% |
| Nationalist | 17.31% |
| Labour | 3.85% |
| Republican Labour | 3.85% |
| National Democratic | 1.92% |
| Independent | 1.92% |

== See also ==
- List of members of the 11th House of Commons of Northern Ireland
