= Republican Labour Party =

Northern Irish centre-left republican party active 1964–1973

- Leader: Gerry Fitt (1964–1970); Paddy Kennedy (1970–1973)
- Founded: 1964
- Dissolved: 1973
- Preceded by: Socialist Republican Party
- Ideology: Socialism; Irish republicanism Anti-Common Market
- Political position: Centre-left

The Republican Labour Party (RLP) was a political party in Northern Ireland. It was founded in 1964, with two MPs at Stormont, Harry Diamond and Gerry Fitt. They had previously been the sole Northern Ireland representatives of the Socialist Republican Party and the Irish Labour Party respectively, so a common joke was that "two one-man parties had become one two-man party". Fitt won the West Belfast seat in the UK general election of 1966, and held it in the 1970 election.

In August 1970, Fitt founded the Social Democratic and Labour Party, and he and Senator Paddy Wilson were expelled from the RLP by a vote of 52 to 1. Paddy Kennedy was elected as the new party leader. He formally withdrew from Parliament in 1971, and adopted a more strongly Irish republican stance, agreeing to attend a conference organised by William Whitelaw only if he could bring Irish Republican Army members as part of his delegation.

The party was wiped out in both the 1973 elections to the Northern Ireland Assembly and the 1973 local elections and as a result was disbanded.

== Electoral Results ==
=== Northern Ireland General Elections ===
Election	Votes	%	±	Seats	±
1965(NI Parliament)	3,326	1.02%	New	2 / 52	▲1
1969(NI Parliament)	13,115	2.4%	▲1.18	2 / 52	Steady
1973 (NI Assembly)	1,750	0.2%	New	0 / 78	New

=== Westminster Elections ===
Election	Votes	%	±	Seats (for Northern Ireland)	±
1964	14,678	2.3%	New	0 / 12	New
1966	26,292	4.4%	▲1.1	1 / 12	▲1
1970	30,649	3.9%	▼0.5	1 / 12	Steady

=== Local Elections ===
Election	Votes	%	±	Seats	±
1973	2,594	0.4%	-	0 / 462	▼
