= 1945 Northern Ireland general election =

- 14 June 1945

All 52 seats to the House of Commons of Northern Ireland 27 seats were needed for a majority
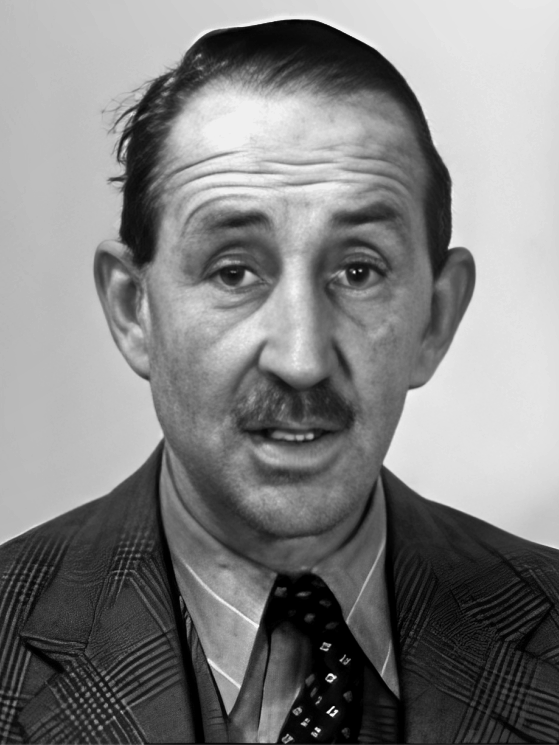

	First party	Second party
Leader	Basil Brooke	T. J. Campbell
Party	UUP	Nationalist
Leader since	1 May 1943	18 January 1934
Leader's seat	Lisnaskea	Belfast Central
Last election	39 seats, 56.8%	8 seats, 4.9%
Seats won	33 (Note: Includes 13 members elected unopposed.)	10 (Note: Includes 6 members elected unopposed.)
Seat change	▼6	▲2
Popular vote	180,342 (Note: Voting only took place in 32 of 52 seats. The other 20 MPs were unopposed.)	32,546
Percentage	50.4%	9.1%
Swing	▼6.4%	▲4.2%
	Third party	Fourth party
Leader	Paddy Agnew	Harry Midgley
Party	NI Labour	Commonwealth Labour
Leader since	1938	1942
Leader's seat	South Armagh (defeated)	Belfast Willowfield
Last election	1 seat, 5.7%	Did not stand
Seats won	2	1
Seat change	▲1	▲1
Popular vote	66,053	28,079
Percentage	18.5%	7.8%
Swing	▲12.8%	New party
- Percentage of seats gained by each of the party
Prime Minister before election
Basil Brooke
UUP
Prime Minister after election
Basil Brooke
UUP

The 1945 Northern Ireland general election was held on 14 June 1945. The election saw significant losses for the Ulster Unionist Party, though they retained their majority.

20 MPs were elected unopposed (38%), the vast majority of whom were Ulster Unionists. Four MPs affiliated with the labour movement were elected, a new record that would not be surpassed until 1958.

== Results ==
↓
33	10	2	2	5
UUP	Nationalist	L	IU	Oth

1945 Northern Ireland general election
Party	Candidates						Votes		
Party	Stood	Elected	Gained	Unseated	Net	% of total	%	No.	Net %
UUP	41	33	0	6	-6	63.5	50.4	180,342	-6.4
NI Labour	15	2	2	1	+1	3.8	18.5	66,053	+12.8
Nationalist	11	10	2	0	+2	19.2	9.1	32,546	+4.2
Commonwealth Labour	6	1	1	0	+1	1.9	7.8	28,079	N/A
Ind. Unionist	5	2 (Note: Includes 1 member elected unopposed.)	1	1	0	3.8	5.0	17,906	-1.8
Communist (NI)	3	0	0	0	0		3.5	12,456	N/A
Independent Labour	2	1	0	0	0	1.9	2.8	9,872	+1.1
Socialist Republican	2	1	1	0	+1	1.9	1.5	5,497	N/A
Federation of Labour	1	0	0	0	0		1.1	3,912	N/A
Independent	2	2	2	0	+2	3.8	0.3	1,219	-1.9

Electorate: 845,964 (509,098 in contested seats); Turnout: 70.3% (357,882).

=== Votes summary ===
Popular vote
Ulster Unionist	50.39%
Labour	18.46%
Nationalist Party	9.09%
Commonwealth Labour	7.85%
Independent Unionist	5.00%
Communist	3.48%
Independent Labour	2.76%
Socialist Republican	1.54%
Federation of Labour	1.09%
Independent	0.34%

=== Seats summary ===
Parliamentary seats
Ulster Unionist	63.46%
Nationalist Party	19.23%
Independent Unionist	3.85%
Labour	3.85%
Independent Labour	1.92%
Commonwealth Labour	1.92%
Socialist Republican	1.92%
Independent	3.85%

=== Contested seats ===
Only 32 of the 52 seats (62%) were actually contested.

1945 Northern Ireland general election (contested seats)
Party	Popular vote		Candidates		
Party	Votes	%	Stood	Elected	%
Ulster Unionist	180,342	50.4	28	20	62.5
Labour	66,053	18.5	15	2	6.3
Nationalist	32,546	9.1	5	4	12.5
Commonwealth Labour	28,079	7.8	6	1	3.1
Ind. Unionist	17,906	5.0	4	1	3.1
Communist	12,456	3.5	3	0	—
Ind. Labour	9,872	2.8	2	1	3.1
Socialist Republican	5,497	1.5	2	1	—
Federation of Labour	3,912	1.1	1	0	—
Independent	1,219	0.3	2	2	6.3
Total	357,882	70.3	68	32	—

=== Uncontested seats ===
In 20 of the 52 seats (38%), only one candidate stood and they were elected unopposed without any votes cast. The vast majority of the MPs elected without a contest were Ulster Unionists.

1945 Northern Ireland general election (uncontested seats)
Party	Popular vote		Candidates		
Party	Votes	%	Stood	Elected	%
Ulster Unionist	Unopposed		13	13	65.0
Nationalist	Unopposed		6	6	30.0
Ind. Unionist	Unopposed		1	1	5.0
Total			20	20	100

== See also ==
- 1945 United Kingdom general election
