= 1949 Northern Ireland general election =

← 1945	19 February 1949	1953 →

All 52 seats to the House of Commons of Northern Ireland 27 seats were needed for a majority
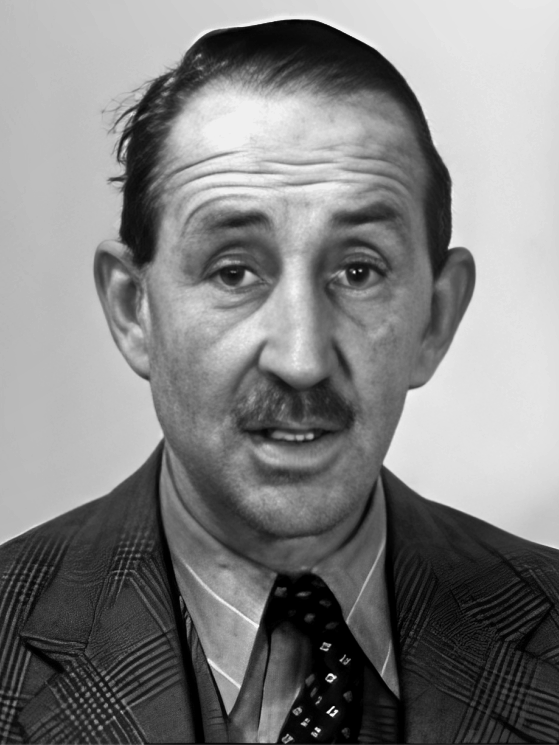
	First party	Second party
		Nat
Leader	Basil Brooke	James McSparran
Party	UUP	Nationalist
Leader since	1 May 1943	15 November 1945
Leader's seat	Lisnaskea	Mourne
Last election	33 seats, 50.4%	9 seats, 9.1%
Seats won	37 (Note: Includes 14 members elected unopposed.)	9 (Note: Includes 2 members elected unopposed.)
Seat change	▲4	▼1
Popular vote	237,411 (Note: Voting only took place in 32 of 52 seats. The other 20 MPs were unopposed.)	101,445
Percentage	62.7%	26.8%
Swing	▲12.3%	▲17.6%
- Election results by constituency
Prime Minister before election
Basil Brooke
UUP
Prime Minister after election
Basil Brooke
UUP

The 1949 Northern Ireland general election was held on 19 February 1949. The election became known as the Chapel-gate election because collections were held at churches in the Republic of Ireland to support the Nationalist Party campaign.

The election was held just after the Republic of Ireland's declaration of a republic. The Unionists were able to use their majority in the Parliament of Northern Ireland to schedule the election at a time when many Protestants felt uneasy about events taking place south of the border, and as a result might be more likely to vote Unionist than for Labour candidates. This appears to have been borne out in the collapse of the Labour vote; the party lost both of its 2 seats in the Commons, and would not return to the Parliament until 1958.

20 MPs were elected unopposed, most of them Ulster Unionists.

== Results ==
↓
37	9	2	4
UUP	Nationalist	IU	Oth

1949 Northern Ireland general election
Party	Candidates						Votes		
Party	Stood	Elected	Gained	Unseated	Net	% of total	%	No.	Net %
UUP	46	37	4	0	+4	71.2	62.7	237,411	+12.3
Nationalist	17	9	0	1	-1	17.3	26.8	101,445	+17.6
NI Labour	9	0	0	2	-2	—	7.1	26,831	-11.4
Independent Labour	4	1 (Note: The only Independent Labour member was elected unopposed.)	1	1	0	1.9	2.1	7,970	-0.7
Ind. Unionist	3	2 (Note: Both Independent Unionists were elected unopposed.)	0	0	0	3.8	0.6	2,150	-4.4
Independent	2	2	0	0	0	3.8	0.5	2,028	+0.2
Communist (NI)	1	0	0	0	0	—	0.2	623	-2.6
Socialist Republican	1	1 (Note: The only Socialist Republican member was elected unopposed.)	0	0	0	1.9	0.0	0	-1.5

All parties shown. Electorate 846,719 (477,354 in contested seats); Turnout 79.3% (378,458).

=== Votes summary ===
Popular vote
Ulster Unionist	62.73%
Nationalist Party	26.80%
Labour	7.10%
Independent Labour	2.11%
Independent Unionist	0.57%
Communist	0.16%
Independent	0.54%

=== Seats summary ===
Parliamentary seats
Ulster Unionist	71.15%
Nationalist Party	17.31%
Independent Unionist	3.85%
Independent Labour	1.92%
Socialist Republican	1.92%
Independent	3.85%

=== Contested seats ===
Only 32 of the 52 seats (62%) were actually contested.

1949 Northern Ireland general election (contested seats)
Party	Popular vote		Candidates		
Party	Votes	%	Stood	Elected	%
Ulster Unionist	237,411	62.7	32	23	71.9
Nationalist	101,445	26.8	15	7	21.9
Labour	26,831	7.1	9	0	—
Ind. Labour	7,970	2.1	3	0	—
Ind. Unionist	2,150	0.6	1	0	—
Independent	2,028	0.5	2	2	6.3
Communist	623	0.2	1	0	—
Total	378,458	79.3	63	32	—

=== Uncontested seats ===
In 20 of the 52 seats (38%), only one candidate stood and they were elected unopposed without any votes cast. The vast majority of the MPs elected without a contest were Ulster Unionists.

1949 Northern Ireland general election (uncontested seats)
Party	Popular vote		Candidates		
Party	Votes	%	Stood	Elected	%
Ulster Unionist	Unopposed		14	14	70.0
Nationalist	Unopposed		2	2	10.0
Ind. Unionist	Unopposed		2	2	10.0
Ind. Labour	Unopposed		1	1	5.0
Socialist Republican	Unopposed		1	1	5.0
Total			20	20	100

== See also ==
- MPs elected in the Northern Ireland general election, 1949
