= O'Neill ministry =

The Parliament of Northern Ireland was the home rule legislature created under the Government of Ireland Act 1920, which existed from 7 June 1921 to 30 March 1972, when it was suspended. It was subsequently abolished under the Northern Ireland Constitution Act 1973.

The third Government or Executive Committee of the Privy Council of Northern Ireland was led by Terence O'Neill who was Prime Minister from 25 March 1963 to 1 May 1969.

== Cabinet ==
Office	Member	Term
Prime Minister	Terence O'Neill	from 25 March 1963
Minister of Finance for Northern Ireland	Jack Andrews	from 25 March 1963
Minister of Finance for Northern Ireland	Ivan Neill	from 22 July 1964
Minister of Finance for Northern Ireland	Herbert Kirk	from 2 April 1965
Minister of Home Affairs for Northern Ireland	William Craig	from 29 April 1963
Minister of Home Affairs for Northern Ireland	Brian McConnell	from 22 July 1964
Minister of Home Affairs for Northern Ireland	William Craig	from 7 October 1966
Minister of Home Affairs for Northern Ireland	William Long	from 11 December 1968
Minister of Home Affairs for Northern Ireland	Robert Porter	from 12 March 1969
Minister of Education for Northern Ireland	Ivan Neill	from 12 March 1962
Minister of Education for Northern Ireland	Herbert Kirk	from 22 July 1964
Minister of Education for Northern Ireland	William Fitzsimmons	from 2 April 1965
Minister of Education for Northern Ireland	William Long	from 7 October 1966
Minister of Education for Northern Ireland	William Fitzsimmons	from 19 December 1968
Minister of Education for Northern Ireland	Phelim O'Neill	from 12 March 1969
Minister of Agriculture for Northern Ireland	Harry West	from 17 October 1960
Minister of Agriculture for Northern Ireland	vacant	from 26 April 1967
Minister of Agriculture for Northern Ireland	James Chichester-Clark	from 5 May 1967
Minister of Agriculture for Northern Ireland	vacant	from 23 April 1969
Minister of Labour for Northern Ireland	Herbert Kirk	from 12 March 1962
Minister of Labour for Northern Ireland	William Morgan	from 22 July 1964
Minister of Labour for Northern Ireland	Position abolished	1 January 1965
Minister of Commerce for Northern Ireland	Brian Faulkner	from 25 March 1963
Minister of Commerce for Northern Ireland	Roy Bradford	from 24 January 1969
Minister of Health for Northern Ireland	William Morgan	from 17 February 1961
Minister of Health for Northern Ireland	William Craig	from 22 July 1964
Minister of Health for Northern Ireland	William Morgan	from 1 January 1965
Minister of Health for Northern Ireland	Robert Porter	from 27 January 1969
Minister of Health for Northern Ireland	Robert Porter	from 12 March 1969
Minister of Development for Northern Ireland	William Craig	Office created 1 January 1965
Minister of Development for Northern Ireland	William Fitzsimmons	from 7 October 1966
Minister of Development for Northern Ireland	Ivan Neill	from 19 December 1968
Minister of Development for Northern Ireland	vacant	from 3 March 1969
Minister of Development for Northern Ireland	William Long	from 12 March 1969
