= List of Privy Counsellors of Northern Ireland =

This is a list of members of the Privy Council of Northern Ireland. This Privy Council was created in 1922, and ceased to meet in 1972, since when no appointments have been made although it has never been formally abolished. Two members are still living as of August 2026.

== Members ==
Appointed	Name	Born	Died	Reference
12 December 1922	Sir James Craig, Bt	1871	1940	
12 December 1922	The Marquess of Londonderry	1878	1949	
12 December 1922	The Marquess of Dufferin and Ava	1875	1930	
12 December 1922	Hugh Pollock	1852	1937	
12 December 1922	Sir Dawson Bates	1876	1949	
12 December 1922	Edward Archdale	1853	1943	
12 December 1922	J. M. Andrews	1871	1956	
12 December 1922	Sir Denis Henry, Bt.	1864	1925	
12 December 1922	William Moore	1864	1944	
12 December 1922	Hugh O'Neill	1883	1982	
12 December 1922	Thomas Watters Brown	1879	1944	
12 December 1922	Richard Best	1872	1939	
20 April 1923	Thomas Shillington	1835	1925	
20 April 1923	Robert Glendinning	1844	1928	
20 April 1923	Samuel Cunningham	1862	1946	
20 April 1923	Robert Wallace	1860	1929	
20 April 1923	Robert David Percival-Maxwell	1870	1932	
20 April 1923	William Henry Holmes Lyons	1843	1924	
27 September 1923	Charles Curtis Craig	1869	1960	
27 November 1923	The Earl of Ranfurly	1856	1933	
27 November 1923	Sir James Johnston	1849	1924	
27 November 1923	Herbert Dixon	1880	1950	
27 November 1923	Thomas Moles	1871	1937	
1 January 1924	James Andrews	1877	1951	
1 January 1924	Hugh Montgomery	1844	1924	
14 April 1925	Milne Barbour	1868	1951	
8 January 1926	The Viscount Charlemont	1880	1949	
8 January 1926	Anthony Babington	1877	1972	
1 June 1927	Sir William George Turner	1872	1937	
1 June 1927	Robert Anderson	1871	1948	
1 January 1930	Harry Mulholland	1888	1971	
25 August 1930	Sir Thomas Dixon, Bt	1868	1950	
1 January 1931	The Viscount Bangor	1868	1950	
1 January 1932	Henry Armstrong	1844	1943	
15 December 1933	Sir Basil Brooke, Bt	1888	1973	
23 August 1934	Maurice McCausland	1872	1938	
1 January 1936	The Earl of Kilmorey	1883	1961	
21 April 1937	David Graham Shillington	1872	1944	
1 December 1937	John Hanna Robb	1884	1957	
15 September 1938	John Fawcett Gordon	1879	1965	
26 May 1939	Edward Sullivan Murphy	1880	1945	
25 June 1940	John MacDermott	1896	1979	
29 June 1940	Sir Joseph Davison	1868	1948	
11 June 1941	Sir Crawford McCullagh, Bt	1868	1948	
10 November 1941	William Grant	1877	1949	
1 January 1942	James Graham Leslie	1868	1949	
6 May 1943	Maynard Sinclair	1896	1953	
6 May 1943	William Lowry	1884	1949	
6 May 1943	Robert Corkey	1881	1966	
6 May 1943	Robert Moore	1886	1960	
6 May 1943	Harry Midgley	1893	1957	
21 March 1944	Samuel Hall-Thompson	1885	1954	
21 March 1944	Roland Nugent	1886	1962	
3 November 1944	Edmond Warnock	1887	1972	
3 August 1945	Brian Maginess	1901	1967	
1 January 1946	The Duke of Abercorn	1869	1953	
1 January 1946	Sir Norman Stronge, Bt	1894	1981	
12 June 1947	Samuel Clarke Porter	1875	1956	
12 June 1947	Arthur Black	1888	1968	
12 April 1949	William McCleery	1887	1957	
26 August 1949	Dame Dehra Parker	1882	1963	
12 January 1950	Ivan Neill	1906	2001	
23 January 1951	Alexander Gordon	1882	1967	
5 November 1953	The Lord Glentoran	1912	1995	
5 November 1953	George Hanna	1906	1964	
20 April 1956	Terence O'Neill	1914	1990	
23 October 1956	Walter Topping	1908	1980	
4 February 1957	Lancelot Curran	1899	1984	
26 March 1957	Jack Andrews	1903	1986	
17 May 1957	William May	1909	1962	
15 December 1959	Brian Faulkner	1922	1977	
17 October 1960	Harry West	1917	2004	
17 February 1961	William James Morgan	1914	1999	
12 March 1962	Herbert Kirk	1912	2006	
29 April 1963	William Craig	1924	2011	
22 July 1964	Brian McConnell	1922	2000	
1 January 1965	Herbert McVeigh	1908	1977	
1 January 1965	Edward Warburton Jones	1912	1993	
5 April 1965	William Fitzsimmons	1909	1992	
7 October 1966	William Long	1922	2008	
7 October 1966	James Chichester-Clark	1923	2002	
1 January 1969	Basil Kelly	1920	2008	
24 January 1969	Roy Bradford	1920	1998	
27 January 1969	Robert Porter	1923	2014	
12 March 1969	Phelim O'Neill	1909	1994	
12 March 1969	Nat Minford	1912	1975	
3 May 1969	John Dobson	1929	2009	
25 September 1969	Robert Simpson	1923	1997	
26 August 1970	John Taylor	1937	Living	
25 March 1971	Robin Bailie	1937	Living	
25 March 1971	David Bleakley	1925	2017	
25 March 1971	John Brooke	1922	1987	
30 July 1971	Robert Lowry	1919	1999	
26 October 1971	Basil McIvor	1928	2004	
27 October 1971	G. B. Newe	1907	1982	

== See also ==
- List of Northern Ireland members of the Privy Council of the United Kingdom
