= List of members of the 12th House of Commons of Northern Ireland =

This is a list of members of Parliament elected in the 1969 Northern Ireland general election.

All members of the Northern Ireland House of Commons elected at the 1969 Northern Ireland general election are listed.

== Members ==
Name	Constituency	Party
Albert Anderson	City of Londonderry	UUP
Robert Babington	North Down	UUP
Robin Bailie	Newtownabbey	UUP
Desmond Boal	Belfast Shankill	UUP
Roy Bradford	Belfast Victoria	UUP
John Brooke	Lisnaskea	UUP
Joseph Burns	North Londonderry	UUP
Thomas Caldwell	Belfast Willowfield	Ind. Unionist
Joshua Cardwell	Belfast Pottinger	UUP
John Carron	South Fermanagh	Nationalist
James Chichester-Clark	South Londonderry	UUP
Ivan Cooper	Mid Londonderry	Independent
William Craig	Larne	UUP
Austin Currie	East Tyrone	Nationalist
Paddy Devlin	Belfast Falls	NI Labour
Anne Dickson	Carrick	UUP
John Dobson	West Down	UUP
Brian Faulkner	East Down	UUP
Richard Ferguson	South Antrim	UUP
Gerry Fitt	Belfast Dock	Republican Labour
William Fitzsimmons	Belfast Duncairn	UUP
William Samuel Fyffe	North Tyrone	UUP
Thomas Gormley	Mid Tyrone	Nationalist
Lloyd Hall-Thompson	Belfast Clifton	Ind. Unionist
John Hume	Foyle	Independent
Basil Kelly	Mid Down	UUP
Paddy Kennedy	Belfast Central	Republican Labour
William Kennedy	Belfast Cromac	UUP
Michael Keogh	South Down	Nationalist
Herbert Victor Kirk	Belfast Windsor	UUP
Norman Laird	Belfast St Anne's	UUP
William Long	Ards	UUP
Samuel Magowan	Iveagh	UUP
Robert Dodd McConnell	Bangor	Ind. Unionist
Basil McIvor	Larkfield	UUP
John McQuade	Belfast Woodvale	UUP
Nat Minford	Antrim	UUP
Robert James Mitchell	North Armagh	UUP
Ivan Neill	Belfast Ballynafeigh	UUP
Roderick O'Connor	West Tyrone	Nationalist
Patrick O'Hanlon	South Armagh	Independent
Phelim O'Neill	North Antrim	UUP
Terence O'Neill	Bannside	UUP
James O'Reilly	Mourne	Nationalist
Robert Porter	Lagan Valley	UUP
Walter Scott	Belfast Bloomfield	UUP
Robert Simpson	Mid Antrim	UUP
Vivian Simpson	Belfast Oldpark	NI Labour
James Stronge	Mid Armagh	UUP
John Taylor	South Tyrone	UUP
Harry West	Enniskillen	UUP
Herbert Whitten	Central Armagh	UUP

== Changes ==
- November 1969: Thomas Gormley resigned from the Nationalist Party to sit as an Independent Nationalist.
- 19 March 1970: Desmond Boal, William Craig, Norman Laird, John McQuade and Harry West expelled from the Ulster Unionist parliamentary party.
- 16 April 1970: Ian Paisley and William Beattie of the Protestant Unionist Party were elected in Bannside and South Antrim to replace Terence O'Neill and Richard Ferguson respectively.
- 21 August 1970: Ivan Cooper, Austin Currie, Paddy Devlin, Gerry Fitt, John Hume and Paddy O'Hanlon found the Social Democratic and Labour Party.
- September 1970: Lloyd Hall-Thompson joins the Ulster Unionist Party
- 12 November 1970: John Dunn Laird of the Ulster Unionist Party was elected in Belfast St Anne's to replace his father, Norman Laird.
- March 1971: Harry West re-admitted to the Ulster Unionist parliamentary party; Anne Dickson resigns from the Ulster Unionist Party.
- 30 October 1971: William Beattie, Desmond Boal, Ian Paisley and John McQuade founded the Democratic Unionist Party.
- 27 January 1972: John Laird and Robert James Mitchell expelled from the Ulster Unionist Party.
- 9 February 1972: William Craig founded the Ulster Vanguard movement.
- 1972: Thomas Columba Gormley, Robert Dodd McConnell, Phelim O'Neill and Robert Wilson Porter joined the Alliance Party of Northern Ireland.
- 10 October 1972: Robert Simpson resigned from the Ulster Unionist Party.
