= Executive of the 1974 Northern Ireland Assembly =

Devolved government of Northern Ireland from 1 January to 28 May 1974

- 1974 Executive of Northern Ireland
- Date formed: 1 January 1974
- Date dissolved: 28 May 1974

People and organisations
- Head of state: Elizabeth II
- Head of government: Brian Faulkner
- Deputy head of government: Gerry Fitt
- No. of ministers: 9
- Member party: UUP (pro-assembly); SDLP; Alliance
- Status in legislature: Coalition

History
- Election: 1973 assembly election
- Legislature term: 1973 Assembly
- Predecessor: Faulkner ministry
- Successor: Direct rule (1974–98); 1st Executive of Northern Ireland

A power-sharing Northern Ireland Executive was formed following the Northern Ireland Assembly elections of 1973. The executive served as the devolved government of Northern Ireland from 1 January 1974 until its collapse on 28 May 1974.

== History ==
Elections to a Northern Ireland Assembly were held on 28 June 1973. On 21 November, the Sunningdale Agreement was reached on a voluntary coalition of pro-agreement parties, and the Executive took office on 1 January 1974. Prominent members of the executive included former Ulster Unionist Party Prime Minister Brian Faulkner as chief executive, then Social Democratic and Labour Party (SDLP) leader Gerry Fitt as deputy chief executive, future Nobel Laureate and SDLP leader John Hume as minister for commerce and then leader of the Alliance Party of Northern Ireland Oliver Napier as legal minister and head of the Office of Law Reform.

The UUP was deeply divided; its Standing Committee voted to participate in the executive by a margin of only 132 to 105. Since the partition of Ireland, unionists had been opposed to sharing power with the Irish nationalist minority and the end of majoritarianism caused great strife in the UUP. Other contentious issues were internment, policing and the question of the planned Council of Ireland.

After opposition from within the UUP and the Ulster Workers' Council strike, the executive and Assembly collapsed on 28 May 1974 when Faulkner resigned as chief executive.

== Chief Executive ==
In January 1974 Brian Faulkner became chief executive in the power-sharing executive with the SDLP and the non-sectarian Alliance Party, a political alliance cemented at the Sunningdale Conference that year. After opposition from within the UUP and the Ulster Workers Council Strike, the executive and assembly collapsed on 28 May 1974 when Faulkner resigned as chief executive. Brian Faulkner would later then form his own political party known as the Unionist Party of Northern Ireland. They contested the 1975 Constitutional Convention Elections in which they got only 5 seats and no new chief executive was elected to replace Brian Faulkner.

No.	Name (Birth–Death) Constituency	Portrait	Term of office		Elected (Assembly)	Executive	Party	Last office(s) held before election
1.	Brian Faulkner (1921–1977); MLA for South Down		1 January 1974	28 May 1974	1973 (Assembly)	1974; Executive	Ulster Unionist Party	Prime Minister of Northern Ireland (1971–1972); Minister of Home Affairs (1971–1972)

== 1974 Executive of Northern Ireland ==
Office	Name	Term	Party
Chief Executive	Brian Faulkner	1974	UUP
Deputy Chief Executive	Gerry Fitt	1974	SDLP
Minister of Agriculture	Leslie Morrell	1974	UUP
Minister of Commerce	John Hume	1974	SDLP
Minister of Education	Basil McIvor	1974	UUP
Minister of the Environment	Roy Bradford	1974	UUP
Minister of Finance	Herbert Kirk	1974	UUP
Minister of Health and Social Services	Paddy Devlin	1974	SDLP
Minister of Housing, Local Government and Planning	Austin Currie	1974	SDLP
Minister of Information	John Baxter	1974	UUP
Legal Minister and Head of the Office of Law Reform	Oliver Napier	1974	Alliance

== See also ==
- Northern Ireland Assembly (1973)
- Members of the Northern Ireland Assembly elected in 1973
- 1973 Northern Ireland Assembly election
- History of Northern Ireland
