= Minister of Education (Northern Ireland) =

The Minister of Education was a member of the Executive Committee of the Privy Council of Northern Ireland (Cabinet) in the Parliament of Northern Ireland which governed Northern Ireland from 1921 to 1972.

#	Name	Took office	Prime Minister	Party
1.	Charles Vane-Tempest-Stewart, 7th Marquess of Londonderry	7 June 1921	Craig	UUP
2.	James Caulfeild, 8th Viscount Charlemont	8 January 1926	Craig	UUP
	Vacant	13 October 1937	Craig	N/A
3.	John Hanna Robb	1 December 1937	Craig, Andrews	UUP
4.	Robert Corkey	6 May 1943	Brookeborough	UUP
5.	Samuel Hall-Thompson	21 March 1944	Brookeborough	UUP
6.	Harry Midgley	12 January 1950	Brookeborough	UUP
7.	William May	17 May 1957	Brookeborough	UUP
8.	Ivan Neill	12 March 1962	Brookeborough, O'Neill	UUP
9.	Herbert Kirk	22 July 1964	O'Neill	UUP
10.	William Fitzsimmons	2 April 1965	O'Neill	UUP
11.	William Long	7 October 1966	O'Neill	UUP
12.	William Fitzsimmons	19 December 1968	O'Neill	UUP
13.	Phelim O'Neill	12 March 1969	O'Neill	UUP
14.	William Long	3 May 1969	Chichester-Clark, Faulkner	UUP

== Parliamentary Secretary to the Ministry of Education ==
- 1921 – 1925 Robert McKeown
- 1925 – 1937 John Hanna Robb
- 1937 – 1944 Dehra Parker
- 1944 – 1967 vacant
- 1967 – 1968 Roy Bradford

Office abolished 1968

== See also ==
- Department of Education (Northern Ireland), modern devolved department
