= William James Morgan =

Politician in Northern Ireland (1914–1999)

Convention Member for North Belfast
- In office 1975–1976

Assembly Member for North Belfast
- In office 1973-1974

Minister of Health and Social Services
- In office 1965–1969

Member of Parliament for Belfast Clifton
- In office 1959–1969

Minister of Labour and National Insurance
- In office 1964–1965

Minister of Health and Local Government
- In office 1961–1964

Member of Parliament for Belfast Oldpark
- In office 1949–1958

Personal details
- Born: 17 July 1914
- Died: 12 May 1999 (aged 84)
- Political party: Unionist

William James Morgan (PC (NI)) (17 July 1914 – 12 May 1999) was a Unionist politician in Northern Ireland.

== Biography ==
A businessman by profession, he owned James Morgan & Sons, a transport contractors' business. He was president of the Irish Temperance Alliance and chairman of Oldpark YMCA. He was elected to the House of Commons of Northern Ireland from the Belfast Oldpark seat in 1949, and represented the constituency until his defeat by Labour in 1958. He was then elected for Belfast Clifton in a 1959 by-election, and served that constituency until being defeated in 1969.

He served as Assistant Parliamentary Secretary to the Ministry of Finance and Assistant Whip from 1958 to 1961. This included five months while not holding a seat in Parliament, something which was permitted for a maximum of six months under the Government of Ireland Act 1920. He entered the Cabinet and Privy Council of Northern Ireland in 1961 as Minister of Health and Local Government and was appointed as Minister of Labour and National Insurance in 1964, and then Minister of Health and Social Services from 1965 to 1969, when he resigned. He was prevented by court order from referring to himself as the official Unionist candidate at the 1969 general election because of a violation of the rules at his selection meeting. He lost that election to the pro-O'Neill unofficial Unionist candidate, Lloyd Hall-Thompson. He served as a member of the Senate from 1969 until he resigned in 1970.

He contested South Antrim in the by-election of 1970, losing to the much smaller Protestant Unionist Party, but did manage to be elected a member of the Northern Ireland Assembly for Belfast North from 1973 to 1974 as a "pledged" Ulster Unionist (i.e. pro-Sunningdale), and then a member of the Northern Ireland Constitutional Convention – this time as part of the United Ulster Unionist Coalition, having parted company with Brian Faulkner and the pro-Sunningdale Unionists over the Council of Ireland in May 1974 – from 1975 to 1976. He died on 12 May 1999.

Parliament of Northern Ireland
Preceded by Robert Getgood	Member of Parliament for Belfast Oldpark; 1949–1958	Succeeded by Vivian Simpson
Preceded by Robin Kinahan	Member of Parliament for Belfast Clifton; 1959–1969	Succeeded by Lloyd Hall-Thompson
Northern Ireland Assembly (1973)
New assembly	Assembly Member for North Belfast; 1973–1974	Assembly abolished
Northern Ireland Constitutional Convention
New convention	Member for North Belfast; 1975–1976	Convention dissolved
Party political offices
Preceded by Harry West	Unionist Assistant Whip; 1958–1961	Succeeded by William Fitzsimmons
Political offices
Preceded by Harry West	Assistant Parliamentary Secretary to the Ministry of Finance; 1958–1961	Succeeded by William Fitzsimmons
Vacant	Parliamentary Secretary to the Ministry of Commerce and Production; 1959–1961	Vacant
Preceded by Jack Andrews	Minister of Health and Local Government; 1961–1964	Succeeded by William Craig
Preceded by Herbert Kirk	Minister of Labour and National Insurance; 1964–1965	Office abolihed
Preceded by William Craig	Minister of Health and Social Services; 1965–1969	Succeeded by Robert Porter
