= Lucy Faulkner =

Lucy Barbara Ethel Faulkner, Baroness Faulkner of Downpatrick, CBE (née Forsythe; 1 July 1925 – 20 January 2012) was a Northern Irish journalist, unionist and peace advocate. Faulkner was the wife of the sixth and last Prime Minister of Northern Ireland Brian Faulkner, who was in office from 1971 to 1972. She was also the first woman to hold a seat as a National Governor of the BBC from Northern Ireland from 1978 to 1985. As a BBC Governor, Faulkner oversaw the formation of the Northern Ireland Broadcasting Council and the launch of Radio Foyle. She further became the chairwoman of the BBC in 1981.

She attended Glenlola Collegiate School in Bangor before enrolling in Trinity College, Dublin, where she studied history. Forsythe worked as a journalist, joining the staff of for The Belfast Telegraph in 1947. In 1949, she left the newspaper and became the personal secretary to then Northern Irish Prime Minister, Sir Basil Brooke, at Stormont House.

Forsythe married her husband, Brian Faulkner, in 1951 (Faulkner was serving as the youngest MP in the history of the Parliament of Northern Ireland at the time). The couple had first met due to their shared interests in both hunting and politics. After their marriage, the Faulkners resided in Highlands, which is located near the village of Seaforde, County Down. The couple had three children: David, Claire and Michael.

Brian Faulkner, was created Lord Faulkner of Downpatrick and introduced to the House of Lords on 22 February 1977. However, he was killed in a hunting accident just days later on 3 March 1977, following a stag hunt. The horse slipped and he was thrown onto the road and died instantly. Lady Faulkner was at his side in minutes having been following the hunt by car.

In 1985, Lady Faulkner was appointed Commander of the Order of the British Empire (CBE). Two years later, in the aftermath of the Remembrance Day bombing by the IRA, Faulkner implored the Protestant Unionists to consider a power sharing agreement and "put the clock back" and further appealed to the Catholic Nationalists to cooperate with Northern Irish security forces.

Additionally, Lady Faulkner worked as a researcher and trustee for the Ulster Historical Foundation.

Lady Faulkner died at her home on 20 January 2012 at the age of 86.
