= Minister and Leader of the House of Commons =

The Minister and Leader of the House of Commons was a cabinet post in the Parliament of Northern Ireland which governed Northern Ireland from 1921 to 1972. The position was established in 1966. It was vacant for two short periods, in 1968 and 1969, and from March 1971 was combined with the post of Minister of State in the Ministry of Development.

#	Name	Took office	Prime Minister	Party	Ref.
1.	James Chichester-Clark	7 October 1966	O'Neill	UUP	
2.	Brian McConnell	27 September 1967	O'Neill	UUP	
	Vacant	14 August 1968	O'Neill	UUP	
3.	James Chichester-Clark	2 September 1968	O'Neill	UUP	
	Vacant	23 April 1969	O'Neill	UUP	
4.	John Dobson	3 May 1969	Chichester-Clark	UUP	
5.	Nat Minford	23 March 1971	Faulkner	UUP	

There were at least two prior Leaders of the House of Commons, who held the position alongside other ministerial posts:

- 1964: Ivan Neill
- 1965: Brian Faulkner
