= 1970 Bannside by-election =

The 1970 Bannside by-election of 16 April 1970 resulted in the first election won by Ian Paisley.

On 16 April 1970, in a by-election to the Northern Ireland Parliament, Paisley, the leader of the Protestant Unionist Party, won the Bannside seat formerly held by Prime Minister Terence O'Neill.

This followed a close showing by Paisley where he had come 1,500 votes behind O'Neil in the 1969 general election. The seat that had not been contested since 1949, and the close result as well as the subsequent by-election result was seen as a bellwether for opposition to O'Neill's reform programme.

The by-election was held on the same day as a by-election in South Antrim which also resulted in a win by the Protestant Unionist candidate over the incumbent Ulster Unionist Party, who in this case came from further behind.

This was seen as launching Paisley's political career. In the 1970 UK general election, Paisley won the North Antrim seat in the UK Parliament, of which Bannside formed a part. He would retain this seat until 2010, mostly as leader of the Democratic Unionist Party.

1970 Bannside by-election
Party	Candidate	Votes	%	±%
Protestant Unionist	Ian Paisley	7,981	43.68	+5.04
UUP	Bolton Minford	6,778	37.09	−10.18
NI Labour	Patrick McHugh	3,514	19.23	New
Majority		1,203	6.59	N/A
Turnout		22,954	79.61	+0.20
Protestant Unionist gain from UUP		Swing		
