= Ivan Neill =

British Army officer and Unionist politician

The Right Honourable Sir Ivan Neill KBE PC MP

Speaker of the House of Commons of Northern Ireland
- In office 1969–1972
- Monarch: Elizabeth II
- Prime Minister: James Chichester-Clark; Brian Faulkner
- Preceded by: Sir Norman Stronge
- Succeeded by: Parliament prorogued

Minister for Development
- In office 19 December 1968 – 3 March 1969
- Monarch: Elizabeth II
- Prime Minister: Terence O'Neill
- Preceded by: William Fitzsimmons
- Succeeded by: William Long

Leader of the House of Commons
- In office 1964–1965
- Monarch: Elizabeth II
- Prime Minister: Terence O'Neill
- Preceded by: Position created
- Succeeded by: Brian Faulkner

Minister of Finance
- In office 22 July 1964 – 2 April 1965
- Monarch: Elizabeth II
- Prime Minister: Terence O'Neill
- Preceded by: Jack Andrews
- Succeeded by: Herbert Kirk

Minister of Education
- In office 12 March 1962 – 22 July 1964
- Monarch: Elizabeth II
- Prime Minister: The 1st Viscount Brookeborough
- Preceded by: William May
- Succeeded by: Herbert Kirk

Minister of Labour
- In office 12 January 1950 – 12 March 1962
- Monarchs: George VI; Elizabeth II
- Prime Minister: Sir Basil Brooke
- Preceded by: Harry Midgley
- Succeeded by: Herbert Kirk

Member of Parliament for Ballynafeigh
- In office 1949–1972
- Preceded by: Frederick Thompson
- Succeeded by: Parliament prorogued
- Majority: 3,848

Personal details
- Born: 1 July 1906 Belfast, Ireland
- Died: 7 November 2001 (aged 95) Belfast, Northern Ireland
- Party: Ulster Unionist Party
- Spouse: Margaret
- Education: The Queen's University of Belfast
- Occupation: Politician
- Profession: Economist, Army officer

Military service
- Allegiance: United Kingdom
- Branch/service: British Army
- Rank: Major
- Unit: Royal Engineers

Sir Ivan Neill, KBE, PC (1 July 1906 — 7 November 2001), was a British Army officer and Unionist politician from Northern Ireland.

== Early life ==
Born in Belfast, Ireland, Neill studied at Ravenscroft National School and Shaftesbury Tutorial College before receiving a BSc in Economics from Queen's University, Belfast. He ran a firm of building contractors in east Belfast before joining the Royal Engineers as an officer in 1939. He served with the military until 1946, by which time he held the rank of major.

== Political activity ==
In 1946, Neill was elected to Belfast Corporation as an Ulster Unionist Party member, and two years later, he became an alderman, serving until 1950. At the 1949 Northern Ireland general election, he was elected for Belfast Ballynafeigh. In January 1950, he was made Minister of Labour, and was appointed to the Privy Council of Northern Ireland. In this post, he sometimes spoke against his Government's policy – for example, against the 1956 Rent Bill which permitted landlords to increase rents in order to improve properties, while in 1958 he was rebuked for making a critical speech on economic policy.

He held the post until 1962, when he became Minister of Education, then in 1964 he moved to become Minister of Finance and Leader of the House of Commons. He was stripped of the Leadership of the House the following spring, and resigned from the Government in April, feeling that he was being marginalised in favour of William Craig.

In 1964, Neill again took a seat as an alderman on Belfast Corporation, this time serving for six years. In December 1968, he returned to the Government as Minister of Development, then in March 1969, he was elected as the Speaker of the House of Commons.

The Official Irish Republican Army attempted to kidnap Neill from his house near Rostrevor, in October 1971. They were unsuccessful, but in December, his house was burnt down in an arson attack.

The Parliament was prorogued in 1972. In March 1973, the British Government published its plans to replace the Parliament with the Northern Ireland Assembly. Neill resigned as a Member of Parliament and as Speaker. He was not replaced, and was therefore the last Speaker of the Parliament of Northern Ireland. He received a knighthood and withdrew from politics. An Order in Council, the Mr. Speaker Neill's Retirement (Northern Ireland) Order 1973 (SI 1973/1321), granted him an annuity of £2,260 from 1 April 1973 for Neill's remaining life.

== Personal life ==
Neill was married to Margaret with whom he had no children.

In 1995, Neill wrote an autobiography, Church and State. In this, he called on unionists to put aside their differences.

He was a frequent visitor to his local Baptist Church.

Parliament of Northern Ireland
Preceded by Frederick Thompson	Member of Parliament for Belfast Ballynafeigh; 1949–1973	Parliament abolished
Political offices
Preceded by Harry Midgley	Minister of Labour and National Insurance; 1950–62	Succeeded by Herbert Kirk
Preceded by William May	Minister of Education; 1962–64	Succeeded by Herbert Kirk
Preceded by Jack Andrews	Minister of Finance; 1964–65	Succeeded by Herbert Kirk
Unknown	Leader of the House of Commons; 1964–65	Succeeded by Brian Faulkner
Preceded by William Fitzsimmons	Minister of Development; 1968–69	Succeeded by William Long
Preceded by Sir Norman Stronge	Speaker of the House of Commons of Northern Ireland; 1969–73	Position prorogued 1972; Parliament abolished 1973
