= Young Unionists =

Youth wing of the Ulster Unionist Party

- Chairman: Jay Basra
- Treasurer: Matthew Bell
- Founded: 1946 (UYUC); 2004 (YU)
- Preceded by: Ulster Young Unionist Council
- Headquarters: Belfast, Northern Ireland
- Ideology: British unionism Conservatism
- Mother party: Ulster Unionist Party
- European affiliation: EY Conservatives

The Young Unionists, formally known as the Ulster Young Unionist Council (UYUC), is the youth wing of the Ulster Unionist Party (UUP). It has, in its present incarnation, been in existence since 2004.

The Young Unionists host annual events including debates, conferences, social gatherings, and canvassing in support of UUP candidates.

== History ==
UYUC Crest

Attempts had been made in the 1920s to create a youth movement linked to the Conservative Party (the Junior Imperial and Constitutional League) without success. A second attempt was made before the outbreak of the Second World War, which also failed. The UYUC was formed by the Standing Committee of the Ulster Unionist Council in 1946 and became active in South & West Belfast, Fermanagh and Down. The body's first Chairman was future Prime Minister of Northern Ireland, Brian Faulkner.

In 1959, Brian Maginess, Q.C., and Sir Clarence Graham, Bt., addressed the Young Unionists advocating an increase in Roman Catholic membership of the UUP. This was regarded as controversial at the time.

The organisation produced many prominent figures in Northern Ireland politics throughout the 1960s and 1970s such as Bill Craig and John D. Taylor. Disagreements over government policy and the collapse of the Stormont Parliament led to its decline in the early 1970s. The body was later revived under the Chairmanship of David McNarry and remained active throughout the 1980s, producing figures such as Edgar Graham, Jeffrey Donaldson, Peter Weir and Arlene Foster. The latter three later joined the DUP.

== 1990s to present ==
The organisation's membership was strongly opposed to the Belfast Agreement in 1998, and many campaigned against it. At the 2004 AGM the officers voted to disband the group.

A new organisation was reconstituted later that year and has remained active. Branches were established at Queen's University, Belfast, the University of Ulster and at constituency level across Northern Ireland.

The youth wing has produced many senior party figures including The Lord Laird, The Lord Rogan, Jeffrey Donaldson MP MLA and David McNarry, all of whom are former Chairmen, as well as Lord Empey, who served as Vice Chairman.

== Current activities ==
In the 2014 local government elections, 11 Young Unionist members were elected as councillors, representing over 10% of the UUP's total councillors.

The Young Unionists continue to organise conferences, debates and social events, as well as participating in canvassing activities for UUP candidates.

== 2026 Officers ==
- Chairman: Mr. Jay Basra
- Hon. Secretary: Mr. Lewis McVitty
- Hon. Treasurer: Mr. Matthew Bell
- Vice-Chairman: Mr. Chris Mercer
- Membership and Universities Officer: Mr. Joshua Pearson

== University Branches ==
Queen's University Belfast (Queen's Young Unionists)

- Chair: Mr. Jay Basra
- Vice Chair: Miss Georgia Hussey
- Secretary: Mr. Charlie Ahrens
- Treasurer: Mr. Ethan Dodds
- Events Organiser: Mr. Chris Mercer

Ulster University Belfast (Ulster University Young Unionists)

- Chair: Mr. Matt Walker
- Vice-Chair: Mr Daniel Spratt
- Secretary: Mr. Dylan White
- Treasurer: Miss. Erin Larmour

== Honorary Membership ==
Up to 15 Honorary positions are available;

- Honorary President: Mr. Joshua Lowry
- Honorary Patron: Mr. Jon Burrows
- Honorary Vice- President: Mr. Alexander Redpath
- Honorary Vice- President: Miss. Kellie Cowan
- Honorary Vice- President: Mr. Nathan Redmond
- Honorary Vice- President: Mr. Philip Agnew
- Honorary Vice- President: Mr. George Carson
- Honorary Vice- President: Miss. Bethany Ferris
- Honorary Vice- President: Mrs. Sarah Trimble
- Honorary Vice- President: Mr. Nicholas Trimble
- Honorary Vice- President: Miss. Olivia Swan

== Chairpersons ==
=== First UYUC ===
- 1949: Brian Faulkner
- 1953–1960: Bill Craig
- 1961–1962: John Taylor
- 1963: Robert McCartney
- 1968: Dennis Rogan
- 1970: John Laird
- 1976–1978: Jeremy Burchill

=== Second UYUC (reconstituted late 1970s–2004) ===
- 1981: Edgar Graham
- 1982–1983: David McNarry
- 1985–1986: Jeffrey Donaldson
- 1987: Chris McGimpsey
- 1989–1990: Peter Weir
- 1991–1993: David R. Brewster
- 1995: Arlene Foster
- 1999: Peter King
- 2002 & 2003: Cllr. Peter Brown

=== Current Young Unionists ===
- 2004: Mr. Kenny Donaldson
- 2005: Cllr. Peter Bowles
- 2006 & 2007: Cllr. Mark Dunn
- 2008: Mr. Peter Munce (January 2008 – October 2008)
- 2008 & 2009: Mr. Michael Shilliday
- 2010 & 2011: Mr. Alasdair O'Hara
- 2012 & 2013: Mr. Frank Geddis
- 2014: Cllr. Alexander Redpath
- 2015: Ms. Cathy Corbett
- 2016 & 2017: Cllr. Alexander Redpath
- 2018 & 2019: Mr. Joshua Lowry
- 2020 & 2021: Cllr. Stuart Hughes
- 2022 & 2023: Mr. Ben Sharkey
- 2024 & 2025: Mr. Matthew Bell
- 2026: Mr. Jay Basra

== Sources ==
- J. F. Harbinson, The Ulster Unionist Party, 1882–1973 : its development and organisation (1973)
- Graham Walker, A history of the Ulster Unionist Party : protest, pragmatism and pessimism (2004)
- David Hume, The Ulster Unionist Party 1972–92 (A Political Movement in an Era of Conflict and Change) (1996)
