= Minister of Health and Local Government =

Northern Ireland Executive Committee member, 1922–1972

The Minister of Health and Local Government was a member of the Executive Committee of the Privy Council of Northern Ireland (Cabinet) in the Parliament of Northern Ireland which governed Northern Ireland from 1922 to 1972. The post was created in 1944 and was renamed Minister of Health and Social Services in 1965.

#	Name	Took office	Prime Minister	Party
1.	William Grant	1 June 1944	Brookeborough	UUP
2.	Dehra Parker	26 August 1949	Brookeborough	UUP
	Post vacant	13 March 1957	Brookeborough	
3.	Jack Andrews	26 March 1957	Brookeborough	UUP
4.	William James Morgan	17 February 1961	Brookeborough, O'Neill	UUP
5.	William Craig	22 July 1964	O'Neill	UUP
6.	William James Morgan	1 January 1965	O'Neill	UUP
7.	Robert Porter	27 January 1969	O'Neill	UUP
8.	William Fitzsimmons	12 March 1969	O'Neill, Chichester-Clark, Faulkner	UUP

== Parliamentary Secretary to the Ministry of Health and Local Government/Health and Social Services ==
- 1944 Sir Wilson Hungerford
- 1944 - 1948 vacant
- 1948 – 1953 Terence O'Neill
- 1953 – 1955 vacant
- 1955 – 1956 Terence O'Neill
- 1956 – 1963 vacant
- 1963 – 1964 Brian McConnell
- 1964 - 1965 William Fitzsimmons
- 1965 - 1971 vacant
- 1971 - 1972 Joseph Burns

1972 office abolished
