= Larne (Northern Ireland Parliament constituency) =

Constituency of the Northern Ireland Parliament (1929–1973)

Coordinates: 54.873°N 5.909°W

- Former County constituency for the Parliament of Northern Ireland
- Larne shown within Northern Ireland

Former constituency
- Created: 1929
- Abolished: 1973
- Election method: First past the post

Larne was a single-member county constituency of the Parliament of Northern Ireland.

== Boundaries and boundary changes ==
This was a division of County Antrim. Before 1929, it was part of the seven-member Antrim constituency. The constituency sent one MP to the House of Commons of Northern Ireland from 1929 until the Parliament was temporarily suspended in 1972, and then formally abolished in 1973.

In terms of the then local government areas the constituency in 1929 comprised parts of the rural districts of Antrim, Ballymena and Larne. The division also included the whole of the urban districts of Larne and Whitehead.

== Members of Parliament ==
Election	Member	Party
1929	George Hanna	Ulster Unionist
1937	Harold Claude Robinson	Ulster Unionist
1945	Walter William Buchanan Topping	Ulster Unionist
1960	William Craig	Ulster Unionist
1973	constituency abolished	

== Elections ==
The parliamentary representatives of the division were elected using the first past the post system.

General Election 22 May 1929: Antrim Larne
Party	Candidate	Votes	%	±%
UUP	George Hanna	6,854	64.89	
Local Option	James Pringle	3,709	35.11	
Majority		3,145	29.78	
Turnout		17,154	61.58	
UUP win (new seat)				

General Election 30 November 1933: Antrim Larne
Party	Candidate	Votes	%	±%
UUP	George Hanna	Unopposed	N/A	N/A
UUP hold		Swing	N/A	

- Appointment of Hanna as a County Court Judge

1937 Larne by-election
Party	Candidate	Votes	%	±%
UUP	Harold Claude Robinson	6,545	50.94	N/A
Ind. Unionist	Andrew Ferris	6,303	49.06	New
Majority		242	1.88	N/A
Turnout		18,320	70.13	N/A
UUP hold		Swing	N/A	

General Election 9 February 1938: Antrim Larne
Party	Candidate	Votes	%	±%
UUP	Harold Claude Robinson	Unopposed	N/A	N/A
UUP hold		Swing	N/A	

- Death of Robinson

1945 Larne by-election
Party	Candidate	Votes	%	±%
UUP	Walter Topping	6,299	75.46	N/A
NI Labour	Vivian Simpson	2,049	24.54	New
Majority		4,250	50.92	N/A
Turnout		18,889	44.20	N/A
UUP hold		Swing	N/A	

General Election 14 June 1945: Antrim Larne
Party	Candidate	Votes	%	±%
UUP	Walter Topping	8,983	75.30	N/A
NI Labour	Vivian Simpson	2,947	24.70	N/A
Majority		6,036	50.60	N/A
Turnout		19,424	61.42	N/A
UUP hold		Swing	N/A	

General Election 10 February 1949: Antrim Larne
Party	Candidate	Votes	%	±%
UUP	Walter Topping	Unopposed	N/A	N/A
UUP hold		Swing	N/A	

General Election 22 October 1953: Antrim Larne
Party	Candidate	Votes	%	±%
UUP	Walter Topping	Unopposed	N/A	N/A
UUP hold		Swing	N/A	

General Election 20 March 1958: Antrim Larne
Party	Candidate	Votes	%	±%
UUP	Walter Topping	Unopposed	N/A	N/A
UUP hold		Swing	N/A	

- Appointment of Topping as Recorder of Belfast

1960 Larne by-election
Party	Candidate	Votes	%	±%
UUP	William Craig	Unopposed	N/A	N/A
UUP hold		Swing	N/A	

General Election 31 May 1962: Antrim Larne
Party	Candidate	Votes	%	±%
UUP	William Craig	9,388	74.00	N/A
NI Labour	William Cecil Watton	3,298	26.00	New
Majority		6,090	48.00	N/A
Turnout		20,514	61.84	N/A
UUP hold		Swing	N/A	

General Election 25 November 1965: Antrim Larne
Party	Candidate	Votes	%	±%
UUP	William Craig	Unopposed	N/A	N/A
UUP hold		Swing	N/A	

General Election 24 February 1969: Antrim Larne
Party	Candidate	Votes	%	±%
UUP	William Craig	8,550	51.99	N/A
Ind. Unionist	Hugh Wilson	7,897	48.01	New
Majority		653	3.98	N/A
Turnout		20,728	79.35	N/A
UUP hold		Swing	N/A	

- Parliament prorogued 30 March 1972 and abolished 18 July 1973
