= Brian McConnell, Baron McConnell =

British politician

The Right Honourable The Lord McConnell PC

Member of the House of Lords
- Lord Temporal
- Life peerage 10 February 1995 – 25 October 2000

Personal details
- Born: 25 November 1922
- Died: 25 October 2000 (aged 77)

Robert William Brian McConnell, Baron McConnell (25 November 1922 – 25 October 2000) was an Ulster Unionist MP in the Northern Ireland House of Commons.

== Biography ==
The grandson of Sir Robert McConnell, 1st Baronet, he was schooled at Sedbergh School and at Queen's University, Belfast where he read law, subsequently being called to the Bar of Northern Ireland.

Starting off as a Junior Unionist, Brian McConnell attended the Conservative Conference in Brighton as an Ulster Unionist delegate in 1947, at which he made a warmly received address on one of the resolutions before the conference of over 3,500. He was first elected to Stormont at the 1953 Northern Ireland general election. In 1962 Lord Brookeborough appointed him Parliamentary Secretary to the Ministry of Finance (Government Chief Whip), and after holding a junior office at the relatively new Ministry of Health, he became Minister of Home Affairs in 1964 in the government of Terence O'Neill.

In 1966 however Ian Paisley led a protest to the General Assembly of the Presbyterian Church in Ireland for the installation of a new Moderator. At the protest the Governor of Northern Ireland, Lord Erskine was jostled on his way into the building, an incident which was attributed to the future ill health and ultimately the death of Lady Erskine. This was largely blamed on McConnell (who was in London at the time), and his period in elected office was effectively over.

Always a close associate of James Molyneaux, McConnell was raised to a life peerage as Baron McConnell, of Lisburn in the County of Antrim on 15 February 1995, reportedly owing to the then Prime Minister's reliance on Ulster Unionist votes to maintain his minority government. Molyneaux was criticized for the nomination of McConnell owing to his age when it was felt that a younger candidate could have been nominated.

An active member of the House of Lords, McConnell died on 25 October 2000.

== See also ==
- List of Northern Ireland Members of the House of Lords

Parliament of Northern Ireland
Preceded by Sir John Milne Barbour	Member of Parliament of Northern Ireland for South Antrim; 1951–1968	Succeeded by Richard Ferguson
Political offices
Preceded by Joseph William Morgan	Deputy Chairman of Ways and Means and Deputy Speaker of the Northern Ireland House of Commons; 1962–1963	Succeeded by Billy Boyd
Vacant	Parliamentary Secretary, Ministry of Health and Local Government; 1963–1964	Succeeded by William Kennedy Fitzsimmons
Preceded by William Craig	Minister of Home Affairs; 1964–1966	Succeeded by William Craig
New office	Minister of State, Ministry of Development; 1966–1967	Vacant
Preceded by James Chichester-Clark	Minister and Leader of the House of Commons; 1967–1968	Succeeded by James Chichester-Clark
