= Belfast Duncairn (Northern Ireland Parliament constituency) =

Constituency of the Parliament of Northern Ireland

Coordinates: 54.614°N 5.933°W

- Former Borough constituency for the Parliament of Northern Ireland
- Belfast shown within Northern Ireland

Former constituency
- Created: 1929
- Abolished: 1973
- Election method: First past the post

Belfast Duncairn was a constituency of the Parliament of Northern Ireland.

== Boundaries ==
Belfast Duncairn was a borough constituency comprising part of northern Belfast. It was created in 1929 when the House of Commons (Method of Voting and Redistribution of Seats) Act (Northern Ireland) 1929 introduced first-past-the-post elections throughout Northern Ireland.

Belfast Duncairn was created by the division of Belfast North into four new constituencies. It survived unchanged, returning one member of Parliament, until the Parliament of Northern Ireland was temporarily suspended in 1972, and then formally abolished in 1973.

== Politics ==
In common with other seats in North Belfast, the seat had little nationalist presence. It was always won by Unionist candidates, although labour movement and independent unionist candidates often contested it.

== Members of Parliament ==
Election	Member	Party
1929	William Grant	Ulster Unionist Party
1949(b)	George Hanna	Ulster Unionist Party
1956(b)	William Fitzsimmons	Ulster Unionist Party
1973	Constituency abolished	

== Election results ==
At the 1929 Northern Ireland general election, William Grant was elected unopposed.

General Election 1933: Belfast Duncairn
Party	Candidate	Votes	%	±%
UUP	William Grant	6,626	60.7	N/A
Ind. Unionist	Robert Hill	4,294	39.3	New
Majority		2,332	21.4	N/A
Turnout		10,920	70.2	N/A
UUP hold		Swing	N/A	

General Election 1938: Belfast Duncairn
Party	Candidate	Votes	%	±%
UUP	William Grant	7,151	54.1	−6.6
Ind. Unionist	Cecil Mitchell Lowe	3,956	29.9	N/A
Ind. Unionist Party	Robert Hill	2,111	16.0	−23.3
Majority		3,195	24.2	+2.8
Turnout		13,218	75.8	+5.6
UUP hold		Swing		

General Election 1945: Belfast Duncairn
Party	Candidate	Votes	%	±%
UUP	William Grant	7,034	54.5	+0.4
NI Labour	James Morrow	5,875	45.5	New
Majority		1,159	9.0	−15.2
Turnout		12,909	75.2	−0.6
UUP hold		Swing		

General Election 1949: Belfast Duncairn
Party	Candidate	Votes	%	±%
UUP	William Grant	10,979	83.1	+28.6
NI Labour	James Morrow	2,230	16.9	−28.6
Majority		8,749	66.2	+57.2
Turnout		13,209	77.6	+2.4
UUP hold		Swing		

Belfast Duncairn by-election, 1949
Party	Candidate	Votes	%	±%
UUP	George Hanna	7,590	73.9	−9.2
NI Labour	James Morrow	2,686	26.1	+9.2
Majority		4,904	47.8	−18.4
Turnout		10,276	54.7	−12.9
UUP hold		Swing		

At the 1953 Northern Ireland general election, George Hanna was elected unopposed.

Belfast Duncairn by-election, 1956
Party	Candidate	Votes	%	±%
UUP	William Fitzsimmons	4,779	68.3	N/A
NI Labour	John William McDowell	2,218	31.7	New
Majority		2,561	36.6	N/A
Turnout		6,997	34.4	N/A
UUP hold		Swing	N/A	

At the 1958 Northern Ireland general election, William Fitzsimmons was elected unopposed.

General Election 1962: Belfast Duncairn
Party	Candidate	Votes	%	±%
UUP	William Fitzsimmons	6,943	58.5	N/A
NI Labour	John William McDowell	4,850	40.9	New
World Socialist Party	Richard Montague	66	0.6	New
Majority		2,093	17.6	N/A
Turnout		11,859	60.6	N/A
UUP hold		Swing	N/A	

General Election 1965: Belfast Duncairn
Party	Candidate	Votes	%	±%
UUP	William Fitzsimmons	6,200	64.6	+6.1
NI Labour	John William McDowell	3,404	35.4	−5.5
Majority		2,796	29.2	+11.6
Turnout		9,604	49.3	−11.3
UUP hold		Swing		

General Election 1969: Belfast Duncairn
Party	Candidate	Votes	%	±%
UUP	William Fitzsimmons	7,435	63.2	−1.4
Ind. Unionist	Norman Porter	4,321	36.8	New
Majority		3,114	26.4	−2.8
Turnout		11,756	63.8	+14.5
UUP hold		Swing		
