= G. B. Newe =

Northern Irish politician (1907–1982)

Gerard Benedict Newe CBE (5 February 1907 – 25 October 1982) was a Northern Irish politician. A Roman Catholic and Unionist, he was the first Roman Catholic to be appointed a minister in the Government of Northern Ireland.

== Biography ==
Born at Cushendall, County Antrim, he was the son of gardener Patrick Newe and Catherine McCanny. He attended St. Malachy's College. A journalist, Newe edited The Ulster Farmer from 1931 to 1967. He helped to establish the Northern Ireland Council of Social Service and was Secretary of the group from 1948 to 1972. He was also a founder of the cross-community Protestant and Catholic Encounter Group. He was awarded an honorary MA by Queen's University Belfast in 1967.

=== Political career ===
Newe served as Minister of State in the Northern Ireland Government from 1971 to 1972. Although not a member of the parliament, he was appointed by Brian Faulkner as part of an attempt to liberalise the government of Northern Ireland. Newe was the only Catholic to serve as a minister in the original Stormont government. He was appointed to Her Majesty's Privy Council of Northern Ireland on 27 October 1971 at Government House, Hillsborough.

Long before his appointment, Newe had made known his view that the Catholic minority in Northern Ireland needed to fully engage with the Northern Ireland Government. In 1958 he condemned the futility of depending on the Republic of Ireland’s legal claim to the territory of Northern Ireland and encouraged Catholics to co-operate with the Northern government, it being in his own words, “the authority that controls life and welfare."

== Awards ==
- Named as OBE

Political offices
New office	Minister of State, Department of the Prime Minister of Northern Ireland; 1971–1972	Office abolished
