= Herbert McVeigh =

Northern Irish judge

Sir Herbert Andrew McVeigh (8 December 1908 – 3 October 1977), known as Bertie McVeigh, was a judge in Northern Ireland.

Born in Derry, McVeigh studied at Foyle College and Queen's University Belfast and became a barrister in 1931. He became a QC in 1948, then a High Court judge in 1956, and was appointed to the Court of Appeals in 1964. In 1965, he was appointed to the Privy Council of Northern Ireland.
