= George Hanna (Belfast MP) =

George Boyle Hanna (1906–1 March 1964) (PC (NI), was an Ulster Unionist member of the Parliament of Northern Ireland. He represented Belfast Duncairn from 1949 to 1956.

Born in Ballymena, County Antrim, he was the son of George Boyle Hanna. He was educated at Ballymena Academy, the Royal Belfast Academical Institution and Queen's University Belfast, he was called to the Bar in 1927 and became a King's Counsel in 1946. He was Commissioner for the Unionist Party in Armagh from 1934 to 1941.

He served in the Cabinet of Sir Basil Brooke as Minister of Home Affairs from 1953 to 1956 and then for five months in 1956 as Minister of Finance (de facto Deputy Prime Minister), before resigning from Government and from Parliament upon his appointment as a county court judge for County Down. He died on 1 March 1964.

== Sources ==
- Biographies of Members of the Northern Ireland House of Commons
- The Government of Northern Ireland

Parliament of Northern Ireland
Preceded by William Grant	Member of Parliament for Belfast Duncairn; 1949–1956	Succeeded by William Fitzsimmons
Political offices
Preceded by Brian Maginess	Minister of Home Affairs; 1956–56	Succeeded by Walter Topping
Preceded by Brian Maginess	Minister of Finance; 1956	Succeeded by Terence O'Neill
