= Herbert Kirk =

Member of the Parliament of Northern Ireland (1912–2006)

The Right Honourable Herbert Kirk

Minister of Finance
- In office January 1974 – May 1974
- Monarch: Elizabeth II
- Preceded by: Position created
- Succeeded by: Executive suspended

Minister of Finance
- In office 1965–1972
- Monarch: Elizabeth II
- Prime Minister: Terence O'Neill 1965–69 James Chichester-Clark 1969–71 Brian Faulkner 1971–72
- Preceded by: Ivan Neill
- Succeeded by: Position prorogued

Minister of Education
- In office 1964–1965
- Monarch: Elizabeth II
- Prime Minister: Terence O'Neill
- Preceded by: Ivan Neill
- Succeeded by: William Fitzsimmons

Minister of Labour
- In office 1962–1964
- Monarch: Elizabeth II
- Prime Minister: Basil Brooke 1962–63; Terence O'Neill 1963–64
- Preceded by: Ivan Neill
- Succeeded by: William James Morgan

Member of Parliament for Belfast Windsor
- In office 23 November 1956 – 30 March 1972
- Preceded by: Archibald Wilson
- Succeeded by: Parliament abolished
- Majority: Elected unopposed

Personal details
- Born: Herbert Kirk; 5 June 1912 Belfast, Ireland
- Died: 4 March 2006 (aged 93) Belfast, Northern Ireland
- Party: Ulster Unionist Party
- Education: Queen's University, Belfast
- Occupation: Politician
- Profession: Accountant

Herbert Victor Kirk PC (5 June 1912 – 4 March 2006) was an Ulster Unionist cabinet minister in Parliament of Northern Ireland.

== Early life ==
Born in Belfast, Kirk studied at Queen's University, Belfast before becoming an accountant.

== Career ==
Kirk became active in the Ulster Unionist Party (UUP) and in 1956 was elected to represent Belfast Windsor in the Parliament of Northern Ireland. In 1962, he became the Minister of Labour and National Insurance, also joining the Privy Council of Northern Ireland. In 1964, he moved to become Minister of Education, and the following year, Minister of Finance.

After the abolition of the Parliament, Kirk was elected in Belfast South to the Northern Ireland Assembly, 1973. He was a supporter of Brian Faulkner, and was re-appointed as Minister of Finance (de facto Deputy Prime Minister) until the assembly's suspension in May 1974, after which he quit politics.

Parliament of Northern Ireland
Preceded by Archibald Wilson	Member of Parliament for Belfast Windsor; 1956–1973	Parliament abolished
Northern Ireland Assembly (1973)
New assembly	Assembly Member for South Belfast; 1973–1974	Assembly abolished
Political offices
Preceded by Ivan Neill	Minister of Labour and National Insurance; 1962–64	Succeeded by William James Morgan
Preceded by Ivan Neill	Minister of Education; 1964–65	Succeeded by William Fitzsimmons
Preceded by Ivan Neill	Minister of Finance; 1965–72	Position prorogued 1972; Parliament abolished 1973
