= William Long (Northern Ireland politician) =

Northern Irish politician (1922–2008)

William Joseph Long OBE (23 April 1922 – 10 February 2008) was a Unionist politician in Northern Ireland.

== Early life ==
Long was born in Stockton-on-Tees in England and studied at the Friends' School in Great Ayton, the Royal Veterinary College in Edinburgh and the Royal Military College, Sandhurst. He became an officer in the Royal Inniskilling Fusiliers and was posted to Northern Ireland in 1940. While there, he married Doreen Mercer, a local doctor, and in 1942, the two settled in Northern Ireland.

Long left the British Army in 1948 and became the Secretary of the Northern Ireland Marriage Guidance Council. In 1951, he became Secretary of the Northern Ireland Chest and Heart Association. He joined the Ulster Unionist Party, and was elected to Donaghadee Urban District Council in 1952, serving as chairman from 1955 until 1964. He was also a member of Down County Council Health and Education Committees.

== Parliamentary career ==
At the 1962 Northern Ireland general election, Long was elected MP for Ards. Soon after his election, he made headlines by accusing the management of the Harland and Wolff shipyard of introducing "capital punishment" by sacking 2,000 men during a strike.

Long initially focussed on representing the fishing industry in his constituency, and when Terence O'Neill became Prime Minister in 1964, he appointed Long as Parliamentary Secretary in the Ministry of Agriculture, with special responsibility for fisheries. Long proved loyal to O'Neill and was rewarded in 1966 with promotion to Minister for Education.

Long aimed to integrate Roman Catholic schools into the state school system, which overwhelmingly took pupils from Protestant families. He negotiated a small role for the state in Catholic school governance in exchange for increasing state funding for those schools to cover all their costs. When in October 1968 students linked to the socialist group People's Democracy organised a sit-in, Long joined them but asked them to go home. He refused to sign their petition and was not able to convince them to leave.

== Minister of Home Affairs ==
In December 1968, Long was promoted to Minister of Home Affairs. Initially, he was minded to move to repeal legislation permitting detention without trial. Two weeks after his appointment, People's Democracy activists launched their Belfast-to-Derry march, calling for electoral and legal reform, action to reduce unemployment and to provide decent homes. Long met with Ian Paisley and Ronald Bunting, who called on him to ban the march. Long refused to so, and the march set off. It was attacked by loyalists on several occasions, finally at Burntollet Bridge where there were numerous injuries. Long claimed that Paisley and Bunting had not "threatened or hinted that their followers would cause any trouble in Derry", and claimed that Paisley's supporters had not participated in the violence. The Belfast Telegraph disputed this, and claimed that Long was being partisan.

The following week, People's Democracy organised a march in Newry. It was again surrounded by violence, and several police officers were injured. O'Neill claimed that this showed that People's Democracy was not a non-violent organisation. He responded to this by introducing a new Public Order Bill, which amended the Public Order Act (Northern Ireland) 1951 and among other measures made it an offence to knowingly take part in an illegal procession or meeting.

== Later political career ==
After only three months as Minister of Home Affairs, in March 1969, Long moved to become Minister of Development. He was appointed to a four-person cabinet Security Committee which, in April, decided to request British troops to maintain order. Long loyally supported O'Neill, and when he resigned in May, many people expected Long to lose his cabinet role. Instead, new Prime Minister James Chichester-Clark moved Long back to the Minister of Education post.

In August 1969, Long had a 95-minute meeting with Paisley. Paisley had a list of demands to which Long listened patiently but did not act upon. He attended the funerals of some members of the Royal Ulster Constabulary and British Army who were killed in The Troubles, and placed more welfare officers in inner city schools after claiming that riots were poisoning children's minds.

Long remained in post under Brian Faulkner, despite speculation that he might resign in protest at increased use of internment. When British Prime Minister Edward Heath imposed direct rule, Long protested that this was merely a political gambit, in exchange for Labour Party leader Harold Wilson softening his party's opposition to Britain joining the Common Market. He opposed Willie Whitelaw's reduced use of internment, claiming that "there is no doubt units of the IRA that have been broken down by internment have been able to become active again".

Long was also President of the Yorkshire Association for a British Ulster; in April 1974, a member was charged with gun running to violent loyalists, a group which Long had described as "the very antithesis of Loyalism".

== Life after politics ==
Out of politics, Long became the owner and skipper of a fishing boat, and also the Chief Executive of the Northern Ireland Fish Producers' Association. In 1982, he chaired the UK Association of Fish Producing Organisations. He was appointed an Officer of the Order of the British Empire (OBE) in the 1985 New Year Honours, and retired in 1987, soon moving to North Yorkshire. In 2007, he married Valerie Bryans, who had been his secretary at Stormont.

Parliament of Northern Ireland
Preceded by William May	Member of Parliament for Ards; 1962–1973	Parliament abolished
Political offices
Vacant	Parliamentary Secretary at the Ministry of Agriculture; 1964–1965	Office abolished
Preceded by William Fitzsimmons	Minister of Education; 1966–1968	Succeeded by William Fitzsimmons
Preceded by William Craig	Minister of Home Affairs; 1968–1969	Succeeded by Robert Porter
Preceded by Ivan Neill	Minister of Development; 1969	Succeeded by Brian Faulkner
Preceded by Phelim O'Neill	Minister of Education; 1969–1972	Office abolished
