= Minister of Development (Northern Ireland) =

Minister of Development was a Cabinet ministry in the Parliament of Northern Ireland which governed Northern Ireland from 1921 to 1972. The position was established in 1965 to mirror the United Kingdom Department of the Environment.

#	Name	Took office	Prime Minister	Party
1.	William Craig	1 January 1965	O'Neill	UUP
2.	William Fitzsimmons	7 October 1966	O'Neill	UUP
3.	Ivan Neill	19 December 1968	O'Neill	UUP
	Vacant	3 March 1969	O'Neill	UUP
4.	William Long	12 March 1969	O'Neill	UUP
5.	Brian Faulkner	3 May 1969	Chichester-Clark	UUP
6.	Roy Bradford	25 March 1971	Faulkner	UUP
