= Walter Topping =

Politician from Northern Ireland

Walter William Buchanan Topping (1908–26 July 1978) was a unionist politician in Northern Ireland.

Topping studied at the Rossall School and Queen's University Belfast, before becoming a barrister in 1930. During World War II, he served as a Lieutenant-Colonel in the Royal Artillery. He was elected to the Parliament of Northern Ireland in 1945 as the Ulster Unionist Party member for Larne, serving as Parliamentary Secretary to the Ministry of Finance - effectively the Chief Whip - from 1947 until 1956, then as the Minister of Home Affairs. He resigned in 1959 to become the Recorder of Belfast, serving until 1978. In 1967, he became a member of the Privy Council of Northern Ireland.

Parliament of Northern Ireland
Preceded by Harold Claude Robinson	Member of Parliament for Larne; 1945–1960	Succeeded by William Craig
Party political offices
Preceded by Lancelot Curran	Unionist Chief Whip; 1947–1956	Succeeded by Brian Faulkner
Political offices
Preceded by Lancelot Curran	Parliamentary Secretary to the Ministry of Finance; 1947–1956	Succeeded by Brian Faulkner
Preceded by Terence O'Neill	Minister of Home Affairs; 1956–1959	Succeeded by Brian Faulkner
