= Minister of Finance (Northern Ireland) =

The minister of finance (de facto deputy prime minister) was a member of the Executive Committee of the Privy Council of Northern Ireland (Cabinet) in the Parliament of Northern Ireland which governed Northern Ireland from 1921 to 1972. The post was combined with that of the prime minister of Northern Ireland for a brief period in 1940–1941 and was vacant for two weeks during 1953, following the death of incumbent minister John Maynard Sinclair. The office was often seen as being occupied by the prime minister's choice of successor. Two ministers of finance went on to be prime minister, while two more, Maginness and Jack Andrews, were widely seen as possible successors to the premiership.

#	Name	Took office	Prime Minister	Party
1.	Hugh MacDowell Pollock	7 June 1921	Craigavon	UUP
2.	J. M. Andrews	21 April 1937	Craigavon, Andrews	UUP
3.	John Milne Barbour	16 January 1941	Andrews	UUP
4.	John Maynard Sinclair	6 May 1943	Brookeborough	UUP
	Vacant	31 January 1953	Brookeborough	N/A
5.	Brian Maginess	13 February 1953	Brookeborough	UUP
6.	George Hanna	20 April 1956	Brookeborough	UUP
7.	Terence O'Neill	21 September 1956	Brookeborough	UUP
8.	Jack Andrews	25 March 1963	O'Neill	UUP
9.	Ivan Neill	22 July 1964	O'Neill	UUP
10.	Herbert Kirk	2 April 1965	O'Neill, Chichester-Clark, Faulkner	UUP

== Deputy Prime Minister ==
From 3 May 1969, a separate and distinct office of Deputy Prime Minister was created and occupied by Jack Andrews, who was also Leader of the Senate.

== Parliamentary and Financial Secretary to the Ministry of Finance ==
- 1921 – 1937 Milne Barbour
- 1937 – 1940 Alexander Gordon
- 1940 – 1941 vacant
- 1941 – 1943 Maynard Sinclair

Office abolished 1943

== Parliamentary Secretary to the Ministry of Finance (and Chief Whip) ==
- 1921 – 1942 Herbert Dixon, 1st Baron Glentoran
- 1942 – 1944 Sir Norman Stronge
- 1944 – 1945 Sir Wilson Hungerford
- 1945 – 1947 Lancelot Curran
- 1947 – 1956 Walter Topping
- 1956 – 1959 Brian Faulkner
- 1959 – 1963 Isaac George Hawthorne
- 1963: William Craig
- 1963 – 1966 James Chichester-Clark
- 1966 – 1968 vacant
- 1968 – 1969 Roy Bradford

Office abolished 1969

=== Assistant Parliamentary Secretary to the Ministry of Finance (and Assistant Chief Whip) ===
- 1921 – 1925 Thomas Henry Burn
- 1925 – 1929 Henry Mulholland
- 1929 – 1933 Sir Basil Brooke
- 1933 – 1941 Sir Wilson Hungerford
- 1941 – 1942 Sir Norman Stronge
- 1942 – 1943 Robert Corkey
- 1943 – 1945 vacant
- 1945 – 1958 John Edgar Bailey
- 1958 Harry West
- 1958 – 1961 William James Morgan
- 1961 – 1963 William Fitzsimmons
- 1963 James Chichester-Clark
- 1963 – 1965 vacant
- 1965 – 1966 Isaac George Hawthorne
- 1966 – 1967 Roy Bradford and Samuel Magowan
- 1967 – 1968 Samuel Magowan and vacancy
- 1968 – 1969 Samuel Magowan and Joseph Burns
- 1969 Samuel Magowan and John William Kennedy

Office abolished 1969
