= Jack Andrews =

British politician (1903–1986)

The Right Honourable Sir Jack Andrews KBE DL

Deputy Prime Minister of Northern Ireland
- In office 3 May 1969 – 30 March 1972

Minister in the Senate of the Government of Northern Ireland
- In office 7 August 1964 – 30 March 1972

Member of the Senate of Northern Ireland
- In office 1964–1972

Member of the Northern Ireland Parliament for Mid Down
- In office 1953–1964
- Preceded by: J. M. Andrews
- Succeeded by: Basil Kelly

Personal details
- Born: 15 July 1903
- Died: 12 January 1986 (aged 82)
- Party: Ulster Unionist Party
- Parent: J. M. Andrews (father)

Sir John Lawson Ormrod Andrews KBE DL PC (Ire) (15 July 1903 – 12 January 1986) was a member of both the Northern Ireland House of Commons and the Senate of Northern Ireland.

Son of Prime Minister J. M. Andrews, he was educated at Moure Grange Preparatory School, County Down, and Shrewsbury School. Andrews entered Parliament as MP for Mid Down in 1953 (replacing his father), a seat which he represented until his resignation in 1964, when he was elected to the Senate where he sat until the Parliament was prorogued in 1972. His election to the senate was following a cabinet reshuffle, in which Andrews accepted demotion to the politically unimportant position of Government Minister in the Senate.

He held several Cabinet positions, including Minister in the Senate from 1964 and Deputy Prime Minister from May 1969. He was a contender for the position of Prime Minister on the retirement of Lord Brookeborough, but when it became clear that Terence O'Neill had a comfortable lead over both Andrews and Brian Faulkner in the parliamentary party, no contest was held. In 1969 he was approached by O'Neill to succeed him, but he refused and James Chichester-Clark was elected

During the 1970 Bannside and South Antrim by-elections, Andrews was at the centre of the UUP's pluralist campaign against Ian Paisley's Protestant Unionist Party, declaring "What does Protestant Unionism mean? Does it mean that you have to put a sign over the door of the Unionist Party saying Protestants only?"

Andrews was knighted in 1973. In retirement, he served as President of the Unionist Party of Northern Ireland.

Parliament of Northern Ireland
Preceded by John Millar Andrews	Member of Parliament for Mid Down; 1953–1964	Succeeded by John William Basil Kelly
Political offices
Preceded by Dehra Parker	Minister of Health and Local Government; 1957–1961	Succeeded by William James Morgan
Preceded by Daniel Dixon	Minister of Commerce and Production; 1961–1963	Succeeded by Brian Faulkner
Preceded by Terence O'Neill	Minister of Finance; 1963–1964	Succeeded by Ivan Neill
New office	Deputy Prime Minister of Northern Ireland; 1969–1972	Office dissolved
