= Minister of Home Affairs (Northern Ireland) =

The Minister of Home Affairs was a member of the Executive Committee of the Privy Council of Northern Ireland (Cabinet) in the Parliament of Northern Ireland which governed Northern Ireland from 1921 to 1972. The Minister of Home Affairs was responsible for a range of non-economic domestic matters, although for a few months in 1953 the office was combined with that of the Minister of Finance.

Under the Civil Authorities (Special Powers) Act (Northern Ireland) 1922, the Minister was enabled to make any regulation necessary to preserve or re-establish law and order in Northern Ireland. The act specifically entitled him to ban parades, meetings, and publications, and to forbid inquests.

One of the position's more problematic duties was responsibility for parades in Northern Ireland under the Special Powers Act and from 1951 the Public Order Act. Parading was (and is) extremely contentious in Northern Ireland, and so the Minister was bound to anger one community or other regardless of what decision he made. Ministers generally allowed parades by the Orange Order and other Protestant groups to go where they wanted, while restricting nationalist parades to Catholic areas and banning republican or anti-partitionist parades. Communist and other far-left parades were also sometimes banned. From time to time ministers, for example Brian Maginess, attempted to administer the parading issue more fairly, but usually suffered career damage as a result. The parading issue may be the reason why the Home Affairs portfolio changed hands more often than most other Ministerial positions.

In 1970, the office was combined with that of Prime Minister of Northern Ireland with John Taylor serving as a cabinet rank junior minister, and then abolished along with the rest of the Northern Irish government in 1973.

#	Name	Took office	Prime Minister	Party
1.	Dawson Bates	7 June 1921	Craig, Andrews	UUP
2.	William Lowry	6 May 1943	Brooke	UUP
3.	Edmond Warnock	3 November 1944	Brooke	UUP
4.	Brian Maginess	21 June 1946	Brooke	UUP
5.	Edmond Warnock	11 September 1946	Brooke	UUP
6.	Brian Maginess	4 November 1949	Brooke	UUP
7.	George Hanna	26 October 1953	Brookeborough	UUP
8.	Terence O'Neill	20 April 1956	Brookeborough	UUP
9.	W. W. B. Topping	23 October 1956	Brookeborough	UUP
10.	Brian Faulkner	15 December 1959	Brookeborough	UUP
11.	William Craig	29 April 1963	O'Neill	UUP
12.	Brian McConnell	22 July 1964	O'Neill	UUP
13.	William Craig	7 October 1966	O'Neill	UUP
14.	William Long	11 December 1968	O'Neill	UUP
15.	Robert Porter	12 March 1969	O'Neill, Chichester-Clark	UUP
16.	James Chichester-Clark	26 August 1970	Chichester-Clark	UUP
17.	Brian Faulkner	23 March 1971	Faulkner	UUP

== Ministers of State ==
- 1970–1972 John Taylor

== Senior Parliamentary Secretaries ==
- 1971–1972 Albert Anderson

== Parliamentary Secretary to the Ministry of Home Affairs ==
- 1921 – 1925 Robert Dick Megaw
- 1925 – 1937 George Hanna
- 1937 – 1938 John Clarke Davison
- 1938 – 1940 Edmond Warnock
- 1940 – 1943 William Lowry
- 1943 – 1944 Wilson Hungerford
- 1944 – 1955 vacant
- 1955 – 1956 Terence O'Neill
- 1956 – 1963 vacant
- 1963 – 1964 William Kennedy Fitzsimmons
- 1964 – 1969 vacant
- 1969 Robert Porter
- 1969 – 1970 John Taylor
- 1970 office abolished
