= William Fitzsimmons (Northern Ireland politician) =

Northern Ireland politician (1909–1992)

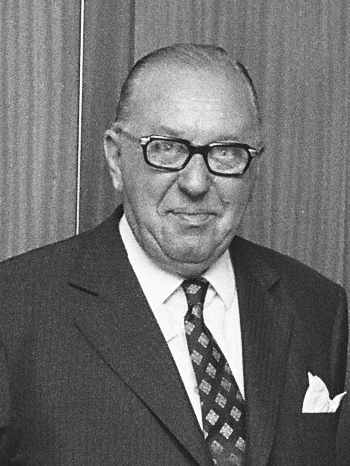
- Fitsimmons in 1971

Member of Parliament for Belfast Duncairn
- In office 1956–1973

Minister of Health and Social Services, Northern Ireland
- In office 1969–1972

Minister of Development, Northern Ireland
- In office 1966–1968

Minister of Education, Northern Ireland
- In office 1965-1966; 1968–1969

Unionist Assistant Whip
- In office 1961–1963

Personal details
- Born: 31 January 1909 Belfast, Ireland
- Died: 21 February 1992 (aged 83)
- Party: Ulster Unionist
- Education: Belfast Technical College

William Kennedy Fitzsimmons (31 January 1909 – 21 February 1992) was a Unionist politician in Northern Ireland.

== Biography ==
Born in Belfast, Fitzsimmons studied at Skegoneill National School and Belfast Technical College. He became a domestic engineer, and in 1948 was appointed as a Belfast Water Commissioner, serving as chairman of the Commissioners from 1954 to 1955. In 1951, he became a justice of the peace.

Fitzsimmons was also an active member of the Ulster Unionist Party and was the President of Duncairn Unionist Association. He was elected to the Parliament of Northern Ireland at a by-election in 1956, representing Belfast Duncairn. In 1961, he was made Assistant Parliamentary Secretary to the Ministry of Finance, an assistant whip position. He also became Parliamentary Secretary to the Ministry of Commerce. He was then rotated through a series of Parliamentary Secretary positions, serving with the Ministry of Home Affairs from 1963 to 1964, the Ministry of Health and Local Government from 1964 to 1966 and also the Ministry of Development for a period in 1965.

In April 1965, Fitzsimmons was finally appointed to a Cabinet position, becoming Minister of Education. He moved to become Minister of Development in 1966, back to Education in 1968 and finally served as Minister of Health and Social Services from 1969 until the Parliament was prorogued in 1972.

In 1968, Fitzsimmons' daughter married a Roman Catholic. As a result, he resigned from the Orange Order. At the 1969, former independent Unionist Member of Parliament Norman Porter stood against Fitzsimmons as a candidate whose opposition to Catholicism was in no doubt, but Fitzsimmons held his seat.

At the Darlington Conference of 1973, Fitzsimmons served on the small Unionist team. Later in the year, he decided not to stand in the Northern Ireland Assembly election.

Parliament of Northern Ireland
Preceded by George Hanna	Member of Parliament for Belfast Duncairn; 1956–1973	Parliament abolished
Party political offices
Preceded by William James Morgan	Unionist Assistant Whip; 1961–1963	Succeeded by James Chichester-Clark
Political offices
Preceded by William James Morgan	Assistant Parliamentary Secretary to the Ministry of Finance; 1961–1963	Succeeded by James Chichester-Clark
Preceded by Brian McConnell	Parliamentary Secretary to the Ministry of Health and Local Government; 1964-1965	Vacant
Vacant	Parliamentary Secretary to the Ministry of Commerce and Production; 1961–1965	Vacant
Vacant Title last held by Terence O'Neill	Parliamentary Secretary to the Ministry of Home Affairs; 1963–1964	Vacant Title next held by Robert Porter
Preceded by Herbert Kirk	Minister of Education; 1965–1966	Succeeded by William Long
Preceded by William Craig	Minister of Development; 1966–1968	Succeeded by Ivan Neill
Preceded by William Long	Minister of Education; 1968–1969	Succeeded by Phelim O'Neill
Preceded by Robert Porter	Minister of Health and Social Services; 1969–1972	Position abolished
