= William Craig (Northern Ireland politician) =

Northern Irish politician

Leader of the Vanguard Unionist Progressive Party
- In office February 1972 – February 1978
- Deputy: Reg Empey; Glenn Barr; David Trimble
- Preceded by: Office created
- Succeeded by: Office abolished

Member of Parliament for Belfast East
- In office 28 February 1974 – 7 April 1979
- Preceded by: Stanley McMaster
- Succeeded by: Peter Robinson

Member of the Constitutional Convention for Belfast East
- In office 1 May 1975 – 1975
- Preceded by: Convention created
- Succeeded by: Convention dissolved

Member of the Legislative Assembly for North Antrim
- In office 28 June 1973 – 1974
- Preceded by: Assembly established
- Succeeded by: Assembly abolished

Member of the Northern Ireland Parliament for Larne
- In office 5 February 1960 – 1972
- Preceded by: Walter Topping
- Succeeded by: Parliament abolished

Personal details
- Born: 2 December 1924 Cookstown, Northern Ireland
- Died: 24 April 2011 (aged 86) Dundonald, County Down, Northern Ireland
- Party: Ulster Unionist (pre 1972; 1978-1982); Ulster Vanguard (1972 - 1978)
- Spouse: Doris Hilgendorff (m. 1960)
- Children: 2
- Education: Queen's University, Belfast
- Profession: Solicitor

Military service
- Allegiance: United Kingdom
- Branch/service: Royal Air Force
- Years of service: 1943–1945
- Battles/wars: World War II

William Craig (2 December 1924 – 24 April 2011) was a Northern Irish unionist politician and solicitor, best known for forming the Unionist Vanguard movement.

== Early life ==
From Cookstown, County Tyrone. His father William was a manager in the Ulster Bank, including the Ballyconnell branch between 1938-1941. Craig was educated at Royal School Dungannon, Larne Grammar School and Queen's University Belfast.

After serving in the Royal Air Force (as a Lancaster bomber rear gunner) during World War II, he became a solicitor.

== Politics ==
He was active in the Ulster Unionist Party (UUP) and led the Ulster Young Unionist Council. He was elected to the Stormont Parliament in a by-election in 1960 for Larne, and became a Minister in 1963. He held several portfolios under Terence O'Neill, eventually as Minister for Home Affairs. His most notable action while in this office was to ban the march of the Northern Ireland Civil Rights Association on 5 October 1968. He also accused the civil rights movement of being a political front for the IRA.

On 11 December 1968, O'Neill dismissed Craig when he suspected Craig was a supporter of Ulster nationalism. Craig began to build a power base for himself within unionism, becoming head of the Ulster Loyalist Association. The UUP withdrew the whip from him in May 1970; Craig then began to make plans to form his own political party. The Ulster Vanguard movement was formed on 9 February 1972 under Craig's leadership (the Deputy Leaders were the Reverend Martin Smyth and Captain Austin Ardill).

Ulster Vanguard advocated a semi-independent Northern Ireland. Vanguard held a large rally on 18 March 1972 in Belfast's Ormeau Park at which Craig said "We must build up the dossiers on the men and women who are a menace to this country, because one day, ladies and gentlemen, if the politicians fail, it may be our job to liquidate the enemy". Vanguard also staged a two-day strike in protest at the prorogation of the Stormont Parliament.

In April 1972, Vanguard issued a policy statement "Ulster – A Nation" which said that Northern Ireland might have to consider independence. In October, he spoke at a meeting of the Conservative Monday Club, a group of right-wing Conservative MPs at Westminster. He told them he could mobilise 80,000 men to oppose the UK Government, adding: "We are prepared to come out and shoot and kill. I am prepared to come out and shoot and kill, let's put the bluff aside". In March 1973, the Ulster Vanguard became the Vanguard Unionist Progressive Party.

The Vanguard Unionists under Craig formed part of the United Ulster Unionist Council which opposed the power-sharing Sunningdale Agreement. Craig was elected to the Northern Ireland Assembly created under the Sunningdale Agreement, and he won a seat in the UK Parliament at the February 1974 general election for East Belfast. However, in the Northern Ireland Constitutional Convention in the mid-1970s, Craig broke with the majority of his party to support voluntary power-sharing with the Social Democratic and Labour Party. The Vanguard Unionists fell apart, with one section forming the United Ulster Unionist Party. Craig led the remains of Vanguard in rejoining the Ulster Unionist Party in 1978, but lost his seat at the 1979 general election.

Craig subsequently broke with the Ulster Unionists once more. When elections were held for the new Northern Ireland Assembly in 1982, Craig revived the name Vanguard for his candidacy in East Belfast. However, he failed to be elected. That marked the effective end of Craig's political career.

Many historians have agreed that Craig found it difficult to accept that Northern Ireland had to make social and economic reforms. Craig led opposition to those proposals throughout the premierships of Terence O'Neill, James Chichester-Clark and Brian Faulkner. Although he showed few intentions when he became the leader of the Unionist Vanguard movement, he showed public intention to form a Northern Ireland Executive in 1975 with the Social Democratic and Labour Party, along with the Alliance Party and Ulster Unionist Party. That is mainly overshadowed due to his early political beliefs and refusal to accept reform and change to Northern Irish society.

== Personal life and death ==
In 1960, Craig married Doris Hilgendorff, and they had two children.

After a long period away from public life, Craig died at the Ulster Hospital on 24 April 2011, aged 86, from complications of a stroke he suffered the previous month.

Parliament of Northern Ireland
Preceded by Walter Topping	Member of Parliament for Larne; 1960–1973	Parliament abolished
Northern Ireland Assembly (1973)
New assembly	Assembly Member for North Antrim; 1973–1974	Assembly abolished
Parliament of the United Kingdom
Preceded by Stanley McMaster	Member of Parliament for Belfast East; 1974–1979	Succeeded by Peter Robinson
Northern Ireland Constitutional Convention
New convention	Member for East Belfast; 1975–1976	Convention dissolved
Party political offices
Preceded by Isaac George Hawthorne	Unionist Chief Whip; 1963	Succeeded by James Chichester-Clark
New political party	Leader of the Vanguard Progressive Unionist Party; 1973–1978	Party dissolved
Political offices
Preceded by Isaac George Hawthorne	Parliamentary Secretary to the Ministry of Finance; 1963	Succeeded by James Chichester-Clark
Preceded by Brian Faulkner	Minister of Home Affairs; 1963–1964	Succeeded by Brian McConnell
Preceded by William Morgan	Minister of Health and Local Government; 1964–1965	Succeeded by William Morgan
New office	Minister of Development; 1965–1966	Succeeded by William Kennedy Fitzsimmons
Preceded by Brian McConnell	Minister of Home Affairs; 1966–1968	Succeeded by William Long
