= Privy Council of Northern Ireland =

Coat of Arms of Northern Ireland

The Privy Council of Northern Ireland is a dormant privy council formerly advising the Governor of Northern Ireland in his role as viceroy of the British Crown, in particular in the exercise of the monarch's prerogative powers. The council was the successor within Northern Ireland of the Privy Council of Ireland, which offered advice to the Lord Lieutenant of Ireland.

== Creation ==
The Government of Ireland Act 1920 effected the 1921 partition of Ireland by creating separate home rule jurisdictions of Northern Ireland and Southern Ireland. The 1920 act preserved some all-island institutions, among them the Lord Lieutenant and Privy Council of Ireland. Thus, the first Parliament of Northern Ireland was summoned after the 1921 election by the Lord Lieutenant, and the first Government of Northern Ireland comprised members of the Privy Council of Ireland. The failure of Southern Ireland in the face of militant republican opposition led to its replacement by the Irish Free State in 1922. The Irish Free State (Consequential Provisions) Act 1922 abolished the Lord Lieutenant and created the Governor and Privy Council of Northern Ireland to take over their respective functions in that part of Ireland. In the other part, the Executive Council of the Irish Free State took over from the Privy Council of Ireland, which was not formally abolished but became obsolete. The New Testament volume used to swear in members of the Privy Council of Northern Ireland was the same one previously used for the Privy Council of Ireland.

== Functions ==
John Andrew Oliver, a senior Northern Ireland civil servant, described the Privy Council of Northern Ireland in 1978 as "an extremely formal body that performed mysterious functions behind firmly closed doors". The Council's proceedings were pure formalities, with no debate or discussion. Not all councillors attended all meetings, which were usually met at Hillsborough Castle, the official residence of the Governor. The Governor was not ex officio a member of the council but he (or deputising Lords Justices) presided at its meetings.

In London, the "King in Council" (the King advised by the UK Privy Council) performed such ceremonial functions as summoning, opening, recalling, proroguing, and dissolving the UK Parliament and issuing Orders in Council to effect secondary legislation; similarly, in Northern Ireland the "Governor in Council" performed corresponding functions for its parliament, and issued Orders in Council on devolved matters. The council was also the authority for making rules of court for the Courts of Northern Ireland. The Governor's throne speech was formally ordered to be presented to Parliament by members of the Commons and Senate who were Privy Councillors.

Just as the Cabinet of the United Kingdom is formally a committee of the UK Privy Council, so the Government of Northern Ireland was formally the Executive Committee of the Privy Council of Northern Ireland; newly nominated ministers were sworn into the council before formally joining the government. Another committee of the council was inherited under the Irish Universities Act 1908, and dealt with petitions relating to Queen's University Belfast. Lords Justices for the government of Northern Ireland, deputising in the absence of the Governor, were sworn at a meeting of the council.

The Clerk and Deputy Clerk of the Northern Ireland Privy Council were appointed by the Governor, and also served as Clerk and Deputy Clerk of the Cabinet Offices within the Department of the Prime Minister of Northern Ireland. There was no privy seal.

== Supersession ==
The last appointments to the Privy Council of Northern Ireland were made in 1971. In consequence of the Troubles, the Heath UK government introduced direct rule under the Northern Ireland (Temporary Provisions) Act 1972, by suspending Northern Ireland's devolved administration and transferring its powers to the Secretary of State for Northern Ireland, a new position in the UK Cabinet. The Northern Ireland Constitution Act 1973 formally abolished most of the suspended institutions, including the governorship. The Privy Council of Northern Ireland was not abolished, but new appointments were prohibited, and all of its functions were transferred to the Secretary of State. Existing members retained "their existing rank and style and obligations". Lists of living members continued to be included in Whitaker's Almanack until 2018 and Dod's Parliamentary Companion until 2001. In 1994, the minutes of about 300 council meetings were deposited with the Public Record Office of Northern Ireland.

=== Proposed revival ===
The 1976 majority report of the Northern Ireland Constitutional Convention recommended "That there should be a Privy Council of Northern Ireland in which some places should be offered to leading members of major opposition parties." As the report was an essentially unionist document, the Callaghan UK government did not accept its recommendations. John Andrew Oliver suggested in 1978 that any revival should be a "Governor’s Council" with "a wider membership and a door much more open to publicity", including more Catholic/nationalists.

== Members ==
Members were appointed for life, although the governor was empowered to remove them. They are entitled to use the prefix The Right Honourable, and to use the post-nominal letters PC (NI). Two members are still living as of November 2025: Lord Kilclooney (appointed 1970) and Robin Bailie (appointed 1971).

Apart from ministers in the Government of Northern Ireland, any appointment by the governor to the Privy Council of Northern Ireland required the approval of the UK Home Secretary. Other officers typically appointed included the Commons Speaker, Senate Speaker, senior judges and senior civil servants.

In 1970, the Northern Ireland Nationalist Party submitted to the Royal Commission on the Constitution, "Not since [Denis Henry] the Catholic Lord Chief Justice died in 1925 has there been a Catholic member of the Privy Council of Northern Ireland which ostensibly is a non-partisan, non-political body advising the Governor in the interests of all the people." Another Catholic, G. B. Newe, was appointed on 27 October 1971 when becoming minister of state in the Faulkner ministry. Newe's was not a cabinet ministry and did not require him to be a Privy Counsellor, but both appointments were intended by Brian Faulkner as a conciliatory gesture to Catholics.

== Sources ==
- "Government of Ireland Act 1920 [as enacted]".
- "Irish Free State (Consequential Provisions) Act 1922 [as amended to 1933]".
- "Northern Ireland Constitution Act 1973".
- Quekett, Arthur S. (1933). The Constitution Of Northern Ireland. Vol. II. Belfast: HMSO.

== See also ==
- List of Northern Ireland members of the Privy Council of the United Kingdom
