= 1969 Northern Ireland general election =

- 24 February 1969

All 52 seats to the House of Commons of Northern Ireland 27 seats were needed for a majority
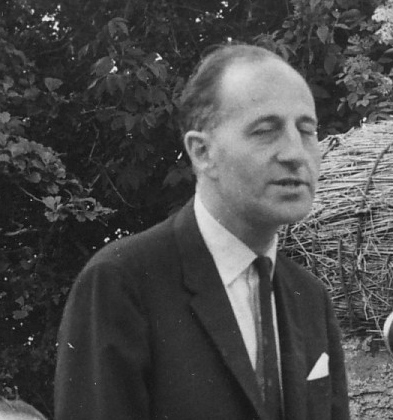
	First party	Second party
		Nat
Leader	Terence O'Neill	Eddie McAteer
Party	UUP	Nationalist
Leader since	25 March 1963	2 June 1964
Leader's seat	Bannside	Foyle (Lost)
Last election	36 seats, 59.1%	9 seats, 8.2%
Seats won	36 (Note: Pro-O'Neill (23 members) Anti-O'Neill (13 members))	6
Seat change	Steady	▼3
Popular vote	269,501	42,315
Percentage	48.2%	7.6%
Swing	▼10.9%	▼0.6%
	Third party	Fourth party
Leader	Tom Boyd	Gerry Fitt
Party	NI Labour	Republican Labour
Leader since	1958	1964
Leader's seat	Belfast Pottinger (Lost)	Belfast Dock
Last election	2 seats, 20.4%	2 seats, 1.0%
Seats won	2	2
Seat change	Steady	Steady
Popular vote	45,113	13,115
Percentage	8.1%	1.4%
Swing	▼12.3%	▲0.4%
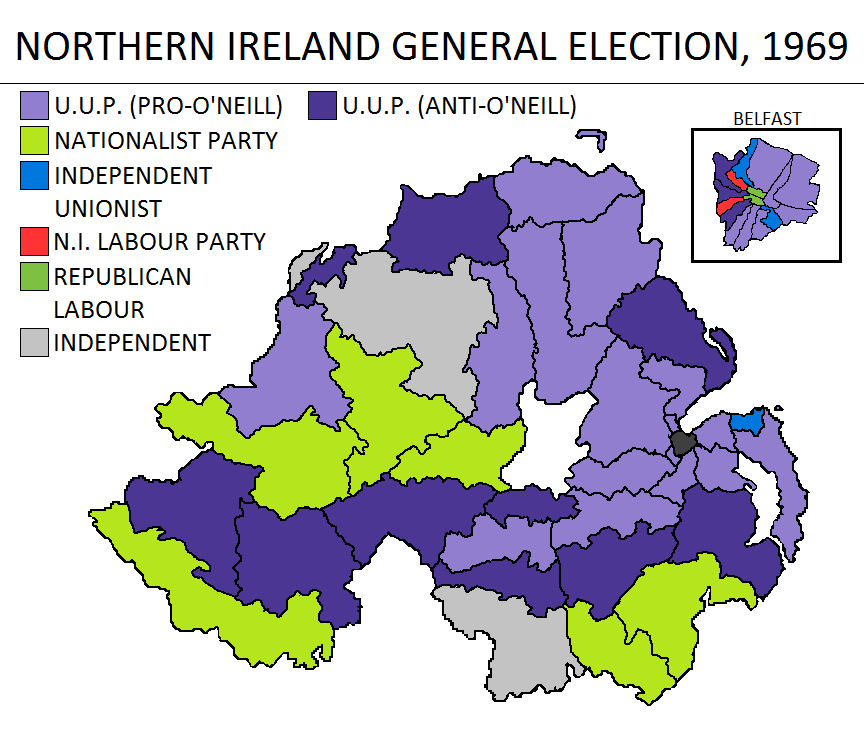
- Election results by constituency
Prime Minister before election
Terence O'Neill
UUP
Prime Minister after election
Terence O'Neill
UUP

The 1969 Northern Ireland general election was held on Monday 24 February 1969. It was the last election to the Parliament of Northern Ireland before its abolition by the Northern Ireland Constitution Act 1973.

This was the first (and only) election since the 1929 general election to see changes to the constituencies. The Queen's University of Belfast seat was abolished and four new constituencies were created in the suburbs of Belfast to compensate for population growth there.

== Overview ==
Unlike previous elections that produced a large unambiguous majority for the Ulster Unionist Party, this one gave more complex results.

The Ulster Unionists were divided over a variety of reforms introduced by Prime Minister Terence O'Neill and this division spilled over into the election with official Ulster Unionist candidates standing either in support of or opposition to O'Neill and a number of Unofficial Unionists, who were independent pro O'Neill candidates standing against unsupportive Official Unionist candidates. The results left O'Neill without a clear majority for his reforms and he resigned not long afterwards.

=== Nationalist realignment ===
The Nationalist Party that had for a long time represented the bulk of the Catholic minority faced strong challenges and two of its leading figures were defeated. The leader Eddie McAteer lost Foyle to the independent John Hume and Paddy Gormley lost Mid Londonderry to the independent Ivan Cooper. Both Hume and Cooper would go on to form the Social Democratic and Labour Party which would take over the Nationalist mantle.

=== Protestant Unionist Party ===
Ian Paisley's Protestant Unionist Party that was broadly opposed to O'Neill's agenda on civil rights, put up a number of candidates. Although none of them were returned O'Neill was almost defeated by Paisley in Bannside a seat that had not been contested since 1949. Paisley gained the seat at a 1970 by-election.

=== Unofficial Unionists ===
Due to the local selection rules a number of anti-O'Neill candidates managed to get reselected or selected for seats. Many of them were opposed by 17 unofficial Unionist candidates supporting O'Neill, often backed by the New Ulster Movement. They won three seats - Belfast Clifton (where the sitting Unionist MP for was forbidden by a court order from referring to himself as the official Unionist candidate because of a violation of the rules at his selection meeting); Bangor and Belfast Willowfield.

== Results ==
↓
36	6	3	3	2	2
UUP	Nationalist	UU	Ind	NILP	Rep

Northern Ireland General Election 1969
Party	Candidates						Votes		
Party	Stood	Elected	Gained	Unseated	Net	% of total	%	No.	Net %
UUP	44	36	4	4	0	69.2	48.2	269,501	-10.9
Unofficial Unionist	15	3	3	0	+3	5.8	12.9	72,120	+12.9
NI Labour	16	2	1	1	0	3.8	8.1	45,113	-12.3
Nationalist	9	6	0	3	-3	11.5	7.6	42,315	-0.6
National Democratic	7	0	0	1	-1		4.6	26,009	-0.1
People's Democracy	8	0	0	0	0		4.2	23,645	+4.2
Independent	4	3	3	1	+2	5.8	3.9	21,977	+3.9
Protestant Unionist	5	0	0	0	0		3.8	20,991	+3.8
Ind. Unionist	3	0	0	0	0		2.5	13,932	+2.5
Republican Labour	5	2	1	1	0	3.8	2.4	13,115	+1.4
Ulster Liberal	2	0	0	1	-1		1.3	7,337	-2.6
People's Progressive	1	0	0	0	0		0.5	2,992	+0.5

Electorate: 912,087 (778,031 in contested seats); Turnout: 71.9% (559,087).

=== Votes summary ===
Popular vote
Ulster Unionist Party	48.2%
Unofficial Unionist	12.9%
Labour	8.1%
Nationalist	7.6%
National Democratic	4.7%
Independent	3.8%
Peoples' Democracy	4.2%
Protestant Unionist	3.8%
Independent Unionist	2.5%
Republican Labour	2.4%
Ulster Liberal	1.3%
People's Progressive	0.5%

=== Seats summary ===
Parliamentary seats
Ulster Unionist Party	69.2%
Nationalist	11.5%
Independent	5.8%
Unofficial Unionist	5.8%
Labour	3.9%
Republican Labour	3.9%

== See also ==
- List of members of the 12th House of Commons of Northern Ireland
