= Prime Minister of Northern Ireland =

Head of the Northern Ireland government (1921–72)

- Arms of the Executive Committee
- Nominator: House of Commons
- Appointer: Governor of Northern Ireland
- Term length: At His Majesty's pleasure so long as General Elections are held no more than five years apart.
- Inaugural holder: Sir James Craig
- Formation: 7 June 1921
- Final holder: Brian Faulkner
- Abolished: 30 March 1972 (suspended); 18 July 1973 (abolished; suspended in 1972 and then abolished in 1973, along with the contemporary government, when direct rule of Northern Ireland was transferred to London.
- Succession: Chief and deputy-Chief Executive (1 Jan–28 May 1974); First Minister and deputy First Minister (1 July 1998–)

The prime minister of Northern Ireland was the head of the Government of Northern Ireland between 1921 and 1972. No such office was provided for in the Government of Ireland Act 1920; however, the Lord Lieutenant of Ireland, as with governors-general in other Westminster systems such as in Canada, chose to appoint someone to head the executive even though no such post existed in statute law. The office-holder assumed the title prime minister to draw parallels with the prime minister of the United Kingdom. On the advice of the new prime minister, the lord lieutenant then created the Department of the Prime Minister. The office of Prime Minister of Northern Ireland was suspended in 1972 and then abolished in 1973, along with the contemporary government, when direct rule of Northern Ireland was transferred to London.

The Government of Ireland Act provided for the appointment of the executive committee of the Privy Council of Northern Ireland by the governor. No parliamentary vote was required. Nor, theoretically, was the executive committee and its prime minister responsible to the House of Commons of Northern Ireland. In reality the governor chose the leader of the party with a majority in the House to form a government. On each occasion this was the leader of the Ulster Unionist Party; such was the UUP's electoral dominance using both a simple plurality and for the first two elections, a proportional electoral system. All prime ministers of Northern Ireland were members of the Orange Order.

The prime minister's residence from 1920 until 1922 was Cabin Hill, later to become the junior school for Campbell College. After 1922 Stormont Castle was used, though some prime ministers chose to live in Stormont House, the unused residence of the Speaker of the House of Commons of Northern Ireland.

The new offices of first minister and deputy first minister were created by the Good Friday Agreement of 1998. In contrast with the Westminster-style system of the earlier Stormont government, the new Northern Ireland Executive operates on the principles of consociational democracy.

In 1974, Brian Faulkner was chosen to lead the Northern Ireland Executive not as Prime Minister of Northern Ireland but as Chief Executive of Northern Ireland.

== List of officeholders ==
No.	Name (Birth–Death) Constituency	Portrait	Term of office		Elected (Parliament)	Ministry	Party	Last office(s) held before election
1.	Sir James Craig (created 1st Viscount Craigavon in 1927) (1871–1940); MP for Down until 1929; MP for North Down from 1929		7 June 1921	24 November 1940	1921 (1st)	Craigavon	Ulster Unionist Party	Parliamentary and Financial; Secretary to the Admiralty (1920–1921)
1.	Sir James Craig (created 1st Viscount Craigavon in 1927) (1871–1940); MP for Down until 1929; MP for North Down from 1929		7 June 1921	24 November 1940	1925 (2nd)	Craigavon	Ulster Unionist Party	Parliamentary and Financial; Secretary to the Admiralty (1920–1921)
1.	Sir James Craig (created 1st Viscount Craigavon in 1927) (1871–1940); MP for Down until 1929; MP for North Down from 1929		7 June 1921	24 November 1940	1929 (3rd)	Craigavon	Ulster Unionist Party	Parliamentary and Financial; Secretary to the Admiralty (1920–1921)
1.	Sir James Craig (created 1st Viscount Craigavon in 1927) (1871–1940); MP for Down until 1929; MP for North Down from 1929		7 June 1921	24 November 1940	1933 (4th)	Craigavon	Ulster Unionist Party	Parliamentary and Financial; Secretary to the Admiralty (1920–1921)
1.	Sir James Craig (created 1st Viscount Craigavon in 1927) (1871–1940); MP for Down until 1929; MP for North Down from 1929		7 June 1921	24 November 1940	1938 (5th)	Craigavon	Ulster Unionist Party	Parliamentary and Financial; Secretary to the Admiralty (1920–1921)
2.	John Miller Andrews (1871–1956); MP for Mid Down		27 November 1940	1 May 1943	— (5th)	Andrews	Ulster Unionist Party	Minister of Finance (1937–1941)
3.	Sir Basil Brooke (created The 1st Viscount Brookeborough in 1952) (1888–1973); MP for Lisnaskea		1 May 1943	26 March 1963	— (5th)	Brookeborough	Ulster Unionist Party	Minister of Commerce (1941–1943)
3.	Sir Basil Brooke (created The 1st Viscount Brookeborough in 1952) (1888–1973); MP for Lisnaskea		1 May 1943	26 March 1963	1945 (6th)	Brookeborough	Ulster Unionist Party	Minister of Commerce (1941–1943)
3.	Sir Basil Brooke (created The 1st Viscount Brookeborough in 1952) (1888–1973); MP for Lisnaskea		1 May 1943	26 March 1963	1949 (7th)	Brookeborough	Ulster Unionist Party	Minister of Commerce (1941–1943)
3.	Sir Basil Brooke (created The 1st Viscount Brookeborough in 1952) (1888–1973); MP for Lisnaskea		1 May 1943	26 March 1963	1953 (8th)	Brookeborough	Ulster Unionist Party	Minister of Commerce (1941–1943)
3.	Sir Basil Brooke (created The 1st Viscount Brookeborough in 1952) (1888–1973); MP for Lisnaskea		1 May 1943	26 March 1963	1958 (9th)	Brookeborough	Ulster Unionist Party	Minister of Commerce (1941–1943)
3.	Sir Basil Brooke (created The 1st Viscount Brookeborough in 1952) (1888–1973); MP for Lisnaskea		1 May 1943	26 March 1963	1962 (10th)	Brookeborough	Ulster Unionist Party	Minister of Commerce (1941–1943)
4.	Terence O'Neill (1914–1990); MP for Bannside		25 March 1963	1 May 1969	— (10th)	O'Neill	Ulster Unionist Party	Minister of Finance (1956–1963)
4.	Terence O'Neill (1914–1990); MP for Bannside		25 March 1963	1 May 1969	1965 (11th)	O'Neill	Ulster Unionist Party	Minister of Finance (1956–1963)
4.	Terence O'Neill (1914–1990); MP for Bannside		25 March 1963	1 May 1969	1969 (12th)	O'Neill	Ulster Unionist Party	Minister of Finance (1956–1963)
5.	James Chichester-Clark (1923–2002); MP for South Londonderry		1 May 1969	23 March 1971	— (12th)	Chichester-Clark	Ulster Unionist Party	Minister of Agriculture (1967–1969); Leader of the House of Commons (1968–1969)
6.	Brian Faulkner (1921–1977); MP for East Down		23 March 1971	30 March 1972	— (12th)	Faulkner	Ulster Unionist Party	Minister of Development (1969–1971)

== Parliamentary Secretary, Department of the Prime Minister ==
- 1921–1929 Algernon Skeffington, 12th Viscount Massereene
- 1929–1930 Maxwell Ward, 6th Viscount Bangor
- 1930–1941 Senator John Andrew Long
- 1941–1948 Sir Joseph Davison
- 1948–1960 Senator William Moore Wallis Clark
- 1960–1970 Senator Daniel McGladdery
- 1970–1972 Captain John Brooke, M.P.

== Additional Parliamentary Secretary, Department of the Prime Minister ==
- 1969 Bob Simpson

== Sources ==
- Alan J. Ward, The Irish Constitutional Tradition (Irish Academic Press, 1994)
- Government of Ireland Act, 1920
- The Government of Northern Ireland
