= List of members of the 1973 Northern Ireland Assembly =

This is a list of members of the Northern Ireland Assembly elected in 1973.

All members elected to the Northern Ireland Assembly at the 1973 election are listed and grouped by party.

== Members by party ==
This is a list of members elected in the 1973 Northern Ireland Assembly election, sorted by party.

Party	Name	Constituency
Ulster Unionist Party (31)	Norman Agnew	Belfast East
Ulster Unionist Party (31)	Austin Ardill	South Antrim
Ulster Unionist Party (31)	John Baxter	North Antrim
Ulster Unionist Party (31)	Roy Bradford	Belfast East
Ulster Unionist Party (31)	Ronald Broadhurst	South Down
Ulster Unionist Party (31)	John Brooke	North Down
Ulster Unionist Party (31)	William Brownlow	North Down
Ulster Unionist Party (31)	Robert Campbell	North Down
Ulster Unionist Party (31)	Joshua Cardwell	Belfast East
Ulster Unionist Party (31)	Sheena Conn	Londonderry
Ulster Unionist Party (31)	William Douglas	Londonderry
Ulster Unionist Party (31)	Nelson Elder	Belfast South
Ulster Unionist Party (31)	Brian Faulkner	South Down
Ulster Unionist Party (31)	Lloyd Hall-Thompson	Belfast North
Ulster Unionist Party (31)	Herbert Heslip	South Down
Ulster Unionist Party (31)	James Kilfedder	North Down
Ulster Unionist Party (31)	Herbert Kirk	Belfast South
Ulster Unionist Party (31)	John Laird *	Belfast West
Ulster Unionist Party (31)	Reginald Magee	Belfast South
Ulster Unionist Party (31)	Basil McIvor	Belfast South
Ulster Unionist Party (31)	Peter McLachlan	South Antrim
Ulster Unionist Party (31)	Frank Millar	Belfast North
Ulster Unionist Party (31)	Nat Minford	South Antrim
Ulster Unionist Party (31)	William Morgan	Belfast North
Ulster Unionist Party (31)	Leslie Morrell	Londonderry
Ulster Unionist Party (31)	Duncan Pollock	Mid Ulster
Ulster Unionist Party (31)	James Stronge	Armagh
Ulster Unionist Party (31)	John Taylor	North Down
Ulster Unionist Party (31)	William Thompson	Mid Ulster
Ulster Unionist Party (31)	Harry West	Fermanagh and South Tyrone
Ulster Unionist Party (31)	Herbert Whitten	Armagh
Social Democratic and Labour Party (19)	Michael Canavan	Londonderry
Social Democratic and Labour Party (19)	Ivan Cooper	Mid Ulster
Social Democratic and Labour Party (19)	Austin Currie	Fermanagh and South Tyrone
Social Democratic and Labour Party (19)	Thomas Daly	Fermanagh and South Tyrone
Social Democratic and Labour Party (19)	Paddy Devlin	Belfast West
Social Democratic and Labour Party (19)	Paddy Duffy	Mid Ulster
Social Democratic and Labour Party (19)	Frank Feely	South Down
Social Democratic and Labour Party (19)	Gerry Fitt	Belfast North
Social Democratic and Labour Party (19)	Desmond Gillespie	Belfast West
Social Democratic and Labour Party (19)	John Hume	Londonderry
Social Democratic and Labour Party (19)	Aidan Larkin	Mid Ulster
Social Democratic and Labour Party (19)	Hugh Logue	Londonderry
Social Democratic and Labour Party (19)	Seamus Mallon	Armagh
Social Democratic and Labour Party (19)	Vincent McCloskey	South Antrim
Social Democratic and Labour Party (19)	Eddie McGrady	South Down
Social Democratic and Labour Party (19)	Hugh News	Armagh
Social Democratic and Labour Party (19)	Patrick O'Donoghue	South Down
Social Democratic and Labour Party (19)	John O'Hagan	North Antrim
Social Democratic and Labour Party (19)	Paddy O'Hanlon	Armagh
Democratic Unionist Party (9)	William Beattie	South Antrim
Democratic Unionist Party (9)	Thomas Burns	Belfast South
Democratic Unionist Party (9)	James Craig	North Antrim
Democratic Unionist Party (9)	Douglas Hutchinson	Armagh
Democratic Unionist Party (9)	John McQuade	Belfast North
Democratic Unionist Party (9)	Eileen Paisley	Belfast East
Democratic Unionist Party (9)	Ian Paisley	North Antrim
Democratic Unionist Party (9)	Charles Poots	North Down
Democratic Unionist Party (9)	Clifford Smyth ♭	North Antrim
Vanguard Unionist Progressive Party (8)	Ernest Baird	Fermanagh and South Tyrone
Vanguard Unionist Progressive Party (8)	Glenn Barr	Londonderry
Vanguard Unionist Progressive Party (8)	Thomas Carson	Armagh
Vanguard Unionist Progressive Party (8)	Jean Coulter *	Belfast West
Vanguard Unionist Progressive Party (8)	William Craig	North Antrim
Vanguard Unionist Progressive Party (8)	John Dunlop	Mid Ulster
Vanguard Unionist Progressive Party (8)	Cecil Harvey	South Down
Vanguard Unionist Progressive Party (8)	Kennedy Lindsay	South Antrim
Alliance Party of Northern Ireland (8)	Bob Cooper	Belfast West
Alliance Party of Northern Ireland (8)	Derrick Crothers	South Antrim
Alliance Party of Northern Ireland (8)	John Ferguson	Belfast North
Alliance Party of Northern Ireland (8)	Basil Glass	Belfast South
Alliance Party of Northern Ireland (8)	Bertie McConnell	North Down
Alliance Party of Northern Ireland (8)	Charles Mulholland	North Down
Alliance Party of Northern Ireland (8)	Oliver Napier	Belfast East
Alliance Party of Northern Ireland (8)	Hugh Wilson	North Antrim
Northern Ireland Labour Party (1)	David Bleakley	Belfast East
Independent Unionist (2)	Anne Dickson	South Antrim
Independent Unionist (2)	Hugh Smyth *	Belfast West

- John Laird, Hugh Smyth and Jean Coulter used the label "West Belfast Loyalist Coalition" simultaneously whilst standing under different party affiliations.

== Members by constituency ==
The list is given in alphabetical order by constituency.

Members of the Northern Ireland Forum
Constituency	Name	Party
Armagh	Thomas Carson	Vanguard Unionist Progressive Party
Armagh	Douglas Hutchinson	Democratic Unionist Party
Armagh	Seamus Mallon	Social Democratic and Labour Party
Armagh	Hugh News	Social Democratic and Labour Party
Armagh	Paddy O'Hanlon	Social Democratic and Labour Party
Armagh	James Stronge	Ulster Unionist Party
Armagh	Herbert Whitten	Ulster Unionist Party
Belfast East	Norman Agnew	Ulster Unionist Party
Belfast East	David Bleakley	Northern Ireland Labour Party
Belfast East	Roy Bradford	Ulster Unionist Party
Belfast East	Joshua Cardwell	Ulster Unionist Party
Belfast East	Oliver Napier	Alliance Party of Northern Ireland
Belfast East	Eileen Paisley	Democratic Unionist Party
Belfast North	John Ferguson	Alliance Party of Northern Ireland
Belfast North	Gerry Fitt	Social Democratic and Labour Party
Belfast North	Lloyd Hall-Thompson	Ulster Unionist Party
Belfast North	John McQuade	Democratic Unionist Party
Belfast North	Frank Millar	Ulster Unionist Party
Belfast North	William Morgan	Ulster Unionist Party
Belfast South	Thomas Burns	Democratic Unionist Party
Belfast South	Nelson Elder	Ulster Unionist Party
Belfast South	Basil Glass	Alliance Party of Northern Ireland
Belfast South	Herbert Kirk	Ulster Unionist Party
Belfast South	Reginald Magee	Ulster Unionist Party
Belfast South	Basil McIvor	Ulster Unionist Party
Belfast West	Bob Cooper	Alliance Party of Northern Ireland
Belfast West	Jean Coulter *	Vanguard Unionist Progressive Party
Belfast West	Paddy Devlin	Social Democratic and Labour Party
Belfast West	Desmond Gillespie	Social Democratic and Labour Party
Belfast West	John Laird *	Ulster Unionist Party
Belfast West	Hugh Smyth *	Independent Unionist
Fermanagh and South Tyrone	Ernest Baird	Vanguard Unionist Progressive Party
Fermanagh and South Tyrone	Austin Currie	Social Democratic and Labour Party
Fermanagh and South Tyrone	Thomas Daly	Social Democratic and Labour Party
Fermanagh and South Tyrone	John Taylor	Ulster Unionist Party
Fermanagh and South Tyrone	Harry West	Ulster Unionist Party
Londonderry	Michael Canavan	Social Democratic and Labour Party
Londonderry	Sheena Conn	Ulster Unionist Party
Londonderry	Glenn Barr	Vanguard Unionist Progressive Party
Londonderry	William Douglas	Ulster Unionist Party
Londonderry	John Hume	Social Democratic and Labour Party
Londonderry	Hugh Logue	Social Democratic and Labour Party
Londonderry	Leslie Morrell	Ulster Unionist Party
Mid Ulster	Ivan Cooper	Social Democratic and Labour Party
Mid Ulster	John Dunlop	Vanguard Unionist Progressive Party
Mid Ulster	Paddy Duffy	Social Democratic and Labour Party
Mid Ulster	Aidan Larkin	Social Democratic and Labour Party
Mid Ulster	Duncan Pollock	Ulster Unionist Party
Mid Ulster	William Thompson	Ulster Unionist Party
North Antrim	John Baxter	Ulster Unionist Party
North Antrim	James Craig	Democratic Unionist Party
North Antrim	William Craig	Vanguard Unionist Progressive Party
North Antrim	John O'Hagan	Social Democratic and Labour Party
North Antrim	Ian Paisley	Democratic Unionist Party
North Antrim	Clifford Smyth ♭	Democratic Unionist Party
North Antrim	Hugh Wilson	Alliance Party of Northern Ireland
North Down	John Brooke	Ulster Unionist Party
North Down	William Brownlow	Ulster Unionist Party
North Down	Robert Campbell	Ulster Unionist Party
North Down	James Kilfedder	Ulster Unionist Party
North Down	Bertie McConnell	Alliance Party of Northern Ireland
North Down	Charles Mulholland	Alliance Party of Northern Ireland
North Down	Charles Poots	Democratic Unionist Party
South Antrim	Austin Ardill	Ulster Unionist Party
South Antrim	William Beattie	Democratic Unionist Party
South Antrim	Anne Dickson	Independent Unionist
South Antrim	Charles Kinahan	Alliance Party of Northern Ireland
South Antrim	Kennedy Lindsay	Vanguard Unionist Progressive Party
South Antrim	Vincent McCloskey	Social Democratic and Labour Party
South Antrim	Peter McLachlan	Ulster Unionist Party
South Antrim	Nat Minford	Ulster Unionist Party
South Down	Ronald Broadhurst	Ulster Unionist Party
South Down	Brian Faulkner	Ulster Unionist Party
South Down	Frank Feely	Social Democratic and Labour Party
South Down	Cecil Harvey	Vanguard Unionist Progressive Party
South Down	Herbert Heslip	Ulster Unionist Party
South Down	Eddie McGrady	Social Democratic and Labour Party
South Down	Patrick O'Donoghue	Social Democratic and Labour Party

- John Laird, Hugh Smyth and Jean Coulter used the label "West Belfast Loyalist Coalition" simultaneously whilst standing under different party affiliations.

== Changes ==
=== By-Elections ===
Date	Constituency	Outgoing Member	Party	New Member	Party	Reason
20 June 1974	North Antrim	David McCarthy	UUP	Clifford Smyth	DUP	David McCarthy died.

== Representation of women ==
Of all the candidates, the four women were: Sheena Conn, Jean Coulter, Anne Dickson, Eileen Paisley.
