= List of members of the Northern Ireland Constitutional Convention =

This is a list of members of the Northern Ireland Constitutional Convention, which was elected in 1975.

All members elected to the Northern Ireland Constitutional Convention are listed. Members are grouped by party.

== Members by party ==
This is a list of members elected to the Northern Ireland Constitutional Convention, sorted by party.

Party	Name	Constituency
Ulster Unionist Party (19)	Austin Ardill	South Antrim
Ulster Unionist Party (19)	Michael Armstrong	Armagh
Ulster Unionist Party (19)	Billy Bell	Belfast North
Ulster Unionist Party (19)	Peter Brush	South Down
Ulster Unionist Party (19)	Jeremy Burchill	Belfast South
Ulster Unionist Party (19)	Sheena Conn	Londonderry
Ulster Unionist Party (19)	Jean Coulter	Belfast West
Ulster Unionist Party (19)	William Douglas	Londonderry
Ulster Unionist Party (19)	Herbert Heslip	South Down
Ulster Unionist Party (19)	James Kilfedder	North Down
Ulster Unionist Party (19)	John Laird	Belfast West
Ulster Unionist Party (19)	John McKay	Fermanagh and South Tyrone
Ulster Unionist Party (19)	William Morgan	Belfast North
Ulster Unionist Party (19)	Martin Smyth	Belfast South
Ulster Unionist Party (19)	John Taylor	North Down
Ulster Unionist Party (19)	Francis Thompson	Mid Ulster
Ulster Unionist Party (19)	William Thompson	Mid Ulster
Ulster Unionist Party (19)	Harry West	Fermanagh and South Tyrone
Ulster Unionist Party (19)	Herbert Whitten	Armagh
Social Democratic and Labour Party (17)	Michael Canavan	Londonderry
Social Democratic and Labour Party (17)	Ivan Cooper	Mid Ulster
Social Democratic and Labour Party (17)	Austin Currie	Fermanagh and South Tyrone
Social Democratic and Labour Party (17)	Thomas Daly	Fermanagh and South Tyrone
Social Democratic and Labour Party (17)	Paddy Devlin	Belfast West
Social Democratic and Labour Party (17)	Paddy Duffy	Mid Ulster
Social Democratic and Labour Party (17)	Frank Feely	South Down
Social Democratic and Labour Party (17)	Gerry Fitt	Belfast North
Social Democratic and Labour Party (17)	Joe Hendron	Belfast West
Social Democratic and Labour Party (17)	John Hume	Londonderry
Social Democratic and Labour Party (17)	Hugh Logue	Londonderry
Social Democratic and Labour Party (17)	Seamus Mallon	Armagh
Social Democratic and Labour Party (17)	Vincent McCloskey	South Antrim
Social Democratic and Labour Party (17)	Eddie McGrady	South Down
Social Democratic and Labour Party (17)	Hugh News	Armagh
Social Democratic and Labour Party (17)	Patrick O'Donoghue	South Down
Social Democratic and Labour Party (17)	John Turnley	North Antrim
Vanguard Unionist Progressive Party (14)	David Allen	North Antrim
Vanguard Unionist Progressive Party (14)	Ernest Baird	Fermanagh and South Tyrone
Vanguard Unionist Progressive Party (14)	Glenn Barr	Londonderry
Vanguard Unionist Progressive Party (14)	Alistair Black	Armagh
Vanguard Unionist Progressive Party (14)	Thomas Carson	Armagh
Vanguard Unionist Progressive Party (14)	William Craig	Belfast East
Vanguard Unionist Progressive Party (14)	Reg Empey	Belfast East
Vanguard Unionist Progressive Party (14)	George Green	North Down
Vanguard Unionist Progressive Party (14)	Cecil Harvey	South Down
Vanguard Unionist Progressive Party (14)	Kennedy Lindsay	South Antrim
Vanguard Unionist Progressive Party (14)	George Morrison	South Antrim
Vanguard Unionist Progressive Party (14)	Robert Overend	Mid Ulster
Vanguard Unionist Progressive Party (14)	David Trimble	Belfast South
Vanguard Unionist Progressive Party (14)	William Wright	North Antrim
Democratic Unionist Party (12)	William Annon	Belfast North
Democratic Unionist Party (12)	William Beattie	South Antrim
Democratic Unionist Party (12)	Thomas Burns	Belfast South
Democratic Unionist Party (12)	Stewart Dunlop	South Antrim
Democratic Unionist Party (12)	Douglas Hutchinson	Armagh
Democratic Unionist Party (12)	James McClure	Londonderry
Democratic Unionist Party (12)	Ken McFaul	North Antrim
Democratic Unionist Party (12)	Eileen Paisley	Belfast East
Democratic Unionist Party (12)	Ian Paisley	North Antrim
Democratic Unionist Party (12)	Charles Poots	North Down
Democratic Unionist Party (12)	Richard Reid	Mid Ulster
Democratic Unionist Party (12)	Clifford Smyth	North Antrim
Alliance Party of Northern Ireland (8)	Bob Cooper	Belfast West
Alliance Party of Northern Ireland (8)	Basil Glass	Belfast South
Alliance Party of Northern Ireland (8)	Jim Hendron	Belfast South
Alliance Party of Northern Ireland (8)	Charles Kinahan	South Antrim
Alliance Party of Northern Ireland (8)	Bertie McConnell	North Down
Alliance Party of Northern Ireland (8)	Charles Mulholland	North Down
Alliance Party of Northern Ireland (8)	Oliver Napier	Belfast East
Alliance Party of Northern Ireland (8)	Hugh Wilson	North Antrim
Unionist Party of Northern Ireland (5)	John Brooke	North Down
Unionist Party of Northern Ireland (5)	Joshua Cardwell	Belfast East
Unionist Party of Northern Ireland (5)	Anne Dickson	South Antrim
Unionist Party of Northern Ireland (5)	Brian Faulkner	South Down
Unionist Party of Northern Ireland (5)	Lloyd Hall-Thompson	Belfast North
Northern Ireland Labour Party (1)	David Bleakley	Belfast East
Independent Unionist (2)	Frank Millar	Belfast North
Independent Unionist (2)	Hugh Smyth	Belfast West

== Members by constituency ==
The list is given in alphabetical order by constituency.

Members of the Northern Ireland Forum
Constituency	Name	Party
Armagh	Michael Armstrong	Ulster Unionist Party
Armagh	Alistair Black	Vanguard Unionist Progressive Party
Armagh	Thomas Carson	Vanguard Unionist Progressive Party
Armagh	Douglas Hutchinson	Democratic Unionist Party
Armagh	Seamus Mallon	Social Democratic and Labour Party
Armagh	Hugh News	Social Democratic and Labour Party
Armagh	Herbert Whitten	Ulster Unionist Party
Belfast East	David Bleakley	Northern Ireland Labour Party
Belfast East	Joshua Cardwell	Unionist Party of Northern Ireland
Belfast East	William Craig	Vanguard Unionist Progressive Party
Belfast East	Reg Empey	Vanguard Unionist Progressive Party
Belfast East	Oliver Napier	Alliance Party of Northern Ireland
Belfast East	Eileen Paisley	Democratic Unionist Party
Belfast North	William Annon	Democratic Unionist Party
Belfast North	Billy Bell	Ulster Unionist Party
Belfast North	Gerry Fitt	Social Democratic and Labour Party
Belfast North	Lloyd Hall-Thompson	Unionist Party of Northern Ireland
Belfast North	Frank Millar	Independent Unionist
Belfast North	William Morgan	Ulster Unionist Party
Belfast South	Jeremy Burchill	Ulster Unionist Party
Belfast South	Thomas Burns	Democratic Unionist Party
Belfast South	Basil Glass	Alliance Party of Northern Ireland
Belfast South	Jim Hendron	Alliance Party of Northern Ireland
Belfast South	Martin Smyth	Ulster Unionist Party
Belfast South	David Trimble	Vanguard Unionist Progressive Party
Belfast West	Bob Cooper	Alliance Party of Northern Ireland
Belfast West	Jean Coulter	Ulster Unionist Party
Belfast West	Paddy Devlin	Social Democratic and Labour Party
Belfast West	Joe Hendron	Social Democratic and Labour Party
Belfast West	John Laird	Ulster Unionist Party
Belfast West	Hugh Smyth	Independent Unionist
Fermanagh and South Tyrone	Ernest Baird	Vanguard Unionist Progressive Party
Fermanagh and South Tyrone	Austin Currie	Social Democratic and Labour Party
Fermanagh and South Tyrone	Thomas Daly	Social Democratic and Labour Party
Fermanagh and South Tyrone	John McKay	Ulster Unionist Party
Fermanagh and South Tyrone	Harry West	Ulster Unionist Party
Londonderry	Michael Canavan	Social Democratic and Labour Party
Londonderry	Sheena Conn	Ulster Unionist Party
Londonderry	Glenn Barr	Vanguard Unionist Progressive Party
Londonderry	William Douglas	Ulster Unionist Party
Londonderry	John Hume	Social Democratic and Labour Party
Londonderry	Hugh Logue	Social Democratic and Labour Party
Londonderry	James McClure	Democratic Unionist Party
Mid Ulster	Ivan Cooper	Social Democratic and Labour Party
Mid Ulster	Paddy Duffy	Social Democratic and Labour Party
Mid Ulster	Robert Overend	Vanguard Unionist Progressive Party
Mid Ulster	Richard Reid	Democratic Unionist Party
Mid Ulster	Francis Thompson	Ulster Unionist Party
Mid Ulster	William Thompson	Ulster Unionist Party
North Antrim	David Allen	Vanguard Unionist Progressive Party
North Antrim	Ken McFaul	Democratic Unionist Party
North Antrim	Ian Paisley	Democratic Unionist Party
North Antrim	Clifford Smyth	Democratic Unionist Party
North Antrim	John Turnley	Social Democratic and Labour Party
North Antrim	Hugh Wilson	Alliance Party of Northern Ireland
North Antrim	William Wright	Vanguard Unionist Progressive Party
North Down	John Brooke	Unionist Party of Northern Ireland
North Down	George Green	Vanguard Unionist Progressive Party
North Down	James Kilfedder	Ulster Unionist Party
North Down	Bertie McConnell	Alliance Party of Northern Ireland
North Down	Charles Mulholland	Alliance Party of Northern Ireland
North Down	Charles Poots	Democratic Unionist Party
North Down	John Taylor	Ulster Unionist Party
South Antrim	Austin Ardill	Ulster Unionist Party
South Antrim	William Beattie	Democratic Unionist Party
South Antrim	Anne Dickson	Unionist Party of Northern Ireland
South Antrim	Stewart Dunlop	Democratic Unionist Party
South Antrim	Charles Kinahan	Alliance Party of Northern Ireland
South Antrim	Kennedy Lindsay	Vanguard Unionist Progressive Party
South Antrim	George Morrison	Vanguard Unionist Progressive Party
South Antrim	Vincent McCloskey	Social Democratic and Labour Party
South Down	Peter Brush	Ulster Unionist Party
South Down	Brian Faulkner	Unionist Party of Northern Ireland
South Down	Frank Feely	Social Democratic and Labour Party
South Down	Cecil Harvey	Vanguard Unionist Progressive Party
South Down	Herbert Heslip	Ulster Unionist Party
South Down	Eddie McGrady	Social Democratic and Labour Party
South Down	Patrick O'Donoghue	Social Democratic and Labour Party

== Representation by women ==
Of all the members, the four women were: Sheena Conn, Jean Coulter, Anne Dickson, Eileen Paisley.
