= John O'Hagan (politician) =

Northern Irish politician

Member of the Northern Ireland Assembly for North Antrim
- In office 28 June 1973 – May 1974
- Preceded by: Assembly created
- Succeeded by: Assembly abolished

Personal details
- Born: March 1936 (age 90) Ballymena, Northern Ireland
- Party: Social Democratic and Labour

John J. O'Hagan (born March 1936) was an Irish nationalist politician and business owner.

== Background ==
Born in Ballymena, O'Hagan studied at Ballymena Technical College before becoming an accountant, soon founding J. J. O'Hagan and Company. He stood at the 1973 Northern Ireland local elections for Ballymena Borough Council as an independent, but was not elected. After the election, he joined the Social Democratic and Labour Party (SDLP), and was immediately adopted as one of their candidates for North Antrim at the 1973 Northern Ireland Assembly election, even though the election was a mere six weeks later. He was successful, becoming the only nationalist representative for the seat. However, he did not stand for the Northern Ireland Constitutional Convention in 1975, instead leaving politics.

Northern Ireland Assembly (1973)
New assembly	Assembly Member for North Antrim; 1973–1974	Assembly abolished
