= Kennedy Lindsay =

Northern Irish politician

Professor Kennedy Lindsay
- Born: 1924; Saskatchewan, Canada
- Died: 1997 (aged 72–73)
- Education: PhD in Modern History
- Alma mater: Trinity College Dublin; Edinburgh University
- Occupation: Academic
- Employer: University of Ulster
- Notable work: Dominion of Ulster; Ambush at Tullywest; The British Intelligence Services in Action
- Title: Member of the Northern Ireland Assembly
- Term: 1973–1974
- Political party: Vanguard Progressive Unionist Party; British Ulster Dominion Party; United Ulster Unionist Party; British Ulster Unionist Party
- Movement: Ulster Vanguard

Kennedy Lindsay (1924–1997) was a Northern Ireland politician and a leading advocate of Ulster nationalism. Born in Canada but raised in Northern Ireland, Lindsay pursued a career as a history academic before becoming associated with the Ulster Vanguard tendency of unionism. He took a leading role in the tendency within the Vanguard that supported a diminished role for the United Kingdom in Northern Ireland and produced the Dominion of Ulster, outlining his views, in 1972.

Lindsay subsequently led two political parties advocating his dominion idea but failed to gain much support. He largely left active politics in his later life to concentrate on writing.

== Academic career ==
Born in Saskatchewan, Canada, of Ulster Scots descent, Lindsay was raised on a farm in Northern Ireland after his family emigrated. He was educated at Trinity College Dublin, Edinburgh University and in London, gaining a PhD in modern history, studying under Richard Pares and Sir Lewis Namier. His academic career saw Lindsay lecture and research in North America and Nigeria and he spent a number of years at the Royal Military College of Canada in Canada, where he also worked for the Canadian International Development Agency and the Canadian Department of External Affairs. He eventually returned to Northern Ireland and lectured in the School of Humanities at the University of Ulster in Coleraine, County Londonderry.

== Politics ==
Lindsay entered politics as a member of the Vanguard Progressive Unionist Party and was elected to the Northern Ireland Assembly set up under the 1973 Sunningdale Agreement to represent that party in the South Antrim constituency. He retained the seat for the Vanguard in the 1975 Northern Ireland Constitutional Convention election under the United Ulster Unionist Council banner.

His Eight Point Ulster Plan, produced for the Loyalist Association of Workers, had garnered him much attention and he soon rose to become one of the most prominent members of the Vanguard. The document argued that the sole task for the future must be to destroy the Irish Republican Army and that the British government must commit to governing Northern Ireland in the same way as the rest of the United Kingdom. It continued that the government must fully identify itself as being with the Ulster people and abandon any notions of being simply a neutral arbiter, with the security forces strengthened for the proposed war on the IRA. To accommodate this strengthening, more local personnel were to be recruited to the Royal Ulster Constabulary and Ulster Defence Regiment, with the Ulster Defence Association incorporated into the security forces and the British Army and the police given vastly improved weapons and techniques. Finally, the document argued that the government of the Republic of Ireland had been harbouring IRA members and that the British government must induce them to stop.

Deeply opposed to the Assembly, Lindsay had also grown disillusioned with unionism, and began to call for implementation of the ideas of W. F. McCoy, who had earlier called for Northern Ireland to be granted Dominion status. He felt that his plan, which he had intended to strengthen the Union, had been ignored and so moved to a more formal separation for Northern Ireland. In 1972 he published a paper, Dominion of Ulster, in which he likened Irish Nationalists to the pre-Second World War Sudeten Germans and described the late Stormont era as Ulster's "Vichy period".

Lindsay underlined this newfound commitment when, in 1975, he set up the Ulster Dominion Group, which would emerge as the British Ulster Dominion Party in 1977. The party contested local elections without success and also produced a newspaper, The Ulsterman, which enjoyed wider circulation than the party had support. Lindsay himself failed to secure election to Newtownabbey Borough Council in 1977, finishing bottom of the poll in electoral area A.

== Later years ==
Lindsay withdrew from politics after his new party failed to make any headway. He then turned his attention to writing books about the British secret service operations in Northern Ireland, including Ambush at Tullywest and The British Intelligence Services in Action. The former would later be quoted by Sinn Féin MLA Mary Nelis in a Northern Ireland Assembly debate on security forces collusion in Northern Ireland. Lindsay briefly returned in 1982 to stand in an Assembly election in South Antrim as a candidate for the United Ulster Unionist Party; he and his running mate Samuel Larmour came bottom of the poll.

In 1996 Lindsay made an even briefer return when he formed the "British Ulster Unionist Party" with the intention of standing in elections to the Northern Ireland Forum, but in the event the party did not run any candidates.

Northern Ireland Assembly (1973)
New assembly	Assembly Member for South Antrim; 1973–1974	Assembly abolished
Northern Ireland Constitutional Convention
New convention	Member for South Antrim; 1975–1976	Convention dissolved
