= Irish Council =

Irish Council may refer to:

- Irish Privy Council, formal executive of Ireland before 1922
- Irish Council Bill, 1907 proposal for an Irish Council with administrative powers

== See also ==
- Council of Ireland (disambiguation)
- Irish Society (disambiguation)
- Local government in Ireland (disambiguation), most local authorities are governed by councils.
