= Thomas Carson (politician) =

Northern Irish unionist politician

Member of the Constitutional Convention for Armagh
- In office 1975–1976

Member of the Northern Ireland Assembly for Armagh
- In office 1973–1974

Personal details
- Born: March 1911 Ballybay, County Monaghan, Ireland
- Party: Ulster Vanguard (from 1973)
- Other political affiliations: Ulster Unionist Party (before 1973)

Thomas D. Carson (born March 1911) was a Northern Irish unionist politician.

== Background ==
Born in Ballybay in County Monaghan, Carson studied at Clones High School, Campbell College and Queen's University Belfast. He worked as a medical doctor before retiring in the early 1970s. In retirement, he became politically active, as vice-chairman of the South Armagh Unionist Association in 1971/2, and then President in 1972/3.

In 1973, Carson resigned from the Ulster Unionist Party to join the Vanguard Unionist Progressive Party, and immediately elected in the 1973 Northern Ireland Assembly election for Armagh. Following his election, he joined the Armagh County Executive of Vanguard, and also became a member of the Monday Club and the Commonwealth Parliamentary Association.

Carson held his Armagh seat on the Northern Ireland Constitutional Convention in 1975. Outside politics, he spent his time gardening and birdwatching.

Northern Ireland Assembly (1973)
New assembly	Assembly Member for Armagh; 1973–1974	Assembly abolished
Northern Ireland Constitutional Convention
New convention	Member for Armagh; 1975–1976	Convention dissolved
