= Ernest Baird =

Leader of the United Ulster Unionist Party
- In office 1975 – May 1984
- Deputy: Reg Empey
- Preceded by: Office created
- Succeeded by: Office abolished

Deputy leader of the Vanguard Unionist Progressive Party
- In office 1973–1975
- Leader: William Craig

Member of the Northern Ireland Constitutional Convention for Fermanagh and South Tyrone
- In office 1975–1976

Member of the Northern Ireland Assembly for Fermanagh and South Tyrone
- In office 1973–1974

Personal details
- Born: 1930 County Donegal, Ireland
- Died: September 2003 (aged 72–73)
- Party: United Ulster Unionist Party (1975 - 1984)
- Other political affiliations: Ulster Vanguard (before 1975)

Ernest Baird (1930 – September 2003) was a Northern Irish pharmacist and unionist politician.

== Background ==
=== Early life ===
Baird was born in County Donegal in the Irish Free State but moved with his family to Belfast at an early age.

=== Career ===
A pharmacist and political unionist, Baird became the deputy leader of the Vanguard Progressive Unionist Party. He was elected at the 1973 Northern Ireland Assembly election for Fermanagh and South Tyrone, and won a seat in the same constituency on the Northern Ireland Constitutional Convention.

When William Craig, the leader of Vanguard, proposed forming a coalition government with the nationalist Social Democratic and Labour Party, Baird led the majority of Vanguard in leaving to form the United Ulster Unionist Movement.

Baird became the leader of the new grouping, which initially pursued a policy of uniting all unionist groups to form a new party. When this proved impossible, it instead constituted itself as the United Ulster Unionist Party (UUUP), again with Baird as the leader. He then became a key member of the United Unionist Action Council

Baird stood for the UUUP in Fermanagh and South Tyrone at the 1979 general election, but won only 17% of the vote, taking fourth position in the poll. At the 1982 Northern Ireland Assembly election, he fared even less well, taking only 2,022 first preference votes.

Sometime after this poor performance, the UUUP was dissolved. Baird then confined his politics to the Orange Order, while building up his "Baird's Chemists" chain that became one of Northern Ireland's leading chemist chains, before being bought over in 2011.

== Bibliography ==
- Fermanagh and South Tyrone 1973-1982
- CAIN Web Service: Abstracts on Organisations - 'U'
- "Veteran unionist Baird dies after long illness", Belfast Telegraph

Northern Ireland Assembly (1973)
New assembly	Assembly Member for Fermanagh & South Tyrone; 1973–1974	Assembly abolished
Northern Ireland Constitutional Convention
New convention	Member for Fermanagh & South Tyrone; 1975–1976	Convention dissolved
Political offices
Preceded by Austin Ardill; Martin Smyth	Deputy Leader of the Vanguard Progressive Unionist Party; 1973–1975; With: Lindsay Smyth	Succeeded by Glenn Barr; David Trimble
New political party	Leader of the United Ulster Unionist Party; 1975–1982	Position abolished
