= Jean Coulter =

Member of the Northern Ireland Constitutional Convention for Belfast West
- In office 1975–1976

Member of the Northern Ireland Assembly for Belfast West
- In office 1973–1975

Personal details
- Born: Shankill, Belfast, Northern Ireland
- Party: UUP
- Other political affiliations: Vanguard Unionist (1973-1975)

Rose Jean Coulter is a former Northern Irish unionist politician.

== Background ==
Born in the Shankill Road district of Belfast, Coulter studied at the Girls' Model School before becoming a solicitor's clerk. She also became active in the Ulster Unionist Party (UUP). In June 1973, she worked with John Laird and Hugh Smyth to form the West Belfast Loyalist Coalition, which contested the 1973 Northern Ireland Assembly election. All three were elected from the Belfast West constituency. In Coulter's case, she was co-sponsored by the Vanguard Progressive Unionist Party.

In January 1974, Brian Faulkner resigned as leader of the UUP, and Coulter switched her affiliation back to that party, allowing the West Belfast Loyalist Coalition to become inactive. In 1975, she was elected to the Northern Ireland Constitutional Convention as a UUP member. Although she did not stand for election again, she remained politically active, calling for the Royal Air Force to bomb Irish republican areas of Northern Ireland, claiming that there were no "innocent people" there. She opposed the Belfast Agreement, and by the 2005 UK general election, was a supporter of the Democratic Unionist Party.

Northern Ireland Assembly (1973)
New assembly	Assembly Member for West Belfast; 1973–1974	Assembly abolished
Northern Ireland Constitutional Convention
New convention	Member for West Belfast; 1975–1976	Convention dissolved
