= Clifford Smyth =

Northern Irish historian and politician

Member of the Northern Ireland Constitutional Convention for North Antrim
- In office 1975–1976

Member of the Northern Ireland Assembly for North Antrim
- In office July 1973 – 1974

Personal details
- Born: 1944 (age 81–82) County Antrim, Northern Ireland
- Party: Ulster Unionist (from 1979)
- Other political affiliations: DUP (until 1976)

Clifford Smyth (born 1944) is a Northern Irish historian and former unionist politician.

== Background ==
Smyth stood for the Democratic Unionist Party (DUP) in North Antrim in the 1973 Northern Ireland Assembly election, narrowly missing out on a seat. Following the death of David McCarthy, an Ulster Unionist Party (UUP) MPA, he easily won a by-election for a seat on the Assembly. He also became the secretary of the United Ulster Unionist Council.

Smyth was elected to the Northern Ireland Constitutional Convention, again in North Antrim, in 1975. He was expelled from the DUP, however, in 1976, after he was accused of passing information to the then Secretary of State Merlyn Rees' office. He joined the Ulster Unionist Party (UUP) and stood unsuccessfully as its candidate for the Westminster seat of North Down at the 1979 general election.

From the 1980s onwards, Smyth turned increasingly to history and the Orange Order. He wrote a critical biography of Ian Paisley, Ian Paisley: Voice of Protestant Ulster. He was also a leading member of the Campaign for Equal Citizenship, which was founded in 1986, and campaigned for the three main British political parties to fully organise in Northern Ireland.

Smyth was also a history teacher at Knockbreda High School in Belfast for many years, and is also regarded as an expert on the Orange Order and its lodges. During the 1990s, Smyth resigned from the Orange Order. In 2005, he revealed that he had transvestite compulsions.

He criticised Ian Paisley and the DUP's decision to share power with Sinn Féin and claimed the DUP would lose a lot of voters because of this.

In 2011 it was revealed the BBC decided to drop him from its yearly live coverage of the twelfth of July parades in Belfast. Smyth who commentated on the programme for over 10 years was quoted as being 'sad' after being informed.

Northern Ireland Assembly (1973)
| Preceded by David McCarthy | Assembly Member for North Antrim; 1973–1974 | Assembly abolished |
Northern Ireland Constitutional Convention
| New convention | Member for North Antrim; 1975–1976 | Convention dissolved |
