= Hugh Logue =

Northern Irish economist and politician

- Born: Hugh Anthony Logue; 23 January 1949 (age 77); Derry, Northern Ireland
- Education: Trinity College Dublin
- Occupations: Economist and Political Commentator
- Spouse: Anne Logue
- Children: 3 (including Antonia)

Hugh Anthony Logue (born 23 January 1949) is a Northern Irish former Social Democratic and Labour Party politician and economist who now works as a commentator on political and economic issues. He is also a director of two renewable energy companies in Europe and the United States. He is the father of author Antonia Logue.

== Background ==
Logue grew up outside the village of Claudy in County Londonderry, the eldest of nine children born to Denis and Kathleen Logue ( née Devine).Denis Logue was a bricklayer. Hugh Logue gained a scholarship to St Columbs College which he attended from 1961 to 1967 .In 1967 he commenced at St Josephs Teacher Training college (Queens University) in Belfast from which he qualified as a teacher of Mathematics in 1970. Logue first came to prominence as a member of the executive of the Northern Ireland Civil Rights Association – the only SDLP member of the executive. He stood as a candidate in elections to the new Northern Ireland Assembly in 1973 and was elected for Londonderry, aged 24, the youngest candidate elected that year. With John Hume and Ivan Cooper, Hugh Logue was arrested by the British Army during a peaceful demonstration in Londonderry in August 1971. Their conviction was ultimately overturned by the Law Lords R. (Hume) v Londonderry Justices (972, N.I.91) requiring the then British Government to introduce retrospective legislation to render legal previous British Army actions in Northern Ireland.

The Northern Ireland State Papers of 1980 show that together with John Hume and Austin Currie he played a key role in presenting the SDLP'S 'Three Strands' approach to the Thatcher Government's Secretary of State Humphrey Atkins in April 1980 (Irish Times, 30 December 2010). The "Three Strands" approach eventually became the basis for the Good Friday Agreement. The Irish State papers from 1980 reveal that Logue was a confidante of the Irish Government of that time briefing it regularly on the SDLP's outlook.

He is also known for his controversial comments at Trinity College Dublin at the time of the power-sharing Sunningdale Agreement, which many blame for helping to contribute to the Agreement's defeat, to wit, that: [Sunningdale was] "the vehicle that would trundle Unionists into a united Ireland". The next line of the controversial speech, said 'the speed the vehicle moved at was dependent on the Unionist community.' In an article in The Irish Times in 1997 Logue claimed that this implied that unity was always based on consent and acknowledged by Unionist Spokesman John Laird in the NI Assembly in 1973.

Logue unsuccessfully contested the Londonderry seat in the February 1974 and 1979 Westminster Elections. He was elected to the 1975 constitutional convention and the 1982 Assembly. He was a member of the New Ireland Forum in 1983. In the 1980s he was a member of the Irish Commission for Justice and Peace, and played a prominent part in its efforts to resolve the 1981 Irish hunger strike. His role was credited in Ten Men Dead by David Beresford, Biting the Grave by P. O'Malley and, more recently, in Blanketmen and Afterlives by former Provisional Irish Republican Army volunteer Richard O'Rawe. Following the New Ireland Forum in 1984 and John Hume's decision to represent the redrawn Londonderry constituency as Foyle and a safe seat, Logue left the Dublin-based, National Board for Science and Technology and joined the European Commission in 1984 in Brussels.

Following the 1994 IRA ceasefire, Logue, along with two EU colleagues, was asked by EU President Jacques Delors to consult widely throughout Northern Ireland and the Border regions and prepare recommendations for a Peace and Reconciliation Fund to underpin the peace process. Their community based approach became the blue print for the Peace Programme. In 1997, then EU President Jacques Santer asked the team, led by Logue to return to review the programme and advise for a renewed Peace ll programme. Future programme of Peace III and Peace IV. Papers published by National University Galway in 2016 from Logue's archives indicate that Logue was the originator of the Peace Fund concept within the European Commission.

At the European Commission from 1984 to 1998, Logue developed a strong policy like between Eu Regional policy and Eu Research Policy, creating STRIDE (Science and Technology for Regional Innovation and Development in Europe). In 1992 he was joint author with Giovanni de Gaetano, of 'RTD potential in the Mezzogiorno of Italy: the role of science parks in a European perspective' (ISBN 92-827-7965-3) and with A. Zabaniotou and University of Thessaloniki, 'Structural Support For RTD'.

Further publications by Logue followed in 1996, 'Research and Rural Regions' (ISBN 92-827-5299-2), and in 1997 'RTD potential in the Objective 1 regions' (ISBN 92-827-9705-8) was published. With the fall of the Berlin Wall, Logue's attention turned to Eastern Europe and in March 1998 published a set of studies 'Impact of the enlargement of the European Union towards central central and Eastern European countries on RTD- Innovation and Structural policies'.

Logue convened the first EU seminar on 'Women in Science' in 1993 and jointly published with LM Telapessy 'Women in Scientific and Technological Research in the European Community', highlighting the barriers to women's advancement in the Research world.

== Recent times ==
As the former vice-chairman of the North Derry Civil Rights Association gave evidence at the Saville Inquiry into Bloody Sunday. He was special adviser to the Office of First and Deputy First Minister from 1998 to 2002 and as an official of the European Commission In 2002–03, Logue was a fellow of the Institute for British – Irish Studies at University College Dublin. In July 2006, Logue was appointed as a board member of the Irish Peace Institute, based at the University of Limerick and in 2009 was appointed Vice Chairman. He is a Life Member of the Institute of International & European Affairs.

On 17 December 2007, Logue was appointed as a director to Inter-Trade Ireland (ITI) the North-South Body established under the Belfast Agreement to promote economic development in Ireland. There he chaired the ITI's Fusion programme, bringing north–south industrial development in Innovation and Research. Integrating Ireland economically has been a theme of Logue's writing throughout his career, most recently in the Irish Times and in earlier publications as economic spokesman for the Social Democratic and Labour Party (SDLP). He was economist at the Dublin-based National Board for Science and Technology from 1981 to 1984.

Logue, after leaving the European Commission in 2005, became involved in Renewable Energy and is chairman of Priority Resources as well as a director of two companies, one in Solar Energy, the other in Wind Energy. In November 2011 he was elected to the main board of European Association of Energy (EAE).

In November 2023, Logue was awarded an honorary doctorate by the University of Galway in recognition of “a lifetime dedicated to civil rights, human rights, equality and peace in Northern Ireland, Ireland and Europe”, and he donated an archive of material (more than 20 boxes of manuscripts, documents, photographs and political ephemera) on the development of the SDLP from the early 1970s to the University of Galway.

Northern Ireland Assembly (1973)
New assembly	Assembly Member for Londonderry; 1973–1974	Assembly abolished
Northern Ireland Constitutional Convention
New convention	Member for Londonderry; 1975–1976	Convention dissolved
Northern Ireland Assembly (1982)
New assembly	MPA for Londonderry; 1982–1986	Assembly abolished
