= Vincent McCloskey =

Politician from Northern Ireland (1920–1998)

Edward Vincent McCloskey (June 1920 – 1998) was an Irish nationalist politician.

Born in Belfast, McCloskey was educated at the Christian Brothers' School before becoming a heating engineer. He also became politically active, joining the National Democratic Party in 1967. He was elected to Lisburn Rural District Council in 1968, serving until 1973. He was a member of the National Democrats' final executive committee then, on the dissolution of the group in 1970, he joined the Social Democratic and Labour Party, being elected to its executive committee in 1972.

At the 1973 Northern Ireland Assembly election, McCloskey was elected for South Antrim, and he held the seat in the Northern Ireland Constitutional Convention of 1975.

McCloskey died in 1998.

Northern Ireland Assembly (1973)
New assembly	Assembly Member for South Antrim; 1973–1974	Assembly abolished
Northern Ireland Constitutional Convention
New convention	Member for South Antrim; 1975–1976	Convention dissolved
