= Londonderry (Assembly constituency) =

Constituency used for the Northern Ireland Assembly

Coordinates: 54.922°N 6.953°W

Londonderry was a constituency used for the Northern Ireland Assembly.

The seat was first used for a Northern Ireland-only election for the Northern Ireland Assembly, 1973. Members were then elected from the constituency to the 1975 Constitutional Convention and the 1982 Assembly. After the Assembly dissolved in 1986, the constituency was not used again, its area being represented by parts of East Londonderry, Foyle and Mid Ulster.

It usually shared boundaries with the Londonderry UK Parliament constituency, however the boundaries of the two constituencies were slightly different from 1983 to 1986 as the Assembly boundaries had not caught up with Parliamentary boundary changes.

For further details of the history and boundaries of the constituency, see Londonderry (UK Parliament constituency).

== Members ==
=== Northern Ireland Constitutional Convention (1975) and Northern Ireland Assembly (1973, 1982) ===
In 1982, elections were held for an Assembly for Northern Ireland to hold the Secretary of State to account, in the hope that this would be the first step towards restoring devolution. The seven members elected from the Londonderry constituency were:

Election	MLA (Party)	MLA (Party)	MLA (Party)	MLA (Party)	MLA (Party)	MLA (Party)	MLA (Party)
1973	Michael Canavan (SDLP)	John Hume (SDLP)	Hugh Logue (SDLP)	William Douglas (UUP)	Sheena Conn (UUP)	Leslie Morrell (UUP)	Glenn Barr (Vanguard)
1975	Michael Canavan (SDLP)	John Hume (SDLP)	Hugh Logue (SDLP)	William Douglas (UUP)	Sheena Conn (UUP)	James McClure (DUP)	Glenn Barr (Vanguard)
1982	Martin McGuinness (Sinn Féin)	John Hume (SDLP)	Hugh Logue (SDLP)	William Douglas (UUP)	Jack Allen (UUP)	James McClure (DUP)	Gregory Campbell (DUP)

Note: The columns in this table are used only for presentational purposes, and no significance should be attached to the order of columns. For details of the order in which seats were won at each election, see the detailed results of that election.

== Elections ==
=== 1982 Assembly Election ===
1982 Assembly election: Londonderry – 7 seats
Party	Candidate	FPv%	Count												
Party	Candidate	FPv%	1	2	3	4	5	6	7	8	9	10	11	12	13
SDLP	John Hume	19.05%	12,282												
Sinn Féin	Martin McGuinness	12.73%	8,207												
UUP	Jack Allen	9.47%	6,107	6,110.15	6,111.15	6,113.15	6,148.5	6,148.82	6,350.82	6,408.82	6,979.82	9,356.82			
DUP	James McClure	10.64%	6,857	6,860.85	6,863.85	6,871.2	6,875.2	6,875.84	7,060.84	7,876.84	7,991.97	8,826.97			
UUP	William Douglas	7.80%	5,031	5,032.75	5,034.75	5,039.1	5,046.1	5,046.58	5,754.58	6,299.58	6,487.66	8,051.01	9,243.99		
SDLP	Hugh Logue	7.49%	4,828	6,960.9	7,076.45	7,349.85	7,414.2	7,490.28	7,496.36	7,500.44	7,986.45	8,005.45	8,008.4	8,013.71	
DUP	Gregory Campbell	8.23%	5,305	5,306.05	5,306.05	5,311.05	5,327.05	5,328.01	5,337.01	5,763.36	5,801.36	5,889.36	5,980.81	6,540.13	6,945.13
SDLP	Pat Devine	4.92%	3,169	5,028.2	5,114.55	5,413.2	5,528.1	5,583.94	5,588.94	5,589.72	5,967.65	5,977.35	5,977.94	5,985.02	5,986.02
UUP	Paul Baxter	5.84%	3,766	3,768.8	3,769.15	3,772.15	3,787.15	3,787.63	4,482.63	4,501.63	5,149.98				
Alliance	Bill Matthews	3.58%	2,309	2,348.2	2,352.9	2,450.7	3,620.15	3,623.51	3,641.51	3,650.51					
DUP	William Norris	2.91%	1,876	1,877.05	1,880.05	1,883.05	1,885.05	1,886.17	1,896.17						
UUP	Thomas Fleming	2.86%	1,841	1,841	1,841.7	1,843.7	1,848.7	1,848.94							
Alliance	Ita Breen	2.10%	1,354	1,396.35	1,402.05	1,532.35									
Workers' Party	Eamon Melaugh	1.51%	974	1,046.1	1,121.55										
Sinn Féin	Cathal Crumley	0.86%	556	606.4											
Electorate: 100,198 Valid: 64,462 (64.33%) Spoilt: 1,663 Quota: 8,058 Turnout: 66,125 (65.99%)

=== 1975 Constitutional Convention ===
1975 Constitutional Convention: Londonderry – 7 seats
Party	Candidate	FPv%	Count											
Party	Candidate	FPv%	1	2	3	4	5	6	7	8	9	10	11	12
SDLP	John Hume	19.14%	11,941											
UUP	Sheena Conn	14.08%	8,789											
Vanguard	Glenn Barr	12.63%	7,883											
SDLP	Hugh Logue	10.67%	6,661	8,445.3										
UUP	William Douglas	7.91%	4,939	4,940.05	5,680.02	5,680.15	5,694.37	5,714.66	5,727.42	5,762.72	6,342.39	7,048.74	10,301.74	
SDLP	Michael Canavan	7.37%	4,600	6,661.5	6,661.72	7,229.56	7,239.26	7,622.12	7,622.29	7,715.16	7,718.65	7,760.68	7,767.25	7,779.25
DUP	James McClure	5.51%	3,436	3,437.75	3,462.94	3,463.33	3,468.33	3,483.68	3,493.64	3,523.3	4,589.3	4,766.22	5,305.67	7,509.67
Alliance	Ivor Canavan	4.63%	2,889	3,026.2	3,030.05	3,057.22	3,060.09	3,235.79	3,236.98	4,775.28	4,808.06	5,780.59	5,883.57	6,079.57
UUP	John Williamson	4.98%	3,105	3,105	3,240.85	3,240.98	3,241.33	3,257.44	3,259.93	3,297.9	3,510.84	4,186.89		
Unionist Party NI	Leslie Morrell	4.05%	2,529	2,532.5	2,549.77	2,551.46	2,553.57	2,579.38	2,580.37	2,786.57	2,921.1			
Vanguard	Randall Crawford	3.24%	2,021	2,022.05	2,056.15	2,056.15	2,057.37	2,099.7	2,149.47	2,183.99				
Alliance	Bill Matthews	3.03%	1,889	1,914.2	1,919.15	1,936.7	1,942.75	2,059.33	2,059.89					
Republican Clubs	Liam Gallagher	1.24%	773	809.75	809.75	818.2	845.68							
Republican Clubs	Patrick Kealey	0.76%	473	511.5	511.61	523.05	523.05							
NI Labour	Alan Carr	0.53%	328	334.3	335.51	338.37	339.5							
Republican Clubs	Cahal Newcombe	0.23%	146	151.25	152.13	157.72								
Electorate: 92,003 Valid: 62,402 (67.83%) Spoilt: 1,784 Quota: 7,801 Turnout: 64,186 (69.77%)

=== 1973 Assembly Election ===
1973 Assembly election: Londonderry – 7 seats
Party	Candidate	FPv%	Count										
Party	Candidate	FPv%	1	2	3	4	5	6	7	8	9	10	11
SDLP	John Hume	18.95%	12,596										
UUP	Leslie Morrell	14.57%	9,685										
SDLP	Hugh Logue	10.88%	7,230	8,767.82									
UUP	William Douglas	12.41%	8,245	8,245.68	8,865.8								
Vanguard	Glenn Barr	9.80%	6,511	6,512.46	6,540.5	6,552.02	6,562.3	6,562.4	6,930.6	6,951.9	8,567.9		
SDLP	Michael Canavan	5.49%	3,647	5,964.1	5,965.08	5,965.2	6,031.6	6,415.5	6,416.54	6,450.46	6,457.72	6,612.98	8,647.98
UUP	Sheena Conn	9.86%	6,550	6,552.38	7,080.54	7,560.5	7,603.96	7,604.16	7,677.28	7,736.26	8,027.08	8,078.06	8,096.24
Alliance	Brian Brown	3.69%	2,454	2,483.58	2,515.92	2,519.52	2,615.08	2,619.48	2,626.14	3,285.44	3.302.54	5,457.62	5,711.66
Nationalist	Eddie McAteer	5.59%	3,712	3,988.08	3,989.06	3,989.42	4,018.38	4.061.18	4,061.52	4,080.46	4,083.56	4,157.54	
Alliance	Edward McIvor	3.01%	2,001	2,062.88	2,076.46	2,077.06	2,148.78	2,160.58	2,163.14	2,523.74	2,538.44		
Vanguard	Thomas Hagan	2.06%	1,371	1,373.04	1,401.6	1,410.36	1,416.5	1,416.8	1,992.28	2,009.18			
Alliance	John Hamill	1.64%	1,093	1,113.4	1,150.92	1,154.4	1,205.12	1,207.02	1,213.82				
Vanguard	Jackson Taggart	1.52%	1,008	1,008.34	1,039.56	1,047.12	1,049.4	1,049.4					
NI Labour	Grace Stevenson	0.54%	360	367.14	375.54	376.14							
Electorate: 89,849 Valid: 66,463 (73.97%) Spoilt: 1,698 Quota: 8,308 Turnout: 68,161 (75.86%)
