= Michael Canavan (politician) =

Irish politician (1924–2026)

Michael Canavan (October 1924 – 8 October 2026) was an Irish nationalist politician and businessman.

== Life and career ==
Born in October 1924 in Derry, Canavan studied at St Columb's College in the city before entering business. By the 1960s, he owned a chain of bookmakers, a salmon-processing factory and a pub in the city. He was treasurer of the University for Derry Committee in 1965, and worked with John Hume to try to attract industry to the area.

An advocate of credit unions, Canavan founded the Derry Credit Union with Hume and chaired it from 1963 to 1966, following which he spent a year as a director of the Irish League of Credit Unions. In 1968, he was elected as Chairman of the Derry Citizens' Action Committee, and was subsequently prominent in the Derry Citizens' Defence Association and chaired the Derry Citizens' Central Council.

Canavan entered electoral politics as campaign manager for Hume at the 1969 Northern Ireland general election. Hume stood in Foyle as an independent and was elected. The following year, Canavan was a founder member of Social Democratic and Labour Party (SDLP), and served as its security spokesman for many years.

At the 1973 Northern Ireland Assembly election, he was elected for Londonderry, and he held his seat in 1975 on the Northern Ireland Constitutional Convention. However, he decided not to stand in the 1982 Assembly election, instead calling for the party to boycott to vote because there was no power-sharing in the proposed assembly. He remained active in the SDLP for some time, and chaired Derry's civic committee during the mid-1980s.

Canavan died on 8 October 2026, at the age of 102. His brother Ivor was a prominent member of the Alliance Party of Northern Ireland.

Northern Ireland Assembly (1973)
New assembly	Assembly Member for Londonderry; 1973–1974	Assembly abolished
Northern Ireland Constitutional Convention
New convention	Member for Londonderry; 1975–1976	Convention dissolved
