= Council of Ireland (disambiguation) =

The Council of Ireland was a body established under the Government of Ireland Act 1920, initially with jurisdiction over both Northern Ireland and Southern Ireland.

Council of Ireland may also refer to

- Privy Council of Ireland, de jure Irish government from the English conquest until 1921, and often called "Council of Ireland" in earlier centuries.
- Council of Ireland (1970s) short-lived cross-border body established under the Sunningdale Agreement

== See also ==
- Irish Council (disambiguation)
