= Sheena Conn =

Sheena E. Conn is a former Northern Irish unionist politician.

== Background ==
Born in Belfast, Conn studied at Queen's University Belfast, then worked as a school dentist.

Sheena married Douglas Conn, President of the North Londonderry Unionist Association, and moved to Limavady, where she joined the Ulster Unionist Party (UUP). Despite having no political experience, she stood for election in Londonderry at the 1973 Northern Ireland Assembly election, and was successful, then held her seat on the Northern Ireland Constitutional Convention in 1975.

Conn was also prominent in the Girl Guides leadership, and more recently has run a pick-your-own fruit farm.

Northern Ireland Assembly (1973)
| New assembly | Assembly Member for Londonderry; 1973–1974 | Assembly abolished |
Northern Ireland Constitutional Convention
| New convention | Member for Londonderry; 1975–1976 | Convention dissolved |
