= Nelson Elder =

Politician from Northern Ireland (born 1923)

Member of the Northern Ireland Assembly for South Belfast
- In office 28 June 1973 – 1974
- Preceded by: Assembly established
- Succeeded by: Assembly abolished

Member of the Senate of Northern Ireland
- In office 1966–1972
- Succeeded by: Senate abolished

Personal details
- Born: January 1923 Limavady, County Londonderry, Northern Ireland
- Died: 6 February 1983 (aged 60)
- Party: Ulster Unionist Party (from 1966)
- Other political affiliations: NI Labour (before 1966)

Nelson Elder (January 1923 – 6 February 1983) was a Northern Irish unionist politician.

== Early life ==
Born in Limavady, Elder worked in a bakery and joined the Northern Ireland Labour Party. He then defected to the Ulster Unionist Party (UUP) and ran the Welfare and Advice Centre of the Ulster Unionist Council.

== Career ==
He served as an Ulster Unionist Party (UUP) member of the Senate of Northern Ireland from 1966 to 1972. In 1967, he attended the founding meeting of the Northern Ireland Civil Rights Association as a representative of the UUP, but he walked out of its founding meeting after failing to convince the organisation that the murder of a police officer merited the death penalty.

Following the abolition of the Senate, Elder was elected at the 1973 Northern Ireland Assembly election, in Belfast South. On the Assembly, he served as the secretary of the backbench group of Pro-Assembly Unionists.

Elder also served as Secretary of the Unionist Trade Unionist Alliance, and as a member of the B Specials.

Northern Ireland Assembly (1973)
New assembly	Assembly Member for South Belfast; 1973–1974	Assembly abolished
