= Cecil Harvey (Northern Ireland politician) =

Member of Down District Council
- In office 20 May 1981 – 15 May 1985
- Preceded by: William Finlay
- Succeeded by: District abolished
- Constituency: Down Area A

Member of the Constitutional Convention for South Down
- In office 1975–1976

Member of the Northern Ireland Assembly for South Down
- In office 1973–1974

Personal details
- Born: 1918 Crossgar, County Down, Northern Ireland
- Died: 11 April 1985 (aged 66–67)
- Party: DUP (from 1983); United Ulster Unionist Party (1975 - 1983)
- Other political affiliations: Vanguard (1973 - 1975); Ulster Unionist (before 1973)

Cecil Harvey (1918 – 1985) was a Northern Irish unionist politician and Church elder.

== Background ==
Harvey was educated at Garvey College in Belfast. He was a founding elder of Ian Paisley's Free Presbyterian Church of Ulster, in 1951. The following year, he suggested the congregation's move from Crossgar to Whiteabbey. He was also active in the Orange Order and the Ulster Unionist Party (UUP), and was elected as a councillor. He became disillusioned with the UUP as it came to support the idea of power-sharing, and joined the rival Vanguard Unionist Progressive Party. Under this banner, he was elected from South Down to the Northern Ireland Assembly, 1973, where he was the party's chief whip, then the Northern Ireland Constitutional Convention.

In 1974, Harvey argued for the Orange Order to pay compensation to loyalists interned around the Ulster Workers' Council strike. By 1975, Harvey was calling for the Order to found an entirely new united unionist party; this was moved by Robert Overend but was defeated. Undeterred, Harvey became a founder member of the United Ulster Unionist Party, becoming the party chairman, and remaining loyal until its collapse in 1984. He then joined the Democratic Unionist Party (DUP), for which he stood unsuccessfully in South Down at the 1983 general election.

Cecil's son, Harry, later became a DUP politician.

Northern Ireland Assembly (1973)
New assembly	Assembly Member for South Down; 1973–1974	Assembly abolished
Northern Ireland Constitutional Convention
New convention	Member for South Down; 1975–1976	Convention dissolved
