= William Douglas (Northern Ireland politician, born 1923) =

Politician from Northern Ireland (1923–2013)

Chief whip of the Ulster Unionist Party in the Northern Ireland Assembly
- In office 1982–1986
- Leader: James Molyneaux
- Preceded by: Office created
- Succeeded by: Office abolished

Member of the Northern Ireland Assembly for Londonderry
- In office 20 October 1982 – 1986
- Preceded by: Assembly re-established
- Succeeded by: Assembly dissolved
- In office 28 June 1973 – 1974
- Preceded by: Assembly established
- Succeeded by: Assembly abolished

Member of the Constitutional Convention for Londonderry
- In office 1975–1976
- Preceded by: Convention created
- Succeeded by: Convention abolished

Member of Limavady Rural Council
- In office 1960–1973
- Succeeded by: Council abolished

Personal details
- Born: 10 January 1923; Limavady, Northern Ireland
- Died: 17 May 2013
- Political party: Ulster Unionist Party

William Albert Boyd Douglas (10 January 1923 – 17 May 2013) was a Northern Irish unionist politician and farmer.

== Background ==
Douglas worked as a farmer and served as a flight lieutenant in the Royal Air Force during World War II. He rose to prominence as Limavady District Master in the Orange Order, leading protests against the civil rights movement, and organising loyalist demonstrations in Dungiven.

William, also was a man that was capable of writing a catchy melody. He wrote tunes for bands and they are still played today regularly. Most of these tunes were used by his home band;Boveva Flute Band.

Douglas was also active in the Ulster Unionist Party. From 1960 to 1973, he served on Limavady Rural District Council. He was then elected in Londonderry for the Ulster Unionist Party at the 1973 Northern Ireland Assembly election, and held his seat on the Constitutional Convention and at the 1982 Assembly, at which he served as Ulster Unionist Chief Whip. He strongly opposed the Good Friday Agreement.

Douglas' son, known as Boyd Douglas, also became a politician.

Northern Ireland Assembly (1973)
New assembly	Assembly Member for Londonderry; 1973–1974	Assembly abolished
Northern Ireland Constitutional Convention
New convention	Member for Londonderry; 1975–1976	Convention dissolved
Northern Ireland Assembly (1982)
New assembly	MPA for Londonderry; 1982–1986	Assembly abolished
