= Jim Hendron =

Jim Hendron (born 1 October 1931) is a former politician in Northern Ireland.

Hendron worked as a lawyer and joined the Alliance Party of Northern Ireland on its formation. He was elected to its first Central Executive as a representative of Belfast Bloomfield. In the early 1970s, he served as the party's Chairman, and later served as president. On 5 February 1973, prior to the 1973 Northern Ireland border poll, he stated that "Support for the position of Northern Ireland as an integral part of the United Kingdom is a fundamental principle of the Alliance Party, not only for economic reasons but also because we firmly believe that a peaceful solution to our present tragic problems is only possible within a United Kingdom context. Either a Sinn Fein all-Ireland republic or a Vanguard-style Ulster republic would lead to disaster for all our people." He was elected to the Northern Ireland Constitutional Convention from South Belfast, but did not stand again until the 1997 general election, when he stood in East Belfast. Although he was not elected, he received the Alliance Party's best share of the vote that year.

Hendron's younger brother Joe Hendron was a Social Democratic and Labour Party politician.

Northern Ireland Constitutional Convention
| New convention | Member for South Belfast; 1975–1976 | Convention dissolved |
