= David McCarthy (politician) =

David McCarthy (1925 –14 July 1973) was a unionist politician in Northern Ireland.

Born in Belfast, McCarthy studied at the Belfast Municipal College of Technology before working as a quantity surveyor. He was elected to Ballymena Borough Council for the Ulster Unionist Party in 1965, serving until 1973. By 1970, he was the manager of a building firm, and became the Chairman of the Ballymena Chamber of Commerce. In 1972, he was elected Chairman of the Mid Antrim Unionist Association, and, the following year, he was appointed as President of Ballymena United F.C. At the 1973 Northern Ireland Assembly election, he was elected in North Antrim. He went on holiday immediately after the election, and was killed in a car crash. Four of his five children were in the car at the time it crashed along with his wife Daphne, all sustained injuries but none too serious. The resulting by-election was won by Clifford Smyth of the Democratic Unionist Party.

Northern Ireland Assembly (1973)
New assembly	Assembly Member for North Antrim; 1973	Succeeded by Clifford Smyth
