= Thomas Edward Burns =

Politician from Northern Ireland (born 1927)

Edward Burns

Member of the Northern Ireland Constitutional Convention for South Belfast
- In office 1975–1976

Member of the Northern Ireland Assembly for South Belfast
- In office 28 June 1973 – 1974

Personal details
- Born: 1927 Lurgan, Northern Ireland
- Party: Democratic Unionist

Thomas Edward Burns (born 1927), known as Edward Burns, is a former Northern Irish unionist politician.

== Background ==
Born in Lurgan, Burns studied at Renshaw's College in Belfast. He moved to Canada, where he worked in a bank, then to South Africa, where he was employed in construction. Burns later lived near Donaghadee and worked as the director of various property management companies.

Burns was elected to the executive of the United Ulster Loyalist Council and became active in the Democratic Unionist Party. At the 1973 Northern Ireland Assembly election, he was elected in Belfast South, and he narrowly held the seat on the Northern Ireland Constitutional Convention, in 1975.

In his spare time, Burns was an enthusiastic yachtsman and was a member of the World Christian Endeavour Choir.

Northern Ireland Assembly (1973)
New assembly	Assembly Member for South Belfast; 1973–1974	Assembly abolished
Northern Ireland Constitutional Convention
New convention	Member for South Belfast; 1975–1976	Convention dissolved
