= Eileen Paisley, Baroness Paisley of St George's =

Northern Irish politician (born 1931)

The Right Honourable The Baroness Paisley of St George's
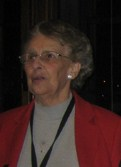
- Paisley in 2011

Member of the House of Lords
- Lord Temporal
- Life peerage 14 June 2006 – 30 October 2017

Member of the Northern Ireland Constitutional Convention for Belfast East
- In office 1 May 1975 – 1976

Member of the Legislative Assembly for Belfast East
- In office 28 June 1973 – 1974

Member of Belfast Corporation
- In office 1967–1973

Personal details
- Born: Eileen Emily Cassells; 2 November 1931 (age 95) Belfast, Northern Ireland
- Party: Democratic Unionist Party (from 1971)
- Other political affiliations: Protestant Unionist Party (1966–1971)
- Spouse: Ian Paisley (m. 1956; died 2014)
- Children: 5, including Rhonda and Ian Jr

Eileen Emily Paisley, Baroness Paisley of St George's (née Cassells; born 2 November 1931), is a Northern Irish Unionist politician from Belfast. She is the widow of Ian Paisley, Lord Bannside. Baroness Paisley became a life peer in 2006 and retired from the House of Lords on 30 October 2017. She is a vice-president of the Democratic Unionist Party.

== Early life ==
Eileen Cassells came from the well-to-do Sandown Road area of East Belfast. Her family were originally of the Presbyterian faith but became members of the Baptist Church after a disagreement with their minister. Cassells had three elder siblings, all of whom died of scarlet fever before her birth. She worked as a shorthand typist prior to her marriage to the Rev. Ian Richard Kyle Paisley on 13 October 1956, by which stage she had converted to Free Presbyterianism. Among the congregation was Roman Catholic Falls Road girl Maura Lyons whose conversion to Free Presbyterianism and subsequent disappearance had Northern Ireland spellbound for several months.

The Paisleys had five children together, daughters Sharon, Rhonda (a graduate of Bob Jones University who served as a member of Belfast City Council) and Cherith, and twin sons Kyle and Ian (the former a Free Presbyterian minister, the latter a former DUP MP).

== Career ==
Eileen Paisley was elected as a councillor in Belfast in 1967 for the Protestant Unionist Party, the forerunner to the DUP, three years before her husband was elected to Stormont and Westminster. She was also elected to the Northern Ireland Assembly in 1973 and the Northern Ireland Constitutional Convention in 1975, representing Belfast East both times.

It was announced on 11 April 2006 that she would be one of the first three members of the DUP to be created a life peer. She was gazetted on 14 June 2006 as Baroness Paisley of St George's, of St George's in the County of Antrim, after the ward that she represented on Belfast City Council. She was introduced to the House of Lords on 3 July 2006. In June 2010, she gained the additional title of Lady Bannside, of North Antrim in the County of Antrim, when her husband was also elevated to the peerage as Ian chose not to be titled "Lord Paisley" on the grounds that it would have devalued Eileen's title if he had. From 6 June 2013, Paisley was on a leave of absence from the House of Lords before retiring in October 2017.

In a December 2015 interview with the BBC, Paisley stated that she would "not go out of her way" to vote for the DUP in future elections following the party's alleged "betrayal" over her late husband's resignation as party leader in 2008.

== Arms ==
Coat of arms of Eileen Paisley, Baroness Paisley of St George's
Adopted 2007 Coronet Coronet of a Baroness Escutcheon Azure three Pallets wavy Argent enfiling five Mural Crowns in cross Or Supporters On either side two Dragons the dexter Argent wings feathered Or the sinister Or wings feathered Argent Motto CROWNED WITH LOVING KINDNESS Symbolism The wavy pallets are a river allusion and are shown enfiling five crowns as a pun on the grantee's maiden name of Cassells. Five is a significant number as the grantee has five children. Dragons refer to St George and have been differenced by membering them with feathered rather than reptilian wings.

Northern Ireland Assembly (1973)
New assembly	Assembly Member for East Belfast; 1973–1974	Assembly abolished
Northern Ireland Constitutional Convention
New convention	Member for East Belfast; 1975–1976	Convention dissolved
