= Irish Society =

Irish Society or The Irish Society may refer to:

- Category:Society of Ireland; in particular:
  - Demographics of Ireland (disambiguation)
  - Culture of Ireland
- The Irish Society for Promoting the Education of the Native Irish through the Medium of Their Own Language (1818–1914), Protestant missionary society
- The Honourable The Irish Society, London society set up in 1613 for the plantation of County Londonderry
- The Society of United Irishmen, 1790s radical organisation
- Benevolent Irish Society, Newfoundland philanthropic organisation
