= Kevin Lynch (hunger striker) =

Irish Republican (1956–1981)

- Caoimhín Ó Loingsigh
- Born: 25 May 1956; Park, County Londonderry, Northern Ireland
- Died: 1 August 1981 (aged 25); Maze Prison in Maze, County Down, Northern Ireland
- Cause of death: Hunger strike
- Organization: INLA
- Known for: Hunger strike of 71 days, from 23 May 1981

Kevin Lynch (25 May 1956 – 1 August 1981) was an Irish republican and member of the Irish National Liberation Army (INLA) from Park, County Londonderry, Northern Ireland. The Dungiven hurling team was renamed Kevin Lynch's Hurling Club in his honour after his death on hunger strike.

== Early life ==
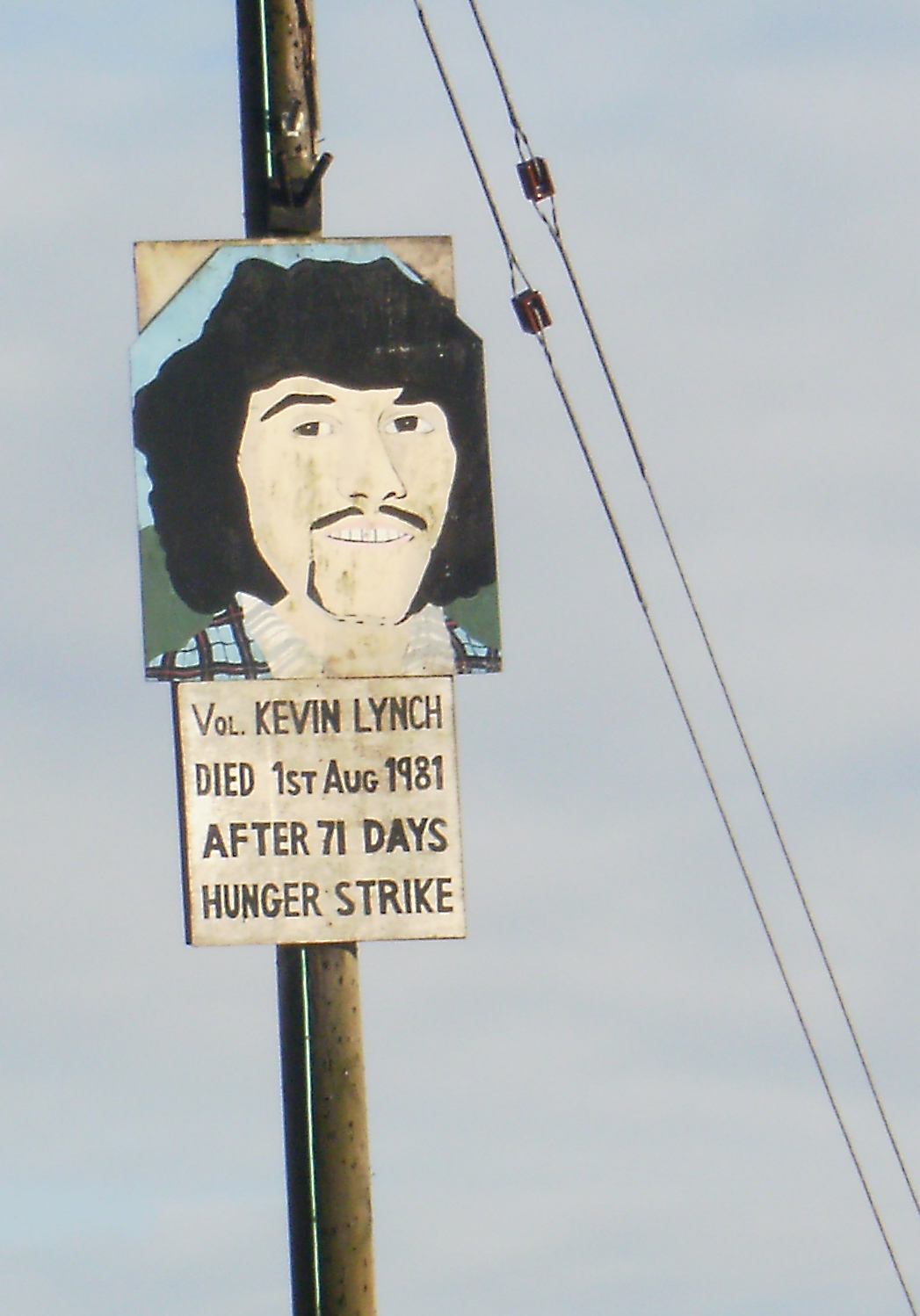
Placard honouring Lynch in Dungiven

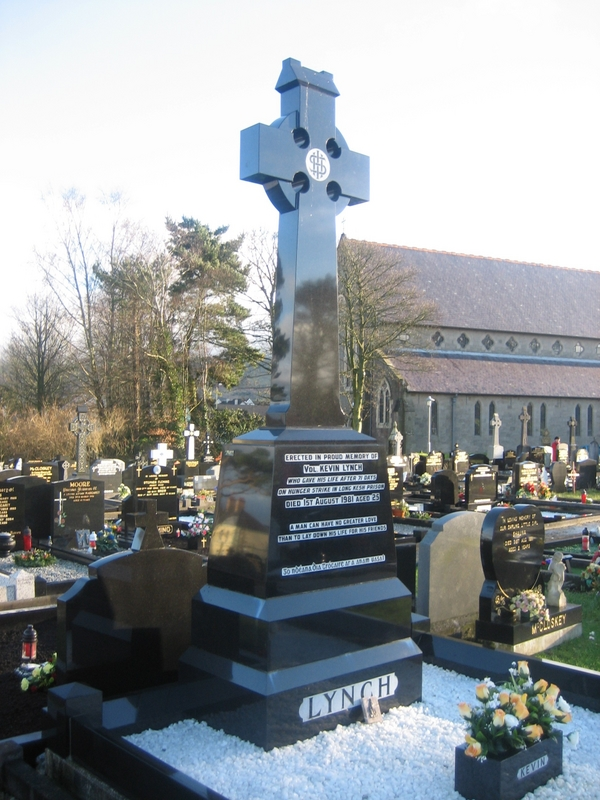
Gravestone

Kevin Lynch was the youngest in a family of eight children born to Paddy and Bridie Lynch in Park, north County Londonderry.

Lynch's older brother, Frank, was an amateur boxer and he also participated in the sport as well as Gaelic football and hurling. Lynch was a member of the winning Dungiven team which won the Feile na nGael Division 3 in Thurles, County Tipperary in 1971 and in 1972 he captained the Derry Hurling team to an Under-16 All-Ireland title at Croke Park, Dublin by defeating County Armagh.

== Paramilitary career ==
At fourteen years of age Lynch joined the local branch of Fianna Éireann, at that time linked to the Official IRA. He disagreed with the ceasefire called by the Official IRA in 1972 and joined an independent republican active service unit in the South Londonderry area. Lynch later became a member of the Irish National Liberation Army (INLA).

Lynch was tried, convicted and sentenced to ten years for stealing shotguns, taking part in a punishment shooting and conspiring to take arms from the security forces. He was sent to the Maze Prison in December 1977. He became involved with the blanket protest, joined the 1981 hunger strike at the Maze on 23 May 1981 and died 71 days later.

== Other information ==
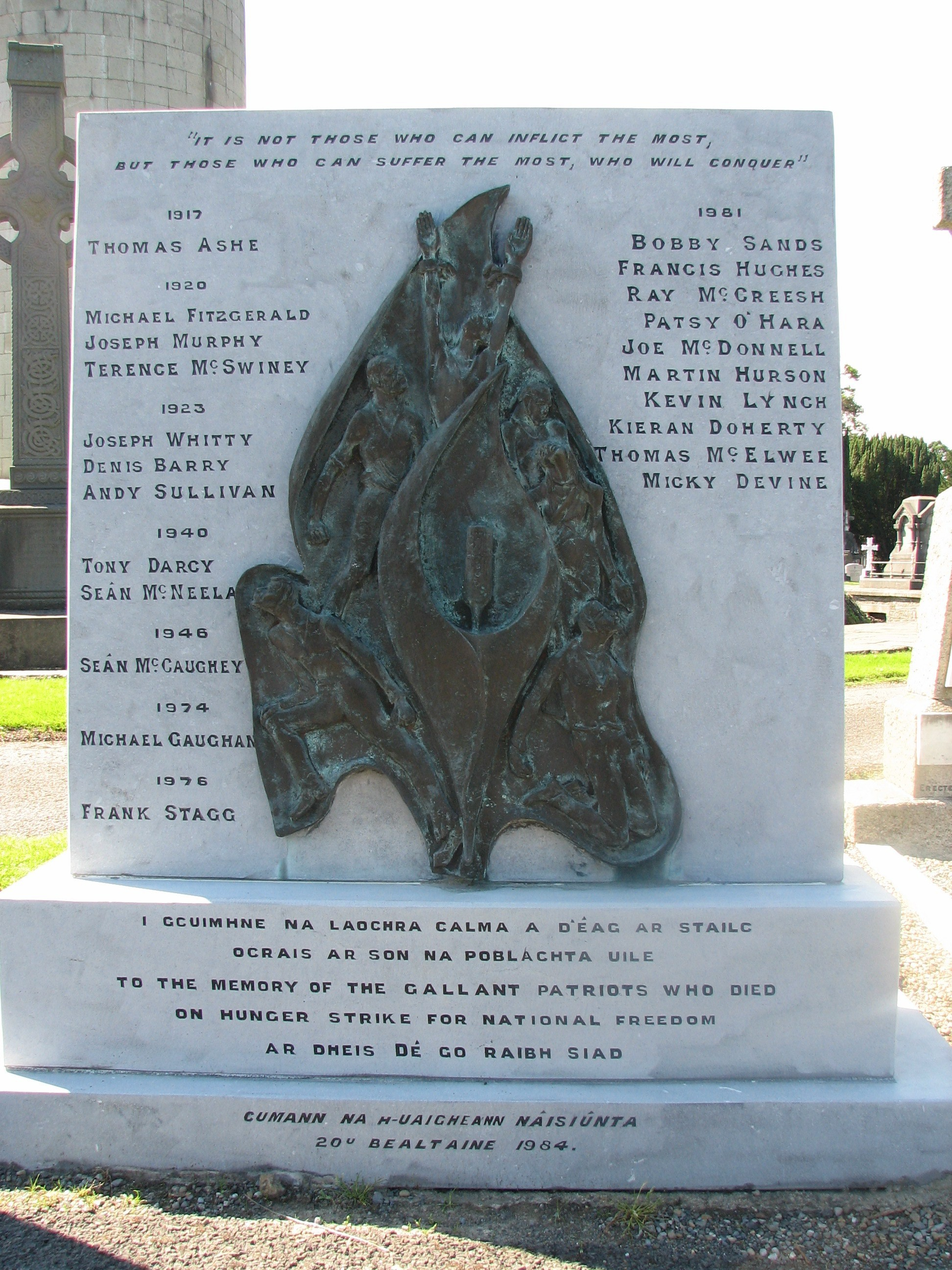
Hunger Strikers Memorial Glasnevin Cemetery Dublin

Lynch and the other hunger strikers are commemorated on the Irish Patriots and Martyrs of 1798, 1916 and 1981 Memorial in Waverley Cemetery in Sydney, Australia. Lynch was one of 22 Irishmen who died on hunger strike in the 20th century. For more information see the Ireland section in Hunger strike.
