= John Dunlop (Unionist politician) =

Northern Irish unionist politician

Member of Parliament for Mid Ulster
- In office 28 February 1974 – 9 June 1983
- Preceded by: Bernadette Devlin
- Succeeded by: William McCrea

Personal details
- Born: 20 May 1910 County Tyrone, Northern Ireland
- Died: 10 March 1996 (aged 85)
- Party: United Ulster Unionist (1975- 1984)
- Other political affiliations: Ulster Vanguard (1974 - 1975)

John Dunlop (20 May 1910 – 10 March 1996) was a Northern Irish unionist politician.

== Political career ==
He was the son of Martin Dunlop, and went to college in Belfast.

He was Member of Parliament for Mid Ulster from 1974 to 1983. Initially elected as a member of the Vanguard Progressive Unionist Party, from 1976 he represented the short-lived breakaway United Ulster Unionist Party. He also supported the United Unionist Action Council, led by Ian Paisley. Eisenhower Fellowships selected John Dunlop in 1989 to represent Northern Ireland. In 1982, he stood unsuccessfully for election to the Northern Ireland Assembly, achieving the lowest-ever vote for a sitting MP at a regional-level election.

Northern Ireland Assembly (1973)
New assembly	Assembly Member for Mid-Ulster; 1973–1974	Assembly abolished
Parliament of the United Kingdom
Preceded by Bernadette Devlin	Member of Parliament for Mid Ulster; Feb 1974–1983	Succeeded by William McCrea
