= Park, County Londonderry =

Village in County Londonderry, Northern Ireland

Coordinates: 54.864°N 7.084°W

Park: Irish: An Pháirc; Scots: Tha Fiel
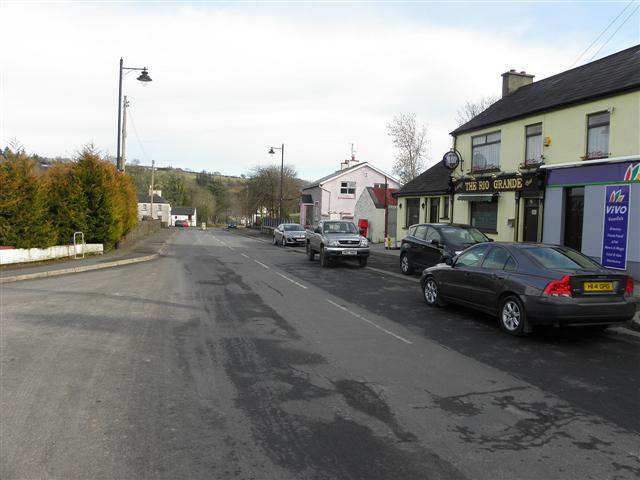
- Learmount Road

- Location within Northern Ireland
- District: Derry City and Strabane
- County: County Londonderry
- Country: Northern Ireland
- Sovereign state: United Kingdom
- Post town: LONDONDERRY
- Postcode district: BT47
- Dialling code: 028
- Police: Northern Ireland
- Fire: Northern Ireland
- Ambulance: Northern Ireland
- UK Parliament: East Londonderry
- NI Assembly: East Londonderry

Park is a small village in County Londonderry, Northern Ireland. It sits on the banks of the River Faughan and the foothills of the Sperrin Mountains near the village of Claudy. The village adjoins the 120-hectare Learmount Forest; Learmount Castle is situated in the forest, and has stood for hundreds of years.

== Sport ==
The local sports clubs are St Joseph's Craigbane and St. Mary's GAC Banagher. The teams play at Gerry Crossan Park and Fr. McNally Park respectively. There used to be a soccer team named Park F.C that was situated in the village however this does not exist anymore.

== Notable people ==
- Antonia Logue, novelist, born in Park
- Kevin Lynch, hunger striker, born in Park

== See also ==
- List of villages in Northern Ireland
- List of towns in Northern Ireland
