= Demographics of Ireland =

Demographics of Ireland may refer to:

- Demographics of the Republic of Ireland
- Demographics of Northern Ireland
- Irish population analysis (island)
