= Local government in Ireland =

Local government in Ireland may refer to:

- Local government in the Republic of Ireland
- Local government in Northern Ireland
- History of local government in Ireland, includes period before partition between Northern Ireland and Republic of Ireland
