= John Baxter (Northern Ireland politician) =

Northern Irish politician (1939–2020)

Member of the Northern Ireland Assembly for North Antrim
- In office 28 June 1973 – 1974
- Preceded by: Assembly established
- Succeeded by: Assembly abolished

Personal details
- Born: 25 November 1939 Coleraine, Northern Ireland
- Died: 7 March 2020 (aged 80)
- Party: Ulster Unionist Party
- Education: Trinity College Dublin; Queen's University Belfast; Tulane University

John Lawson Baxter (25 November 1939 – 7 March 2020) was a Northern Irish solicitor and unionist politician.

== Life and career ==
John Lawson Baxter was born in Coleraine on 25 November 1939. He studied at Trinity College Dublin, where he was secretary of Trinity Week, then Queen's University Belfast and Tulane University in New Orleans, before returning to Coleraine to work as a solicitor. In 1969, he was President of Coleraine Chamber of Commerce, and from 1970 to 1972, he lectured at the New University of Ulster.

Baxter was elected for the Ulster Unionist Party in North Antrim at the 1973 Northern Ireland Assembly election, and was appointed to the 1974 Executive as Head of the Department of Information Services. He subsequently left politics to focus on his legal career, and is currently a member of the Law Society's Practice Advisory Service, a member of the Criminal Injuries Compensation Appeals Panel Northern Ireland, Deputy Coroner for North Antrim and a member of the Council of the University of Ulster.

John Baxter died on 7 March 2020, at the age of 80.

Northern Ireland Assembly (1973)
New assembly	Assembly Member for North Antrim; 1973–1974	Assembly abolished
