= Leslie Morrell =

Northern Irish politician

Leslie Morrell (born 26 December 1931) is a former unionist politician in Northern Ireland.

Morrell was a farmer from near Coleraine, and was active in the Ulster Unionist Party (UUP). He was elected to Coleraine Rural District Council in 1962, then Londonderry County Council in 1969. He was on several committees, on Coleraine Harbour Board and Coleraine Hospital Management Board as well as Tourism and Water until the 1973 Reorganisation. In 1973, he was elected to Coleraine District Council and during his service on the council was successful in expanding housing in Articlave and getting a swimming pool, seafront promenade, bowling green and community hall for Castlerock. He was elected on first preference to the Northern Ireland Assembly from the Londonderry constituency. Although he was a supporter of UUP leader Brian Faulkner, Morrell refused to sign a pledge to support a relevant White Paper, as asked; however, he became Deputy Leader of the UUP under Brian Faulkner, with Morrell's wife becoming Vice President of the Ulster Women's Unionist Association under Lucy Faulkner. Morrell was a member of the team that met SDLP and Alliance for talks that led to the formation of the NI Executive, and he was at the Sunningdale Conference where he negotiated the Council of Ireland with Garret FitzGerald. He introduced the Shannon-Erne Waterway as a cross-border initiative, giving it further encouragement when on the NI Water Council.

Faulkner appointed Morrell as Minister of Agriculture when the Northern Ireland Executive was created. After Sunningdale when Faulkner resigned after losing a vote on the Agreement in the Unionist Council, and Morrell was expelled from the UUP by the North Londonderry Constituency Association, he joined Faulkner's new Unionist Party of Northern Ireland, becoming deputy leader of the party. The Executive fell as a result of the Ulster Workers' Strike in May 1974. However, Morrell lost his seat in Londonderry in the 1975 elections to the Northern Ireland Constitutional Convention. Morrell did not defend his seat in the 1977 Northern Ireland local elections, and resigned as deputy leader of the party in 1978, to focus on farming and developing the Voluntary Housing Movement in Northern Ireland

He had attended the Corrymeela Conference on Housing in December 1974 and was elected as a member of the Steering Group to develop Voluntary ( Social ) Housing. When the Federation of Housing associations was set up in 1976 he represented Ulster Provident Housing and was founder-chair of James Butcher Housing NI in February 1976. He was the second chair of NIFHA in 1981/2 and vacated chair of James Butcher in 1982 to become honorary secretary instead. He retained this office after James Butcher and NIH merged to form Oaklee Housing Association and later when Choice Housing Ireland Ltd. was formed by the merger of Oaklee, Trinity and Ulidia HA's. He retired on 31 March 2016 but was elected as the first honorary president of Choice Housing. In 2015 the UK Institute of Housing recognised his contribution to the development of Social housing in Northern Ireland with a Lifetime Achievement Award He helped launch Oaklee Housing Trust, now re-named Oaklee Housing, in the Republic of Ireland with funds from Oaklee, later being elected to its board where he served until 2018 when tenure ended under the Rules.

He founded and chaired the Virus-tested Seed Potato Growers Association, formed from those who produced the basic healthy seed for the industry in NI., and was a founder member of the NI Institute of Agricultural Science. Before his election to the assembly, he was an active member of the Ulster Farmers Union, became chair of its Potato Committee, on the Executive, and was appointed to the NI Agricultural Council, which elected him as chairman for several years until it was superseded by the NI Assembly in 1973. In 1982, during Direct Rule, he was invited to chair the NI Water Council, a post he held for 10 years, being appointed an OBE in 1986 for his services to water.

Northern Ireland Assembly (1973)
New assembly	Assembly Member for Londonderry; 1973–1974	Assembly abolished
