= Antonia Logue =

Antonia Logue is an Irish novelist from Park, County Londonderry, Northern Ireland. Logue was born in Derry in 1972.

She is the only daughter of Hugh Logue (politician and economist) and Anne Logue (a lawyer). She grew up in the village of Park, near Derry, but also lived in Brussels, for a time. She won her first literary prize aged 10.

Logue attended Trinity College and joined the faculty at Columbia College in Chicago in 2002.

Logue started her career as a journalist.

Her first novel, Shadow-Box, won The Irish Times Literature Award for an Irish novel and was shortlisted for the John Llewellyn Rhys Prize. She has been a faculty member in Creative Writing at Oxford University, Columbia College, and the University of Chicago, and held fellowships at St John's College, Cambridge, Wolfson College, Cambridge, and CRASSH (Centre for Research in the Arts, Social Sciences and Humanities) at Cambridge University. She was a visiting fellow at Oriel College, Oxford.

Logue lives in London with her husband and two children.
