= Sunningdale Agreement =

1973 treaty between Ireland and the United Kingdom

- Signed: 9 December 1973
- Location: Civil Service College, Sunningdale Park, Sunningdale, Berkshire
- Original signatories: Liam Cosgrave; Edward Heath
- Parties: Republic of Ireland; United Kingdom
- Language: English

The Sunningdale Agreement was an attempt to establish a power-sharing Northern Ireland Executive and a cross-border Council of Ireland. The agreement was signed by the British and Irish government in Sunningdale Park, Sunningdale, Berkshire, on 9 December 1973. Unionist opposition, violence and a general strike caused the collapse of the agreement in May 1974.

== Northern Ireland Assembly ==
On 20 March 1973, the British government published a white paper which proposed a 78-member Northern Ireland Assembly, to be elected by proportional representation. The British government would retain control over law, order and finance, while a Council of Ireland composed of members of the executive of the Republic of Ireland, Dáil Éireann, the Northern Ireland Executive and the Northern Ireland Assembly would act in a consultative role. The assembly was to replace the suspended Stormont Parliament, but it was hoped that it would not be dominated by the Ulster Unionist Party (UUP) in the same way, and would thus be acceptable to Nationalists.

The Northern Ireland Assembly Bill resulting from the white paper became law on 3 May 1973, and elections for the new assembly were held on 28 June. The agreement was supported by the nationalist Social Democratic and Labour Party (SDLP), the unionist UUP and the cross-community Alliance Party. The pro-agreement parties won a clear majority of seats (52 to 26), but a substantial minority inside the Ulster Unionist Party opposed the agreement.

== Power-sharing executive ==
Following the assembly elections, negotiations between the pro-white paper parties on the formation of a "power-sharing executive" began. The main concerns were internment, policing and the question of a Council of Ireland.

On 21 November agreement was reached on a voluntary coalition of pro-agreement parties (unlike the provisions of the Belfast Agreement, which established the d'Hondt method for the election of ministers, proportionally to the main parties in the assembly). Prominent members of the executive included Unionist former Prime Minister Brian Faulkner as chief executive, SDLP leader Gerry Fitt as deputy chief executive, future Nobel Laureate and SDLP leader John Hume as Minister for Commerce and leader of the Alliance Party Oliver Napier as Legal Minister and head of the Office of Law Reform. Other members of the Executive included Unionist Basil McIvor as Minister for Education, Unionist Herbert Kirk as Minister for Finance, SDLP member Austin Currie as Minister for Housing, Unionist Leslie Morrell as Minister for Agriculture, SDLP member Paddy Devlin as Minister for Health and Social Services, Unionist Roy Bradford as Minister for Environment, and Unionist John Baxter as Minister for information. This new power-sharing executive, made up of the above members, took up office and had its first meeting on 1 January 1974. The UUP was deeply divided: its Standing Committee voted to participate in the executive by a margin of 132 to 105.

Proposed executive
Portfolio	Minister	Party	Constitutional Position
Chief Executive	Brian Faulkner	UUP	Unionist
Deputy Chief Executive	Gerry Fitt	SDLP	Nationalist
Minister of Agriculture	Leslie Morrell	UUP	Unionist
Minister of Commerce	John Hume	SDLP	Nationalist
Minister of Education	Basil McIvor	UUP	Unionist
Minister of the Environment	Roy Bradford	UUP	Unionist
Minister of Finance	Herbert Kirk	UUP	Unionist
Minister of Health and Social Services	Paddy Devlin	SDLP	Nationalist
Minister of Housing, Local Government and Planning	Austin Currie	SDLP	Nationalist
Minister of Information	John Baxter	UUP	Unionist
Legal Minister and Head of the Office of Law Reform	Oliver Napier	Alliance	Non-sectarian

== Council of Ireland ==
Provisions for a Council of Ireland existed in the Government of Ireland Act 1920, but these had never been carried out in practice. Unionists resented the idea of any "interference" by what was then Southern Ireland in the territory. In 1973, after agreement had been reached on the formation of an executive, agreement was sought to re-establish a Council of Ireland to stimulate co-operation with the now Republic of Ireland. Talks were held between 6 and 9 December in the Berkshire town of Sunningdale between the British Prime Minister Edward Heath, the Irish Taoiseach Liam Cosgrave and the three pro-agreement parties.

The talks agreed on a two-part Council of Ireland:

- The Council of Ministers was to be composed of seven members from the power-sharing executive, and seven members from the Irish Government. It was to have "executive and harmonising functions and a consultative role".
- The Consultative Assembly was to be made up of 30 members from Dáil Éireann and 30 members from the Northern Ireland Assembly. It was to have "advisory and review functions" only.

On 9 December, a communiqué announcing the agreement was issued, which later became known as the "Sunningdale Agreement".

== Reaction ==
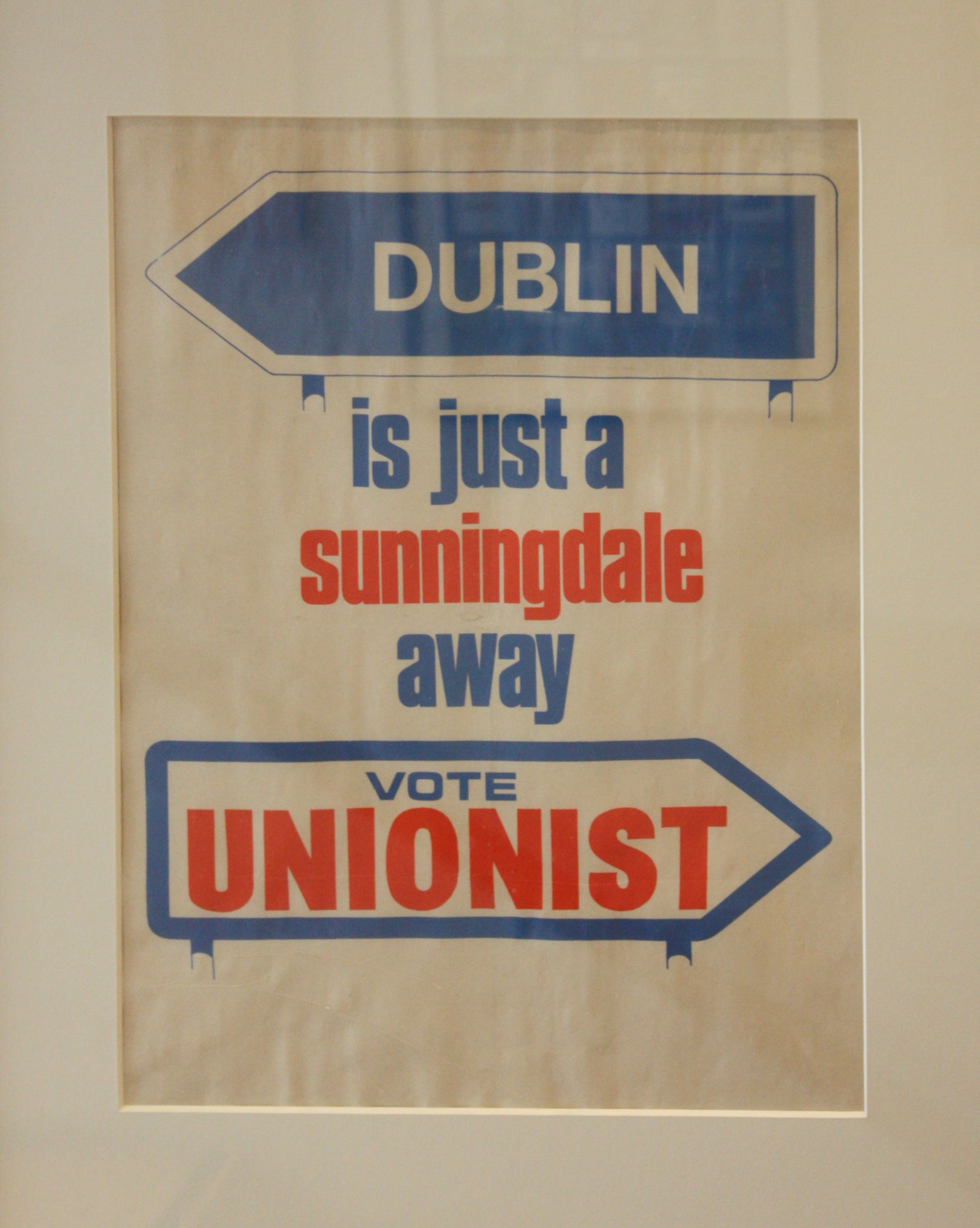
A unionist poster from 1974

It was eventually agreed that the executive functions of the Council would be limited to "tourism, conservation, and aspects of animal health", but this did not reassure the unionists, who saw any influence by the Republic over Northern affairs as a step closer to a united Ireland. They saw their fears confirmed when SDLP councillor Hugh Logue publicly described the Council of Ireland as "the vehicle that would trundle unionists into a united Ireland" in a speech at Trinity College, Dublin. On 10 December, the day after the agreement was announced, loyalist paramilitaries formed the Ulster Army Council – a coalition of loyalist paramilitary groups, including the Ulster Defence Association and the Ulster Volunteer Force, which would oppose the agreement.

In January 1974, the Ulster Unionist Party narrowly voted against continued participation in the assembly and Faulkner resigned as leader, to be succeeded by the anti-Sunningdale Harry West. The following month a general election took place. The Ulster Unionists formed the United Ulster Unionist Council (UUUC) as a coalition of anti-agreement unionists with the Vanguard Progressive Unionist Party and the Democratic Unionist Party to stand a single anti-Sunningdale candidate in each constituency. The pro-Sunningdale parties, the SDLP, the Alliance, the Northern Ireland Labour Party and the "Pro Assembly Unionists" made up of Faulkner's supporters, were disunited and ran candidates against one another. When the results were declared, the UUUC had captured eleven of the twelve constituencies, several of which had been won on split votes. Only West Belfast returned a pro-Sunningdale MP (Gerry Fitt). The UUUC declared that this represented a democratic rejection of the Sunningdale Assembly and Executive, and sought to bring them down by any means possible.

In March 1974, pro-agreement unionists withdrew their support for the agreement, calling for the Republic of Ireland to remove the Articles 2 and 3 of its constitution first (these articles would not be revised until the Good Friday Agreement of 1998).

== Collapse ==
Following the defeat of a motion condemning power-sharing in the Northern Ireland Assembly, the Ulster Workers' Council, a loyalist organisation, called a general strike for 15 May. After two weeks of barricades, shortages, rioting and intimidation, Brian Faulkner resigned as chief executive and the Sunningdale Agreement collapsed on 28 May 1974.

The strike succeeded because the British government was reluctant to use force to stop the disruption of essential services, the only significant part of the protest.

The most crippling aspect of the strike was its effect on electricity supply – the Ballylumford power station generated Belfast's electricity and that of most of Northern Ireland. The workforce was overwhelmingly Protestant and effective control was firmly in the hands of UWC. John Hume's plan to cut the Northern Ireland electricity grid in two and rely on the power generated by Coolkeeragh power station (where many Catholics worked) to keep Derry and environs in business while undermining the unionist strikers in the east was rejected by the British Secretary of State Merlyn Rees.

In later strikes the security forces were prepared to use force immediately, and so intimidatory barricades – essential to the success of the UWC strike – were suppressed from the outset.

== Legacy ==
The 1998 Good Friday Agreement (GFA), on which the current system of Northern Irish devolution is based, closely resembles the Sunningdale Agreement. SDLP politician Seamus Mallon, who was part of the negotiations, famously described the agreement as 'Sunningdale for slow learners'. This assertion has been criticised by political scientists like Richard Wilford and Stefan Wolff. The former stated that "there are... significant differences between them [Sunningdale and Belfast], both in terms of content and the circumstances surrounding their negotiation, implementation, and operation". Among these differences in circumstance was a belief among republicans at the time of the Sunningdale Agreement that a British withdrawal from Northern Ireland was "inevitable", which was no longer the case in 1998.

== See also ==
- The Troubles
- Anglo-Irish Agreement (1985)
- Downing Street Declaration (1993)
- Good Friday Agreement (1998)
