= Vanguard Unionist Progressive Party =

Former Northern Irish political party

- Leader: William Craig
- Founded: February 1972
- Dissolved: February 1978
- Split from: Ulster Unionist Party (in December 1973)
- Merged into: Ulster Unionist Party
- Ideology: British nationalism Ulster loyalism Anti-Power Sharing (until 1975); Anti-communism
- Political position: Right-wing to far-right

Party flag

The Vanguard Unionist Progressive Party (VUPP), informally known as Ulster Vanguard, was a unionist political party which existed in Northern Ireland between 1972 and 1978. Led by William Craig, the party emerged from a split in the Ulster Unionist Party (UUP) and was closely affiliated with several loyalist paramilitary groups. The party was set up in opposition to compulsory power sharing with Irish nationalist parties. It opposed the Sunningdale Agreement and was involved in extra-parliamentary activity against the agreement. However, in 1975, during discussions on the constitutional status of Northern Ireland in the constitutional convention, William Craig suggested the possibility of voluntary power sharing with the nationalist Social Democratic and Labour Party. In consequence the party split, with dissenters forming the United Ulster Unionist Party. Thereafter Vanguard declined and following poor results in the 1977 local government elections, Craig merged the remainder of Vanguard into the UUP in February 1978.

== Origins ==
It had its roots in the Vanguard or Ulster Vanguard wing of the Ulster Unionist Party who were opposed to the policies of the party's leader, and last Prime Minister of Northern Ireland, Brian Faulkner. The Ulster Vanguard movement was originally a political pressure group within the UUP. It was formed on 9 February 1972 and was led by William Craig (former Minister of Home Affairs at Stormont) with its deputy leaders Rev Martin Smyth and the former Stormont MP for Carrick, Captain Austin Ardill. At its first meeting in Lisburn, on 13 February 1972, Craig made the first of a number of bellicose pronouncements, declaring, "God help those who get in our way for we mean business."

After the suspension of the Stormont Parliament, Faulkner moved towards a policy of power-sharing with nationalist and non-sectarian politicians under the Sunningdale Agreement. In opposition to this many in the Ulster Unionists broke away and founded a separate Vanguard Party, with William Craig as the leader.

== Ideology ==
Vanguard is usually considered to have been a right-wing party. The presence of features such as an honour guard and a common salute led opponents to accuse it of being fascist. In its earliest days, it adopted the style associated with falangist parties with an honour guard, a common salute and a habit of wearing sashes. This led to it being characterised as Mosleyite or even neo-Nazi, with the Stormont unionist MP William McConnell claiming that Vanguard rallies involved "a certain Hitlerian-type figure... walking up and down the lines, inspecting his so-called storm-troopers." Craig however denied that the party was either neo-Nazi or paramilitary.

Ulster Vanguard was intended to provide an umbrella organisation for various loyalist groups. It had close links with, and strong support from loyalist paramilitary groups. Vanguard had its own paramilitary grouping called the Vanguard Service Corps (USC), whose main function seemed to be to provide escorts for Vanguard speakers attending rallies.

== Policies ==
Vanguard strongly criticised the imposition of direct rule and in its booklet 'Ulster – A Nation', published in April 1972, it pledged "resistance to an undemocratic and un-British regime" and suggested the possibility of a federal British Isles.

At the Darlington Conference in September 1972, held to discuss various constitutional options for Northern Ireland, they proposed the restoration of the Northern Ireland Parliament as a single-chamber assembly with a committee system to ensure greater participation by all parties. Internal security responsibilities would be restored. However, there would be a bill of rights to safeguard the rights of minorities.

It demanded the "extermination" of the Provisional Irish Republican Army and a reversal of the reforms introduced by Brian Faulkner and his predecessor. In a booklet published in late 1972 entitled 'Community of the British Isles', it even flirted with the idea of full independence for Northern Ireland, albeit within a structure which would also include Great Britain and the Republic of Ireland.

In late 1973 it rejected the idea of compulsory power-sharing with Irish Nationalists and consequently refused invitations to take part in the conferences which led to the Sunningdale Agreement.

In their 1974 Westminster manifesto, they called for the more mainstream Unionist option of either devolved government with full security responsibilities or full integration into the UK.

However, there were occasions when it did not follow the same course as other right-wing or unionist parties. For example, in the 1975 referendum on the United Kingdom's membership of the-then European Economic Community, it campaigned for the United Kingdom to remain a member whilst the other Unionist parties campaigned for withdrawal.

=== Extra-Parliamentary activity ===
Vanguard was firmly supportive of extra-parliamentary activity in the form of direct action to achieve its goals. On 26 January 1972, Craig announced plans to hold large rallies in major centres in Northern Ireland. The culmination was a large rally on 18 March 1972 in Belfast's Ormeau Park, attended by up to 60,000 people, at which Craig said, "We must build up the dossiers on the men and women who are a menace to this country, because one day, ladies and gentlemen, if the politicians fail, it will be our duty to liquidate the enemy."

Following the suspension of Stormont and the imposition of direct rule in March 1972, Vanguard organised a general strike which lasted from 27 to 29 March. It affected power supplies, caused businesses to close and halted public transport. About 190,000 people participated and Vanguard members barricaded and took effective control of the town of Portadown. Later 100,000 unionists converged on the drive leading to Stormont, where Craig addressed the crowds, but deferred to the outgoing Prime Minister Brian Faulkner, who managed to disperse the crowds. On 3 June 1972, VUPP organised a march in Derry against the creation of no-go areas in nationalist districts, which ended in violence on the city's Craigavon Bridge. Despite the violence, Craig pledged to continue the marches stating: "We are no longer protesting – we are demanding action."

In February 1973 it was one of the only parties to support the two-day general strike organised by the Loyalist Association of Workers in protest at the internment of Protestants. The strike had the further stated goal to "re-establish some kind of Protestant or loyalist control over the affairs in the province, especially over security policy". The strike resulted in high levels of violence with five people, including a fireman, being killed, seven people wounded, several explosions and numerous malicious fires.

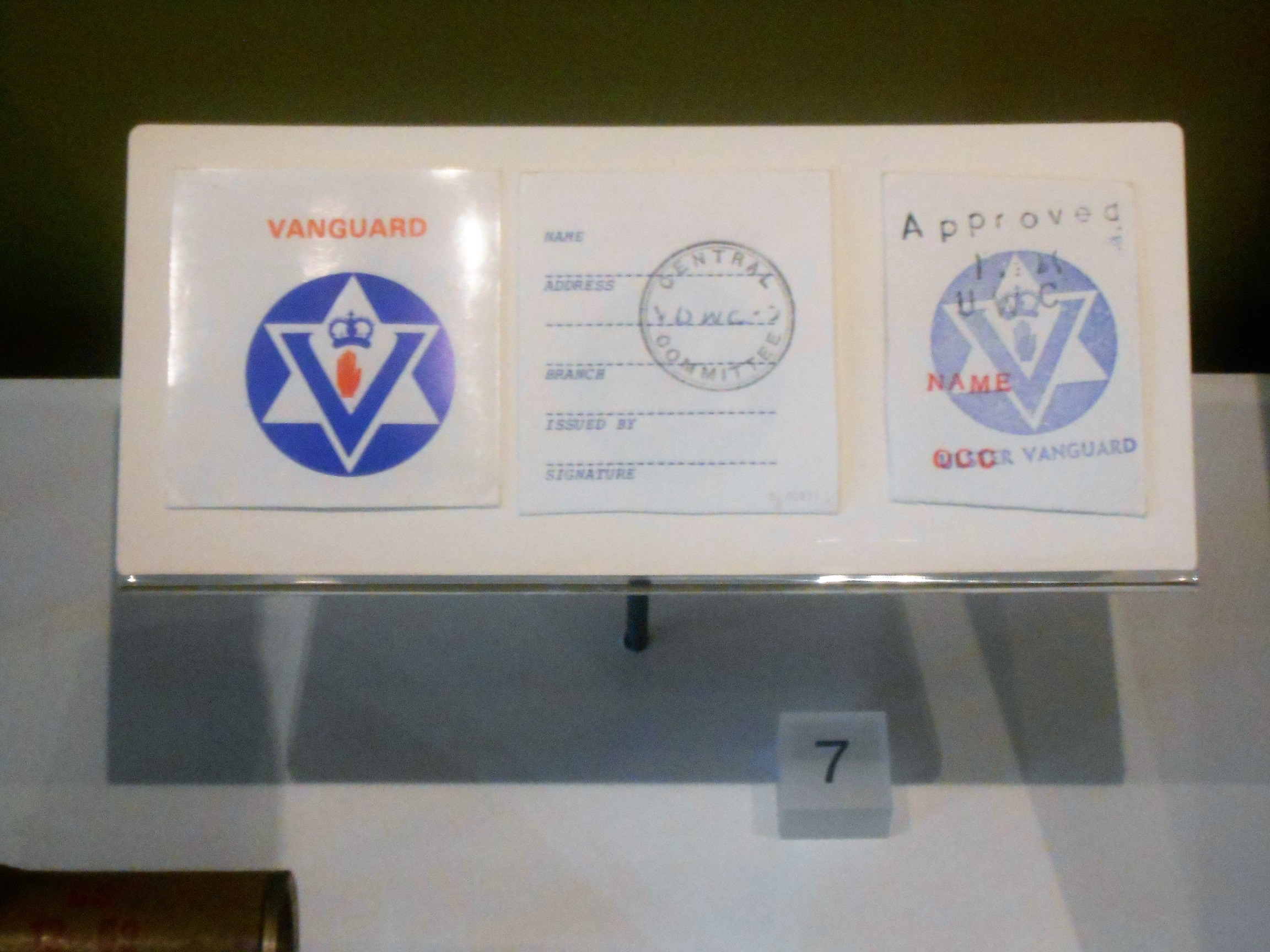
Pass card issued by the Ulster Workers' Council to members for use during the strike, showing the Vanguard emblem.

The strike proved to be a forerunner of the Ulster Workers Council Strike the following year, in which VUPP again played a prominent role, making their headquarters in Hawthornden Road, Belfast, available to the strike leaders. with Craig a leading member of the UWC co-ordinating committee

In addition to large rallies, Vanguard used other tactics to try to put pressure on the British Government. In July 1972, they called for a rent and rate strike, a proposal which put them at odds with other unionist parties and which was criticised by the DUP. Several months later, on 19 October 1972, Craig addressed a meeting of the right wing Conservative Monday Club during which he claimed he could mobilise 80,000 men "who are prepared to come out and shoot and kill."

== Electoral performances ==
The party contested a succession of elections: to the brief Sunningdale Assembly, the February 1974 General Election, the October 1974 General Election and the 1975 elections to the Constitutional Convention. The 1973 Sunningdale and local council elections were fought in an informal alliance with the DUP as "the loyalist coalition" while the latter three were fought as part of the United Ulster Unionist Council, a more formal arrangement, with the Democratic Unionist Party and the Ulster Unionists, where the anti-Sunningdale wing of the party was now in control.

Vanguard election results 1973–1977
Date	Election	Number of votes	% of total votes	No. of members elected	Total no. of seats available
May 1973	Local council elections	13,305	1.6	8–10^{*}	524
June 1973	Northern Ireland Assembly	75,709	11.5	7	78
February 1974	Westminster election	75,944	10.6	3	12
October 1974	Westminster election	92,622	13.1	3	12
May 1975	Northern Ireland Constitutional Convention	83,507	12.7	14	78
May 1977	Local council elections	8,135	1.5	5	524

- Note: VUPP percentage figures in the Westminster elections are for Northern Ireland only

During the 1973–75 period VUPP was able to match or even beat the DUP in several elections. However, their prospect of replacing the DUP as the second party of Unionism ended as a result of events during the Constitutional Convention.

=== February 1974 UK general election ===
Constituency	Candidate	Votes	%	Position
Belfast East	William Craig	27,817	48.4	1
Belfast South	Robert Bradford	22,083	42.6	1
Mid Ulster	John Dunlop	26,044	39.0	1

=== October 1974 UK general election ===
Constituency	Candidate	Votes	%	Position
Belfast East	William Craig	31,594	59.1	1
Belfast South	Robert Bradford	30,116	59.2	1
Mid Ulster	John Dunlop	30,552	47.4	1

== Split ==
The Constitutional Convention was intended to serve as a forum to allow the politicians of Northern Ireland to draw up their own proposals for the political future of the province, though this proved unsuccessful. However, it led to William Craig proposing a voluntary coalition with the nationalist SDLP in the event of there being a state of emergency. The move was a considerable surprise, with a confidential government memo commenting: "Mr. Craig appears to some as a knight in shining armour. The fact is that his aims were – and still are – simple: to get a devolved government which would control security policy as quickly as possible, on the basis of a gentleman's agreement that the SDLP would participate in government for a year or two." But any idea of power sharing was anathema to many Unionist in the post-Sunningdale climate of 1975. Indeed, in January 1976, Deputy leader Ernest Baird warned that "If Westminster does not accept the Protestants' rejection of power-sharing, it must face the inevitable consequences of a final conflict."

As a result, the party was split with only David Trimble and Glenn Barr backing Craig and the other eleven convention members challenging Craig's leadership. Craig however claimed that he had the backing of the party's rank and file and this was confirmed when sixty percent of party members backed him at a specially convened meeting. The dissidents then broke away to form what would later become the United Ulster Unionist Party.

On 8 September 1975, Craig's proposals were decisively rejected at a meeting of the UUUC with 37 votes against and only Craig voting in favour. Consequently, Craig and the rump of VUPP were expelled from the UUUC.

== Decline and disbandment ==
The 1977 local elections were overshadowed by the abortive United Unionist Action Council (UUAC) Strike, which was mainly supported by the DUP and the UUUM. In contrast to 1974, when they had played a prominent role in the previous strike Vanguard criticised the strike and together with the UUP and Orange Order, called for it to be abandoned.

The 1977 council elections were seen as a crucial test of Vanguard's ability to survive as a party and ultimately the party failed that test. Although thirteen councillors elected in 1973 stood as VUPP candidates, the party emerged from the election with only five councillors compared to twelve councillors elected in 1977 for their breakaway rival, the UUUP.

Craig then applied to rejoin the UUP in February 1978 and subsequently merged the remainder of Vanguard back into the Ulster Unionist Party, where it returned to its origins as a pressure group within the UUP as the Vanguard movement, although this too seems to have quickly faded away. The Democratic Unionist Party subsequently became the main Unionist party offering a more right wing alternative position to the Ulster Unionists. In the 1982 elections for the new Northern Ireland Assembly, Craig, who had once more left the Ulster Unionists after losing his seat at Westminster, revived the name Vanguard for his candidacy in East Belfast. However he failed to get elected. Craig's revived Vanguard was reportedly still in existence at the time of signing of the 1985 Anglo-Irish Agreement.

== Prominent UUP members in Vanguard ==
Several prominent current Ulster Unionist politicians were members of Vanguard, including future UUP MP David Burnside (who was Vanguard's press officer from 1974 to 1977) while those elected for VUPP in 1975 included future UUP leaders David Trimble (who briefly served as Vanguard Deputy Leader) and Reg Empey, who served as Vanguard chairman from 1974 to 1975. Former deputy speaker of the Northern Ireland Assembly, Jim Wilson, served as a Vanguard councillor on Newtownabbey Borough Council from 1975 to 1976 before joining the UUP Rev. Martin Smyth, later a UUP MP and Grand Master of the Orange Order, was deputy leader of the Vanguard movement but declined to join the party.

== Notes ==
1. After 1973, the office of Prime Minister of Northern Ireland was abolished. When devolution was restored in 1998, the offices of First Minister and deputy First Minister were created instead.
- The number of Vanguard councillors elected in 1973 is a matter of some dispute among the various sources, as Whyte notes: "There is huge potential for confusion among the various candidate designations." As a minimum, James Knight, writing closest to the time, counted eight councillors. CAIN counts nine Vanguard councillors, counting an additional councillor in Ards. Whyte counts ten, ignoring the councillor in Ards but counting two additional councillors in Craigavon who he says were described as Vanguard councillors on the ballot paper.

However, in addition to the eleven above, a further thirteen councillors elected in 1973 (usually under a 'loyalist' label) contested the 1977 local elections either for Vanguard or for their splinter party, the United Ulster Unionist Party. This includes seven councillors elected as loyalists in 1973 who ran as VUPP candidates in 1977, namely Seymour, Armstrong, Semple and Stewart (Larne); Green and Mary O'Fee (North Down); and Glenn Barr (Londonderry). A further four sitting councillors elected as Loyalists stood as UUUP candidates in 1977, namely McKeever (Larne), Ritchie (Carrickfergus), Scott (Castlereagh) and Parke (Cookstown). Ben Horan, elected as a 'Unionist' in Belfast in 1973, announced two days after the election in the local press that he would sit as a VUPP councillor although he stood in 1977 as a UUUP candidate. Finally, Randall Crawford, elected in Coleraine in 1973 and 1977 as a non-party candidate, stood for Londonderry in the 1975 Constitutional convention election as a VUPP candidate.

A further councillor, Mrs M. Corrie, elected in Castlereagh as a United Loyalist, is described in contemporary press reports as a Vanguard councillor, but did not contest the 1977 local elections.
