= 1973 Northern Ireland Assembly election =

- 28 June 1973

All 78 seats to the Northern Ireland Assembly 40 seats were needed for a majority
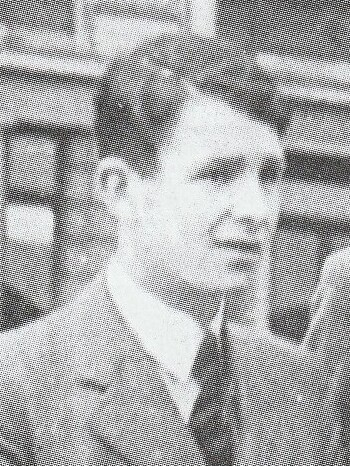

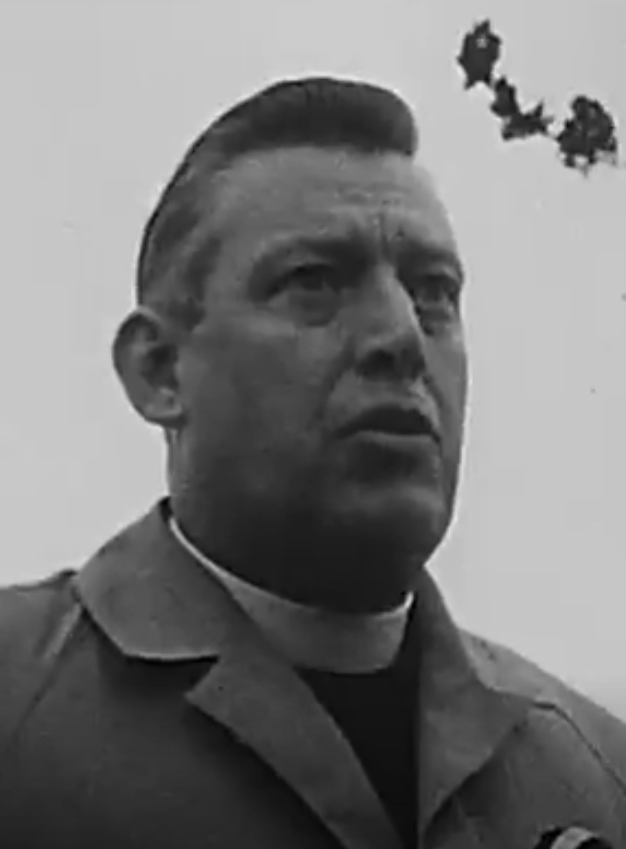
	First party	Second party	Third party
Leader	Brian Faulkner	Gerry Fitt	Ian Paisley
Party	UUP	SDLP	DUP
Leader since	23 March 1971	21 August 1970	30 September 1971
Leader's seat	South Down	Belfast North	North Antrim
Seats won	31 (Note: Pro-White Paper (24 members) Anti-White Paper (7 members))	19	8
Popular vote	258,790	159,773	78,228
Percentage	35.8%	22.1%	10.8%
	Fourth party	Fifth party
Leader	Oliver Napier	William Craig
Party	Alliance	Vanguard
Leader since	1972	9 February 1972
Leader's seat	Belfast East	North Antrim
Seats won	8	7
Popular vote	66,541	75,709
Percentage	9.2%	10.5%
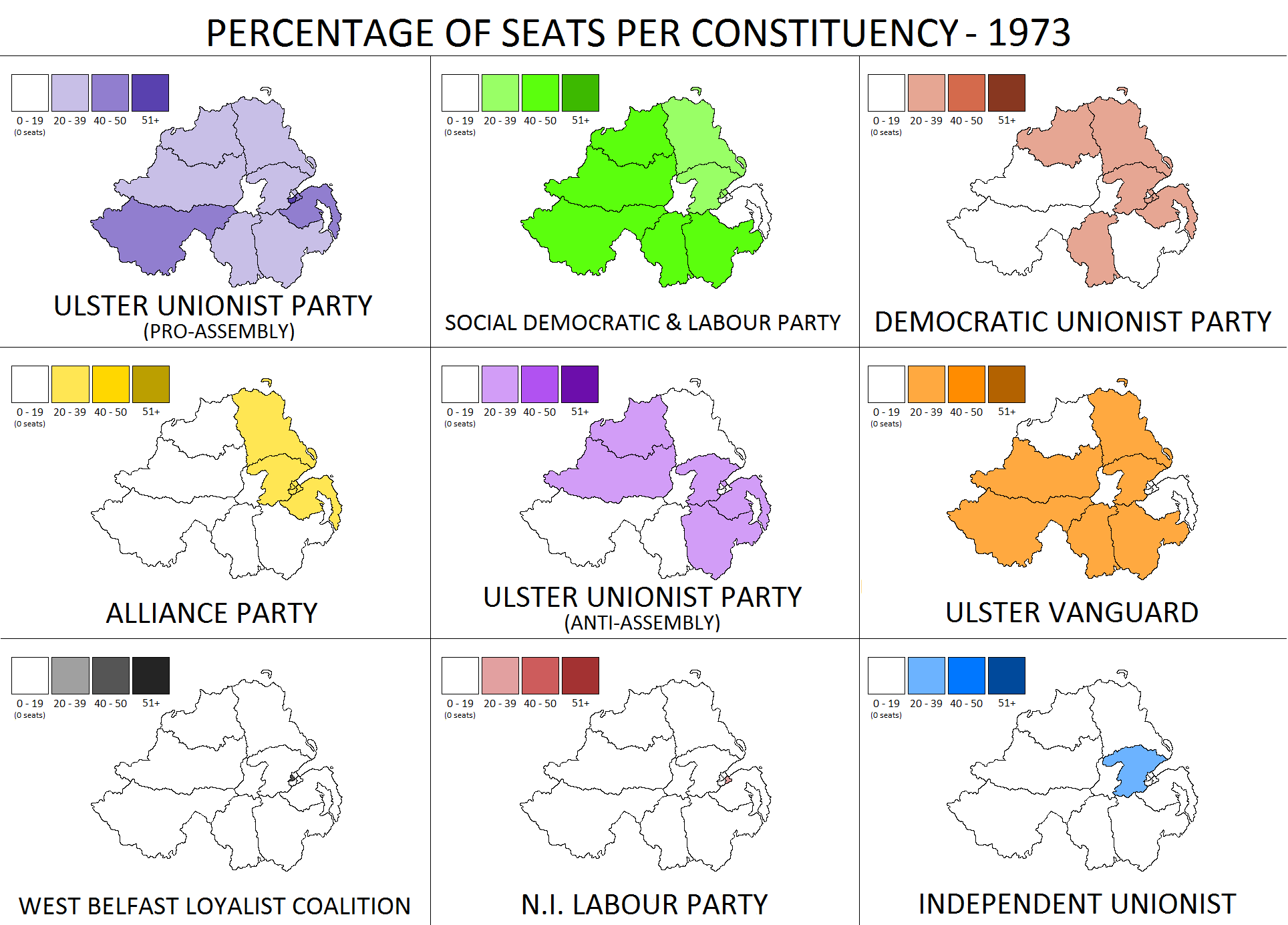
- Percentage of seats gained by each of the parties
Chief Executive before election
Brian Faulkner as Prime Minister of Northern Ireland
Chief Executive after election
Brian Faulkner

The 1973 elections to the Northern Ireland Assembly took place following the publication of the British government's white paper Northern Ireland Constitutional Proposals which proposed a 78-member Northern Ireland Assembly, elected by proportional representation. The proposals for a Northern Ireland Assembly contained in the White Paper were put into effect through the Northern Ireland Assembly Act 1973 in May 1973.

A cross-community coalition of the Ulster Unionist Party (UUP) under Brian Faulkner, the Social Democratic and Labour Party (SDLP) and the Alliance Party of Northern Ireland was agreed in November, and following the Sunningdale Agreement, a Power Sharing Executive was established from 1 January 1974. After opposition from within the UUP and the Ulster Workers Council Strike, the executive and assembly collapsed in May 1974.

== Electoral system ==
This election used single transferable voting, in 12 multi-member districts. Westminster ridings were used as Assembly districts with each district electing between 5 and 8 members each.

== Result ==
The election results were:

Party	Votes	Vote %	Seats	Seats %
Ulster Unionist Party	258,790	35.8	31	39.8
SDLP	159,773	22.1	19	24.4
DUP	78,228	10.8	8	10.3
Vanguard	75,709	10.5	7	9.0
Alliance	66,541	9.2	8	10.3
NI Labour	18,675	2.6	1	1.3
West Belfast Loyalist Coalition	16,869	2.3	3	3.8
Ind. Unionist	13,755	1.9	1	1.3
Republican Clubs	13,064	1.8	0	—
Nationalist	6,270	0.9	0	—
Independent	4,091	0.6	0	—
Loyalist	2,752	0.4	0	—
Independent pro-White Paper	2,008	0.3	0	—
Ind. Nationalist	2,000	0.3	0	—
Republican Labour	1,750	0.2	0	—
Ulster Liberal	811	0.1	0	—
National Front	591	0.1	0	—
Ulster Constitution	202	0.0	0	—
Independent Loyalist	189	0.0	0	—
Communist	123	0.0	0	—
Total	722,151	100.0	78	100.0

All parties listed.

↓
31	19	8	8	7	3	1	1
UUP	SDLP	DUP	APNI	Vanguard

== Votes summary ==
Popular vote
Ulster Unionist	35.8%
SDLP	22.1%
Democratic Unionist	10.8%
Vanguard	10.5%
Alliance	9.2%
NI Labour	2.6%
West Belfast Loyalist	2.3%
Independent Unionist	1.9%
Republican Clubs	1.8%
Nationalist	0.9%
Independent	0.6%
Other	1.5%

== Seats summary ==
Parliamentary seats
Ulster Unionist	39.8%
SDLP	24.4%
Democratic Unionist	10.3%
Alliance	10.3%
Vanguard	9.0%
West Belfast Loyalist	3.8%
NI Labour	1.3%
Independent Unionist	1.3%

== See also ==
- Members of the Northern Ireland Assembly elected in 1973

== Sources ==
- https://www.ark.ac.uk/elections/fa73.htm
