= Northern Ireland Assembly (1973) =

Legislature of Northern Ireland 1973–1974

- Devolved Assembly

Type
- Type: Unicameral

History
- Established: 3 May 1973
- Disbanded: 28 May 1974 (ceased to function), 28 March 1975 (formally dissolved)
- Preceded by: Parliament of Northern Ireland
- Succeeded by: Northern Ireland Constitutional Convention

Elections
- Voting system: STV

Meeting place
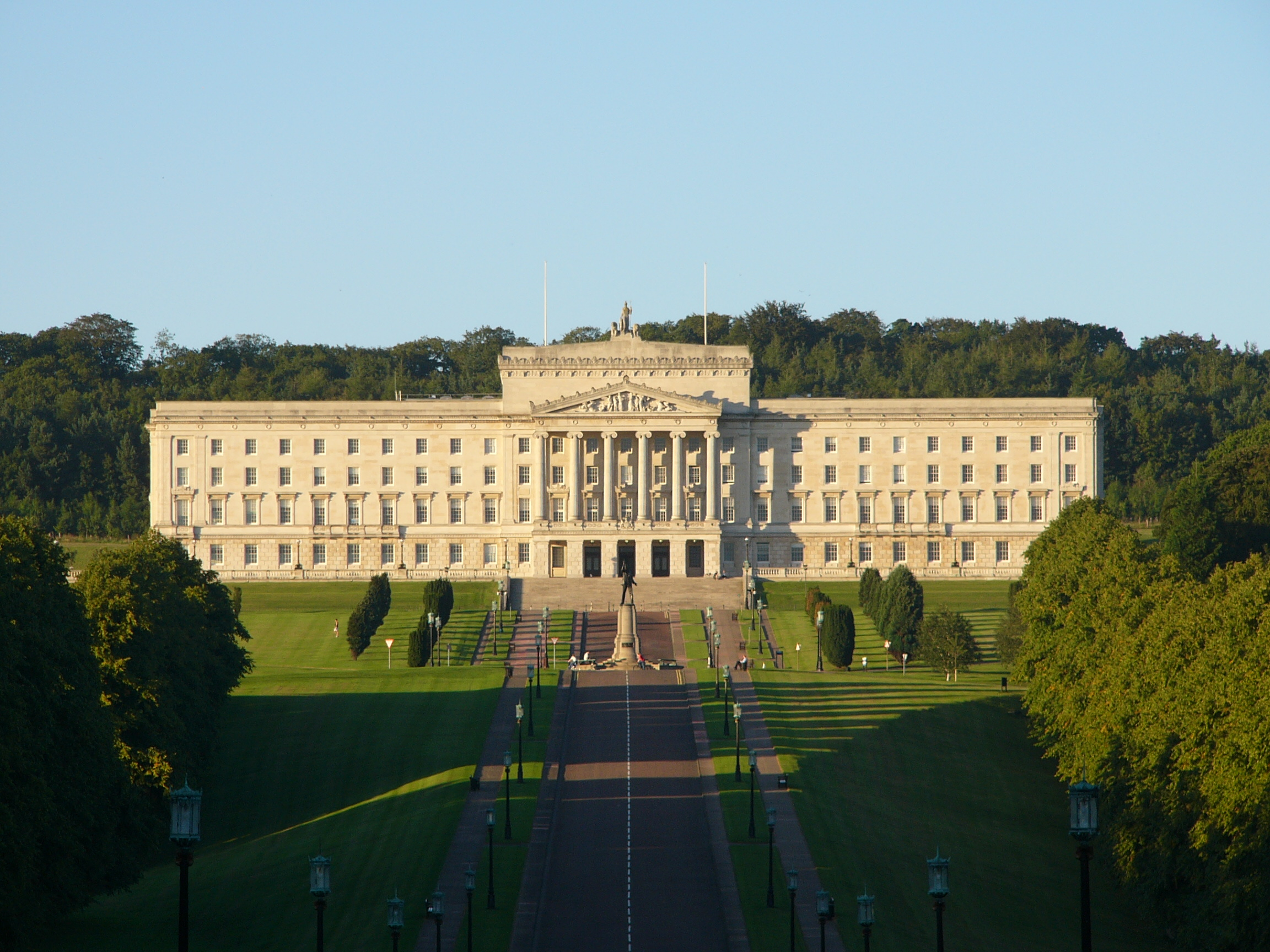
- Parliament Buildings, Stormont, Belfast

The Northern Ireland Assembly was a legislative assembly set up by the Government of the United Kingdom on 3 May 1973 to restore devolved government to Northern Ireland with the power-sharing Northern Ireland Executive made up of unionists and nationalists. It was dissolved in March 1975.

== History ==
Northern Ireland Assembly Act 1973 (Note: Section 5(1).)
- Act of Parliament
- Parliament of the United Kingdom
- Long title: An Act to establish a Northern Ireland Assembly and to provide for election to that Assembly.
- Citation: 1973 c. 17
- Territorial extent: United Kingdom

Dates
- Royal assent: 3 May 1973
- Commencement: 3 May 1973 (Note: The Acts of Parliament (Commencement) Act 1793.)
- Repealed: 2 December 1999 (Note: The Northern Ireland Act 1998 (Commencement No. 5) Order 1999 (SI 1999/3209).)

Other legislation
- Amended by: Northern Ireland Constitution Act 1973; Northern Ireland Assembly Disqualification Act 1975; Northern Ireland Act 1982; Elected Authorities (Northern Ireland) Act 1989; Parliamentary Constituencies (Northern Ireland) Order 1995
- Repealed by: Northern Ireland Act 1998

Status: Repealed

Text of statute as originally enacted

Revised text of statute as amended

Text of the Northern Ireland Assembly Act 1973 as in force today (including any amendments) within the United Kingdom, from legislation.gov.uk.

The Assembly was created by section 1 of the Northern Ireland Assembly Act 1973 (c. 17). Elections were held on 28 June 1973. The Northern Ireland Constitution Act 1973, which received royal assent on 18 July 1973, abolished the suspended Parliament of Northern Ireland and the post of Governor and made provision for a devolved administration consisting of an Executive chosen by the Assembly. 108 members were elected by Single Transferable Vote from Northern Ireland's 12 Westminster constituencies, with 5 to 8 seats for each depending on its population.

The Assembly met for the first time on 31 July 1973. It elected Nat Minford as its speaker in a chaotic first session. Following the Sunningdale Agreement, a power-sharing Executive was established from 1 January 1974. After opposition from within the Ulster Unionist Party (UUP) and the Ulster Workers' Council strike over the proposal of an all Ireland council, the Executive and Assembly collapsed on 28 May 1974 when Brian Faulkner resigned as Chief Executive. The Assembly was prorogued the following day, but continued to exist in abeyance until formally dissolved on 28 March 1975, via an Order in Council made under the Northern Ireland Act 1974.

== Members of the Northern Ireland Executive (1974) ==
Office	Name	Term	Party
Chief Executive	Brian Faulkner	1974	UUP
Deputy Chief Executive	Gerry Fitt	1974	SDLP
Minister of Agriculture	Leslie Morrell	1974	UUP
Minister of Commerce	John Hume	1974	SDLP
Minister of Education	Basil McIvor	1974	UUP
Minister of the Environment	Roy Bradford	1974	UUP
Minister of Finance	Herbert Kirk	1974	UUP
Minister of Health and Social Services	Paddy Devlin	1974	SDLP
Minister of Housing, Local Government and Planning	Austin Currie	1974	SDLP
Minister of Information	John Baxter	1974	UUP
Legal Minister and Head of the Office of Law Reform	Oliver Napier	1974	Alliance

== Legislation passed ==
The Assembly had powers to pass primary legislation known as Assembly Measures. Four such measures were passed by the assembly:

Short title	Citation	Royal assent
Long title
Consolidated Fund Measure (Northern Ireland) 1974	1974 c. 1 (N.I.)	26 March 1974
A Measure to apply certain sums out of the Consolidated Fund to the service of the years ending on 31st March 1974 and 31st March 1975.
Financial Provisions Measure (Northern Ireland) 1974	1974 c. 2 (N.I.)	26 March 1974
A Measure to increase the limits on sums which may be issued out of the Consolidated Fund for certain purposes; to authorise the issue of a sum to the Ulster Land Fund; to make further provision with respect to rate rebates; and for purposes connected with those matters.
Electricity and Gas Undertakings (Financial Provisions) Measure (Northern Ireland) 1974	1974 c. 3 (N.I.)	26 March 1974
A Measure to make provision for compensating the Northern Ireland Electricity Service and certain gas undertakings in respect of financial loss due to compliance with the national policy relating to limitation of prices or with certain agreements to the like effect and for purposes connected therewith.
National Insurance Measure (Northern Ireland) 1974	1974 c. 4 (N.I.)	21 May 1974
A Measure to amend the provisions of the National Insurance Acts (Northern Ireland) 1966 to 1973, the National Insurance (Industrial Injuries) Acts (Northern Ireland) 1966 to 1973 and the Workmen's Compensation (Supplementation) Acts (Northern Ireland) 1966 to 1973 as to the rate or amount of benefit and contributions; to make supplementary provisions, and minor amendments of certain enactments, relating to social security; and for purposes connected with those matters.

== See also ==
- Northern Ireland Constitution Act 1973
- Northern Ireland Executive (1974)
- Members of the Northern Ireland Assembly elected in 1973
- 1973 Northern Ireland Assembly election
