= Northern Ireland Constitutional Convention =

Type
- Type: Unicameral

History
- Established: 1 May 1975
- Disbanded: 6 March 1976
- Preceded by: Northern Ireland Assembly (1973)
- Succeeded by: Northern Ireland Assembly (1982)
- Seats: 78

Elections
- Voting system: STV

The Northern Ireland Constitutional Convention (NICC) was an elected body set up in 1975 by the United Kingdom Labour government of Harold Wilson as an attempt to deal with constitutional issues surrounding the status of Northern Ireland.

== Formation of the Constitutional Convention ==
The idea for a constitutional convention was first mooted by the Northern Ireland Office in its white paper The Northern Ireland Constitution, published on 4 July 1974. The paper laid out plans for elections to a body which would seek agreement on a political settlement for Northern Ireland. The proposals became law with the enactment of the Northern Ireland Act 1974 later that month. With Lord Chief Justice Robert Lowry appointed to chair the new body, elections were announced for 1 May 1975.

The elections were held for the 78-member body using the single transferable vote system of proportional representation in each of Northern Ireland's twelve Westminster constituencies. Initially the body was intended to be purely consultative, although it was hoped that executive and legislative functions could be devolved to the NICC once a cross-community agreement had been reached.

== Election results ==
Northern Ireland Constitutional Convention
- 1 May 1975

All 78 seats to the Northern Ireland Constitutional Convention 40 seats were needed for a majority
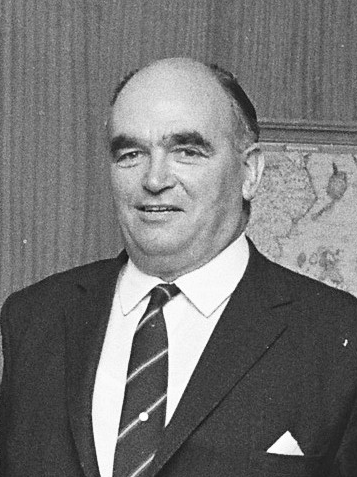

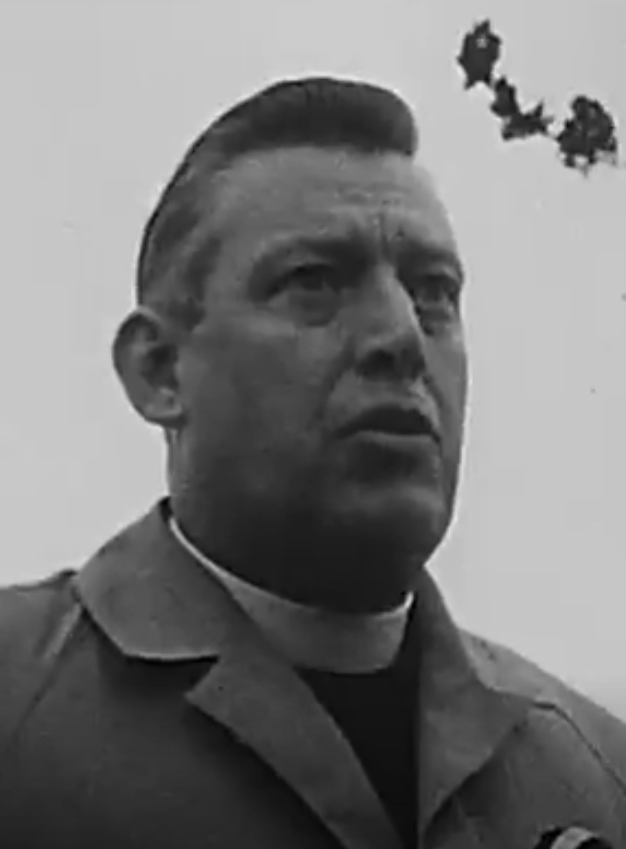

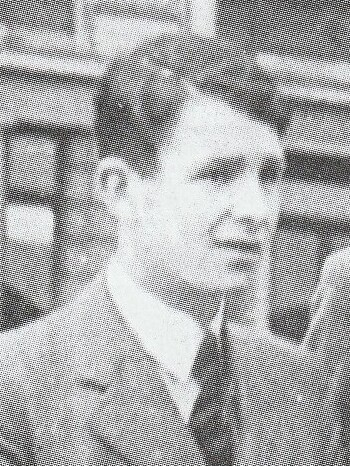
	First party	Second party	Third party
		SDL	Van
Leader	Harry West	Gerry Fitt	William Craig
Party	UUP	SDLP	Vanguard
Alliance	UUUC		UUUC
Leader since	22 January 1974	21 August 1970	9 February 1972
Leader's seat	Fermanagh and South Tyrone	Belfast North	Belfast East
Last election	31 seats, 35.8%	19 seats, 22.1%	7 seats, 11.5%
Seats won	19	17	14
Seat change	▼12	▼2	▲7
Popular vote	167,214	156,049	83,507
Percentage	25.4%	23.7%	12.7%
Swing	▼10.4%	▲1.6%	▲1.2%
	Fourth party	Fifth party	Sixth party
		APN
Leader	Ian Paisley	Oliver Napier	Brian Faulkner
Party	DUP	Alliance	Unionist Party NI
Alliance	UUUC
Leader since	September 1971	1972	September 1974
Leader's seat	North Antrim	Belfast East	South Down
Last election	8 seats, 10.8%	8 seats, 9.2%	Did not stand
Seats won	12	8	5
Seat change	▲4	Steady	▲5
Popular vote	97,073	64,657	50,891
Percentage	14.8%	9.8%	7.7%
Swing	▲4.0%	▲0.6%	n/a
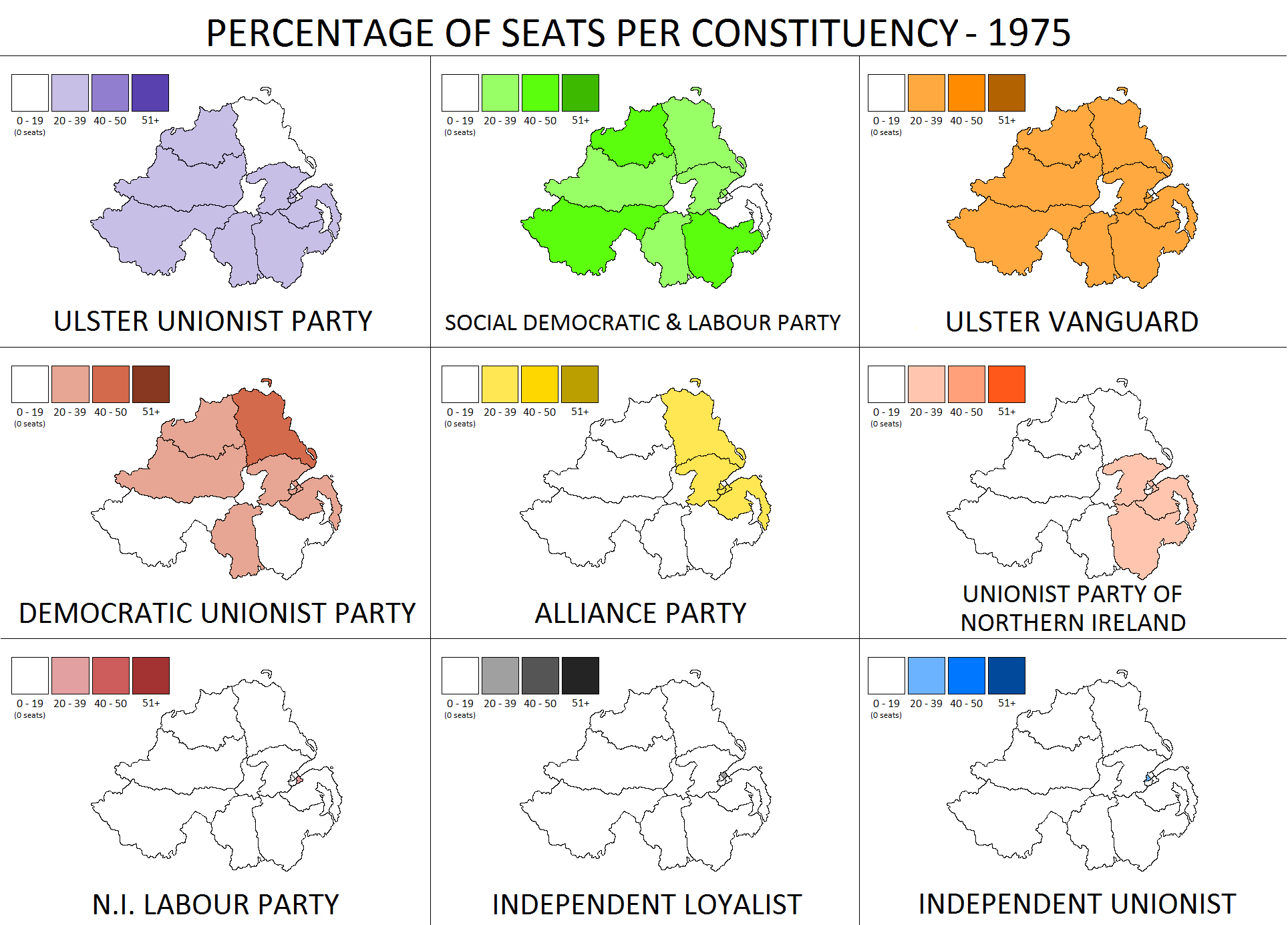
- Percentage of seats gained by each of the party.
Chief Executive before election
Brian Faulkner
Chief Executive after election
None

Unionists opposed to the NICC once again banded together under the umbrella of the United Ulster Unionist Council (UUUC) and this coalition proved the most successful, taking 46 seats.

Party	Votes	%	+/-	Seats	%	+/-
United Ulster Unionist Council (UUUC)
UUP	167,214	25.4	-10.4	19	24.4	-12
DUP	97,073	14.8	+4.0	12	15.4	+4
Vanguard	83,507	12.7	+1.2	14	17.9	+7
Ind. Loyalist (UUUC)	5,687	0.9	N/A	1	1.3	+1
Total UUUC	353,481	53.8	-4.3	46	59.0	0
Non-UUUC
SDLP	156,049	23.7	+1.6	17	21.8	-2
Alliance	64,657	9.8	+0.6	8	10.3	0
Unionist Party NI	50,891	7.7	N/A	5	6.4	+5
Republican Clubs	14,515	2.2	+0.4	0	0.0	0
NI Labour	9,102	1.4	-1.2	1	1.3	0
Ind. Unionist	4,453	0.6	-1.3	1	1.3	0
UUP (non-UUUC)	2,583	0.4	N/A	0	0.0	0
Independent	2,052	0.3	-0.3	0	0.0	0
Communist	378	0.1	+0.1	0	0.0	0
Total	658,161			78		

Black Circles indicate Members of the United Ulster Unionist Council (UUUC)

↓
19	17	14	12	8	5	3
UUP	SDLP	Vanguard	DUP	APNI	UPNI	Oth

Source: Northern Ireland Constitutional Convention Elections 1975

=== Votes summary ===
Popular vote
Ulster Unionist	25.4%
SDLP	23.7%
DUP	14.8%
Vanguard	12.7%
Alliance	9.8%
Unionist Party NI	7.7%
Republican Clubs	2.2%
NI Labour	1.4%
Ind. Loyalist (UUUC)	0.9%
Other	1.4%

=== Seats summary ===
Parliamentary seats
Ulster Unionist	24.4%
SDLP	21.8%
Vanguard	17.9%
DUP	15.4%
Alliance	10.3%
Unionist Party NI	6.4%
NI Labour	1.3%
Ind. Loyalist (UUUC)	1.3%
Ind. Unionist	1.3%

== Leading members ==
A number of leading Northern Ireland politicians were elected to the NICC, increasing hope that the body might achieve some of its aims. Also elected were some younger figures who went on to become leading figures in the future of Northern Ireland politics. These included:

- Glenn Barr – VUPP
- Lord Brookeborough – UPNI
- William Craig – VUPP
- Austin Currie – SDLP
- Reg Empey – VUPP
- Brian Faulkner – UPNI
- Gerry Fitt – SDLP
- John Hume – SDLP
- James Kilfedder – UUP
- Seamus Mallon – SDLP
- Oliver Napier – APNI
- Ian Paisley – DUP
- Martin Smyth – UUP
- John Taylor – UUP
- David Trimble – VUPP
- Harry West – UUP

== Progress of the NICC ==
The elections left the body fundamentally weakened from its inception as an overall majority had been obtained by those Unionists who opposed power sharing as a concept. As a result, the Northern Ireland Constitutional Convention Report published on 20 November 1975 recommended only a return to majority rule as had previously existed under the old Parliament of Northern Ireland government. As such a solution was completely unacceptable to the nationalist parties, the NICC was placed on hiatus. The NICC report in its conclusion said of mandatory power-sharing with a role for the SDLP in a devolved government:

...no country ought to be forced to have in its Cabinet any person whose political philosophy and attitudes have revealed his opposition to the very existence of that State.

Hoping to gain something from the exercise, Secretary of State for Northern Ireland Merlyn Rees announced that the NICC would be reconvened on 3 February 1976. However, a series of meetings held between the UUUC and the SDLP failed to reach any agreement about SDLP participation in government, and so the reconvened NICC once again failed to achieve a solution with cross-community support. As a result, Rees announced the dissolution of the body on 4 March 1976 effective two days later, and Northern Ireland remained under direct rule. The relevant parts of the Northern Ireland Act 1974 governing the creation and operation of the Convention were subsequently repealed by the Northern Ireland Act 1982.

== Significance of the NICC ==
On the face of it, the NICC was a total failure as it did not achieve its aims of agreement between the two sides or of introducing 'rolling devolution' (gradual introduction of devolution as and when the parties involved saw fit to accept it). Nevertheless, coming as it did not long after the Conservative-sponsored Sunningdale Agreement, the NICC indicated that no British government would be prepared to re-introduce majority rule in Northern Ireland. During the debates William Craig accepted the possibility of power-sharing with the SDLP, a move that split the UUUC and precipitated the eventual collapse of Vanguard.

The idea of electing a consultative body to thrash out a deal for devolution was also retained and in 1996 it was revived when the Northern Ireland Forum was elected on largely the same lines and with the same overall purpose. The Forum formed part of a process that led to the Good Friday Agreement and the Northern Ireland Assembly.
