= Stronge =

Stronge may refer to:

- Abel Nathaniel Bankole Stronge (born in Freetown, Sierra Leone) is the current speaker of Parliament of Sierra Leone
- Francis Stronge KCMG (1856–1924), senior British diplomat and the second son of Sir John Calvert Stronge and Lady Margaret Stronge
- James Stronge (Mid-Armagh MP) (1932–1981), soldier and Unionist MP in the Parliament of Northern Ireland, and the later Northern Ireland Assembly
- Norman Stronge, MC, PC (NI), JP (1894–1981), senior Unionist politician in Northern Ireland

== See also ==
- Stronge Baronets, Northern Irish landowners of Tynan Abbey, County Armagh, and Lizard Manor, Aghadowey, County Londonderry
- Sir James Stronge, 1st Baronet (1750–1804)
- Sir James Stronge, 3rd Baronet DL, JP (1811–1885)
- Sir James Stronge, 5th Baronet (1849–1928)
