= James Stronge =

James Stronge is the name of:

- Several of the Stronge baronets including:
  - Rev. Sir James Stronge, 1st Baronet (1750–1804)
  - Sir James Stronge, 3rd Baronet (1811–1885), MP for County Armagh 1864–74
  - Sir James Stronge, 5th Baronet (1849–1928)
- James Stronge (Mid-Armagh MP) (1932–1981)

== See also ==
- James Strong (disambiguation)
