= Shillington =

Shillington may refer to:

== Places ==
- Shillington, Bedfordshire in the United Kingdom
- Shillington, Pennsylvania in the United States

== People with the surname ==
- Clare Shillington (born 1981), Irish women's cricketer
- David Shillington, Australian rugby league footballer
- David Shillington (politician), member of the Privy Council of Northern Ireland
- Geoffrey St. George Shillington Cather, an Irish recipient of the Victoria Cross
- Graham Shillington, chief officer of the Royal Ulster Constabulary (1970-1973)
- Ned Shillington, Canadian politician
- Robert Taylor Shillington, Canadian politician, mining owner and ice hockey executive
- Thomas Shillington (1835-1925), member of the Privy Council of Northern Ireland
