= Tynan =

Village in County Armagh, Northern Ireland

Coordinates: 54.3301°N 6.8226°W

Tynan: Irish: Tuíneán
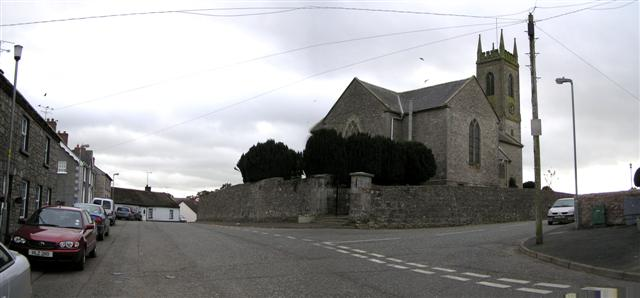
- St Vindic's (Church of Ireland) Church on Tynan's main street

- Location within Northern Ireland
- Population: 71 (2011 Census)
- District: Armagh City, Banbridge and Craigavon
- County: County Armagh
- Country: Northern Ireland
- Sovereign state: United Kingdom
- Postcode district: BT60
- Dialling code: 028
- UK Parliament: Newry & Armagh
- NI Assembly: Newry & Armagh

Tynan (from Irish Tuíneán, meaning 'watercourse') is a village, townland (of 375 acres) and civil parish in County Armagh, Northern Ireland. The village, which is around 11 kilometres (7 mi) west of Armagh City, had a population of 71 people (35 households) as of the 2011 census.

== Geography ==
The village and townland of Tynan lie in a civil parish of the same name. The civil parish of Tynan contains the villages of Killylea, Middletown and Tynan. It is situated largely in the historic barony of Tiranny, with some areas in the barony of Armagh,

== History ==
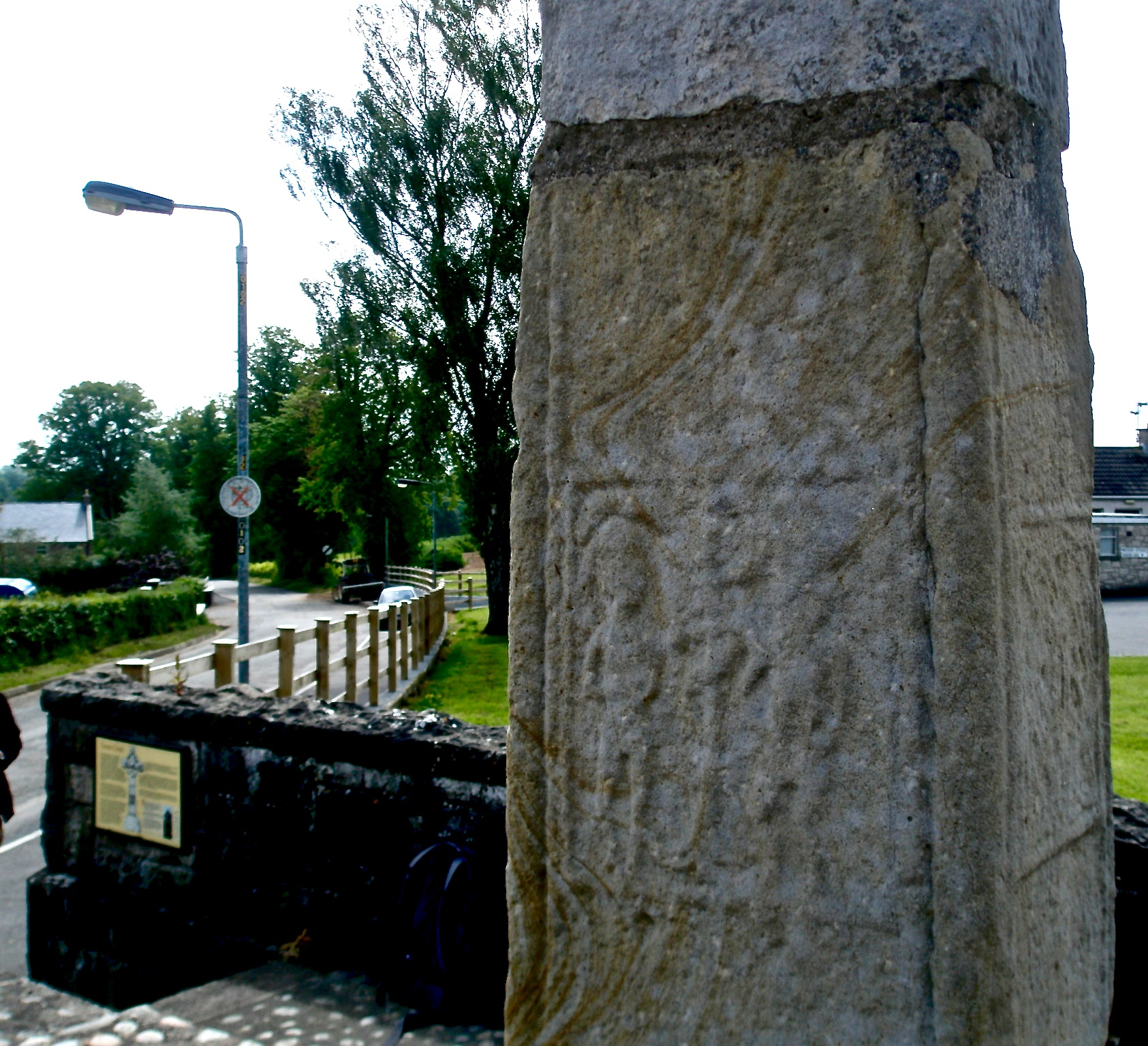
Adam & Eve under a tree.

Tynan has a High cross in the village's church yard, dating from 700 to 900. On its east face it shows a carving of Adam and Eve under an apple tree.

Tynan Abbey, an 18th-century country house with an extensive demesne that belonged to the Stronge family, was situated near Tynan until it was destroyed by the Provisional IRA in 1981. The ruins have since been demolished. The grounds hold an extensive cemetery with grave stones going back centuries and others worn beyond recognition.

Tynan won the status as the most well-preserved rural Irish village in 1993.

=== The Troubles ===
Incidents that occurred in the area, during The Troubles, include the killing of Sir Norman Stronge, 8th Baronet on 21 January 1981. Stronge (aged 86), who was an Ulster Unionist Party member and former Speaker at Stormont, was shot dead, along with his son, James Stronge (48) and an off-duty member of the Royal Ulster Constabulary reserve, by the Provisional Irish Republican Army (IRA) at their mansion at Tynan Abbey.

== Transport ==
The Ulster Railway opened the station on 25 May 1858 as Tynan, Caledon & Midleton. In 1876 the Ulster Railway merged with other railways to become the Great Northern Railway (Ireland).

Tynan was formerly served by mainline trains of the Great Northern Railway (Ireland) and was also the eastern terminus of the narrow gauge Clogher Valley Railway. Tynan railway station on the Clogher Valley railway opened on 2 May 1887 and shut 1 January 1942. Tynan and Caledon railway station on the mainline opened on 25 May 1858 and shut on 1 October 1957.

== People ==
- Peter McManus, recipient of the Victoria Cross.
- William Reeves, a 19th-century antiquarian, was the Church of Ireland rector of Tynan in the 1860s.

== See also ==
- List of civil parishes of County Armagh
- The Tynan Crucifixion Plaque
