= John Henry Collins =

Member of the Northern Ireland Parliament for South Down
- In office May 1929 – November 1933
- Preceded by: Constituency created
- Succeeded by: Éamon de Valera

Member of the Northern Ireland Parliament for Armagh
- In office April 1925 – May 1929

Personal details
- Born: 3 March 1880; Newry, County Armagh, Ireland
- Died: 12 January 1952 (aged 71)
- Political party: Nationalist Party

John Henry Collins (3 March 1880 – 12 January 1952) was a nationalist politician and solicitor in Northern Ireland.

Born in Newry, he was educated at the Christian Brothers School, Newry, and Queen's University Belfast.

At the 1925 general election, he was elected to the Parliament of Northern Ireland for County Armagh, and then from 1929 to 1933 for South Down. He did not take his seat until 2 November 1927. He did not contest the 1933 election.

Parliament of Northern Ireland
Preceded by Richard Best; Michael Collins; David Graham Shillington; John Dillon Nugent	Member of Parliament for Armagh; 1925–1929; With: David Graham Shillington; Eamon Donnelly; Richard Best; John Clarke Davison	Constituency abolished
New constituency	Member of Parliament for South Down; 1929–1933	Succeeded by Éamon de Valera
