= John Clarke Davison =

Northern Ireland politician

John Clarke Davison (19 April 1875 – 19 February 1946) was a barrister and Unionist politician in Northern Ireland.

Davison was educated at Coleraine Academical Institution and Trinity College, Dublin and was called to the Irish Bar in 1898. He was a legal adviser to the Government of Northern Ireland from 1922 to 1925, and Senior Crown Prosecutor for County Louth and County Antrim. In 1925, he was elected in a by-election as a Unionist to the Parliament of Northern Ireland from County Armagh, and then from 1929 from Mid-Armagh until resigning his seat shortly after the 1938 general election upon appointment as Recorder of Londonderry. Davison was an opponent of the Irish language, considering it "political propaganda" and "disloyal". He called upon the government to ban the Irish language in schools.

He was Chairman of Ways and Means and Deputy Speaker of the House of Commons from March – June 1937 and Parliamentary Secretary to the Ministry of Home Affairs from 1937 – 1938. He died on 19 February 1946.

== Notes ==
Parliament of Northern Ireland
Preceded by Richard Best; Michael Collins; David Graham Shillington; John Dillon Nugent	Member of Parliament for Armagh; 1925–1929; With: David Graham Shillington; Eamon Donnelly; John Henry Collins	Constituency abolished
New constituency	Member of Parliament for Mid-Armagh; 1929–1938	Succeeded by Norman Stronge
Political offices
Preceded by George Hanna	Parliamentary Secretary to the Ministry of Home Affairs; 1937–1938	Succeeded by Edmond Warnock
