= James Strong =

James Strong may refer to:

- James Strong (college president) (1833–1913), American theologian and the first president of Carleton College in Minnesota
- James Strong (director), British television director and writer
- James Strong (theologian) (1822–1894), American Methodist biblical scholar and educator, creator of Strong's Concordance and co-author of McClintock and Strong's Cyclopaedia
- James Strong (New York politician) (1783–1847), United States Representative from New York
- James Clark Strong (1826–1915), Union brevet brigadier general in the American Civil War
- James G. Strong (1870–1938), United States Representative from Kansas
- James Hooker Strong (1814–1882), United States Navy admiral
- James N. Strong (1818–1900), United States Army officer and Medal of Honor recipient
- James Richard Strong (1921–1998), American politician from Missouri
- Jim Strong (American football coach) (born 1954), former college football coach
- Jim Strong (running back) (born 1946), American football player
- James Strong (Australian businessman) (1944–2013), Australian businessman, CEO of Qantas
- Jimmy Strong (musician) (1906–1977), American jazz reedist

== See also ==
- James Stronge (disambiguation)
- George Strong (footballer) (1916–1989), commonly known as Jimmy Strong
