= John Dillon Nugent =

Irish politician (1869–1940)

Member of Parliament for Dublin College Green
- In office 15 July 1915 – 14 December 1918
- Preceded by: Joseph Nannetti
- Succeeded by: Seán T. O'Kelly

Personal details
- Born: 22 December 1869 Keady, County Armagh, Ireland
- Died: 1 March 1940 (aged 70)
- Party: Irish Parliamentary

John Dillon Nugent (22 December 1869 – 1 March 1940) was an Irish nationalist politician, insurance representative and company director. He was born at Keady, County Armagh, the son of grocer John Nugent and Sarah Dillon. He was educated at National Schools there. He married in August 1896 and with his wife Mary, née Nolan, had seven children.

He was the national secretary of the Ancient Order of Hibernians (AOH) from 1904 until his death. Patrick Maume described him as Joseph Devlin's 'right-hand man'. Marie Coleman in the Dictionary of Irish Biography states that he used the AOH to intimidate the Irish Party's opponents, and that he orchestrated the attacks on William O'Brien at the infamous United Irish League ‘baton convention’ of 1909.

Nugent was a member of Dublin Corporation from 1912 and a Poor Law Guardian from 1908 to 1920. He was elected as MP for the constituency of Dublin College Green at the by-election of 11 June 1915 following the death of Joseph Nannetti, defeating the Labour candidate Thomas Farren, who stood on a separatist programme, by 2445 votes to 1816. He was defeated at the 1918 general election by Michael Staines of Sinn Féin contesting Dublin St Michan's.

At the 1921 Northern Ireland general election, Nugent was elected as a Nationalist in the Armagh seat. He was defeated at the 1925 general election. Following this defeat he concentrated on his insurance and other business interests.

== Publications ==
- The AOH and its Critics, Dublin, pr. Curtis, 1911

== Works ==
- Dictionary of Irish Biography (online)
- Patrick Maume, The Long Gestation: Irish Nationalist Life 1891–1918, New York, St Martin's Press, 1999
- Brian Walker (ed.), Parliamentary Election Results in Ireland, 1801–1922, Dublin, Royal Irish Academy, 1978

Parliament of the United Kingdom
Preceded by Joseph Nannetti	Member of Parliament for Dublin College Green; 1915–1918	Succeeded by Seán T. O'Kelly
Parliament of Northern Ireland
New parliament	Member of Parliament for Armagh; 1921–1925; With: Michael Collins; David Graham Shillington; Richard Best	Succeeded by John Henry Collins; John Clarke Davison; David Graham Shillington; Eamon Donnelly
