= Thomas Shillington =

Irish politician and businessperson (1835–1925)

Thomas Shillington PC (Ire) PC (NI)
- Born: 9 May 1835
- Died: 24 January 1925
- Occupations: Factory owner; Politician
- Parent: Averell Shillington
- Relatives: David Graham Shillington (cousin)

Thomas Shillington PC (Ire) PC (NI) (9 May 1835 – 24 January 1925) was an Irish factory owner and politician.

== Early life ==
The son of Averell Shillington (1802-1897), of a prominent Methodist family of Portadown, County Armagh, by his wife Mary (d. 1838), daughter of James Whealy,

== Career ==
Shillington first came to prominence as the chairman of the Irish Land Committee on its formation in 1883, an organisation aiming to draw together numerous local tenant's rights bodies. At the 1885 general election, Shillington stood for the Liberal Party in North Armagh, but was not elected. The following year, he became the first president of the Irish Protestant Home Rule Association, a body of Liberals aiming to show that a significant number of Protestants in Northern Ireland supported Home Rule.

At the 1895 general election, Shillington stood in South Tyrone as an independent nationalist, narrowly losing to the Liberal Unionist Thomas Wallace Russell. In 1911, he was appointed to the Privy Council of Ireland, and then in 1923 to the recently founded Privy Council of Northern Ireland. These appointments entitled him to the style The Right Honourable

Shillington ran the Castleisland Linen Company for many years, and in 1897 inherited the business from his father. In 1908, he floated the company for £40,000.

== Personal life ==
By his wife, his first cousin, Sarah, daughter of Thomas Averell Shillington (1800-1874), of Tavanagh House, Portadown, he had issue including a son, Thomas Averell Shillington, who took over the Castleisland Linen Company until its liquidation in 1929. His cousin (and nephew by marriage) was the politician David Graham Shillington, father of Chief Constable of the Royal Ulster Constabulary Graham Shillington.
