= Mid Armagh =

Mid Armagh may refer to:

- The central part of County Armagh
- Mid Armagh (Northern Ireland Parliament constituency)
- Mid Armagh (UK Parliament constituency)
