= Joseph Hutchinson (disambiguation) =

Joseph Hutchinson (1902–1988) was a British biologist (1842–1924).

Joseph Hutchinson may also refer to:

- J. H. Hutchinson (Joseph H. Hutchinson, 1860–1934), Lieutenant Governor of Idaho
- Joseph Turner Hutchinson (1850–1924), Chief Justice of Ceylon
- Joseph Hutchinson (Irish politician) (1852–1928), Irish politician and Lord Mayor of Dublin

== See also ==
- Joseph Hutcheson (disambiguation)
