= 1974 British Airways bombing attempt =

IRA bombing attempt

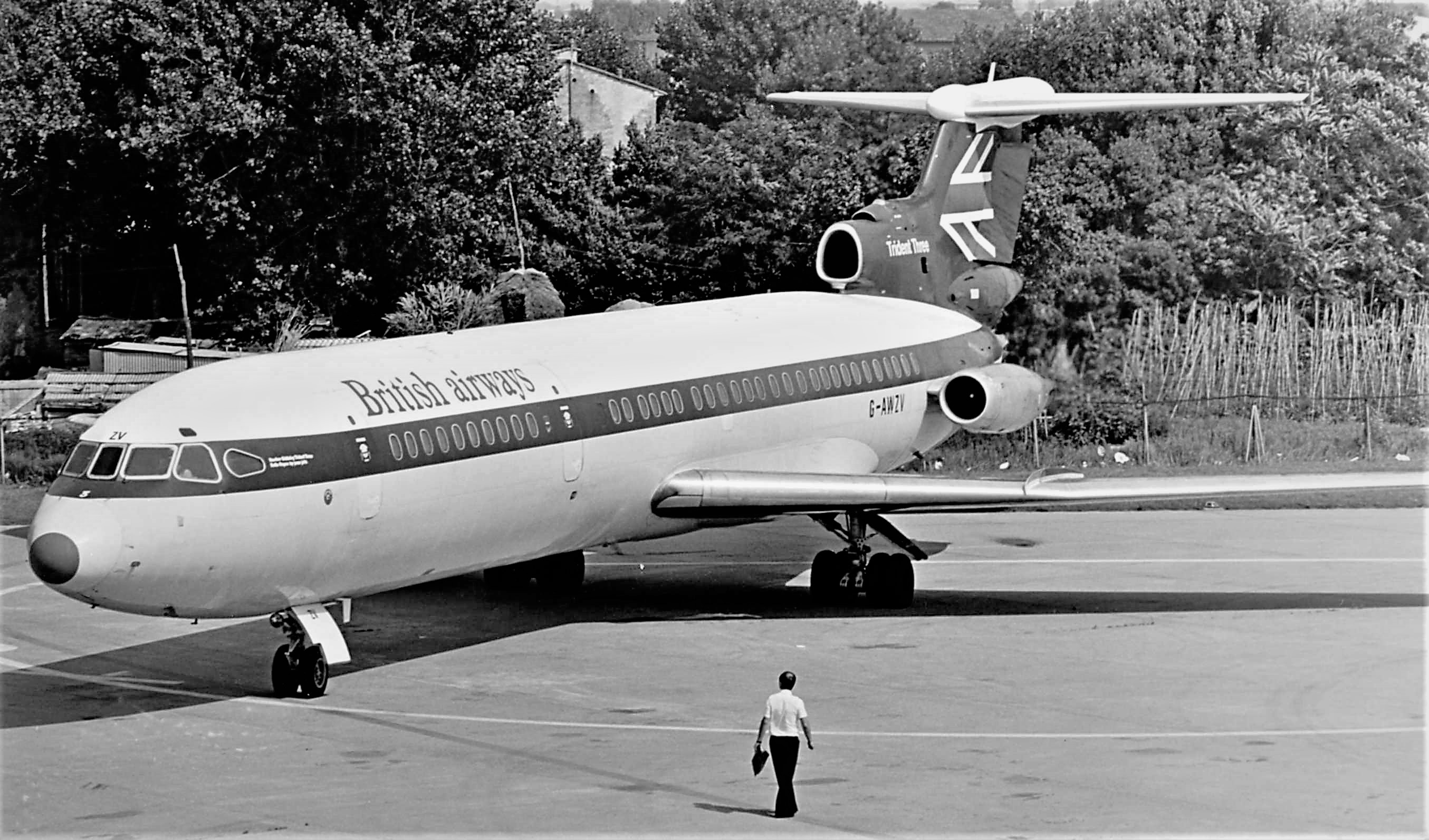
- A British Airways Hawker Siddeley Trident similar to the aircraft involved

Incident
- Date: 23 July 1974
- Summary: Attempted bombing

Aircraft
- Aircraft type: Hawker Siddeley Trident
- Operator: British Airways
- Registration: Unknown
- Flight origin: Aldergrove Airport, Antrim Town, Northern Ireland
- Destination: Heathrow Airport, Middlesex, England
- Passengers: 85
- Crew: Unknown
- Fatalities: 0
- Survivors: 85+

On 23 July 1974, a small bomb was found aboard a British Airways flight from Aldergrove Airport, near Belfast, to London, following a telephoned warning. The flight made an emergency landing at Manchester Airport. The Provisional Irish Republican Army (IRA) claimed it had planted the bomb as a symbolic act, and that it had not been set to explode. It is the only time that the IRA has planted a bomb aboard an aircraft, and was the second terrorist incident involving a bomb aboard an aircraft in the United Kingdom.

== Incident ==
The flight took off from Aldergrove Airport, near Antrim Town in County Antrim, Northern Ireland, for a domestic flight to London Heathrow Airport, England. As the flight was over the Irish Sea a phone call was made to The Irish News warning that a bomb was on board and would explode. The flight crew diverted and made an emergency landing at Manchester Airport. All 85 passengers and crew were removed from the aircraft. Police found the bomb in a plastic bag under one of the seats. The bomb had 2 kg (4.4 lb) of explosives and was removed where a controlled explosion was carried out.

Three police officers from the Royal Ulster Constabulary (RUC) were on board the flight. These included the Chief Constable of the RUC, Jamie Flanagan, together with his wife Florence, and two police officers with their families who were travelling to London to attend an investiture; the two officers were to receive the British Empire Medal from Queen Elizabeth II at Buckingham Palace for their work during the ongoing Northern Ireland conflict. Jim Molyneaux, MP, Chief Whip for the Ulster Unionist Party and a senior member of the Orange Order, was also on the flight. A young Bob Rae, who would later become Premier of the Canadian province of Ontario and leader of the Liberal Party of Canada, was also a passenger.

== Aftermath ==
The IRA claimed that they had put the bomb on the aircraft. The IRA said the bomb was not primed and was not meant to detonate, but that it had been planted as a symbolic act, to show that they could get through the security at Aldergrove Airport, near Belfast. It is unknown how the bomb made its way on board.

The British Airline Pilots' Association called for sterner security measures at Aldergrove Airport in County Antrim, such as banning hand luggage, banning cleaners from boarding the aircraft during the turn-round, and not taking on catering supplies at Aldergrove.

== See also ==
- Provisional Irish Republican Army campaign
- Timeline of Provisional Irish Republican Army actions
