= Joseph Nannetti =

Irish politician (1851–1915)

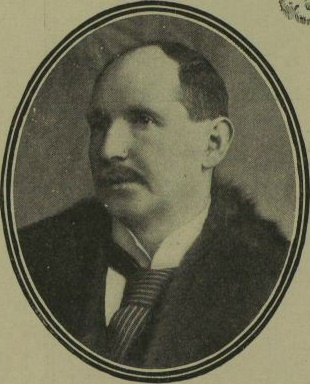
- Nannetti in 1907

Member of Parliament for Dublin College Green
- In office 24 October 1900 – 26 April 1915
- Preceded by: James Laurence Carew
- Succeeded by: John Dillon Nugent

Lord Mayor of Dublin
- In office 1906–1908
- Preceded by: Joseph Hutchinson
- Succeeded by: Gerald O'Reilly

Personal details
- Born: 19 March 1851 Dublin, Ireland
- Died: 26 April 1915 (aged 63–64) Dublin, Ireland
- Party: Irish Parliamentary
- Spouse: Mary Egan (m. 1873)

Joseph Patrick Nannetti (19 March 1851 – 26 April 1915) was an Irish nationalist Home rule politician, trade union leader, and as Irish Parliamentary Party member and Member of Parliament (MP) represented the constituency of College Green, Dublin in the House of Commons of the United Kingdom from 1900 to 1915. He was a city councillor and Lord Mayor of Dublin.

== Biography ==
Nannetti was born in Dublin in 1851 as a son of an Italian sculptor and modeller. He was educated at the Baggot Street Convent School and the Christian Brother’s schools in Dublin. He married Mary Egan in 1873.

First apprenticed to the printing trade and was afterwards employed in Liverpool, where he was one of the first founders of the Liverpool Home Rule organisation in Liverpool. Returning home, he became secretary of the Dublin Trade Council and, afterwards its President; he also led the Dublin Typographical Provident Society.

In the 1900 general election Nannetti was elected MP for the constituency of Dublin College Green as a United Irish League supported Labour trade unionist, as well as in the 1906 election, the January 1910 and the December 1910 elections which seat he held until his death in 1915, having been paralysed by illness since 1913.

Nannetti had represented an older school of trade unionism, based on skilled workmen and emphasising shared interest between workmen and employer, which was challenged by the rise of Larkinism mass unionism. With the appearance of an independent Labour candidate in the subsequent by-election it was seen as significant in the drift of labour workers away from the Irish Party.

First elected to Dublin Corporation as a councillor for the Rotunda ward in 1898, he remained a member until his death. As a member of the Corporation, Nannetti was elected Lord Mayor of Dublin in 1906, and re-elected in 1907. He was also a member of the Catholic Cemeteries Committee and Trustee of the Royal Liver Friendly Society. He appears as a character in James Joyce's novel, Ulysses.

Nannetti died following a stroke on 26 April 1915.

Political offices
New office	President of the Dublin Council of Trade Unions; 1886–1888	Succeeded by W. J. Leahy
Parliament of the United Kingdom
Preceded by James Laurence Carew	Member of Parliament for Dublin College Green; 1900–1915	Succeeded by John Dillon Nugent
Civic offices
Preceded by Joseph Hutchinson	Lord Mayor of Dublin; 1906–1908	Succeeded by Gerald O'Reilly
