= Tynan Abbey =

Coordinates: 54.331°N 6.823°W

- Interactive map of the Tynan Abbey area

General information
- Type: Country house
- Location: Northern Ireland
- Demolished: 1998

Tynan Abbey in County Armagh, Northern Ireland, was a large neo-gothic-romantic country house built c. 1750 (later renovated c. 1815) and situated outside the village of Tynan. It was home to the Stronge family until 1981, when it was set on fire by incendiary devices after the Provisional IRA shot dead Sir Norman Stronge aged 86 and his son James Stronge aged 48, a Royal Ulster Constabulary officer; its ruins were demolished in 1998, having stood for 249 years.

== History ==
The house on this site that replaced the original 13th-century abbey was called Fairview and was the home of the Manson family, it was acquired by the Stronges through the marriage of Dr. John Stronge and Elinor Manson. At this time Fairview was described by Thomas Ashe as a "very pretty house, well timbered and regularly built. It is two storeys high. There are good chambers and garrets above staires, a hansome parlour, a common Hall, a Kitchen Sellars and their Convenient Offices a Good Stable Barne and Cow house a Good Garden and Orchard". The library, in which the last of the Stronges were killed, was believed to have dated to this original house.

This was an area with a peculiar history; its 1640s, rector Robert Maxwell told pamphleteers that 154,000 Protestants had been massacred there in the 1649 Rising. That figure would have represented one tenth of the entire island of Ireland (historians put the real number of Protestants killed at somewhere between 527 and 1,259; many hundreds of Catholics were killed in reprisals by the Protestant incomers). The inflated figure was used by Oliver Cromwell as the basis for his invasion of Ireland during the English Civil War.

The building of the house called Tynan Abbey (as Fairview would become) took place under the ownership of the Stronges. By 1816 Mrs Calvert, the mother-in-law of Sir James Stronge, 1st Bt., described the house, which was under construction, as "very ugly...I don't think I shall ever like the house...I have a comfortable enough room...all the other rooms are unfinished and even without windows...the staircase without banisters and all about unfinished". By 1822 Mrs Calvert thought Tynan Abbey "very pretty and the place very nice, but somewhat exposed".

By 1838, George Petrie of the Ordnance Survey described it as a "fine specimen of bastard and vile gothic architecture." In 1855, however, Sir Bernard Burke said it has a "picturesque appearance". One hundred years after this assertion Tynan Abbey was still being pondered upon; Richard Hayward questioned its "dubious...architectural integrity, but mellowed by time, humanised by generations of affectionate occupancy."

Tynan included an octagonal stone spire and square turret (resembling a chapel), in reality this merely housed the water tanks. The castle was surrounded by an extensive estate, once amounting to over 8,000 acres (32 km²), including park-land and a lake. Although there is a wealth of Celtic crosses on the site it seems there was never an actual abbey in the vicinity.

== Royal Ulster Constabulary occupation and the Second World War ==
In 1923, part of the building was occupied by the Royal Ulster Constabulary (RUC) rent-free for protection purposes. During the Second World War, it was again occupied by British, Belgian and American troops, leaving a legacy of Nissen huts.

== Later years ==
At the time of Sir Norman Stronge's murder, The Irish Times reported that, "They [the Stronges] were completely the local big family, still living in an enormous mansion though everyone knew the father and son used only a few rooms of it, with a housekeeper and a landsteward who lived out. Neither had much interest in farming – most of the acres were let."

== Destruction ==
On 21 January 1981, 86-year-old Sir Norman Stronge, Bt., former Speaker of the House of Commons of Northern Ireland, and his only son, James Stronge, 48 (both former MPs) were murdered by the Provisional Irish Republican Army. The bodies of the father and son were later recovered from the wreckage of their home. The two men were targeted as they sat in the main library of their 230-year-old mansion. Members of the Provisional Irish Republican Army forced entry by blowing in the heavy front doors with explosives. After the murders the building itself was fire-bombed and the fire raged until the next morning, destroying all the contents of the Abbey, and the building left as a roofless ruin. Gerry Adams stated about the elder Stronge, “The only complaint I have heard from Nationalists or anti-Unionists is that he was not shot 40 years ago.” Stronge was described at the time of his death by nationalist Social Democratic and Labour Party politician Austin Currie as having been "even at 86 years of age … still incomparably more of a man than the cowardly dregs of humanity who ended his life in this barbaric way."

== Legacy ==
In 1995 the Historic Buildings Branch of the Department of the Environment (the DoE) recalled that listed building consent to partial demolition had been granted in 1983. However, the Historic Buildings Branch noted it was keen to have the "listing status retained or stabilised as a ruin. It still holds a lot of historic and architectural interest in its present state". In 1998, before the ruins of Tynan Abbey were demolished and the site levelled, a man was seriously injured in an explosion there, which may have been a booby-trap bomb.

The several thousand acres of land remained in the possession of the family of Sir Norman's eldest daughter, Mrs Daphne Marian Kingan of Glenganagh, Groomsport, Bangor, County Down, widow of Thomas John Anthony Kingan, DL, of Glenganagh, High Sheriff of County Down (1958). Daphne Kingan died on 15 January 2002 and the land was then inherited by her son, James Anthony John Kingan, an Ulster Unionist Party candidate in the elections of 1993 and 1997, and his wife, Kate, who have three children, Charlotte, Esme and Edward.

Tynan Abbey was demolished in 1998 due to the unstable structure of the ruin. All that remains is the arch of the front door surround. In September 2007, The Three Estates Walking Festival was held within the Tynan estate, along with the lands at Caledon and Castle Leslie.

== See also ==
- Abbeys and priories in Northern Ireland (County Armagh)
