= Walter Pitt-Taylor =

British Army general

General Sir Walter Pitt-Taylor KCB CMG DSO
- Pitt-Taylor in 1920
- Born: 30 August 1878; Kensington, London, England
- Died: 22 November 1950 (aged 72); Barscobe, Castle Douglas, Scotland
- Military career
- Allegiance: United Kingdom
- Branch: British Army
- Service years: 1895–1939
- Rank: General
- Commands: Western Command, India; 3rd Division; 5th Infantry Brigade; 17th Indian Infantry Brigade; 145th Infantry Brigade
- Conflicts: Second Boer War; First World War
- Awards: Knight Commander of the Order of the Bath; Companion of the Order of St Michael and St George; Distinguished Service Order

General Sir Walter William Pitt-Taylor, KCB, CMG, DSO (30 August 1878 – 22 November 1950) was a British Army officer who commanded the 3rd Infantry Division from 1932 to 1934.

== Military career ==
Pitt-Taylor was commissioned into the Army Militia as a second lieutenant in the 5th Battalion of the Rifle Brigade (The Prince Consort's Own) on 4 December 1895. He transferred to the regular army as a second lieutenant in the 1st Battalion on 18 October 1899, as the battalion was sent to South Africa to serve in the Second Boer War. They were part of the force sent to relieve Ladysmith, and as such he took part in the battles of Colenso (December 1899), Vaal Krantz and the Tugela Heights (February 1900). He was promoted to lieutenant on 1 August 1900, and served in Natal and in the Transvaal, staying in South Africa throughout the hostilities, which ended with the Peace of Vereeniging on 31 May 1902. For his service in the war, he was awarded the Distinguished Service Order (DSO).

Following the end of the war, Pitt-Taylor left Cape Town with other men of the battalion on the SS Orissa, which arrived at Southampton in late October 1902, when the battalion was stationed at Portsmouth.

Pitt-Taylor fought in the First World War, from April 1915 as a brigade major, and latterly as commander of the 145th Infantry Brigade and then as chief of staff for XIV Corps. He was promoted on 3 June 1918 to brevet colonel "for distinguished service in connection with Military Operations in Italy".

After the war he became Military Assistant to the Chief of the Imperial General Staff. He was appointed Director of Military Operations in India in 1920, commander of the 17th Indian Infantry Brigade in circa 1922 and commander of the 5th Infantry Brigade in 1925. He went on to be Director of Recruiting & Organisation at the War Office in 1929, and received a promotion on 1 January 1929 to major general.

He became General Officer Commanding 3rd Division in 1932 and General Officer Commanding-in-Chief at Western Command, India in 1936 before retiring in 1939.

== Family ==
In 1920 Pitt-Taylor married Daphne Helen Stronge, daughter of Sir James Stronge, 5th Baronet. Pitt-Taylor died on 22 November 1950 at Barscobe, Castle Douglas, Scotland, aged 72.

Military offices
Preceded by Harry Knox	General Officer Commanding the 3rd Division; 1932–1934	Succeeded by Robert Gordon-Finlayson
Preceded by Sir Ivo Vesey	GOC-in-C, Western Command, India; 1936–1938	Succeeded by Edward Quinan as GOC, Western Independent District
