= James Flanagan (police officer) =

Northern Irish police officer (1914–1999)

Sir James Bernard Flanagan, KBE (15 January 1914 – 4 April 1999) was chief constable of the Royal Ulster Constabulary (RUC), the only Catholic to hold that position.

Known as 'Jamie', he was born in Derry in Ulster, the northern province in Ireland. He was raised near Killygordon, a village in the east of County Donegal in Ulster. Flanagan was no relation of Sir Ronnie Flanagan, a later chief constable. Jamie Flanagan's father was a sergeant in the Royal Irish Constabulary (RIC).

In 1934 Jamie Flanagan joined the RUC. In 1961 he was promoted to county inspector and appointed an OBE in June 1968. In June 1970 he was appointed assistant chief constable. In July 1973 he became a CBE and was appointed chief constable on 1 November 1973, replacing Sir Graham Shillington. In July 1974 Flanagan survived an IRA bombing attempt on a plane he was travelling in.

In June 1975 Flanagan received a knighthood and retired in April 1976.

== Not a 'political' Chief ==
Although Flanagan avoided political comment, his tenure as Chief Constable was marked by controversy. The police, however, did not control security policy in regard to the Troubles during this period - which was instead decided by the Army. Some felt that the RUC went easy on the IRA due to being manipulated politically. Flanagan felt that some in the hierarchy of his own church treated him with a certain coolness.

== Death ==
Sir Jamie Flanagan died on 4 April 1999, aged 85.

Police appointments
Preceded by Sir Graham Shillington	Chief Constable of the Royal Ulster Constabulary; 1973 — 1976	Succeeded by Sir Kenneth Newman
