= Joseph Hutcheson =

Joseph Hutcheson may refer to:

- Joseph Chappell Hutcheson (1842–1924), Texas politician and United States Representative
- Joseph Chappell Hutcheson Jr. (1879–1973), United States federal judge and son of the Texas Representative
- Joseph Collier Hutcheson (1906–1972), Virginia state senator
- Joe Hutcheson (1905–1993), baseball player

== See also ==
- Joseph Hutchinson (disambiguation)
