= 1915 Dublin College Green by-election =

UK Parliamentary by-election

The 1915 Dublin College Green by-election was held on 11 June 1915. The by-election was held due to the death of the incumbent Irish Parliamentary MP, Joseph Nannetti. It was won by the Irish Parliamentary candidate John Dillon Nugent.

By-election 11 June 1915: Dublin College Green
Party	Candidate	Votes	%	±%
Irish Parliamentary	John Dillon Nugent	2,445	57.38	N/A
Labour	Thomas Farren	1,816	42.62	New
Majority		629	14.76	N/A
Turnout		4,261	52.2	N/A
Irish Parliamentary hold		Swing	N/A	

Nannetti had represented an older school of trade unionism, based on skilled workmen and emphasising shared interest between workmen and employer, which was challenged by the rise of Larkinism mass unionism. With the appearance of an independent Labour candidate in the subsequent by-election it was seen as significant in the drift of labour workers away from the Irish Party.
