= Albert Kennedy =

Sir Albert Kennedy, KPM (11 May 1906 – 11 October 1991) was a United Kingdom police officer who was Inspector-General of the Royal Ulster Constabulary from 1961 to 1969.

He joined the force in 1924; and was promoted to District Inspector, 1936; County Inspector, 1951; Deputy Commissioner (Belfast), 1954; and Deputy Inspector General, 1957 before being given the top job.
