= W. F. McCoy =

British politician

William Frederick McCoy QC (19 January 1885 – 4 December 1976) was an Ulster Unionist member of the Parliament of Northern Ireland for South Tyrone who went on to become an early supporter of Ulster nationalism.

Born in Fivemiletown, County Tyrone into a Methodist family, McCoy was the son of merchant William McCoy of Monaghan and Charlotte Murphy of Fermanagh. He was educated at Clones High School and Trinity College Dublin, where he studied law. After serving in the British Army during World War I McCoy became a barrister in 1920 and held a number of leading legal positions in Northern Ireland including Crown Prosecutor for County Fermanagh (from 1926), Resident Magistrate for Belfast (1937–1943) and Senior Crown Prosecutor for Belfast (1949–1967).

Initially elected to the Parliament in a by-election on 12 April 1945 (following the death of Rowley Elliott the previous year), McCoy held the seat for the Ulster Unionists until his retirement in 1965. Whilst at first his political viewpoints were fairly typical of Unionism at the time, McCoy began to doubt how far the Union was safeguarded by the existing status of Northern Ireland as it was entirely determined by the United Kingdom, whom, he felt, could as easily vote it out of existence as retain it. As a result, McCoy called for Northern Ireland to be governed as a Dominion within the Commonwealth, along the lines of Australia and Canada, with the British monarch retained as Head of State, but with the Northern Irish Parliament otherwise free to govern.

McCoy's ideas were generally rejected by the Unionist establishment, who were generally happy with the way things were, and he was sidelined, although he did serve as Speaker of the House of Commons of Northern Ireland in 1956 during a brief period when the long-term Speaker Sir Norman Stronge was forced to step aside. An office Stronge held was found to disqualify him, but he resigned it and a Bill was rushed through Parliament to indemnify him. McCoy stepped down from the Northern Ireland House of Commons in 1965, when his seat was won by John Taylor. McCoy continued to write in support of his Dominion plans until his death in 1976.

Parliament of Northern Ireland
| Preceded by Rowley Elliott | Member of Parliament for South Tyrone; 1945 – 65 | Succeeded by John Taylor |
Political offices
| Preceded by Norman Stronge | Speaker of the Northern Ireland House of Commons; 1956 | Succeeded by Norman Stronge |
