= Middletown Centre for Autism =

Training centre for the education of autistic people

Coordinates: 54°17′19″N 6°50′42″W

The Middletown Centre for Autism in Middletown, County Armagh, Northern Ireland, is a centre for training in education for young people with autistic spectrum disorder. The purpose of the centre is to support the promotion of excellence throughout Northern Ireland and Ireland in the education of autistic children and young people – the Department of Education of Northern Ireland and the Department of Education and Skills of Ireland contributed 4 board members each.

In May 2009, the Irish government announced they would not be able to afford to fund the expansion of the centre. In December 2009, the Irish government said that the funding of the expansion of the centre was back on track.
