= Armagh (Northern Ireland Parliament constituency) =

Coordinates: 54.348°N 6.656°W

- Former County constituency for the Parliament of Northern Ireland
- Armagh shown within Northern Ireland

Former constituency
- Created: 1921
- Abolished: 1929
- Election method: Single transferable vote

Armagh was a county constituency of the Parliament of Northern Ireland from 1921 to 1929. It returned four MPs, using proportional representation by means of the single transferable vote.

== Boundaries ==
Armagh was created by the Government of Ireland Act 1920 and consisted of the entirety of County Armagh. The House of Commons (Method of Voting and Redistribution of Seats) Act (Northern Ireland) 1929 divided the constituency into four constituencies elected under first past the post: Central, Mid, North and South Armagh constituencies.

== Second Dáil ==
In May 1921, Dáil Éireann, the parliament of the self-declared Irish Republic run by Sinn Féin, passed a resolution declaring that elections to the House of Commons of Northern Ireland and the House of Commons of Southern Ireland would be used as the election for the Second Dáil. All those elected were on the roll of the Second Dáil, but Michael Collins, who was also elected for Cork Mid, North, South, South East and West, was the only MP elected for Armagh to sit as a TD in Dáil Éireann.

== Politics ==
Armagh had a slight Unionist majority, but this was fairly evenly balanced with a Nationalist minority. In both general elections, two Unionists were elected, alongside one Nationalist and one Republican.

== Members of Parliament ==
Election	MP (Party)	MP (Party)	MP (Party)	MP (Party)
1921	Michael Collins (Sinn Féin)	John Dillon Nugent (Nationalist)	Richard Best (UUP)	David Graham Shillington (UUP)
1922	vacant	John Dillon Nugent (Nationalist)	Richard Best (UUP)	David Graham Shillington (UUP)
1925	Eamon Donnelly (Republican)	John Henry Collins (Nationalist)	Richard Best (UUP)	David Graham Shillington (UUP)
1925 by	Eamon Donnelly (Republican)	John Henry Collins (Nationalist)	John Clarke Davison (UUP)	David Graham Shillington (UUP)

== MPs' lifespans ==
Name	Born	Died
Richard Best	11 December 1869	23 February 1939
Michael Collins	16 October 1890	22 August 1922
David Graham Shillington	10 December 1872	22 January 1944
John Dillon Nugent	22 December 1869	1 March 1940
Eamon Donnelly	19 July 1877	29 December 1944
John Henry Collins	3 March 1880	12 June 1952
John Clarke Davison	19 April 1875	19 February 1946

== Elections ==
24 May 1921 General Election: Armagh (4 seats)
Party	Candidate	FPv%	Count	
Party	Candidate	FPv%	1	2
UUP	Richard Best	34.36	15,988	
Sinn Féin	Michael Collins	27.20	12,656	
UUP	David Graham Shillington	20.91	9,730	
Nationalist	John Dillon Nugent	14.74	6,857	6,960
Sinn Féin	Frank Aiken	2.80	1,301	1,329
Electorate: 53,977 Valid: 46,532 Quota: 9,307 Turnout: 86.2%

- Collins died on 22 August 1922; his seat remained vacant at dissolution.

3 April 1925 General Election: Armagh (4 seats)
Party	Candidate	FPv%	Count		
Party	Candidate	FPv%	1	2	3
UUP	Richard Best	37.50	15,969		
UUP	David Graham Shillington	24.83	10,575		
Republican	Eamon Donnelly	13.57	5,788	5,823	5,838
Nationalist	John Henry Collins	12.38	5,272	5,354	5,393
Nationalist	John Dillon Nugent	11.72	4,991	5,063	5,116
Electorate: 54,082 Valid: 42,595 Quota: 8,520 Turnout: 78.8%

- Appointment of Best as Lord Justice of Appeal

Armagh by-election, 1925
Party	Candidate	Votes	%	±%
UUP	John Clarke Davison	22,390	79.20	
Unbought Tenants	William Robert Todd	5,880	20.80	New
Majority		16,510	58.40	
Turnout		54,082	52.3	−26.5
UUP hold		Swing	N/A	

== See also ==
- Northern Ireland Parliamentary Election Results 1921-1972, compiled and edited by Sydney Elliott (Political Reference Publications 1973)
