= Irish National Foresters =

Irish friendly society

The Irish National Foresters' Benefit Society (Coillteoirí Náisiúnta na hÉireann in Irish) is an Irish friendly society.

The INF began in 1877 as a breakaway from the Ancient Order of Foresters after political disagreements. The INF grew rapidly and soon became the largest friendly society in Ireland. It supported Irish nationalism and its constitution called for "government for Ireland by the Irish people in accordance with Irish ideas and Irish aspirations".

By 1914 the order had spread worldwide and had a quarter of a million members in over 1,000 branches. The influx of Irish labour into Scotland in the 19th century saw the movement gain a foothold, first in the west and later as far as the east coast. They were also prominent in Australia.

With the establishment of the Irish Free State and the gradual expansion of the social welfare system, the INF went into decline. Some branches, particularly in Ulster, still exist. The INF brass band in Navan in County Meath is still promoting music in its surroundings. They practice once a week in the CYWS (Catholic Young Women's Society) hall located in the centre of the town. The only branch left in Republic of Ireland is the one in Tullamore with over 80 members.

== Prominent members ==
- Richard Corish, High Chief Ranger in 1942
- Joseph Hutchinson (1852–1928) founded the INF in 1877 with eight other men. Trustee 1881; Treasurer 1844; and General Secretary 1846.
