= Marion Paterson Macmillan =

Police officer

Marion Paterson Macmillan MBE BEM was an officer in both the Metropolitan Police and Royal Ulster Constabulary, notable as the first head of the latter's Women Police Branch from 1943 to 1965.

== Life ==
Born in Oban, Argyllshire, she joined the Metropolitan Police on July 16, 1934 and was promoted to Woman Sergeant in 1940, three years before she was recommended by Dorothy Peto to head the RUC's new Women Police Branch. She transferred on 6 September 1943 and remained in that post until retiring to Scotland at the rank of Woman District Inspector on October 31, 1965, succeeded by P. E. M. McClements from Donaghadee. She was awarded the British Empire Medal in 1951 and an MBE in 1964, along with an honorary MA from Queen's University Belfast in summer 1965 for her teaching in its Department of Social Studies since 1943.
