= Eamon Donnelly =

Irish politician (1877–1944)

Member of the Northern Ireland Parliament for Belfast Falls
- In office April 1942 – December 1944

Teachta Dála
- In office January 1933 – July 1937
- Constituency: Leix–Offaly

Member of the Northern Ireland Parliament for Armagh (abstenionist)
- In office April 1925 – May 1929

Personal details
- Born: 19 July 1877 Middletown, County Armagh, Ireland
- Died: 29 December 1944 (aged 67) Dublin, Ireland
- Party: Fianna Fáil; Independent Republican
- Children: 4

Eamon Donnelly (19 July 1877 – 29 December 1944) was an Irish politician.

He was born in Middletown, County Armagh, the son of Francis Donnelly, a mason, and Catherine Donnelly (née Haggin). He was a member of the Irish Volunteers. Donnelly was among the group of Volunteers that assembled for the Easter Rising of 1916 in Coalisland, County Tyrone. Donnelly organized a 40-man unit of the Irish Volunteers for security at the 1918 South Armagh by-election. In 1921 he joined Éamon de Valera's anti-treaty forces and worked to end partition until his death.

In February 1923 Donnelly was interned by the Irish Free State military and released in August. Rearrested and again interned he joined the 1923 Irish hunger strikes, undergoing a forty-one day hunger strike. Upon his release Donnelly was appointed Chief Organiser of Sinn Féin. During the 1920s Donnelly worked with the Anti Partitionist Cahir Healy to establish a unified approach against partition. In his 1950 autobiography the Irish diplomat and a founder of The Irish Press newspaper Robert Brennan wrote that Donnelly felt that partition would be short-lived and that "...the contributions Eamonn Donnelly made towards that end will not be forgotten."

While living in Newry, Donnelly was elected as an abstentionist Independent Republican member of the Parliament of Northern Ireland for the Armagh constituency at the 1925 general election. Shortly after his election, he was served with an order excluding him from Northern Ireland. No official reason was given for the granting of this order.

In 1926, he became a founder member of Fianna Fáil. Donnelly was elected to Dáil Éireann as a Fianna Fáil Teachta Dála (TD) for the Leix–Offaly constituency at the 1933 general election. He did not contest the 1937 general election. He also served as Director of Elections for Fianna Fáil.

In 1938, Donnelly visited his wife's house near Newry, and was imprisoned in Belfast Prison, before being given a choice between paying a fine of £25 or returning to prison. Again, no reason for his imprisonment and exclusion was revealed. Donnelly refused to pay the fine and spent a month and a half in prison. That year, he stood for election to the 2nd Seanad, but was not successful.

In 1942, Donnelly was again elected to the Parliament of Northern Ireland, this time in a by-election for Belfast Falls. Again, he refused to take his seat. He died on 29 December 1944. In 2012 Donnelly's family donated more than 400 documents relating to the life and work of Eamon Donnelly to the Newry and Mourne Museum.

Parliament of Northern Ireland
Preceded by John Dillon Nugent	Member of Parliament for Armagh; 1925–1929	Succeeded by John Henry Collins
Preceded by Richard Byrne	Member of Parliament for Belfast Falls; 1942–1944	Succeeded by Harry Diamond

Dáil	Election	Deputy (Party)	Deputy (Party)	Deputy (Party)	Deputy (Party)	Deputy (Party)
2nd	1921	Joseph Lynch (SF)	Patrick McCartan (SF)	Francis Bulfin (SF)	Kevin O'Higgins (SF)	4 seats 1921–1923
3rd	1922	William Davin (Lab)	Patrick McCartan (PT-SF)	Francis Bulfin (PT-SF)	Kevin O'Higgins (PT-SF)	4 seats 1921–1923
4th	1923	William Davin (Lab)	Laurence Brady (Rep)	Francis Bulfin (CnaG)	Patrick Egan (CnaG)	Seán McGuinness (Rep)
4th	1926 by-election	William Davin (Lab)	Laurence Brady (Rep)	Francis Bulfin (CnaG)	Patrick Egan (CnaG)	James Dwyer (CnaG)
5th	1927 (Jun)	William Davin (Lab)	Patrick Boland (FF)	Thomas Tynan (FF)	John Gill (Lab)	James Dwyer (CnaG)
6th	1927 (Sep)	William Davin (Lab)	Patrick Boland (FF)	Patrick Gorry (FF)	William Aird (CnaG)	James Dwyer (CnaG)
7th	1932	William Davin (Lab)	Patrick Boland (FF)	Patrick Gorry (FF)	Thomas F. O'Higgins (CnaG)	Eugene O'Brien (CnaG)
8th	1933	William Davin (Lab)	Patrick Boland (FF)	Eamon Donnelly (FF)	Thomas F. O'Higgins (CnaG)	Jack Finlay (NCP)
9th	1937	William Davin (Lab)	Patrick Boland (FF)	Patrick Gorry (FF)	Thomas F. O'Higgins (FG)	Jack Finlay (FG)
10th	1938	William Davin (Lab)	Patrick Boland (FF)	Patrick Gorry (FF)	Thomas F. O'Higgins (FG)	Daniel Hogan (FF)
11th	1943	William Davin (Lab)	Patrick Boland (FF)	Patrick Gorry (FF)	Thomas F. O'Higgins (FG)	Oliver J. Flanagan (IMR)
12th	1944	William Davin (Lab)	Patrick Boland (FF)	Patrick Gorry (FF)	Thomas F. O'Higgins (FG)	Oliver J. Flanagan (IMR)
13th	1948	William Davin (Lab)	Patrick Boland (FF)	Patrick Gorry (FF)	Tom O'Higgins, Jnr (FG)	Oliver J. Flanagan (Ind.)
14th	1951	William Davin (Lab)	Patrick Boland (FF)	Peadar Maher (FF)	Tom O'Higgins, Jnr (FG)	Oliver J. Flanagan (Ind.)
15th	1954	William Davin (Lab)	Nicholas Egan (FF)	Peadar Maher (FF)	Tom O'Higgins, Jnr (FG)	Oliver J. Flanagan (FG)
15th	1956 by-election	Kieran Egan (FF)	Nicholas Egan (FF)	Peadar Maher (FF)	Tom O'Higgins, Jnr (FG)	Oliver J. Flanagan (FG)
16th	1957	Kieran Egan (FF)	Nicholas Egan (FF)	Peadar Maher (FF)	Tom O'Higgins, Jnr (FG)	Oliver J. Flanagan (FG)
17th	1961	Kieran Egan (FF)	Nicholas Egan (FF)	Patrick Lalor (FF)	Tom O'Higgins, Jnr (FG)	Oliver J. Flanagan (FG)
18th	1965	Henry Byrne (Lab)	Nicholas Egan (FF)	Patrick Lalor (FF)	Tom O'Higgins, Jnr (FG)	Oliver J. Flanagan (FG)
19th	1969	Ger Connolly (FF)	Bernard Cowen (FF)	Patrick Lalor (FF)	Tom Enright (FG)	Oliver J. Flanagan (FG)
20th	1973	Ger Connolly (FF)	Charles McDonald (FG)	Patrick Lalor (FF)	Tom Enright (FG)	Oliver J. Flanagan (FG)
21st	1977	Ger Connolly (FF)	Bernard Cowen (FF)	Patrick Lalor (FF)	Tom Enright (FG)	Oliver J. Flanagan (FG)
22nd	1981	Ger Connolly (FF)	Bernard Cowen (FF)	Liam Hyland (FF)	Tom Enright (FG)	Oliver J. Flanagan (FG)
23rd	1982 (Feb)	Ger Connolly (FF)	Bernard Cowen (FF)	Liam Hyland (FF)	Tom Enright (FG)	Oliver J. Flanagan (FG)
24th	1982 (Nov)	Ger Connolly (FF)	Bernard Cowen (FF)	Liam Hyland (FF)	Tom Enright (FG)	Oliver J. Flanagan (FG)
24th	1984 by-election	Ger Connolly (FF)	Brian Cowen (FF)	Liam Hyland (FF)	Tom Enright (FG)	Oliver J. Flanagan (FG)
25th	1987	Ger Connolly (FF)	Brian Cowen (FF)	Liam Hyland (FF)	Tom Enright (FG)	Charles Flanagan (FG)
26th	1989	Ger Connolly (FF)	Brian Cowen (FF)	Liam Hyland (FF)	Tom Enright (FG)	Charles Flanagan (FG)
27th	1992	Ger Connolly (FF)	Brian Cowen (FF)	Liam Hyland (FF)	Pat Gallagher (Lab)	Charles Flanagan (FG)
28th	1997	John Moloney (FF)	Brian Cowen (FF)	Seán Fleming (FF)	Tom Enright (FG)	Charles Flanagan (FG)
29th	2002	John Moloney (FF)	Brian Cowen (FF)	Seán Fleming (FF)	Olwyn Enright (FG)	Tom Parlon (PDs)
30th	2007	John Moloney (FF)	Brian Cowen (FF)	Seán Fleming (FF)	Olwyn Enright (FG)	Charles Flanagan (FG)
31st	2011	Brian Stanley (SF)	Barry Cowen (FF)	Seán Fleming (FF)	Marcella Corcoran Kennedy (FG)	Charles Flanagan (FG)
32nd	2016	Constituency abolished. See Laois and Offaly.				
33rd	2020	Brian Stanley (SF)	Barry Cowen (FF)	Seán Fleming (FF)	Carol Nolan (Ind.)	Charles Flanagan (FG)
33rd	2024	Brian Stanley (SF)	(Vacant)	Seán Fleming (FF)	Carol Nolan (Ind.)	Charles Flanagan (FG)
34th	2024	Constituency abolished. See Laois and Offaly.				
