= James Richard Strong =

American politician (1906–1990)

Member of the U.S. House of Representatives from Missouri's 119th district
- In office 1973–1982

Missouri House of Representatives

Personal details
- Born: 1921 Marshfield, Missouri, US
- Died: 1998 (aged 76–77)
- Party: Republican
- Spouse: Frances Sue Quinn
- Children: 3 (1 son, 2 daughters)
- Occupation: savings and loan director, cattle farmer

James Richard Strong (January 10, 1921 - 1998) was an American Republican politician who served in the Missouri House of Representatives. He later served in the Missouri Senate in the 1980s. He was born in Marshfield, Missouri, and was educated at Jefferson City public schools, the United States Naval Training Center, and other United States Navy schools in San Diego, California, and San Pedro, California. On September 20, 1947, he married Frances Sue Quinn in Jefferson City, Missouri. He was aboard the USS Phoenix during the attack on Pearl Harbor.
