= James N. Strong =

Second Lieutenant James N. Strong
- Born: 28 February 1818; Pittsfield, Massachusetts
- Died: 17 December 1900 (aged 82); Fairfield, Iowa
- Burial place: Old Fairfield Cemetery, Fairfield, Iowa
- Military career
- Allegiance: United States
- Branch: Army
- Service years: 1862-1863
- Rank: Second Lieutenant
- Units: Company C, 49th Massachusetts Infantry
- Conflicts: Port Hudson, Louisiana
- Awards: Medal of Honor

James N. Strong (28 February 1818 - 17 December 1900) was a second lieutenant in the United States Army who was awarded the Medal of Honor for gallantry during the American Civil War. Strong was awarded the medal on 25 November 1893 for actions performed at the Battle of Port Hudson in Louisiana on 27 May 1863.

== Personal life ==
Strong was born on 28 February 1818 in Pittsfield, Berkshire County, Massachusetts to parents Noble Strong and Anna King Strong, one of four children. He married Clarissa Wells Strong in 1846 and fathered one child. He was a farmer by trade. He died in Fairfield, Jefferson County, Iowa on 17 December 1900 and is buried in Old Fairfield Cemetery in Fairfield.

== Military service ==
Strong enlisted in the Army as a sergeant on 11 September 1862 in Pittsfield. He was listed as being 42 years old. He was mustered into Company C of the 49th Massachusetts Infantry on 19 September 1862. On 27 May 1863, Strong volunteered to assault the Confederate works at Port Hudson before the general attack. His Medal of Honor citation reads:

The President of the United States of America, in the name of Congress, takes pleasure in presenting the Medal of Honor to Sergeant James N. Strong, United States Army, for extraordinary heroism on 27 May 1863, while serving with Company C, 49th Massachusetts Infantry, in action at Port Hudson, Louisiana. Sergeant Strong volunteered in response to a call and took part in the movement that was made upon the enemy's works under a heavy fire there from in advance of the general assault.

— D. S. Lamont, Secretary of War

Strong was injured during this assault. He was promoted to second lieutenant on 24 June 1863 but was mustered out of the Army on 1 September 1863 in Pittsfield.
