= James M. Stronge =

Parliament of Northern Ireland (1932–1981)

Major James M. Stronge

Member of the Northern Ireland House of Commons
- In office 1969–1972
- Constituency: Mid Armagh

Member of the Northern Ireland Assembly
- In office 1973–1974
- Constituency: Armagh

Personal details
- Born: 21 June 1932
- Died: 21 January 1981 (aged 48) Tynan Abbey, County Armagh
- Cause of death: Assassination (gunshot wounds)
- Party: Ulster Unionist Party
- Occupation: Soldier, merchant banker, farm manager, reserve police constable

Major James Matthew Stronge (21 June 1932 – 21 January 1981) was a soldier and Ulster Unionist Party MP in the Parliament of Northern Ireland, and the later Northern Ireland Assembly. He was the son and heir of Sir Norman Stronge, Bt; they were both killed by the Provisional Irish Republican Army at his family home, Tynan Abbey.

== Biography ==
Born into an aristocratic family, he was educated at Eton College and Christ Church, Oxford. In 1967, he was appointed High Sheriff of Armagh.

He served as Ulster Unionist Member of Parliament (MP) for Mid Armagh for three years until the prorogation of Stormont in 1972 and a member of the Northern Ireland Assembly, 1973-1974. In March 1972 Stronge was one of several unionist figures who appeared on the platform at an Ulster Vanguard rally in Portadown. Three thousand men, including a large contingent of Ulster Special Constabulary Association members, were assembled in front of the platform. He opposed the power-sharing executive established by the 1973 Sunningdale Agreement, stating he couldn't accept an executive which involved nationalist politicians, including the Social Democratic and Labour Party (SDLP).

Stronge was also an officer in the Grenadier Guards. Having withdrawn from political and military life, his main interests since were confined to merchant banking and service as a RUC Reserve Constable.

== Death ==
James Stronge was gunned down alongside his elderly father Norman, by the Provisional Irish Republican Army in the library of his home, Tynan Abbey, on the evening of 21 January 1981.

The Stronge family's home was then burnt to the ground. The bodies of father and son were later recovered from their blazing home. On seeing the explosions at the house (and a flare Norman had lit in an attempt to alert the authorities), Royal Ulster Constabulary (RUC) personnel arrived at the scene and established a road block at the gate lodge. They encountered at least eight fleeing gunmen in two vehicles that rammed the checkpoint. The gunmen got off the cars and scattered. There followed a gunfight lasting 20 minutes in which at least 200 shots were fired before the attackers faded away. There were no casualties among the security forces.

Author Tim Pat Coogan stated that Norman Stronge and his son were shot because sectarian assassinations were claiming the lives of Catholics, but did not state that they were involved in these killings.

Son and father were buried in Tynan Parish church, at his funeral, a telegram sent from the Queen (to one of Norman's daughters) was read, it stated; "I was deeply shocked to learn of the tragic death of your father and brother; Prince Philip joins me in sending you and your sister all our deepest sympathy on your dreadful loss. Sir Norman's loyal and distinguished service will be remembered".

In 1984, Seamus Shannon was arrested by the Garda Síochána in the Republic of Ireland and handed over to the RUC on a warrant accusing him of involvement in the killing of James and his father. The Irish Supreme Court considering his extradition to Northern Ireland rejected the defence that these were political offences saying that they were "so brutal, cowardly and callous that it would be a distortion of language if they were to be accorded the status of a political offence". The charges were later dropped against Shannon.

== Memorial ==
James Stronge is remembered with a tablet in the assembly chamber in the Parliament Buildings at Stormont. He is also listed on the National Police Memorial Roll of Honour.

== See also ==
- Provisional IRA East Tyrone Brigade

Parliament of Northern Ireland
Preceded by Sir Norman Stronge, Bt	Member of Parliament for Mid Armagh; 1969–1973	Parliament abolished
Northern Ireland Assembly (1973)
New assembly	Assembly Member for Armagh; 1973–1974	Assembly abolished
