= Middletown, County Armagh =

Village in County Armagh, Northern Ireland

Coordinates: 54.29274°N 6.84388°W

Middletown: Irish: Coillidh Chanannáin; Scots: Middletoun / Mïddletoon
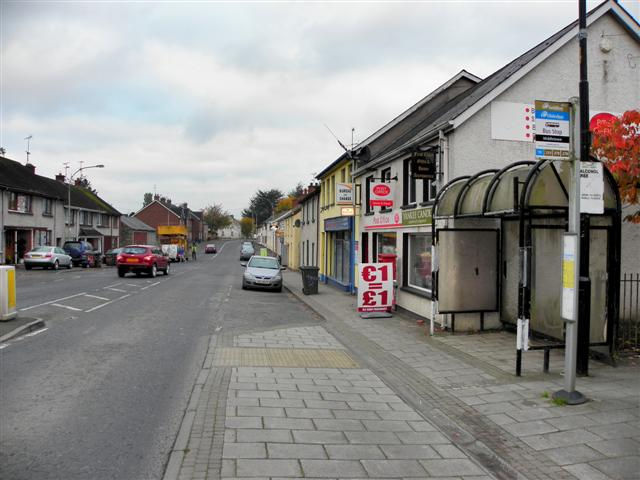
- Main Street, on the A3

- Location within Northern Ireland
- Population: 237 (2011 census)
- Irish grid reference: H753388
  - Belfast: 50 mi (80 km)
  - Dublin: 69 mi (111 km)
- District: Armagh City, Banbridge and Craigavon
- County: County Armagh
- Country: Northern Ireland
- Sovereign state: United Kingdom
- Post town: ARMAGH
- Postcode district: BT60
- Dialling code: 028
- UK Parliament: Newry & Armagh
- NI Assembly: Newry & Armagh

Middletown is a small village and townland in County Armagh, Northern Ireland. It lies near the border with County Monaghan, between Armagh and Monaghan along the A3. It had a population of 237 people (91 households) in the 2011 census.

== Geography ==
Middletown was built in the townland of Middletown, which was known throughout the 17th century under variants of the name Killecannagan (from Irish Coillidh Chanannáin 'Canannán's wood'). It is known for its picturesque countryside and its rolling green hills. The hills are made up of numerous drumlins that make up the countryside. At the bottom of the valleys that many of these drumlins form, glens can be found with many tributaries of the River Blackwater flowing through them. The River Cor flows through the Middletown countryside and right by the village. It is the most prominent river in Middletown; once a canal system operated on it, namely the Ulster Canal.

== History ==
Middletown was one of several Catholic border villages in Armagh that would have been transferred to the Irish Free State had the recommendations of the Irish Boundary Commission been enacted in 1925.

== Education ==
Children from Middletown formerly went to three different primary schools: St John's Boys' School, St Louis Convent School for girls, and Glasdrummond Primary School (boys and girls). Due to low numbers in the mid-1990s, a new school was built on the site of St John's Boys' School and was opened in June 1999, whereupon all three primary schools were amalgamated.

An all-Ireland training centre for educating autistic children and young people was set up in 2007 called the Middletown Centre for Autism.

== Notable people ==
- Joe Coburn, Irish-American boxer who claimed the World Heavyweight Championship in 1862, born Middletown
- Eamon Donnelly, director of elections for Sinn Féin and a founding member of Fianna Fáil, was born in Middletown.

== Sport ==
Middletown has a long history of Gaelic games and the local Gaelic Athletic Association club, Middletown GAA, plays hurling as Na Fianna, football as Eoghan Ruadh, and camogie as St John's.

== See also ==
- List of towns and villages in Northern Ireland
- Market houses in Northern Ireland
- E2 European long distance path
