= Sir James Stronge, 5th Baronet =

Irish barrister, footballer and politician

Arms of the Stronge Baronets, of Tynan

Sir James Henry Stronge, 5th Baronet (8 December 1849 – 20 May 1928) was an Irish barrister, footballer and politician.

Stronge was educated at Eton College and Brasenose College, Oxford. He was pursuing a legal career when he inherited Tynan Abbey and succeeded his father, Sir John Stronge, 4th Baronet. He graduated from Lincoln's Inn in 1874. Stronge was appointed High Sheriff of Tyrone in 1880 and High Sheriff of Armagh in 1885.

He played for Old Etonians in the 1875 and 1876 FA Cup Finals.

He also held the position of Imperial Grand Master of the Orange Institution and was a Major in the 4th Battalion of Royal Inniskilling Fusiliers. He was one of 30 delegates to sit on the Ulster Unionist Council, which directed the policy of Ulster Unionism during the next 15 years and during the Home Rule crisis and the foundation of the partition of Ireland. Stronge's opinion on the issue of partition and Irish Nationalism was made clear: "One felt that if we have no friends south of the Newry Mountains, it might be better to draw the boundary line there and be frankly "West Britons" and not Irishmen".

Stronge married, on 7 October 1885, Ethel Margaret Burges and had issue:

- James Matthew Stronge (10 January 1891 – August 1917), killed in the Great War, at the Battle of Ypres, while serving as a Lieutenant with the Royal Irish Fusiliers in France.
- Zoe Edith Stronge, (22 November 1886 – 14 June 1949), she died unmarried and became a Dame.
- Daphne Helen Stronge (6 April 1889 – 1945), artist, married General Sir Walter William Pitt-Taylor
- Rose Ethel Stronge (21 January 1894)
- Jessy Stronge MBE (21 September 1896 – 12 October 1984)
- Joy Winifred Stronge (26 April 1901 – January 1972)

Non-profit organization positions
Preceded by Earl Erne	Grand Master of the Orange Institution of Ireland; 1914 – 1926?	Succeeded by William Lyons
Baronetage of the United Kingdom
Preceded by John Stronge	Baronet (of Tynan); 1899 – 1928	Succeeded by Walter Stronge
