= Joseph Hutchinson (Irish politician) =

Irish politician (1852–1928)

Lord Mayor of Dublin
- In office 1904–1906
- Preceded by: Timothy Harrington
- Succeeded by: Joseph Nannetti

Personal details
- Born: 1852; County Laois, Ireland
- Died: 23 October 1928 (aged 75–76); Dublin, Ireland
- Political party: United Irish League

Joseph Hutchinson (1852 – 23 October 1928) was an Irish politician. He was a member of the United Irish League.

Hutchinson was born in Borris-in-Ossory, and moved to Dublin the age of fifteen. He was a member of Dublin Corporation from 1890 to 1913, and served two terms as Lord Mayor of Dublin from 1904 to 1906. In 1877, he founded the Irish National Foresters' Benefit Society.

He was Sheriff of Dublin City in 1896. He is mentioned in James Joyce's Ulysses.

Civic offices
| Preceded by Timothy Harrington | Lord Mayor of Dublin; 1904–1906 | Succeeded by Joseph Nannetti |
