= Mid Armagh (Northern Ireland Parliament constituency) =

Coordinates: 54.314°N 6.586°W

- Former County constituency for the Parliament of Northern Ireland
- Mid Armagh shown within Northern Ireland

Former constituency
- Created: 1929
- Abolished: 1973
- Election method: First past the post

Mid Armagh was a constituency of the Parliament of Northern Ireland.

== Boundaries ==
Mid Armagh was a county constituency comprising the south central part of County Armagh. It was created when the House of Commons (Method of Voting and Redistribution of Seats) Act (Northern Ireland) 1929 introduced first-past-the-post elections throughout Northern Ireland. Mid Armagh was created by the division of Armagh into four new constituencies. The constituency survived unchanged, returning one member of Parliament, until the Parliament of Northern Ireland was temporarily suspended in 1972, and then formally abolished in 1973.

The seat was centred on the town of Armagh and included parts of the rural districts of Armagh, Newry and Tandragee.

== Politics ==
The seat was always won by Ulster Unionist Party candidates. It was contested on four occasions, by members of the Ulster Liberal Party and People's Democracy and by two independent Unionist candidates, all of whom took less than 30% of the votes cast.

== Members of Parliament ==
Elected	Party	Name
1929	UUP	John Clarke Davison
1938	UUP	(Sir) Norman Stronge
1969	UUP	James Stronge

== Election results ==
General Election 1929: Mid Armagh
Party	Candidate	Votes	%	±%
UUP	John Clarke Davison	7,729	70.8	
Ulster Liberal	William Robert Todd	3,195	29.2	
Majority		4,534	41.6	
Turnout		10,924	66.8	
UUP win (new seat)				

At 1933 Northern Ireland general election, John Clarke Davison was elected unopposed.

General Election 1938: Mid Armagh
Party	Candidate	Votes	%	±%
UUP	John Clarke Davison	7,750	72.6	N/A
Independent Progressive Unionist	George Norman Proctor	2,926	27.4	New
Majority		4,824	45.2	N/A
Turnout		10,676	67.1	N/A
UUP hold		Swing	N/A	

At the 1938 by-election and 1945, 1949, 1953, 1958 and 1962 Northern Ireland general elections, (Sir) Norman Stronge was elected unopposed.

General Election 1965: Mid Armagh
Party	Candidate	Votes	%	±%
UUP	Sir Norman Stronge	7,580	77.8	N/A
Ulster Liberal	Bert Hamilton	2,158	22.2	New
Majority		5,422	55.6	N/A
Turnout		9,738	62.5	N/A
UUP hold		Swing	N/A	

General Election 1969: Mid Armagh
Party	Candidate	Votes	%	±%
UUP	James Stronge	6,932	54.2	−23.6
People's Democracy	Cyril Toman	3,551	27.7	New
Ind. Unionist	J. I. Magowan	2,321	18.1	New
Majority		3,381	26.5	−29.1
Turnout		12,804	80.5	+18.0
UUP hold		Swing		
