= Sir James Stronge, 1st Baronet =

Arms of the Stronge Baronets, of Tynan

Rev. Sir James Stronge, 1st Baronet (1750 – 1 December 1804) was born in Tynan Abbey, County Armagh, Ireland. Tynan Abbey was built by his father.

On 27 May 1785, Reverend Stronge married Helen Tew of County Armagh and had issue:

- James Matthew (later the second baronet), (born 6 April 1786).

Stronge was awarded a baronetcy on 22 June 1803, due to his helping to secure the passage of the Act of Union; he died less than six months after receiving the baronetcy.

His widow later married William Holmes MP.

Baronetage of the United Kingdom
New creation	Baronet (of Tynan); 1803–1804	Succeeded by James Stronge
