= Graham Shillington =

Northern Irish police officer

Sir Graham Shillington CBE
- Born: Robert Edward Graham Shillington; 2 April 1911; Portadown, Ireland
- Died: 14 August 2001 (aged 90)
- Education: Clare College, Cambridge
- Occupation: Police officer
- Children: 3
- Father: David Graham Shillington

Sir Robert Edward Graham Shillington CBE (2 April 1911 – 14 August 2001) was a senior Northern Irish police officer. He served as Chief Constable of Royal Ulster Constabulary from 1970 to 1973.

== Early life ==
Shillington was born on 2 April 1911 in Portadown, Ireland. He was the youngest of six children born to Major David Graham Shillington, who went on to become a Member of the Parliament of Northern Ireland. He was educated at Castle Park School, a prep school in Dublin, Ireland, and Sedbergh School, a public boarding school in Yorkshire, England. He then attended Clare College, Cambridge, where he studied natural sciences. He graduated Bachelor of Arts (BA) in 1932.

== Police career ==
Shillington had originally planned to join the Civil Service, however he wanted a more varied career. He joined the Royal Ulster Constabulary on 8 February 1933 as a cadet officer. He completed his training at the Newtownards depot in County Down. He was promoted to district inspector in 1935, and served as officer in charge of D District in Belfast. In 1944, he was promoted to 1st Class District Inspector and was posted to Derry.

In 1953, after nine years in Derry, he was promoted to County Inspector and returned to Belfast. There, he joined the Inspector General's Headquarters and served in an administrative post. On 16 January 1961, he was appointed Commissioner of Belfast City.

In 1969, Shillington was appointed Deputy Inspector-General of the RUC, as second-in command to the Inspector-General, Anthony Peacocke (who, like Shillington, had been educated at Sedbergh and Cambridge). When the Battle of the Bogside broke out in Derry City in August, Shillington asked for permission to use CS gas for the first time in the United Kingdom. When that did not halt the rioting, he requested that the British Army be brought in. He had to telephone Peacocke in order to persuade him of this, on 13 August; the latter, who had long denied the need for army involvement, eventually agreed, but his reputation never recovered and following the publication of the Hunt Report in October he resigned as Inspector-General.

Shortly thereafter, Sir Arthur Young was seconded from the City of London Police to be the last Inspector-General and the first Chief Constable of the RUC. James Callaghan, then Home Secretary, sent him to implement the Hunt Report. Young's measures introduced the standard British rank system for police officers in Northern Ireland and disbanded the Ulster Special Constabulary. Shillington remained as Young's deputy, and when the latter returned to the mainland in 1970 he succeeded him to become the RUC's second Chief Constable.

== Honours and decorations ==
In the 1952 New Year Honours, Shillington was appointed Member of the Order of the British Empire (MBE). He was promoted to Officer of the Order of the British Empire (OBE) in the 1959 Queen's Birthday Honours. He was knighted in the 1972 Queen's Birthday Honours List.

== Personal life ==
Shillington married Mary (Peggy), née Bulloch, in 1935. They had two sons and a daughter.

Police appointments
Preceded by Sir Arthur Young	Chief Constable of the Royal Ulster Constabulary; 1970 to 1973	Succeeded by Sir James Flanagan
