= Richard Best (judge) =

Irish barrister, politician and Lord Justice of Appeal

The Right Honourable Richard Best KC
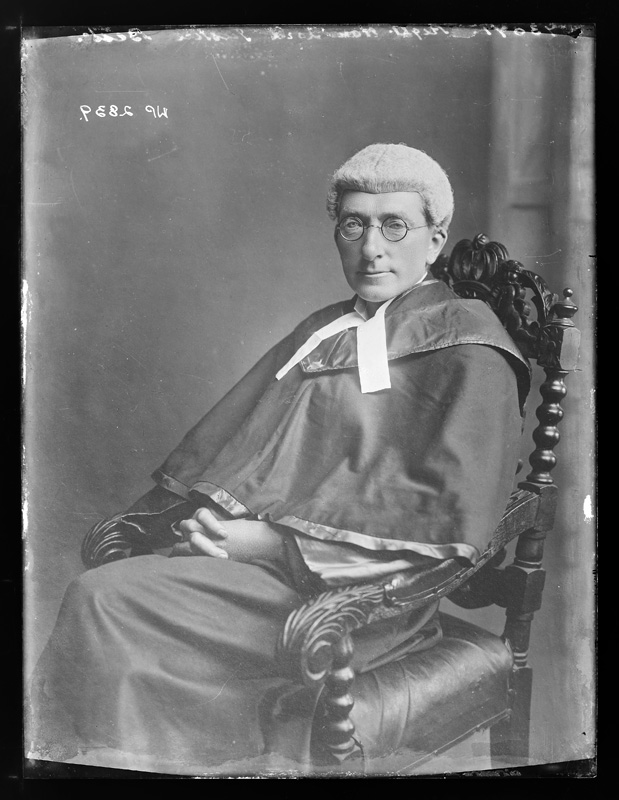
- Lord Justice Best, 24 July 1926

Lord Justice of Appeal of the Supreme Court of Northern Ireland
- In office 1925 – 23 February 1939

Attorney General for Northern Ireland
- In office 1921–1925

Member of the Northern Ireland Parliament for Armagh
- In office 1921–1925

Personal details
- Born: 11 December 1869 Richhill, County Armagh, Ireland
- Died: 23 February 1939 (aged 69)

Richard Best PC(Ire) KC (11 December 1869 – 23 February 1939) was an Irish barrister, politician and Lord Justice of Appeal.

Best was born in Richhill, County Armagh, son of farmers Robert and Anne Best. He was educated at the Educational Institution, Dundalk (now Dundalk Grammar School) and Trinity College, Dublin where he was Senior Moderator (BA) in mathematics in 1892, and was called to the bar by the King's Inns, Dublin in 1895. He took silk in 1912 and was elected a bencher in 1918. In 1921 he was elected to the House of Commons of Northern Ireland as Unionist member for Armagh and later the same year he was appointed Attorney General for Northern Ireland. He was appointed to the Privy Council of Ireland in the 1922 New Year Honours, entitling him to the style "The Right Honourable".

In 1925 he was appointed a Lord Justice of Appeal of the Supreme Court of Northern Ireland, a position he held until his death.

In 1904, he married Sarah Constance Bevington in St John's Church, Sevenoaks, Kent. They had a son, also called Richard.

== Arms ==
Coat of arms of Richard Best

Notes
Confirmed by Sir Nevile Rodwell Wilkinson, Ulster King of Arms, on 7 September 1935.
Crest
A dexter cubit arm erect vested Gules cuffed Argent charged with an ermine spor Or holding in the hand a sword Proper.
Torse
Of the colours.
Escutcheon
Ermine a cinquefoil Gules on a chief of the second a cockatrice between two lions' heads erased Argent langued Azure.
Motto
Optimus Est Qui Optime Facit

== Footnotes ==
Parliament of Northern Ireland
New parliament	Member of Parliament for Armagh; 1921–1925	Succeeded by John Clarke Davison
Political offices
New office	Attorney General for Northern Ireland; 1921–1925	Succeeded by Anthony Babington
