= Stronge baronets =

Baronetcy in the Baronetage of the United Kingdom

The Stronge baronetcy of Tynan was conferred in the Baronetage of the United Kingdom on 22 June 1803. The family were northern Irish landowners of Tynan Abbey, County Armagh, also possessing the residence of Lizard Manor, Aghadowey, County Londonderry.

== Stronge Baronets, of Tynan (1803) ==
1. Rev. Sir James Stronge, 1st Baronet (1750 – 1 December 1804); born at Tynan Abbey, County Armagh, the country house built by his father.
2. Sir James Matthew Stronge, 2nd Baronet', DL, DCL (6 April 1786 – 2 December 1864), son of the first Baronet. He served as a Gentleman of the Privy Chamber. In 1810 he married Isabella Calvert, daughter of Nicolson Calvert, of Hunsdon House, Hertfordshire, and had four sons, including the third and fourth baronets.
3. Sir James Matthew Stronge, 3rd Baronet, DL, JP (25 November 1811 – 11 March 1885), was a military officer and landowner, eldest son of the second baronet. He was succeeded by his brother.
4. Sir John Calvert Stronge, 4th BaronetDL JP, BL (21 February 1813 – 29 December 1899). Stronge was a barrister. He was born, and baptised, at his grandfather's home, Hertfordshire, England, as opposed to his family's seat at Tynan Abbey. He served as chief magistrate of police at Dublin, and solicitor to the Board of Inland Revenue for Ireland, and was also a justice of the peace for County Armagh and County Tyrone as well as deputy lieutenant of County Armagh. In 1888, he was also responsible for the grounds of Tynan Abbey being made open to the public. He succeeded his brother James in the baronetcy at the age of 71 years. He married Lady Margaret Zoe Caulfeild, daughter of Henry Caulfeild and only sister of James Molyneux Caulfeild, 3rd Earl of Charlemont on 14 September 1848 and had issue: Sir James Stronge, 5th Baronet; Sir Francis William Stronge, K.C.M.G. He was succeeded in 1899 by his eldest son.
5. Sir James Henry Stronge, 5th Baronet, PC (8 December 1849 – 20 May 1928), barrister and politician. He was a committed Unionist, serving as a delegate to the Ulster Unionist Council. He was succeeded in the baronetcy by his cousin Capt. Walter Stronge.
6. Sir Walter Lockhart Stronge, 6th Baronet, JP, DL (5 September 1860 – 5 June 1933). Stronge was a soldier. He succeeded his cousin in the baronetcy in 1928. He was deputy lieutenant of County Armagh and a justice of the peace for County Down, also having a military career with the 4th Battalion of the Royal Inniskilling Fusiliers. He died without issue and was succeeded by his brother Charles.
7. Sir Charles Edmond Sinclair Stronge, 7th Baronet (5 February 1862 – 5 December 1939), succeeded his brother. He was also a member of The Apprentice Boys of Derry Parent Club in Londonderry.
8. Sir Charles Norman Lockhart Stronge, 8th Baronet, PC (23 July 1894 – 21 January 1981) Killed by the Provisional IRA on 21 January 1981, together with his son and heir.
9. Major Sir James Matthew Stronge, 9th Baronet (21 June 1932 – 21 January 1981), son of the 8th Baronet. Killed with his father and consequently briefly the 9th baronet.
10. Sir James Anselan Maxwell Stronge, 10th Baronet (b. 17 July 1946). He is the son of Maxwell du Pré James Stronge and grandson of Edward Owen Fortescue Stronge, a brother of the 7th Baronet.

There is no heir to the title.

== Tynan Abbey ==
The lands of Tynan Abbey are held by the grandson of Sir Norman, 8th baronet.

Members of the family include Sir Norman and James Stronge, both politicians, who were killed by the IRA. The family seat, Tynan Abbey, was bombed during the attack and burned to the ground; its ruin has since been demolished.

== See also ==
A son of the 4th baronet was Sir Francis William Stronge (1856–1924), an envoy to Chile.

== Coat of arms of the baronet ==
Arms of the Stronge Baronets, of Tynan

=== Crests ===
- "A cluster of wine grapes"
- "An eagle with two heads displayed beaked and legged"

=== Shield ===
Quarterly:

- 1st and 4th argent, a chevron, undée sable, between three lozenges, azure, in the centre chief point, an estoile, gules (for Stronge);
- 2nd argent, an eagle displayed, or (for Manson);
- 3rd quarterly, 1st and 4th, or, a ship of one mast, sable; 2nd and 3rd, or, a fesse chequy argent, and azure (for Echlin).

=== Mottoes ===
- "Tentanda via est" – the way must be tried
- "Dulce quod utile" – pleasant because useful

== Notes ==
Baronetage of the United Kingdom
Preceded by Stewart baronets	Stronge baronets of Tynan; 22 June 1803	Succeeded by Barlow baronets
