= David Graham Shillington =

Major David Graham Shillington PC (NI)
- Born: 10 December 1872
- Died: 22 January 1944
- Occupation: Politician
- Children: 6, including; Graham Shillington
- Relatives: Thomas Shillington (cousin); Geoffrey Cather (nephew)

Major David Graham Shillington PC(NI) (10 December 1872 – 22 January 1944) was an Ulster Unionist politician and agricultural and builders' merchant.

== Early life ==
Shillington was a son of Thomas Primus Shillington (1831-1889), of Tavanagh House, Portadown, County Armagh, of a prominent Methodist mercantile family, by his wife Mary Jane (d. 1915), née Graham. His cousin was the factory owner and politician Thomas Shillington. Shillington was educated at Methodist College Belfast and Rydalmount School, Colwyn Bay. He was the proprietor of a general merchant's shop in Belfast. In April 1895 he married Sarah Louisa Collen of Killicomaine, Portadown and they had six children. He served in the First World War as a Major in the 9th Royal Irish Fusiliers.

== Career ==
In 1921, he was elected to the House of Commons of Northern Ireland as Unionist member for Armagh, and then for Armagh, Central in 1929 until he resigned on medical advice in February 1941.

He served as Minister of Labour from 1937–38.

Shillington was a prosperous agricultural and builders' merchant.

== Personal life ==
Shillington and his wife Sarah Louisa (née Collen) lived at Ardeavon, Killycomain Road, Portadown, and had six children. The youngest was (Robert Edward) Graham Shillington, who would become the Chief Constable of Royal Ulster Constabulary. Son Thomas Graham Shillington served with the 9th Royal Irish Fusiliers, and was killed in action in 1917 aged 19, during the First World War. Victoria Cross recipient Lieutenant Geoffrey St. George Shillington Cather was the son of Shillington's sister.

== Sources ==
- http://www.election.demon.co.uk/stormont/biographies.html

Parliament of Northern Ireland
| New constituency | Member of Parliament for Armagh; 1921–1929 | Constituency abolished |
| New constituency | Member of Parliament for Armagh Central; 1929–1941 | Succeeded by George Dougan |
Political offices
| Preceded by J. M. Andrews | Minister of Labour; 1937–1938 | Succeeded by John Fawcett Gordon |
