= Royal Ulster Constabulary =

Police force of Northern Ireland (1922–2001)

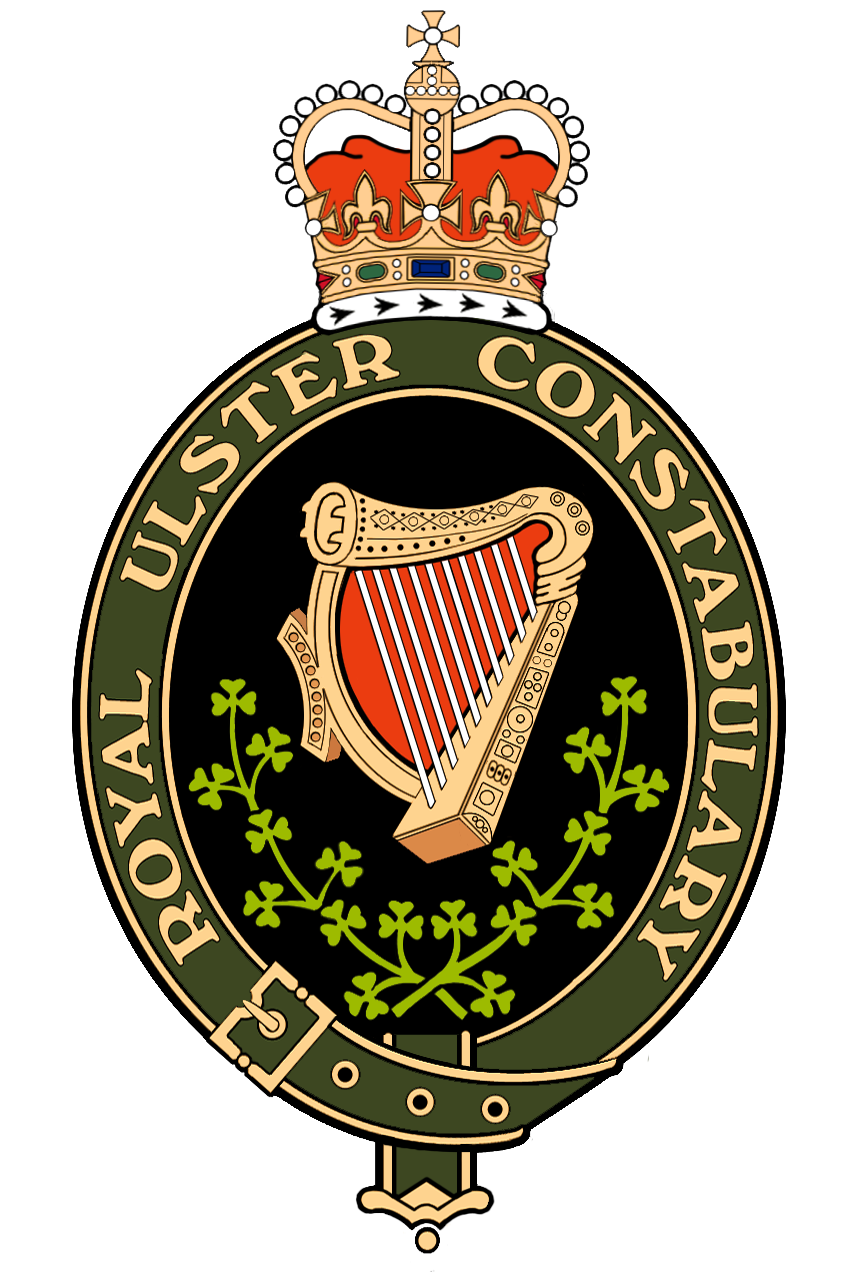
- Badge of the RUC

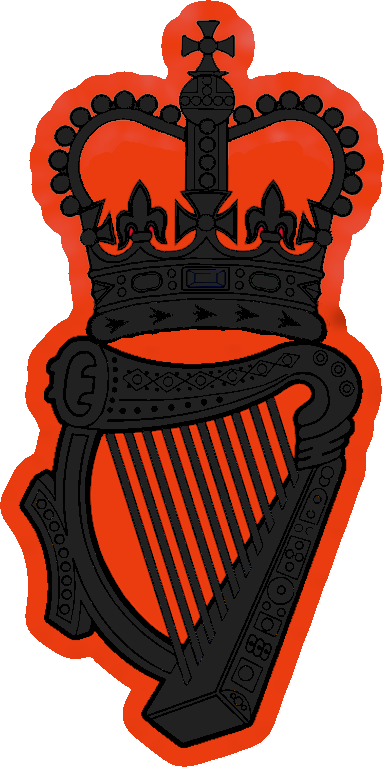
- Cap badge of the RUC from 1970 onwards

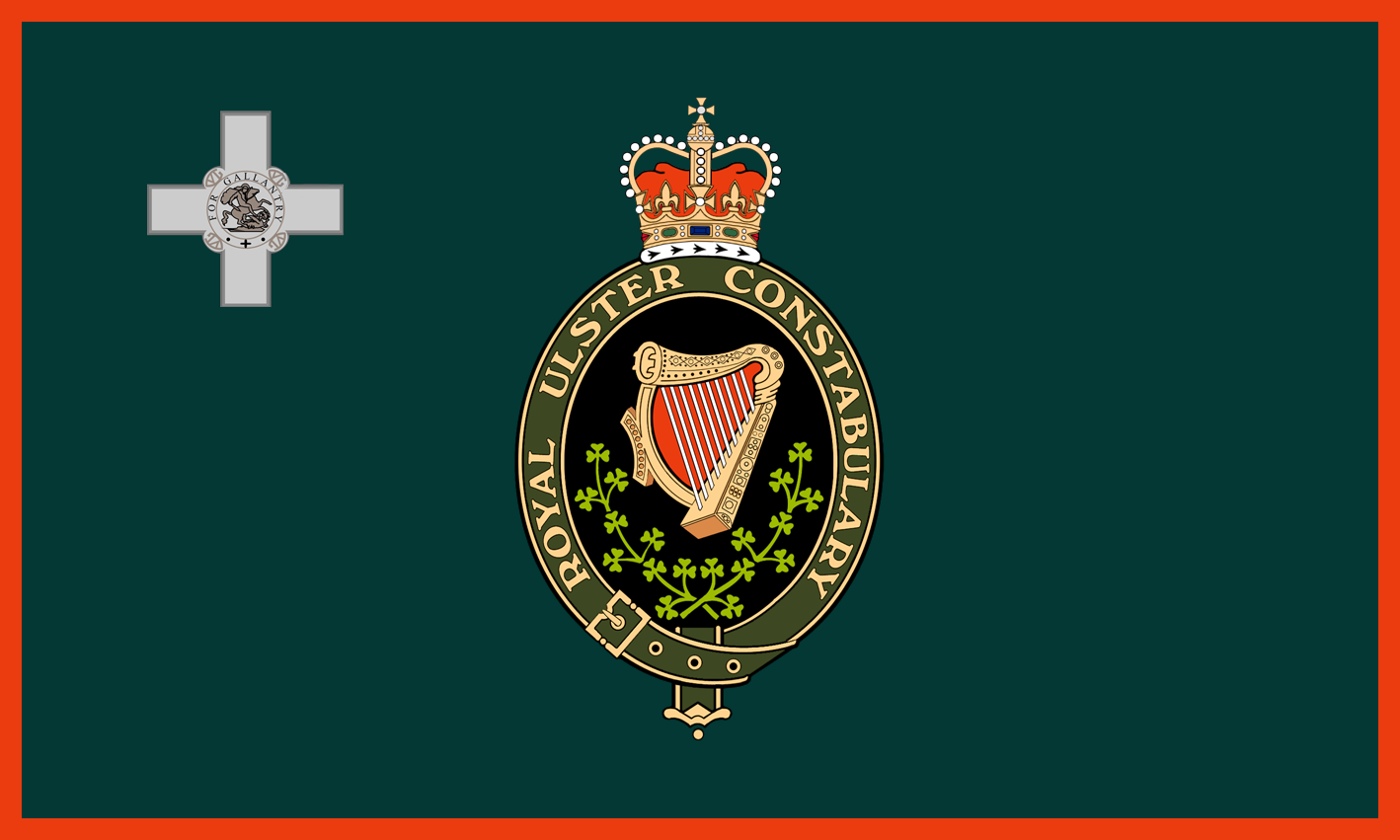
- Flag of the RUC
- Abbreviation: RUC

Agency overview
- Formed: 1 June 1922; 104 years ago
- Preceding agency: Royal Irish Constabulary
- Dissolved: 4 November 2001; 25 years ago
- Superseding agency: Police Service of Northern Ireland
- Legal personality: Police force

Jurisdictional structure
- National agency: Northern Ireland
- Operations jurisdiction: Northern Ireland
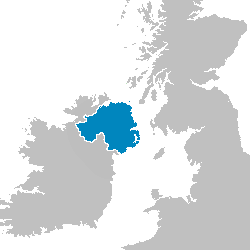
- Map of Royal Ulster Constabulary's jurisdiction
- Area: 14,130 km^{2} (5,460 sq mi)
- General nature: Local civilian police

The Royal Ulster Constabulary (RUC) (Note: Following the awarding of the George Cross (GC) in 2000, its supporters have appended post-nominal letters to the name, as Royal Ulster Constabulary, GC (abbreviated RUC GC or RUCGC).) was the police force of Northern Ireland from 1922 to 2001. It was founded on 1 June 1922 as a successor to the Royal Irish Constabulary (RIC) following the partition of Ireland. At its peak, the force had around 8,500 officers, with a further 4,500 who were members of the RUC Reserve.

The RUC policed Northern Ireland from the aftermath of the Irish War of Independence until after the turn of the 21st century and played a major role in the Troubles between the 1960s and the 1990s. Due to the threat from the Provisional Irish Republican Army (IRA), who saw the RUC as enforcing British rule, the force was heavily armed and militarised. Officers routinely carried submachine guns and assault rifles, travelled in armoured vehicles, and were based in heavily fortified police stations. It was the first police force to use rubber and plastic bullets for riot control.

The RUC's membership was overwhelmingly Protestant, leading to accusations by sections of the Catholic and Irish nationalist minority of one-sided policing and sectarianism. Officers were also accused of police brutality as well as collusion with loyalist paramilitaries. Conversely, it was praised as one of the most professional police forces in the world by British security forces. During the Troubles, 319 RUC officers were killed and almost 9,000 injured in paramilitary assassinations or attacks, mostly by the IRA, which made the RUC the most dangerous police force in the world in which to serve by 1983. In the same period, the RUC killed 55 people, 28 of whom were civilians. In 2000, the RUC was awarded the George Cross for bravery.

The RUC was superseded by the Police Service of Northern Ireland (PSNI) in 2001, as mandated by the final version of the Police (Northern Ireland) Act 2000. Allegations regarding collusion prompted several inquiries, the most recent of which was authored by Police Ombudsman Nuala O'Loan in 2007. The report identified police, CID and Special Branch collusion with loyalist terrorists, but no member of the RUC has been charged or convicted of any criminal acts as a result of these inquiries. O'Loan stated in her conclusions that there was no reason to believe the findings of the investigation were isolated incidents.

== History ==
=== Establishment ===
Under section 60 of the Government of Ireland Act 1920, Northern Ireland was placed under the jurisdiction of the Royal Irish Constabulary (RIC). On 31 January 1921, Richard Dawson Bates, the first Minister of Home Affairs for Northern Ireland, appointed a committee of inquiry on police organisation in the region. It was asked to advise on any alterations to the existing police force necessary for the formation of a new force (i.e. recruitment and conditions of service, composition, strength and cost).

Constabulary Act (Northern Ireland) 1922
- Act of Parliament
- Parliament of Northern Ireland
- Long title: An Act to provide for the establishment, management and control of the Royal Ulster Constabulary, and to amend the law with respect to the appointment of Resident Magistrates and Special Constables in Northern Ireland, and for purposes connected therewith.
- Citation: 12 & 13 Geo. 5. c. 8 (N.I.)

Dates
- Royal assent: 31 May 1922
Other legislation
Repealed by	Police (Northern Ireland) Act 1998

Status: Repealed

An interim report was published on 28 March 1922, the first official report of the new Parliament of Northern Ireland, and was subsequently accepted by the Northern Ireland Government. On 29 April 1922, King George V granted to the force the name Royal Ulster Constabulary (RUC). In May, the Parliament of Northern Ireland passed the Constabulary Act (Northern Ireland) 1922 (12 & 13 Geo. 5. c. 8 (N.I.)), and the RUC officially came into existence on 1 June. The headquarters of the force was established at Atlantic Buildings, Waring Street, Belfast. The uniform remained essentially the same as that of the RIC – a dark green, as opposed to the dark blue worn by the other British police forces and the Garda Síochána. A new badge of the Red Hand of Ulster on a St George's Cross surrounded by a chain was designed but proved unpopular and was never uniformly adopted. Eventually, the harp and crown insignia of the Order of St Patrick, as worn by the RIC, was adopted.

From the beginning the RUC had a dual role, unique among British police forces, of providing a normal law enforcement service while enforcing the new Northern Ireland entity in the face of considerable opposition, both armed and unarmed. To this end, its members were armed, as the RIC had been. The RUC was limited by statute to a 3,000-strong force. Initially, a third of positions within the force were reserved for Catholics, a reflection of the denominational proportions of the population of Northern Ireland at that time. The first two thousand places were filled quickly and those reserved for Catholics were filled mainly by ex-RIC members fleeing north. Due to reluctance by the political establishment to employ too many Catholics (who were seen as potentially disloyal to the Protestant and unionist ethos of the new government) the force abandoned this policy. As a result, representation of Catholics in the RUC never exceeded 20%. In addition, many Catholics who joined the force, particularly during the Troubles, were targeted for murder or ostracised by their own community. By the 1960s, representation of Catholics in the RUC had fallen to 12%.

The RUC were supported by the Ulster Special Constabulary, a volunteer body of part-time auxiliary police established before the Northern Ireland government was set up, who had already been given uniforms and training. The RUC's senior officer, the Inspector General, was appointed by the Governor of Northern Ireland and was responsible to the Minister of Home Affairs in the Northern Ireland government for the maintenance of law and order.

=== Early years ===
The polarised political climate in Northern Ireland resulted in violence from both sides of the political and sectarian divide. The lawlessness that affected the region during the early 1920s, and the problems it caused for the RUC, are indicated in a police report drawn up by District Inspector R. R. Spears in February 1923. Referring to the situation in Belfast after July 1921 he stated:

For twelve months after that, the city was in a state of turmoil. The IRA (Irish Republican Army) was responsible for an enormous number of murders, bombings, shootings and incendiary fires. The work of the police against them was, however, greatly hampered by the fact that the rough element on the Protestant side entered thoroughly into the disturbances, met murder with murder and adopted in many respects the tactics of the rebel gunmen. In the endeavour to cope simultaneously with the warring factions the police efforts were practically nullified. They were quite unable to rely on the restraint of one party while they dealt with the other.

About ninety police officers were killed between 1920 and 1922 in what would become Northern Ireland (see The Troubles in Northern Ireland (1920–1922)). The security forces were implicated in reprisal killings of Catholics but no convictions ever rendered. Most notable of these incidents were the McMahon killings on 26 March 1922, in which six Catholics were killed; and the Arnon Street killings several days later on 1 April 1922, in which six more Catholics were shot dead in retaliation for the IRA killing of a policeman. By the mid-1920s the situation had calmed down; for the next forty-five years the murder rate in Northern Ireland would be lower than in the rest of the UK and the crime detection rate higher.

The 1920s and 1930s were years of economic austerity. Many of Northern Ireland's traditional industries, notably linen and shipbuilding, were in recession, which contributed to the already high level of unemployment. Serious rioting broke out in 1932 in Belfast in protest at inadequate relief for the unemployed. In response to the growth of motorised transport, the RUC Traffic Branch was formed on 1 January 1930. In 1936 the police depot at Enniskillen was formally opened and an £800,000 scheme to create a network of 196 police barracks throughout Northern Ireland by rationalising or repairing the 224 premises inherited from the RIC was underway. In May 1937 a new white glass lamp with the RUC crest went up for the first time to replace the RIC crest still on many stations. About the same time the Criminal Investigation Department (CID) in Belfast was significantly expanded, with a detective head constable being appointed to head the CID force in each of the five Belfast police districts. There was sporadic IRA activity in the 1930s.

In 1937, on the occasion of the visit of King George VI and Queen Elizabeth to the province, the IRA blew up a number of customs posts. In 1939 the IRA launched its Sabotage Campaign in England, which would end a few days before the outbreak of the Second World War. The war brought additional responsibilities for the police: the security of the land border with the Republic of Ireland, which remained neutral during the war, was one important consideration; smuggling greatly increased due to rationing, to the point where police virtually became revenue officers; and many wartime regulations had to be enforced, including "black-out" requirements on house and vehicle lights, the arrest of striking workers, port security, and restrictions on the movement of vehicles and use of petrol.

The RUC was a "reserved occupation", i.e. the police force was deemed essential to the domestic war effort and its members were forbidden to leave to join the other services. The wartime situation gave a new urgency to discussions regarding the appointment of women police. The Ministry of Home Affairs finally gave approval to the enrolment of women as members of the RUC on 16 April 1943, with the first six recruits starting on 15 November, headed by Marion Paterson Macmillan, who transferred from the Metropolitan Police. Post-war policies brought about a gradual improvement in the lot of the RUC, interrupted only by a return to hostilities by the IRA border campaign from 1957 to 1962, in which seven RUC officers were killed. The force was streamlined in the 1960s, a new headquarters was opened at Knock, Belfast and a number of rural barracks were closed.

=== "The Troubles" ===
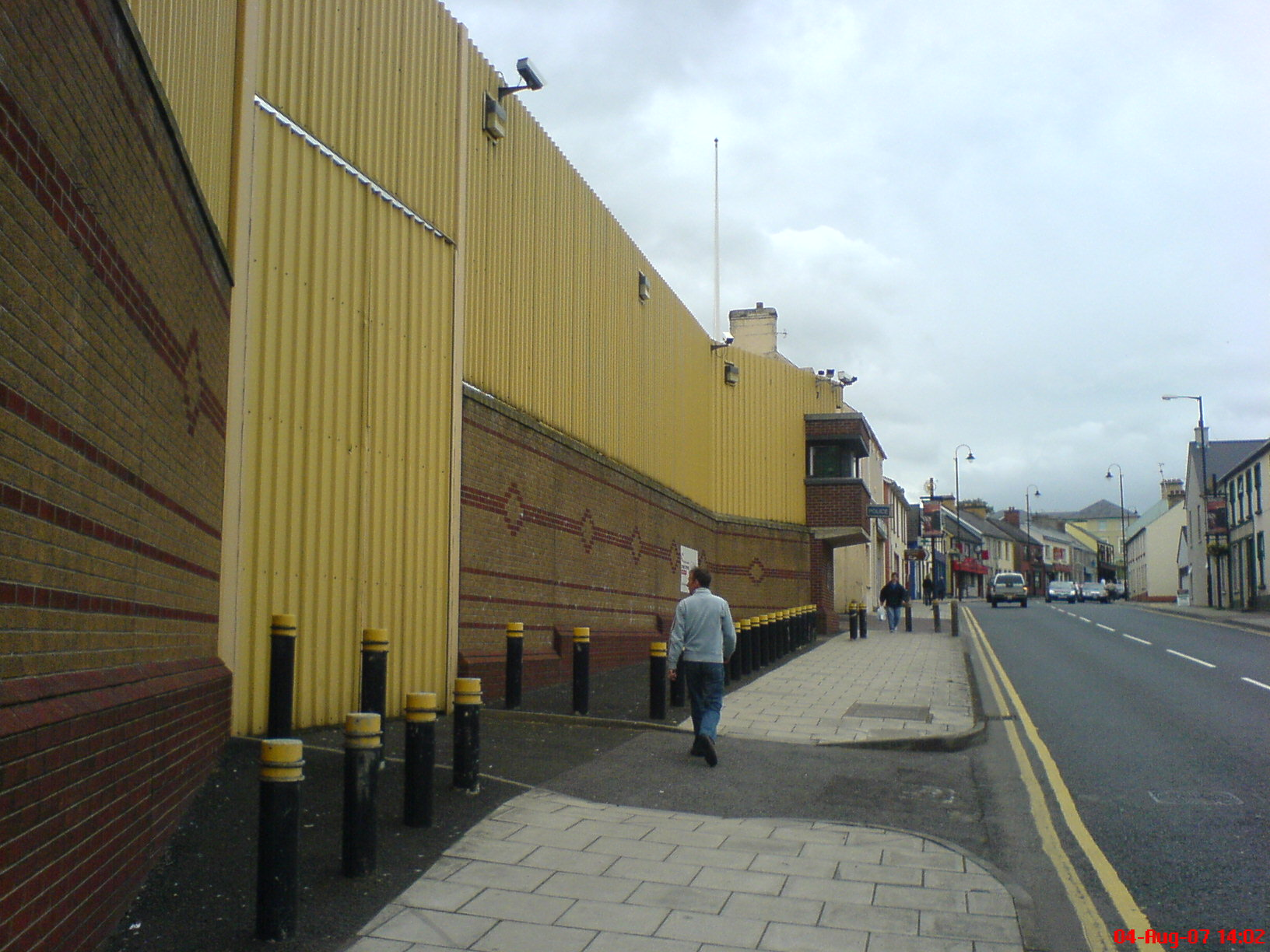
The fortifications of the RUC station in Dungiven in 2007.

The civil rights protests during the 1960s, and the reaction to them, marked the beginning of the conflict that became known as "the Troubles". The RUC found itself confronting marchers protesting against gerrymandering of local electoral wards and discrimination in local housing allocation. Many of these Northern Ireland Civil Rights Association protests were banned or truncated by the government of Northern Ireland. The Ulster Special Constabulary were controversial, with the unit seen by some nationalists as more anti-Catholic and anti-nationalist than the RUC, which, unlike the B Specials, did attract some Catholic recruits. The severe pressure on the RUC and the perceived partiality of the B-Specials led, during the Northern Ireland riots of August 1969, to the British Army being called in to support the civil administration under Operation Banner. Catholics largely turned away from the British Army, who they saw as treating Protestants differently, especially after the Falls Curfew.

=== Reform ===
The high level of civil unrest led to an exhaustive inquiry into the disturbances in Northern Ireland carried out by Lord Scarman, which produced a report in 1972. James Callaghan, Home Secretary in 1969, called on Brigadier John Hunt (Lord Hunt) to assess, advise and report on the policing situation. He was assisted in this task by Sir Robert Mark, who later became commissioner of the Metropolitan Police Service, and Sir James Robertson, then-chief constable of Glasgow. The Hunt Report was published on 3 October 1969, and most of its recommendations were subsequently accepted and implemented. The aim was to completely reorganise the RUC, both modernising the force and bringing it into line with the other police forces in the UK. This meant the introduction of the British rank and promotion structure, the creation of 12 police divisions and 39 sub-divisions, the disbandment of the Ulster Special Constabulary, and the creation of a police authority designed to be representative of all segments of the community.

Callaghan, later elected Prime Minister, asked Sir Arthur Young, commissioner of the City of London Police, to be seconded for a year. Young's appointment began the long process of turning the RUC into a British police service. The RUC Reserve was formed as an auxiliary police force, and all military-style duties were handed over to the newly formed Ulster Defence Regiment, which was under military command and replaced the B Specials. Callaghan selected Young, a career policeman, because no other British policeman could match his direct experience of policing acutely unstable societies and of reforming gendarmeries. from 1943 to 1945, he was director of public safety and director of security in the military government of Allied-occupied Italy. Later, he had been seconded to the Federation of Malaya at the height of the Malayan Emergency (1952–53) and to the crown colony of Kenya during the Mau Mau rebellion (1954).

=== First deaths ===
The first deaths of the Troubles occurred in July 1969. Francis McCloskey, a 67-year-old Catholic civilian, had been found unconscious on 13 July near the Dungiven Orange Hall following a police baton charge against a crowd who had been throwing stones at the hall. Witnesses later said they had seen police batoning a figure in the doorway where McCloskey was found, although police claimed that he had been unconscious before the baton charge and may have been hit with a stone. He was taken to hospital and died the following day.

On 11 October 1969, Constable Victor Arbuckle was shot dead by loyalists on Belfast's Shankill Road during serious rioting in protest at the recommendations of the Hunt Report. Arbuckle was the first police fatality of the Troubles. In August 1970, two young constables, Donaldson and Millar, died when an abandoned car they were examining near the strongly republican town of Crossmaglen exploded. They became the first security forces victims of the Provisional Irish Republican Army campaign. This campaign involved the targeting of police officers, and continued until the final ceasefire in 1997, as the peace process gained momentum. The last RUC officer killed, Constable Francis O'Reilly (a Catholic), was also killed by loyalists, in a September 1998 bombing during the Drumcree conflict.

=== Later years ===
In March 1972, the Government of Northern Ireland resigned and the parliament was prorogued. Northern Ireland subsequently came under direct rule from Westminster with its own Secretary of State, who had overall responsibility for security policy. From the mid-1970s onward, the British policy of Ulsterisation meant RUC officers taking a more prominent role in the conflict than previously, which increased their casualty rate. Starting in late 1982, a number of IRA and Irish National Liberation Army (INLA) men were shot dead by the RUC. This led to accusations of a shoot-to-kill policy by the RUC. In September 1983, four officers were charged with murder in connection with the deaths. Although all were subsequently found not guilty, the British government set up the Stalker Inquiry to investigate further. In May 1986, Sir John Hermon, then Chief Constable, publicly accused unionist politicians of "consorting with paramilitary elements".

Anger over the Anglo-Irish Agreement led to loyalist assaults on more than 500 homes belonging to Catholics and RUC officers during the mid-1980s. At least 150 RUC families were forced to move as a result. In 1998 Chief Constable Ronnie Flanagan stated in an interview on television that he was unhappy with any RUC officers belonging to the Orange Order or any of the other loyal orders. While the RUC refused to give any details on how many officers were members of the Order, thirty-nine RUC officers are listed on the Order's Roll of Honour (of 'Orangemen' killed in the conflict). The size of the RUC was increased on several occasions. At its height, there were 8,500 regular police officers supported by about 5,000 full-time and part-time reserve officers, making it the second largest force in the United Kingdom after the Metropolitan Police in London. The direction and control of the RUC was in the hands in the Chief Constable, who was assisted by two Deputy Chief Constables and nine Assistant Chief Constables. For operational purposes, Northern Ireland was divided into twelve Divisions and thirty-nine Sub-Divisions. RUC ranks, duties, conditions of service and pay were generally in line with those of police forces in Great Britain.

== Policing in a divided society ==
Policing Northern Ireland's divided society proved to be difficult, as each of the main religious blocs (Protestant and Roman Catholic) had different attitudes towards the institutions of the state. To most Ulster Protestants, the state had full legitimacy, as did its institutions, its parliament, its police force and the Crown. Many of Northern Ireland's Catholics, along with their political leaders, believed that partition would be only temporary. Many abstained from and/or refused to take part in Northern Ireland's institutions for a variety of reasons, including the treatment of Catholic civilians by the Ulster Special Constabulary during the recent conflict and the mistaken belief that Northern Ireland would be ceded to the Free State in the not too distant future. Protestant fears of strategically important government services being infiltrated by Catholics disloyal to the new state polarised society and made most Catholics unwilling and/or unable to join either the police or the civil service.

This mindset was referenced by David Trimble:

Ulster Unionists, fearful of being isolated on the island, built a solid house, but it was a cold house for Catholics. And northern nationalists, although they had a roof over their heads, seemed to us as if they meant to burn the house down

In August 1922, Dawson Bates gave the Orange Order special permission for an Orange Lodge to be formed in the RUC. In April 1923 he spoke at its first reunion. In 1924 John William Nixon, a District Inspector suspected of involvement in the murder of Catholic civilians, would be dismissed after widespread complaints that he had made a "fiercely Unionist" speech at an Orange Order function. An inquiry by the British National Council for Civil Liberties in 1936 concluded that:

[I]t is difficult to escape the conclusion that the attitude of the government renders the police chary of interference with the activities of the Orange Order and its sympathisers.

On 4 April 1922, the RIC was disbanded. Three days later, the Civil Authorities (Special Powers) Act (Northern Ireland) 1922 came into force, and the Belfast government, although prohibited from raising or controlling a military force, appointed Major General Frederick Solly-Flood as a military advisor. The RUC was to be 3,000-strong, recruiting 2,000 ex-RIC and 1,000 "A Specials". It was intended that half of the RIC men recruited were to be Catholic, making up a third of positions within the force. However, fewer than half the expected number of Catholics came forward and the balance was made up with more A Specials, who continued to exist as a separate force.

Over the years, republican political leaders and most Roman Catholic clerics discouraged Catholics from joining the RUC. Seamus Mallon, Social Democratic and Labour Party Member of Parliament (MP) and critic of the force, who later served as Deputy First Minister of Northern Ireland, stated that the RUC was "97% Protestant and 100% unionist". The RUC did attract some Roman Catholics, mostly former members of the RIC, who came north from the Irish Free State after the bitterness of the fighting during the Anglo-Irish War largely precluded them from remaining in territory now controlled by their enemies. The percentage of Catholics in the RUC dropped as these men retired over time.

Notable Catholics in the RUC include RUC Chief Constable Sir James Flanagan, who survived an IRA assassination attempt; Deputy Chief Constable Michael McAtamney; Assistant Chief Constable Cathal Ramsey; Chief Superintendent Frank Lagan, and Superintendents Kevin Benedict Sheehy and Brendan McGuigan. In December 1997, The Independent (London) published a leaked internal RUC document which reported that a third of all Catholic RUC officers had reported suffering religious discrimination and/or harassment from Protestant fellow officers.

== Casualties ==
According to The Thin Green Line – The History of the Royal Ulster Constabulary GC, written by RUC reservist Richard Doherty, 314 officers were killed and over 9,000 were injured during the existence of the RUC. All but 12 of the dead were killed during the Troubles (1969 to 1998), of whom 277 were killed in attacks by Irish republicans. According to the CAIN project at the University of Ulster, however, 301 RUC officers and 18 former or retired RUC officers were killed, totalling 319 fatalities.

The Newry mortar attack by the Provisional IRA on an RUC station in 1985, which killed nine officers (including two Catholics), resulted in the highest number of deaths inflicted on the RUC in one incident. The two highest-ranking RUC officers to be killed during "the Troubles" were Chief Superintendent Harry Breen and Superintendent Robert Buchanan, who were ambushed by the Provisional IRA South Armagh Brigade outside Jonesborough, County Armagh, on 20 March 1989. On 4 December 2013, in a report by judge Peter Smithwick in the Smithwick Tribunal (a public inquiry), it was alleged that members of the Republic's police force (Garda Síochána) had colluded in the killing of the two policemen. The last RUC officer killed as a direct result of the conflict, Francis O'Reilly (a Catholic constable), died on 6 October 1998, a month after he had been injured in a Red Hand Defenders pipe-bomb attack in Portadown during the Drumcree conflict.

== Criticism ==
=== Ill-treatment of children ===
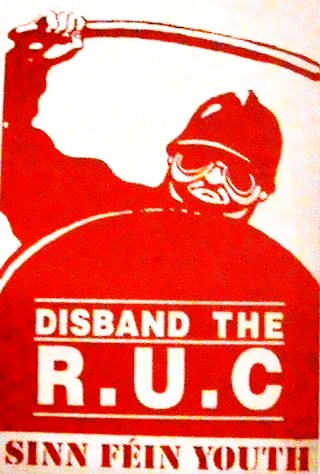
An Ógra Shinn Féin propaganda sticker calling for the RUC to be disbanded

On 1 July 1992, Human Rights Watch (HRW) issued a detailed report, alleging RUC and paramilitary violations against children's rights during the Troubles. Both Catholic and Protestant children alleged regular and severe physical assault and mental harassment at the hands of RUC officers, usually conducted to force a false confession of a crime. In an accompanying statement, HRW cited allegations that:

Police officers and soldiers harass young people on the street hitting, kicking and insulting them. Police officers in interrogation centres insult, trick and threaten youngsters and sometimes physically assault them. Children are locked up in adult detention centres and prisons in shameful conditions. Helsinki Watch heard dozens of stories from children, their parents, lawyers, youth workers and political leaders of children being stopped on the street and hit, kicked and abused again and again by police and soldiers. And seventeen-year-olds told Human Rights Watch Helsinki of severe beatings in detention during interrogations by police.

=== Patten report ===
The Good Friday Agreement (GFA) of 1998 produced a wholesale reorganisation of inter-community, governmental and policing systems, including a power-sharing executive. The bias, and the under-representation of Catholics and nationalists in the RUC led to, as part of the Good Friday Agreement, a fundamental policing review, headed by Chris Patten, a former British governor of Hong Kong and Conservative minister under Margaret Thatcher. The review was published in September 1999. It recommended a wholesale reorganisation of policing, with the Royal Ulster Constabulary being replaced by the Police Service of Northern Ireland (PSNI), and a drive to recruit Catholics and the adoption of a new crest and cap badge. The PSNI was introduced in November 2001. As part of the change, the police service dropped the word "Royal" from and adopted a new badge that included the crown, harp, and shamrock, an attempt at representation of the major ideologies.

=== Loyalist collusion ===
==== Special Patrol Group ====
The Special Patrol Group was formed in the late 1960s as the Police Reserve Force. The name was changed to avoid confusion with the newly formed part-time Police Reserve in 1970, and was renamed "Divisional Mobile Support Unit" in 1980 after two of its members were convicted of kidnap and murder. The two, John Weir and Billy McCaughey, implicated some of their colleagues in a range of crimes including giving weapons, information and transport to loyalist paramilitaries as well as carrying out shooting and bombing attacks of their own. Weir alleged that senior officers, including Chief Superintendent Harry Breen, were aware of and approved of their activity.

==== The Stevens Inquiries ====
On 18 April 2003 as part of the third report into collusion between Ulster loyalist paramilitaries, RUC, and British Army, Sir John Stevens published an overview and recommendations document (Stevens 3). Stevens' intention was to make recommendations which arose from serious shortcomings he had identified in all three Inquiries. In his autobiography, Stevens was at pains to point out the high regard in which he held many RUC officers, including Detective Superintendent Maurice Neilly, who was killed in the 1994 Chinook air crash.

The third Stevens Inquiry began in 1999, and referred to his previous reports when making his recommendations. Stevens' third inquiry focused in detail on only two of the killings in which collusion was alleged; that of Brian Adam Lambert in 1987 and of Pat Finucane in 1989. Stevens used the following criteria as a definition of collusion while conducting his investigation:

- The failure to keep records or the existence of contradictory accounts which could limit the opportunity to rebut serious allegations.
- The absence of accountability which could allow acts or omissions by individuals to go undetected.
- The withholding of information which could impede the prevention of crime and the arrest of suspects.
- The unlawful involvement of agents in murder which could imply that the security forces sanction killings.

On 12 December 2012, the British Prime Minister David Cameron admitted a statement to the House of Commons that "shocking levels of collusion occurred in the murder of Finucane."

==== Police Ombudsman ====
In a report released on 22 January 2007, the Police Ombudsman Dame Nuala O'Loan stated Ulster Volunteer Force (UVF) informers committed serious crimes, including murder, with the full knowledge of their handlers. The report stated that RUC Special Branch officers created false statements, blocked evidence searches and "baby-sat" suspects during interviews.

== Awards ==
Awards for gallantry for individual officers since 1969 included 16 George Medals, 103 Queen's Gallantry Medals, 111 Queen's Commendations for Bravery and 69 Queen's Police Medals.

On 12 April 2000, the RUC was awarded the George Cross for bravery, a rare honour which had been awarded collectively only once before, to the island nation of Malta. The Award stated:

For the past 30 years, the Royal Ulster Constabulary has been the bulwark against, and the main target of, a sustained and brutal terrorism campaign. The Force has suffered heavily in protecting both sides of the community from danger – 302 officers have been killed in the line of duty and thousands more injured, many seriously. Many officers have been ostracised by their own community and others have been forced to leave their homes in the face of threats to them and their families. As Northern Ireland reaches a turning point in its political development this award is made to recognise the collective courage and dedication to duty of all of those who have served in the Royal Ulster Constabulary and who have accepted the danger and stress this has brought to them and to their families.

== Chief officers ==
The chief officer of the Royal Irish Constabulary was its inspector-general (the last of whom, Sir Thomas J. Smith served from 11 March 1920 until partition in 1922). Between 1922 and 1969 the position of inspector-general of the RUC was held by five officers, the last being Sir Arthur Young, who was seconded for a year from the City of London Police to implement the Hunt Report. Under Young, the title was changed to chief constable in line with the recommendations of the Hunt Report. Young and six others held the job until the RUC was incorporated to the PSNI. The final incumbent, Sir Ronnie Flanagan, became the first chief constable of the PSNI.

- Inspector-General Sir Charles Wickham, from June 1922.
- Inspector-General Sir Richard Pim, from August 1945.
- Inspector-General Sir Albert Kennedy, from January 1961.
- Inspector-General Sir Anthony Peacocke, from February 1969.
- Inspector-General Sir Arthur Young, from November 1969.
- Chief Constable Sir Graham Shillington, from November 1970.
- Chief Constable Sir James Flanagan, from November 1973.
- Chief Constable Sir Kenneth Newman, from May 1976.
- Chief Constable Sir John Hermon, from January 1980.
- Chief Constable Sir Hugh Annesley, from June 1989.
- Chief Constable Sir Ronnie Flanagan, from October 1996 – November 2001, continuing as chief constable of the PSNI until April 2002

== Ranks ==
Ranks 1922–1930
Ranks 1922–1930	Inspector-general	Deputy inspector-general	County inspector		District inspector 1st class	District inspector 2nd class	District inspector 3rd class	Head constable major	Head constable	Sergeant	Constable	
Ranks 1922–1930	(insignia of a brigadier)	(insignia of a colonel)						(insignia of a sergeant-major)	(crown above sergeant's stripes)			
Ranks 1930–1970
Ranks 1930–1970	Inspector-general	Deputy inspector-general	Commissioner	County inspector	District inspector 1st class	District inspector 2nd class	District inspector 3rd class	Head constable major	Head constable	Sergeant	Constable	
Ranks 1930–1970	(insignia of a lieutenant-general)	(insignia of a major-general)	(insignia of a brigadier)	(insignia of a colonel)				(insignia of a sergeant-major)	(crown above sergeant's stripes)			
Ranks 1970–2001
Ranks 1970–2001	Chief constable	Deputy chief constable	Assistant chief constable	Chief superintendent	Superintendent	Chief inspector	Inspector	Sergeant			Constable	Reserve constable

== Equipment ==
=== Firearms ===
- Webley Revolver .38
- Ruger Security-Six .357
- Walther PP 7.65 mm
- Smith & Wesson Model 59 9 mm
- Sterling submachine gun 9 mm
- Ruger AC-556 5.56 mm
- L1A1 Self-Loading Rifle 7.62 mm
- M1 carbine .30
- Heckler & Koch MP5 9 mm
- Lee–Enfield .303
- Lewis gun .303
- Vickers machine gun .303
- M1919 Browning machine gun .30

== George Cross Foundation ==
The Royal Ulster Constabulary GC Foundation was established by virtue of the Police (Northern Ireland) Act 2000 for the purpose of "marking the sacrifice and honouring the achievements of the Royal Ulster Constabulary".
