= Lancelot Curran =

Major Sir Lancelot Ernest Curran (8 March 1899 – 20 October 1984) was a Northern Ireland High Court judge and parliamentarian.

He was elected as Ulster Unionist Member of Parliament for Carrick in the Stormont Parliament serving from 1945 to 1949, and was Parliamentary Secretary to the Minister of Finance (Chief Whip) (17 July 1945 – 12 June 1947).

Curran was Attorney General for Northern Ireland (6 June 1947 – 4 November 1949), the youngest in the history of that parliament. He was a member of the Orange Order and became a member of the Privy Council of Northern Ireland.

== Murder of Patricia Curran ==
Lancelot and Doris Curran had three children: Michael, Patricia and Desmond. Desmond became a barrister and latterly a Roman Catholic convert and missionary in South Africa.

On 12 November 1952 Patricia, aged 19, and a student at Queen's University, Belfast, was murdered. Her body was found in the driveway of the Curran home, Glen House, Whiteabbey, County Antrim. She had been stabbed thirty-seven times.

A 20 year old RAF technician, Iain Hay Gordon, who had met Patricia at the Presbyterian church they both attended, was convicted of her murder. His sentence was overturned in 2000 after the Northern Ireland Court of Appeal found it to be unsafe.

Scapegoat, a BBC Northern Ireland drama about the conviction of Hay Gordon, was broadcast in 2009.

== Famous trials ==
Curran presided over the trial of Robert McGladdery for the murder of 19-year-old Pearl Gamble, near Newry, in 1961. McGladdery protested his innocence but was found guilty and hanged at Crumlin Road jail in Belfast on 20 December 1961; it was the last hanging in Northern Ireland.

A fictionalized account of the trial and execution of McGladdery, Orchid Blue, was written by Eoin McNamee and published in 2010 (McNamee had previously written a Booker Prize-nominated novel, Blue Tango, about the murder of Patricia Curran).

Another McNamee novel, Blue Is The Night (published in 2014), deals with Curran's involvement in a murder trial in the Northern Ireland of the late 1940s.

== Later years and death ==
Sir Lancelot's first wife, Lady Doris Curran, died on 29 May 1975. He remarried, to Margaret Pearce a year later. He died in Sussex in 1984.

Parliament of Northern Ireland
Preceded by John Dermot Campbell	Member of Parliament for Carrick; 1945–1950	Succeeded by Alexander Hunter
Party political offices
Preceded by Sir Wilson Hungerford	Unionist Chief Whip; 1945–1947	Succeeded by Walter Topping
Political offices
Preceded by Sir Wilson Hungerford	Parliamentary Secretary to the Ministry of Finance; 1945–1947	Succeeded by Walter Topping
Preceded by William Lowry	Attorney General for Northern Ireland; 1947–1949	Succeeded by Edmond Warnock
