= Joseph McConnell =

Joseph McConnell may refer to:

- Joseph C. McConnell (1922–1954), United States Air Force pilot
- Sir Joseph McConnell, 2nd Baronet (1877–1942), Member of Parliament (MP) for Antrim, 1929–1942
- Joe McConnell (1939–2018), American sports announcer
