= Austin Ardill =

Northern Irish unionist politician (1917–2010)

Constitutional Convention Member for South Antrim
- In office 1975–1976
- Preceded by: New convention
- Succeeded by: Convention dissolved

Deputy leader of Ulster Vanguard
- In office 1972–1974
- Preceded by: New party
- Succeeded by: Ernest Baird

Member of the Northern Ireland Assembly for South Antrim
- In office 28 June 1973 – 1974
- Preceded by: New assembly
- Succeeded by: Assembly abolished

Member of the Parliament of Northern Ireland for Carrick
- In office 25 November 1965 – 24 February 1969
- Preceded by: Alexander Hunter
- Succeeded by: Anne Dickson

Personal details
- Born: 1917 Belfast, Northern Ireland
- Died: 12 October 2010 (age 93)
- Party: Ulster Unionist
- Other political affiliations: Ulster Vanguard (1972-1974)

Captain Robert Austin Ardill MC (1917 – 12 October 2010) was a Northern Irish unionist politician.

== Biography ==
Ardill was born in Belfast and educated at Coleraine Academical Institution. He later worked as the managing director of a feedstuffs company. He served in the Royal Irish Fusiliers from 1939 to 1946, winning the Military Cross for his bravery on the Greek island of Leros and retiring as a captain. He was a prisoner of war for 18 months before being freed by Allied troops after the D-Day landings. He also served as chairman of the Irish Temperance League.

After the war he became involved with the Ulster Unionist Party (UUP) and was elected as a member of Larne Rural District Council. In 1965 he was elected as a member of the Parliament of Northern Ireland, representing Carrick. He was opposed to the political reform programme of the Prime Minister Terence O'Neill and as a result lost the UUP nomination for Carrick in 1969 to Anne Dickson.

Subsequently, he became involved in the Ulster Vanguard movement, as one of its deputy leaders. The movement was opposed to any further reforms which would threaten the status quo. When the movement broke away from the UUP to form a separate political party, Ardill chose to remain with the UUP.

In 1973, Ardill was elected to the Northern Ireland Assembly, representing South Antrim. Although he signed the pledge to support the former Prime Minister Brian Faulkner, he changed sides after the election to oppose the Sunningdale Agreement. Ardill was courted by the Democratic Unionist Party and considered switching to that party before ultimately deciding to remain an Ulster Unionist. He was re-elected for South Antrim in the Constitutional Convention election of 1975.

In September 1979 he stood in the UUP leadership election but lost to James Molyneaux.

In the wake of the Anglo-Irish Agreement in 1985, he became involved in the Charter Group, a pressure group within the UUP which had the restoration of devolution as its main objective and accepted an Irish dimension in Northern Ireland politics. A close friend of Rev Martin Smyth, Ardill would briefly return to politics in the late 1990s when he joined Smyth in campaigning against the Belfast Agreement.

== Personal life ==
His wife Molly Ardill later served on Carrick Borough council as a UUP, Independent Unionist and Conservative councillor, reaching the post of deputy mayor.

Betty Orr, his daughter, was a schoolteacher who upon her retirement received praise for her work at the school where she taught and for building cross community links.

== Burial ==
He was buried after a ceremony in the Holy Trinity Church of Ireland in Carrickfergus.

Parliament of Northern Ireland
Preceded by Alexander Hunter	Member of Parliament for Carrick; 1965–1969	Succeeded by Anne Dickson
Northern Ireland Assembly (1973)
New assembly	Assembly Member for South Antrim; 1973–1974	Assembly abolished
Northern Ireland Constitutional Convention
New convention	Member for South Antrim; 1975–1976	Convention dissolved
Political offices
New political party	Deputy Leader of Ulster Vanguard; 1972–1973; With: Martin Smyth	Succeeded by Ernest Baird; Lindsay Smyth
