= William Ellison-Macartney =

British politician (1852–1924)

The Right Honourable Sir William Ellison-Macartney KCMG
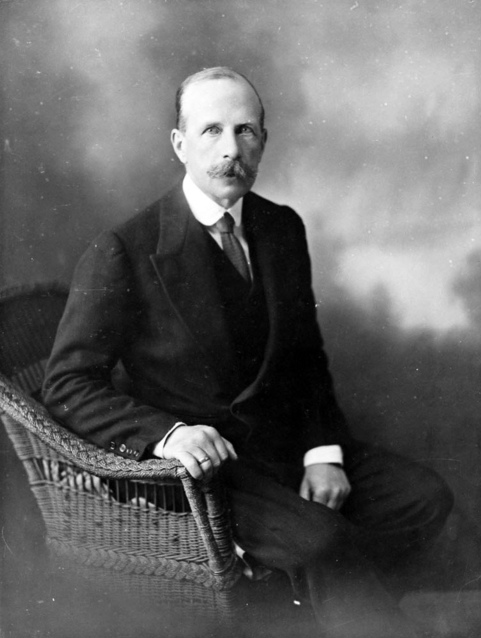

11th Governor of Tasmania
- In office 4 June 1913 – 31 March 1917
- Monarch: George V
- Premier: Albert Solomon; John Earle; Walter Lee
- Preceded by: Sir Henry Barron
- Succeeded by: Sir Francis Newdegate

Member of Parliament for Antram South
- In office 18 December 1885 – 3 February 1903
- Preceded by: Position established
- Succeeded by: Charles Craig

17th Governor of Western Australia
- In office 9 April 1917 – 9 April 1920
- Monarch: George V
- Premier: Frank Wilson; Henry Lefroy; Hal Colebatch; James Mitchell
- Preceded by: Sir Henry Barron
- Succeeded by: Sir Francis Newdegate

Personal details
- Born: William Grey Ellison; 7 June 1852 Dublin, County Dublin, Ireland
- Died: 4 December 1924 (aged 72) Chelsea, London, England
- Spouse: Ettie Myers Scott
- Education: Eton College
- Alma mater: Exeter College, Oxford

Sir William Grey Ellison-Macartney, KCMG (7 June 1852 – 4 December 1924) was a British politician, who also served as the Governor of the Australian states of Tasmania and Western Australia.

== Early life ==
Born as William Grey Ellison in Dublin, Ireland, he was the son of John William Ellison, the Conservative Member of Parliament for County Tyrone in the British House of Commons. His father changed the family surname to Ellison-Macartney in 1859, as a condition of an inheritance from a maternal uncle.

Ellison-Macartney was educated at Eton College and Exeter College, Oxford, taking an early interest in law and politics, and was called to the Bar in 1878. He was an ardent supporter of Irish Unionism, and became grand secretary of the Orange Institution in Ireland.

== Political career ==
At the 1885 UK general election, Ellison-Macartney ran for the House of Commons, and was elected as Conservative member for the newly created constituency of South Antrim. In January 1886, he convened a meeting which led to the formation of the Irish Unionist Party, for which he served as whip.

In 1895, Ellison-Macartney was appointed as Parliamentary and Financial Secretary to the Admiralty, holding the post until 1890, when a cabinet reshuffle resulted in the appointment of Liberal Unionist H. O. Arnold-Forster. As a consolation, Ellison-Macartney was appointed to the Privy Council.

By 1900, Ellison-Macartney's political fortunes had waned: his popularity in his constituency of South Antrim had dropped considerably due to his reluctance to dispense favour upon Antrim during his time as a junior minister, and he was criticised by the Belfast newspaper The News Letter.

Hoping to reassert his place in the loyalist hierarchy, Ellison-Macartney led a "law-and-order" campaign, targeted in particular at the violence and agrarian crime committed by William O'Brien's United Irish League. He retired from politics in early February 1903, after being offered several government appointments.

== Government postings ==
Ellison-Macartney was appointed Deputy-Master of the Royal Mint in January 1903, serving to 1913, and was High Sheriff of Antrim in 1908.

=== Governor of Tasmania ===
In December 1912, Ellison-Macartney was knighted as a Knight Commander of the Order of St Michael and St George (KCMG), and appointed Governor of the Australian state of Tasmania. There was considerable concern over his appointment from Irish nationalists, who felt that Ellison-Macartney's Unionist political background may cause offence to Tasmanians who supported Irish Home Rule.

In 1914, Ellison-Macartney presided over a constitutional dispute in the Tasmanian House of Assembly. With the Labor and Liberal parties close to deadlock in the parliament, he granted an early election to the Liberal Premier of Tasmania, Albert Solomon. The Liberals gained an extra seat needed to retain power, but lost one in a subsequent by-election. Ellison-Macartney declined Solomon's request for another dissolution of parliament, and he called upon Labor's John Earle to form government, on the condition that an election be called. With Earle and his ministry sworn in, neither side desired to hold an election so parliament remained in session, with Ellison-Macartney's recommendations over-ridden by the Secretary of State for the Colonies.

=== Governor of Western Australia ===
Like Sir Harry Barron before him, and Sir Francis Newdegate after him, Ellison-Macartney was transferred as governor from Tasmania to Western Australia. His term in Western Australia was not a happy one – his critical comments about Tasmanian politicians had made Western Australians wary of his attitude, and he had to deal with the state's post-First World War economic depression and continued objection to his Unionist stance from those supportive of Irish Home Rule.

Ellison-Macartney returned to England after a three-year term. He died in Chelsea, London, aged 72.

== Freemasonry ==
Ellison-Macartney was a freemason. He was initiated into the craft on 6 June 1872 in the Apollo University Lodge No. 357 the day before his twentieth birthday. In 1877, when he returned to Ireland, he became a member of the Lodge Cappagh No. 350 and then of the Concord Lodge No. 332. Finally, he became a founder of the new Border Lodge No. 482 on 25 April 1889. When he was appointed Governor of Tasmania, he agreed to become Grand Master of the Grand Lodge of Tasmania and was installed on 19 February 1914. He was also made Grand Master of the Grand Lodge of Western Australia during his term as the state's governor. He was also a member of the Apprentice Boys of Derry Parent Club, being initiated on the 12th of August 1877.

== Family ==
Ellison-Macartney was the son of John William Ellison and Elizabeth Phoebe Ellison, née Porter. On 5 August 1897, he married Ettie Myers Scott at Holcombe, Somerset, and they had three children: daughters Phoebe (b.1898) and Mildred (b.1900) and a younger son John; Phoebe died in 1918, aged 20, as a result of a riding accident while the family lived were living in Perth, Australia. Ettie was the sister of Robert Falcon Scott, the Antarctic explorer.

Parliament of the United Kingdom
New constituency	Member of Parliament for South Antrim; 1885–1903	Succeeded by Charles Craig
Political offices
Preceded by Sir Ughtred Kay-Shuttleworth, Bt	Parliamentary and Financial Secretary to the Admiralty; 1895–1900	Succeeded by H. O. Arnold-Forster
Government offices
Preceded by Sir Harry Barron	Governor of Tasmania; 1913–1917	Succeeded by Sir Francis Newdegate
Preceded by Sir Harry Barron	Governor of Western Australia; 1917–1920	Succeeded by Sir Francis Newdegate
