= 1974 Ulster Unionist Party leadership election =

← 1971	1974	1979 →
Candidate	Harry West
Leader before election
Brian Faulkner
Elected Leader
Harry West

The 1974 Ulster Unionist Party leadership election took place on 22 January 1974, as a result of incumbent Brian Faulkner's resignation on 7 January 1974 because of difficulty in achieving agreement to the setting up of an all-Ireland council. The election resulted in Harry West succeeding Faulkner as Leader of the UUP.
