= Charles Craig (British politician) =

British politician

Charles Craig PC (Ire) PC (NI)
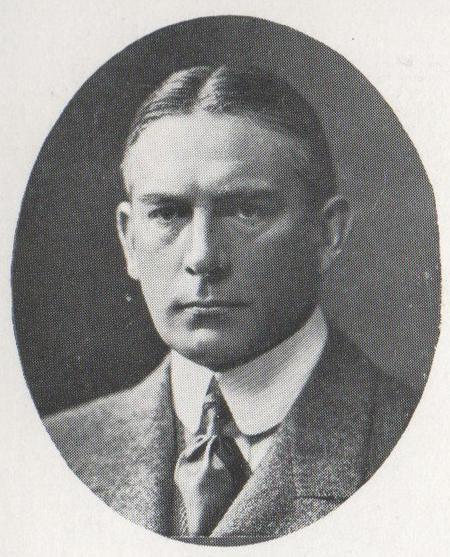
- Craig, c. 1910s

Member of Parliament for South Antrim
- In office 1903–1922 Serving with Hugh O'Neill
- Preceded by: William Ellison-Macartney
- Succeeded by: Constituency abolished

Member of Parliament for Antrim
- In office 1922–1929
- Preceded by: New constituency
- Succeeded by: Joseph McConnell; Hugh O'Neill

Personal details
- Born: Charles Curtis Craig; 18 February 1869
- Died: 28 January 1960 (aged 90)
- Party: Irish Unionist
- Spouse: Lilian Wimble
- Relations: James Craig (brother)
- Parent: James Craig (father)

Charles Curtis Craig PC (Ire) PC (NI) (18 February 1869 – 28 January 1960) was an Irish Unionist and later Ulster Unionist politician. He was Member of Parliament (MP) for constituencies in County Antrim from 1903 to 1929, taking his seat in the House of Commons of the United Kingdom.

== Early life ==
Craig was the son of James Craig, of Craigavon, Belfast, a self-made millionaire whisky distiller. Among his brothers was Northern Ireland's first Prime Minister, James Craig. He was a solicitor in Belfast before he was invited to be a parliamentary candidate.

== 1903 South Antrim by-election ==
Craig first stood for Parliament at a by-election in 1903 for the South Antrim constituency, after the sitting Unionist MP William Ellison-Macartney had left the Commons to take up the post of Deputy-Master of the Royal Mint. He defeated a Russellite opponent to win the seat.

1903 South Antrim by-election
Party	Candidate	Votes	%	±%
Irish Unionist	Charles Craig	4,464	55.25	+0.86
Russellite Unionist	Samuel Robert Keightley	3,615	44.75	+44.75
Majority		849	10.51	+1.73
Turnout		10,236	78.93	+13.86
Irish Unionist hold		Swing	N/A	

Craig held the seat through four subsequent general elections.

== Antrim constituency ==
The South Antrim constituency was abolished for the 1922 general election and Craig was then elected as one of the two MPs for the re-established Antrim constituency, and held that seat until he retired from Parliament at the 1929 general election.

Craig was sworn as a member of the Privy Council of Ireland on 5 December 1922, one of two new members admitted on the last day before the Anglo-Irish Treaty came into effect, on 6 December 1922. Although it was never formally abolished, the Irish Privy Council effectively ceased to exist with the creation of the Irish Free State, and on 12 December, ten members were sworn of a new Privy Council of Northern Ireland. Craig was not one of those first appointments, but was appointed on 27 Sep 1923 as the thirteenth member of the Privy Council of Northern Ireland.

In the 1922–1924 Conservative Government, led by Bonar Law and then Stanley Baldwin, Curtis was appointed in February 1923 as Parliamentary Secretary to the Minister for Pensions, and held that post until first Labour government took office in January 1924.

== Personal life ==
Craig married Lilian Bowring Wimble, daughter of the John Wimble, of Long Ditton, Surrey in 1897.

Parliament of the United Kingdom
Preceded by William Ellison-Macartney	Member of Parliament for South Antrim; 1903 – 1922	Constituency abolished
New constituency	Member of Parliament for Antrim; 1922 – 1929; With: Hugh O'Neill	Succeeded by Joseph McConnell; Hugh O'Neill
