= Sir Robert McConnell, 1st Baronet =

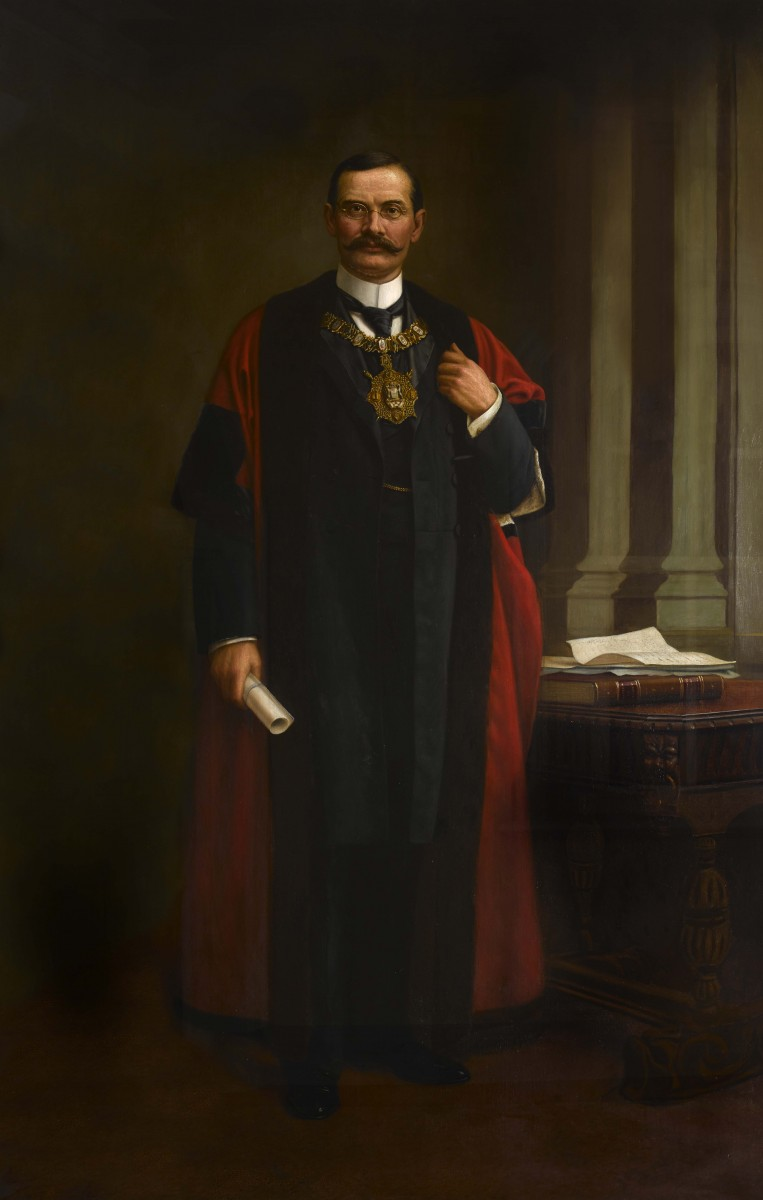
Sir Robert McConnell as Lord Mayor

Sir Robert John McConnell, 1st Baronet (6 February 1853 – 22 April 1927) was created baronet in 1900, and served as Lord Mayor of Belfast 1900–1901.

== Biography ==
Robert John McConnell was the son of Joseph McConnell (1829–1872) of Clougher, County Antrim, and Elizabeth McConnell (née McBride). He was born on 6 February 1853.

McConnell set up in business as a rent agent in 1874, opening an office in Lombard Street, Belfast. The firm prospered, and with his brother Thomas, he became a prominent property developer, building small terraced houses in poorer sections of the city, and larger, speculative developments in more affluent suburbs.

The area behind Queen's University, popularly known as the Holyland, with its biblically named streets, was so named after McConnell, a devout Christian, returned from a visit to Carmel, Damascus, Cairo, Jerusalem and Palestine with his developer friend James Rea in the 1890s.

In 1900 McConnell was elected Lord Mayor of Belfast, and the same year was made baronet by Queen Victoria on the occasion of her visit to Dublin. McConnell served one term, and Sir Daniel Dixon was elected in 1901. He also served as a magistrate and Deputy Lieutenant for County Antrim.

== Personal life ==
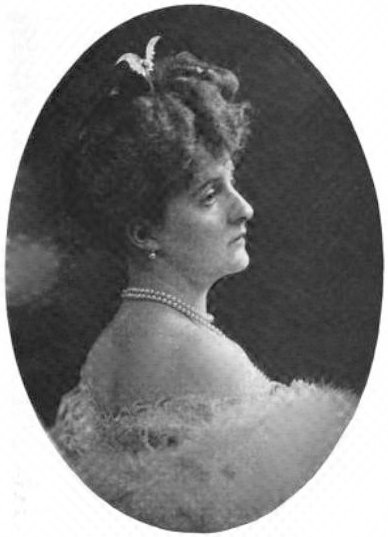
Elsie Hewson in The Sketch, 5 August 1903

McConnell married Mary Smiley in 1874. Together they had nine children, six of whom survived infancy, including Joseph (1877-1942) who became the second Baronet. Another son, William, joined the 3rd Battalion, Royal Irish Rifles, and was killed in action in World War II. The family resided at The Moat, Strandtown, Belfast.

After Mary's death, McConnell married Elsie Hewson in 1897. The two divorced in 1905. He died in 1927.

== Legacy ==
R J McConnell & Co, estate agents, continued trading under the leadership of his son, Sir Joseph McConnell and later his grandson, Sir R M Terence McConnell. In 1973 the firm amalgamated with Ephraim Brown & Son, another long-standing development company which had been established by rent agent Ephraim Brown in 1854. Since 2010, the firm has traded as McConnell Chartered Surveyors.

== Arms ==
Coat of arms of Sir Robert McConnell, 1st Baronet

Notes
Confirmed 18 June 1900 by Sir Arthur Edward Vicars, Ulster King of Arms.
Crest
A stag's head erased Azure attired Or and charged with a bee erect of the last.
Escutcheon
Per pale Azure and Gules in the dexter a ship in full sail Proper in the sinister an arm embowed Argent the hand holding a trefoil slipped Or on a chief of the fourth three stags' heads cabossed Sable.
Motto
Victor In Arduis

Civic offices
Preceded by Otto Jaffe	Lord Mayor of Belfast; 1900 – 1901	Succeeded by Daniel Dixon
Baronetage of the United Kingdom
New creation	Baronet (of The Moat); 1900 – 1927	Succeeded by Joseph McConnell
