= Anne Dickson =

Northern Irish politician (born 1928)

Leader of the Unionist Party of Northern Ireland
- In office 1976–1981
- Preceded by: Brian Faulkner
- Succeeded by: Office abolished

Member of the Northern Ireland Constitutional Convention for South Antrim
- In office 1975–1976

Member of the Northern Ireland Assembly for South Antrim
- In office 1973–1974

Member of Parliament for Carrick
- In office 1969–1973
- Preceded by: Austin Ardill
- Succeeded by: Parliament abolished

Personal details
- Born: April 18, 1928 (age 97) London, England
- Party: Unionist Party NI (1974 - 1981); Independent Unionist (1972 - 1974)
- Other political affiliations: Ulster Unionist (until 1972)

Anne Letitia Dickson CBE (born 18 April 1928) is a former Northern Irish Unionist politician.

== Background ==
Born in London, she moved with her family to Northern Ireland at an early age and was educated at Holywood and Richmond Lodge School. After service as the Chair of the Northern Ireland Advisory Board of the Salvation Army she became actively involved in politics for the Ulster Unionist Party. Elected as chair of the Carrick Division Unionist Association she later became a member of the Newtownabbey Urban District Council; serving as vice-chair of the council from 1967 to 1969.

She was then elected as an Ulster Unionist politician for the Carrick constituency in the Parliament of Northern Ireland at Stormont as a supporter of the prime minister Terence O'Neill. After the dissolution of the Stormont Parliament, she was elected in the 1973 Assembly election for South Antrim as an Independent Unionist candidate having resigned from the UUP in 1972. After the Ulster Unionist party split in 1973/4 over the Sunningdale agreement she joined the newly formed Unionist Party of Northern Ireland (UPNI) along with other supporters of the former Northern Ireland prime minister Brian Faulkner. She retained her seat in South Antrim in the 1975 constitutional convention election. After the retirement of Brian Faulkner she became leader of the Unionist Party of Northern Ireland (UPNI) in 1976, becoming the first woman to lead a major political party in Northern Ireland. In 1979 she contested the Belfast North constituency in the Westminster election, polling 10% of the vote, the best performance by a UPNI candidate in Northern Ireland, however, her intervention was sufficient to split the moderate Unionist vote resulting in the seat being gained by the DUP. The UPNI disbanded in 1981 after poor results in the local government elections that year and Dickson retired from active politics. Subsequently, she was chair of the Northern Ireland Consumer Council from 1985 to 1990. She was appointed CBE in the 1990 Birthday Honours.

Parliament of Northern Ireland
Preceded by Austin Ardill	Member of Parliament for Carrick; 1969–1973	Parliament abolished
Northern Ireland Assembly (1973)
New assembly	Assembly Member for South Antrim; 1973–1974	Assembly abolished
Northern Ireland Constitutional Convention
New convention	Member for South Antrim; 1975–1976	Convention dissolved
Political offices
Preceded by Brian Faulkner	Leader of the Unionist Party of Northern Ireland; 1976–1981	Position abolished
