= Pile baronets of Kenilworth House (1900) =

Pile baronets
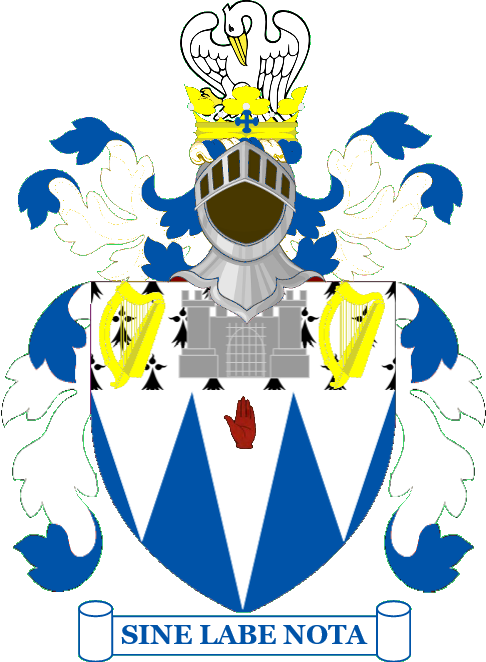
- Coats of arms the Pile baronets of Kenilworth House
- Creation date: 1900
- Status: extant
- Motto: Sine Labe Nota, Known without a stain
- Arms: Azure three piles Argent on a chief Ermine a castle Proper between two harps Or
- Crest: On a crest coronet Or charged with a cross bourdonée Azure a pelican with wings endorsed and inverted Proper.

The Pile baronetcy, of Kenilworth House in Rathgar in the County of Dublin, was created in the Baronetage of the United Kingdom on 24 September 1900 for Thomas Devereux Pile, Lord Mayor of Dublin in 1900.

His son the 2nd Baronet, was a General in the Royal Tank Corps. As of 2026 the title is held by the latter's grandson, the 4th Baronet.

== Pile baronets, of Kenilworth House (1900) ==
- Sir Thomas Devereux Pile, 1st Baronet (1856–1931)
- Sir Frederick Alfred Pile, 2nd Baronet (1884–1976)
- Sir Frederick Devereux Pile, 3rd Baronet (1915–2010)
- Sir Anthony John Devereux Pile, 4th Baronet (born 1947), nephew of the 3rd Baronet.

The heir apparent is the present holder's son Thomas Charles Devereux Pile (born 1978).

== Notes ==
Baronetage of the United Kingdom
| Preceded by Wrightson baronets | Pile baronets of Kenilworth House; 24 September 1900 | Succeeded by McConnell baronets |
