= 1971 Ulster Unionist Party leadership election =

← 1969	1971	1974 →
Candidate	Brian Faulkner	William Craig
Popular vote	26	4
Percentage	86.7%	13.3%
Leader before election
James Chichester-Clark
Elected Leader
Brian Faulkner

The 1971 Ulster Unionist Party leadership election was caused by the resignation of James Chichester-Clark, after he had failed to persuade the British Government to provide his government with more resources to quell the growing civil unrest.

== Candidates ==
- Brian Faulkner - Minister for Development and long term leadership hopeful
- William Craig - MP for Larne who had been a critic of the leadership since he believed Terence O'Neill to have demoted him in 1968. Craig was to leave the Ulster Unionist Party and created the Vanguard Unionist Progressive Party in 1972.

== Results ==
Candidate	Total	
Candidate	Votes	%
Brian Faulkner ✓	26	86.7
William Craig	4	13.3
Total	30	100

== Sources ==
- Ireland since 1939, Henry Patterson (2001, Oxford University Press)
- A history of the Ulster Unionist Party, Graham Walker (2004, Manchester University Press)
