= Carrick (Northern Ireland Parliament constituency) =

Constituency of the Northern Ireland Parliament (1929–1973)

- Former County constituency for the Parliament of Northern Ireland
- Carrick shown within Northern Ireland

Former constituency
- Created: 1929
- Abolished: 1973
- Election method: First past the post

Carrick was a single-member county constituency of the Parliament of Northern Ireland.

== Boundaries and Boundary Changes ==
This was a division of County Antrim. Before 1929 it was part of the seven-member Antrim constituency. The constituency elected one MP to the House of Commons of Northern Ireland from 1929 until the Parliament was temporarily suspended in 1972, and then formally abolished in 1973.

In terms of the then local government areas the constituency in 1929 comprised parts of the rural districts of Antrim, Belfast and Larne. The division also included the whole of the urban districts of Ballyclare and Carrickfergus.

After boundary changes in 1969, the constituency included parts of the rural districts of Antrim and Larne, the borough of Carrickfergus, the urban district of Ballyclare and part of the urban district of Carrickfergus.

== Members of Parliament ==
Election	Member	Party
1929	John Fawcett Gordon	Ulster Unionist Party
1933	John Fawcett Gordon	Ulster Unionist Party
1943	John Dermot Campbell	Ulster Unionist Party
1945	Lancelot Curran	Ulster Unionist Party
1945	Lancelot Curran	Ulster Unionist Party
1949	Lancelot Curran	Ulster Unionist Party
1950	Alexander Hunter	Ulster Unionist Party
1953	Alexander Hunter	Ulster Unionist Party
1958	Alexander Hunter	Ulster Unionist Party
1962	Alexander Hunter	Ulster Unionist Party
1965	Austin Ardill	Ulster Unionist Party
1969	Anne Dickson	Ulster Unionist Party
1973	Constituency abolished	

== Elections ==
The parliamentary representatives of the division were elected using the first past the post system.

General Election 22 May 1929: Antrim Carrick
Party	Candidate	Votes	%	±%
UUP	John Fawcett Gordon	Unopposed	N/A	
UUP win (new seat)				

General Election 30 November 1933: Antrim Carrick
Party	Candidate	Votes	%	±%
UUP	John Fawcett Gordon	Unopposed	N/A	N/A
UUP hold		Swing	N/A	

General Election 9 February 1938: Antrim Carrick
Party	Candidate	Votes	%	±%
UUP	John Fawcett Gordon	Unopposed	N/A	N/A
UUP hold		Swing	N/A	

- Resignation of Gordon

By-Election 19 April 1943: Antrim Carrick
Party	Candidate	Votes	%	±%
UUP	John Dermot Campbell	5,612	64.30	N/A
NI Labour	William Calwell	3,116	35.70	New
Majority		2,496	28.60	N/A
Turnout		21,716	40.19	N/A
UUP hold		Swing	N/A	

- Death of Campbell

By-Election 19 April 1945: Antrim Carrick
Party	Candidate	Votes	%	±%
UUP	Lancelot Curran	6,905	71.58	N/A
NI Labour	William Calwell	2,741	28.42	N/A
Majority		4,164	43.17	N/A
Turnout		21,069	45.78	N/A
UUP hold		Swing	N/A	

General Election 14 June 1945: Antrim Carrick
Party	Candidate	Votes	%	±%
UUP	Lancelot Curran	9,387	70.26	N/A
NI Labour	William Calwell	3,973	29.74	N/A
Majority		5,414	40.52	N/A
Turnout		19,811	67.44	N/A
UUP hold		Swing	N/A	

General Election 10 February 1949: Antrim Carrick
Party	Candidate	Votes	%	±%
UUP	Lancelot Curran	Unopposed	N/A	N/A
UUP hold		Swing	N/A	

- Resignation of Curran on appointment as a Justice of the High Court

By-Election 20 January 1950: Antrim Carrick
Party	Candidate	Votes	%	±%
UUP	Alexander Hunter	Unopposed	N/A	N/A
UUP hold		Swing	N/A	

General Election 22 October 1953: Antrim Carrick
Party	Candidate	Votes	%	±%
UUP	Alexander Hunter	9,726	66.73	N/A
NI Labour	Vivian Simpson	4,849	33.27	New
Majority		4,877	33.46	N/A
Turnout		26,063	55.92	N/A
UUP hold		Swing	N/A	

General Election 20 March 1958: Antrim Carrick
Party	Candidate	Votes	%	±%
UUP	Alexander Hunter	Unopposed	N/A	N/A
UUP hold		Swing	N/A	

General Election 31 May 1962: Antrim Carrick
Party	Candidate	Votes	%	±%
UUP	Alexander Hunter	10,397	55.71	N/A
NI Labour	Bob Kidd	8,265	44.29	New
Majority		2,132	11.42	N/A
Turnout		37,059	50.36	N/A
UUP hold		Swing	N/A	

General Election 25 November 1965: Antrim Carrick
Party	Candidate	Votes	%	±%
UUP	Austin Ardill	12,129	66.37	
NI Labour	Bob Kidd	6,146	33.63	
Majority		5,983	32.74	
Turnout		40,031	45.65	
UUP hold		Swing		

- Boundary changes

General Election 24 February 1969: Antrim Carrick
Party	Candidate	Votes	%	±%
UUP	Anne Dickson	9,529	64.49	
Ind. Unionist	James Craig	5,246	35.51	New
Majority		4,283	28.99	
Turnout		22,905	64.51	
UUP hold		Swing		

- Parliament prorogued 30 March 1972 and abolished 18 July 1973
