= 1903 South Antrim by-election =

UK parliamentary by-election

The 1903 South Antrim by-election was held after the sitting Unionist MP William Ellison-Macartney had left the Commons to take up the post of Deputy-Master of the Royal Mint. It was retained by the Unionist candidate Charles Craig.

== Vacancy ==
The by-election was caused by the resignation in January 1903 of the sitting Unionist MP, William Ellison-Macartney, after he had been appointed Deputy-Master of the Royal Mint.

Ellison-Macartney had been the only member of parliament for the constituency since it was created in 1885. By the early 1900s, his popularity in the constituency had dropped considerably due to his reluctance to dispense favour upon Antrim during his time as a junior minister, and he was criticised by the Belfast newspaper The News Letter. A resignation for a government position was a dignified way for the government to help him out of this predicament. He later became a colonial governor.

== Electoral history ==
Ellison-Macartney was first elected when the constituency was created in 1885, and was re-elected unopposed four times. In the 1900 election there was an independent opponent, but Ellison-Macartney won convincingly with a 9 percent margin.

1900 general election: South Antrim
Party	Candidate	Votes	%	±%
Irish Unionist	William Ellison-Macartney	3,674	54.39	N/A
Ind. Unionist	Samuel Lawther	3,081	45.61	New
Majority		593	8.78	N/A
Turnout		6,755	65.07	N/A
Registered electors		10,381		
Irish Unionist hold		Swing	N/A	

== Candidates and campaign ==
The Unionists considered several candidates, but nominated Charles Craig, a solicitor from Belfast. Craig was supported by the Church of Ireland, and was a member of the Orange Institution.

His opponent was Dr. Samuel Robert Keightley, a Russellite who was the nominee of the Ulster Farmers′ and Labourers′ Union. Thomas Russell was himself present in the constituency to campaign on his behalf. He was also backed by the previous independent unionist candidate, Samuel Lawther (who was by 1903 High Sheriff of Belfast).

== Polling and result ==
1903 South Antrim by-election
Party	Candidate	Votes	%	±%
Irish Unionist	Charles Craig	4,464	55.25	+0.86
Russellite Unionist	Samuel Robert Keightley	3,615	44.75	+44.75
Majority		849	10.50	+1.72
Turnout		8,079	78.93	+13.86
Registered electors		10,236		
Irish Unionist hold		Swing	N/A	

Craig held the seat through four subsequent general elections.
