= McConnell baronets =

Baronetcy in the Baronetage of the United Kingdom

The McConnell baronetcy, of The Moat in Strandtown in Belfast, is a title in the Baronetage of the United Kingdom. It was created on 25 September 1900 for Robert McConnell, Lord Mayor of Belfast in 1900.

The 2nd Baronet sat as Unionist member of parliament for Antrim. The 4th Baronet did not use his title.

The title is currently marked "vacant" on the Official Roll.

== McConnell baronets, of The Moat (1900) ==
- Sir Robert John McConnell, 1st Baronet (1853–1927)
- Sir Joseph McConnell, 2nd Baronet (1877–1942)
- Sir Robert Melville Terence McConnell, 3rd Baronet (1902–1987)
- (Robert) Shean McConnell, 4th Baronet (1930–2021)
- (Terence) Reade McConnell, 5th Baronet (1959–2025)
- James Alexander McConnell, presumed 6th Baronet (born 1989)

== Extended family ==
Brian McConnell, Baron McConnell, son of Alfred McConnell, second son of the 1st Baronet, was a Stormont politician.

Baronetage of the United Kingdom
Preceded by Pile baronets	McConnell baronets of The Moat; 25 September 1900	Succeeded by Mitchell-Thomson baronets
