= John Dermot Campbell =

British politician

John Ernest Dermot Campbell DL (20 January 1898 – 23 January 1945) was a Northern Irish businessman and Ulster Unionist Member of Parliament in both United Kingdom and Northern Ireland Parliaments. He was killed during the Second World War in a plane crash.

Born in Randalstown, son of R. Garrett Campbell, Campbell was educated at Lockers Park School, Wellington College, and the Royal Military Academy, Woolwich. He joined the Royal Artillery late in World War I, serving in Palestine from 1918 to 1919, retiring as Lieutenant.

After his army service Campbell turned his attention to business and politics in Northern Ireland. He became the managing director of two flax spinning companies; Henry Campbell and Co., and Messrs Laverty and Co. Ltd and was appointed Deputy Flax Controller for Northern Ireland in 1940.

An Ulster Unionist, he was appointed as Chairman of Carrickfergus Urban District Council. In a by-election of 11 February 1943 he was elected as Member of the United Kingdom Parliament for Antrim, succeeding his father-in-law Sir Joseph McConnell who had died the previous year. On 26 August 1943 in a byelection following the resignation of John Fawcett Gordon, he was elected to the Northern Ireland Parliament as member for Carrick. He held these posts until death aged 46 in 1945 when his plane crashed in the Adriatic Sea during a parliamentary fact finding visit to Italy.

He was also a Deputy Lieutenant for Belfast and was appointed High Sheriff of Antrim in 1942. He married on 12 February 1930 Josephine Patricia McConnell, daughter of Sir Joseph McConnell, 2nd Baronet, who was his predecessor as MP for Antrim, and had two sons and a daughter.

Parliament of Northern Ireland
Preceded by John Fawcett Gordon	Member of Parliament for Carrick; 1943–1945	Succeeded by Lancelot Curran
Parliament of the United Kingdom
Preceded by Sir Joseph McConnell, Bt; Hugh O'Neill	Member of Parliament for Antrim; 1943 – 1945; With: Hugh O'Neill	Succeeded by Samuel Gillmor Haughton; Hugh O'Neill
