= Wrightson baronets =

Baronetcy in the Baronetage of the United Kingdom

The Wrightson baronetcy, of Neasham Hall in the County of Durham, is a title in the Baronetage of the United Kingdom. It was created on 13 July 1900 for the Conservative politician Thomas Wrightson. He represented Stockton and St Pancras East in the House of Commons. The 3rd Baronet was a Colonel in the Army.

== Wrightson baronets, of Neasham Hall (1900) ==
Wrightson baronets
- Crest: In front of a saltire Gules a unicorn salient Or.
- Shield: Or a fess invected chequy Azure and Argent between two eagles' heads erased in chief Sable and a saltire couped in base Gules.
- Motto: Veritas Omnia Vincit

- Sir Thomas Wrightson, 1st Baronet (1839–1921)
- Sir Thomas Garmondsway Wrightson, 2nd Baronet (1871–1950)
- Sir John Garmondsway Wrightson, 3rd Baronet (1911–1983)
- Sir Charles Mark Garmondsway Wrightson, 4th Baronet (born 1951)

The heir apparent is the present holder's son Barnaby Thomas Garmondsway Wrightson (born 1979).

== Notes ==
Baronetage of the United Kingdom
| Preceded by Lawson baronets | Wrightson baronets of Neasham Hall; 13 July 1900 | Succeeded by Pile baronets |
