= 1943 Antrim by-election =

UK Parliamentary by-election

The 1943 Antrim by-election was held on 11 February 1943. The by-election was held due to the death of the incumbent UUP MP, Joseph McConnell. It was won by the UUP candidate John Dermot Campbell.

== Result ==
By-Election 11 February 1943: Antrim
Party	Candidate	Votes	%	±%
UUP	John Dermot Campbell	42,371	69.40	N/A
NI Labour	Robert Getgood	17,253	28.26	New
Progressive Unionist	Reginald Hanson Press	1,432	2.35	New
Majority		25,118	41.14	N/A
Turnout		135,795	44.96	N/A
UUP hold		Swing	N/A	
