= Ettie Ellison-Macartney =

British Australian philanthropist (1863–1938)

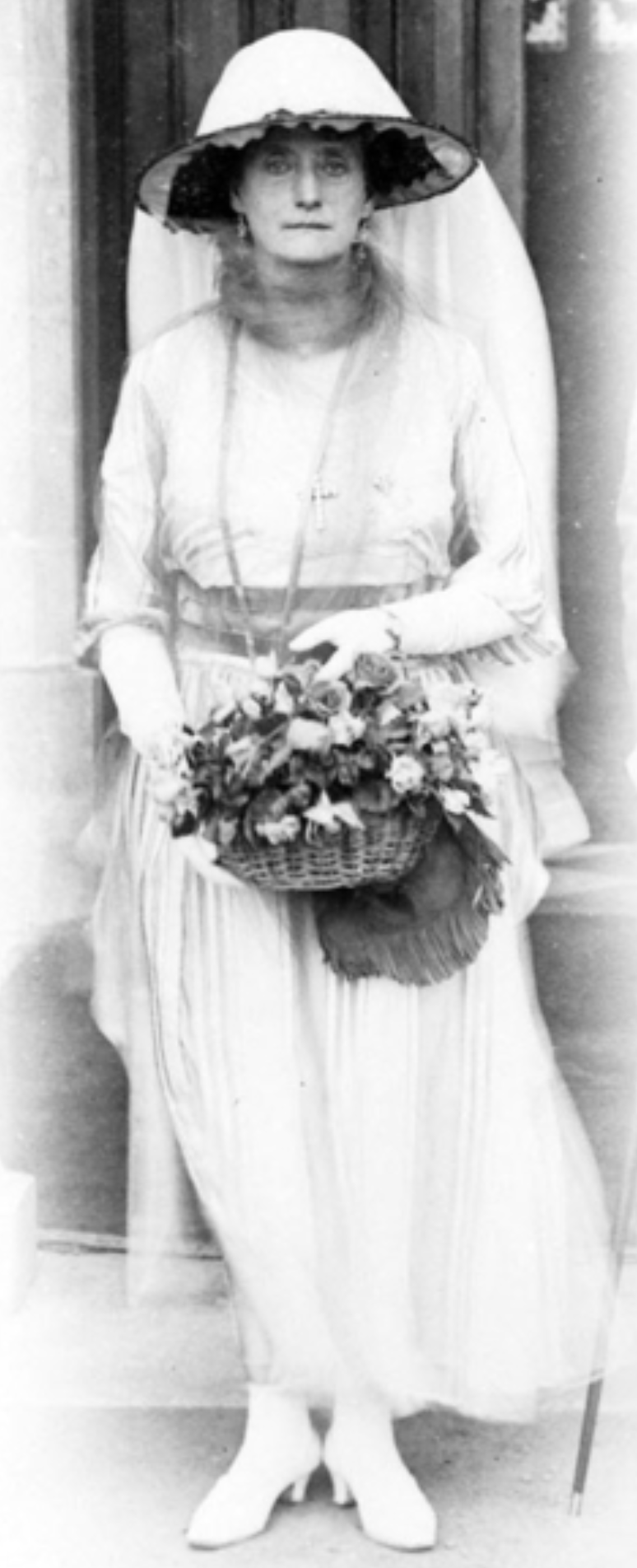
- Born: Ettie Myers Scott; April 1863; Devon, England
- Died: 27 November 1938 (aged 75); Putney Vale England
- Known for: Founder and inaugural president of the Tasmainian division of the Australian Red Cross
- Spouse: William Grey Ellison-Macartney
- Relatives: Robert Falcon Scott (brother)

Ettie, Lady Ellison-Macartney (born Ettie Myers Scott; April 1863 – 27 November 1938) was the founder and president of the Tasmanian division of the Australian Red Cross, at the start of World War I and was the second president of the Western Australian branch from 1917 until 1920.

== Early life and personal life ==
Ellison-Macartney was born Ettie Myers Scott to Hannah Cuming and John Edward Scott in Devon England. Her brother was Captain Robert Falcon Scott who died on the Terra Nova Expedition to the Antarctic in 1912.

After the death of her paternal grandfather in 1863 Ellison-Macartney’s family inherited a brewery and a house near Devonport called Outlands. In the next decade they were forced to sell the brewery and lease out Outlands. In 1894 the family moved to Holcombe House as her father had a job as a manager of a brewery near Shepton Mallet in Somerset.

In 1897 on 5 August, Ellison-Macartney married William Grey Ellison-Macartney. They had three children, Phoebe, Esther, and Jack. Her daughter Phoebe was killed in a riding accident when she was 20 years of age in 1918. William was appointed a Knight Commander of the Most Distinguished Order of St Michael and St George In December 1912.

Ellison-Macartney played tennis and golf, and she enjoyed gardening. She had an interest in nursing, and completed an ambulance course, and visited hospitals in London before travelling to Australia, so that she could pass on her observations. She had a strong appreciation of the outdoors, including sleeping out in the open air. On one family holiday in Sussex during the summer of 1911, her whole household spent five weeks living and sleeping in their gardens. She said of her interest in gardening "[...] we've been enthusiastic horticulturists since long before the time it was fashionable to take something beyond a polite interest in one's ground."

== Career ==
When World War I broke out in August 1914, Lady Helen Munro Ferguson wrote to Ellison-Macartney to appoint her as a member of the newly formed central branch of the Australian Red Cross, and to invite her to form and preside over the Tasmanian division as its president. At this time, Ellison-Macartney's husband had been the Governor of Tasmania for a little over a year. Ellison-Macartney accepted the invitation, and formed the branch, and presided over it, stating it was "a very interesting and absorbing task". She stated that considering that the type of work that women were undertaking through volunteering for the Red Cross had previously been outside of their lives "It was amazing to see the rapidity and thoroughness with which the women grappled with the work and grasped its scope and effectiveness".

In early 1917 she travelled to England with one of her daughter and collaborated with the commissioners of the Australian Red Cross, visiting and the headquarters on Victoria Street in Westminster, and then inspecting the two depots in London city, and assisting them with the work. While in England, on the day she and her daughter were granted an audience with King George V, it was announced that her husband had been appointed the governor of Western Australia. Upon moving to Western Australia, she became the president of their state branch of the Red Cross, taking over from the inaugural president Lady Clara Barron.

Ellison-Macartney returned to live in England with her family in January of 1920.

== Death ==
Ellison-Macartney died on the 27 November 1938 in Putney Vale in England.
