= Sir Joseph McConnell, 2nd Baronet =

Sir Joseph McConnell, 2nd Baronet (17 September 1877 – 27 August 1942), was an Ulster Unionist politician. He was Member of Parliament (MP) for Antrim from 1929 to 1942.

== Family ==
McConnell was the second child (and eldest son) of Sir Robert John McConnell (1853–1927) and his first wife, Mary Elizabeth Smiley (died 1896). He married Lisa McGowan, daughter of Jackson McGowan, on 25 April 1900, and they had three children. On the death of his father in April 1927, he succeeded to his father's baronetcy as the 2nd Baronet McConnell, of the Moat, Strandtown, Belfast.

== Political career ==
McConnell was elected to the House of Commons of the United Kingdom as one of the two MPs for the Antrim constituency at the 1929 general election, after the unionist MP Charles Craig retired. He was re-elected unopposed in 1931 and 1935, and died in office in 1942, aged 64.

He held the office of deputy lieutenant of Belfast.

Parliament of the United Kingdom
Preceded by Charles Craig; Hugh O'Neill	Member of Parliament for Antrim; 1929 – 1942; With: Hugh O'Neill	Succeeded by John Dermot Campbell; Hugh O'Neill
Baronetage of the United Kingdom
Preceded by Robert McConnell	Baronet (of The Moat); 1927–1942	Succeeded by Robert McConnell
