= 1979 Ulster Unionist Party leadership election =

- 7 September 1979
Candidate	James Molyneaux	Robert Bradford	Austin Ardill
Leader before election
Harry West
Elected Leader
James Molyneaux

The 1979 Ulster Unionist Party leadership election saw James Molyneaux succeed Harry West as leader on 7 September. At a specially convened meeting of the Ulster Unionist Council at the Ulster Hall, Belfast, in early September, Molyneaux (MP for South Antrim) beat Reverend Robert Bradford (MP for Belfast South) by a three to one majority (with Austin Ardill coming a distant third). Molyneaux had previously been parliamentary leader of the United Ulster Unionist Council since 22 October 1974 (West had lost his seat in that month's general election).
