= Alexander Hunter (politician) =

Northern Irish politician

Alexander Hunter was a unionist politician in Northern Ireland.

Hunter studied at the Belfast Royal Academy and Stranmillis Training College, then at Trinity College, Dublin, and Queen's University Belfast, before becoming a teacher. He became active in the Ulster Unionist Party and was elected for Carrick, unopposed, in a by-election in 1950. He served until 1965, when he retired. He was also active in the Orange Order, and was one of the leading voices of concern over constructing the new town of Craigavon.
