= List of schools in Argentina =

This is a list of schools in the South American country of Argentina. It records the country's notable state and private schools. Tertiary schools are presented separately on the list of universities in Argentina.

School	City	Founded	Motto	Type	Education	Website
Asociación Escuelas Lincoln	La Lucila	1936	Fiat lux	Private		
Balmoral College	Banfield	1959	Labor omnia vincit	Private		
Barker College	Lomas de Zamora	1897	Manners maketh man	Private		
Belgrano Day School	Buenos Aires	1912	Fac recte	Private		
Bernasconi Institute	Buenos Aires	1929	None	Public		
Buenos Aires English High School	Buenos Aires	1884	Servabo fidem	Private		
Buenos Aires International Christian Academy	Buenos Aires	1998	Honor, excellence, service	Private		
Colegio Boston	Banfield	2005	Educar para la comprensión	Private		
Colegio Cardenal Newman	Boulogne Sur Mer	1948	Certa bonum certamen	Private		
Colegio Carmen Arriola de Marín	Béccar	1912	Educar es servir a Dios y a la Patria	Private		
Colegio de Todos Los Santos	Villa Adelina	1981	Verde es el árbol de la vida	Private		
Colegio del Salvador	Buenos Aires	1868	Ad maiorem Dei gloriam	Private		
Colegio Diocesano Monseñor Miguel Ángel Alemán	Ushuaia	1993	Justicia y paz	Private		
Colegio French	Banfield	1992	Sinceritas et eloquentia	Private		
Colegio Inglés Horacio Watson	Buenos Aires	1911	Como siembres, cosecharás	Private		
Colegio Las Victorias	Gualeguaychú	1999	None	Private		
Colegio Lincoln	Buenos Aires	1950	Labore et honore	Private		
Colegio Mallinckrodt	Buenos Aires	1905	None	Private		
Colegio Mallinckrodt	Martínez	1934	None	Private		
Colegio Marista Champagnat	Buenos Aires	1914	None	Private		
Colegio Nacional de Buenos Aires	Buenos Aires	1863	None	Public		
Colegio Nacional de Monserrat	Córdoba	1687	En virtud y Letras	Public		
Colegio Nacional de San Isidro	San Isidro	1916	None	Public		None
Colegio Nacional de Ushuaia	Ushuaia	1994	None	Public		
Colegio Pestalozzi	Buenos Aires	1934	None	Private		
Colegio Salesiano Tulio Garcia Fernández	San Miguel de Tucumán	1925	None	Private		None
Colegio San Agustín	Buenos Aires	1907	None	Private		
Colegio Santa Brígida	Buenos Aires	1899	None	Private		
Colegio Santa Catalina	San Miguel de Tucumán	1889	None	Private		
Colegio Santo Domingo	Ramos Mejía	1915	None	Private		
Colegio Tarbut	Olivos	1961	None	Private		
Colegio Ward	Villa Sarmiento	1913	Pax orbis	Private		
Dr. Manuel Pizarro Technical School	Santa Fe	1932	None	Public		
EET Nº7 Taller Regional Quilmes (IMPA)	Quilmes	1957	Identidad, maestría, progreso, acción	Public		
Escuela Argentina Modelo	Buenos Aires	1918	None	Private		
Escuela Argentina Modelo	Ingeniero Pablo Nogués	2005	None	Private		
Escuela Cangallo	Buenos Aires	1898	None	Private		
Escuela Secundaria Técnica Química Industrial y Minera	Malargüe	Unknown	None	Public		None
Escuela Superior de Comercio Carlos Pellegrini	Buenos Aires	1890	None	Public		
Escuela Técnica ORT Almagro	Buenos Aires	Unknown	None	Private		
Escuela Técnica ORT Belgrano	Buenos Aires	Unknown	None	Private		
Florida Day School	Florida	1925	Each for all	Private		
Hölters Schule	Villa Ballester	1931	None	Private		
Instituto Euskal-Echea	Llavallol, Buenos Aires	1904	Gernikako Arbola (himno)	Private		
Instituto La Salle Florida	Florida	1934	None	Private		
Instituto Politécnico Superior	Rosario	1906	None	Public		
IPEM 42 Marcela Beatriz Moyano Coudert	Córdoba	1989	None	Public		
Lycée Français Jean-Mermoz	Buenos Aires	1967	None	Private		
Michael Ham Memorial College	Nordelta	2006	Quis ut Deus?	Private		
Michael Ham Memorial College	Vicente López, Buenos Aires	1926	Quis ut Deus?	Private		
Northlands School	Olivos	1920	Friendship and service	Private		
Otto Krause Technical School	Buenos Aires	1897	None	Public		
Quilmes High School	Quilmes	1907	Sine labore nihil	Private		
Saint Gregory's School	Buenos Aires	1992	The will of teaching, the wish of learning	Private		
Saint Mary of the Hills School	Pilar	2001	Adiunge sapientiam beneficio	Private		
Saint Mary of the Hills School	San Fernando	1979	Adiunge sapientiam beneficio	Private		
Saint Paul's School	La Cumbre	1954	To strive, to seek, to find	Private		
St. Andrew's Scots School	Olivos	1838	Sic itur ad astra	Private		
St. Brendan's College	Buenos Aires	1966	Domus et schola patriam faciunt	Private		
St. Catherine's Moorlands	Buenos Aires	1956	Veritas et fidelitas	Private		
St. Catherine's Moorlands	Tortuguitas	1982	Veritas et fidelitas	Private		
St. George's College, North	Los Polvorines	1989	Vestigia nulla retrorsum	Private		
St. George's College, Quilmes	Quilmes	1898	Vestigia nulla retrorsum	Private		
St. Hilda's College	Hurlingham	1912	Laborare est orare	Private		
St. John's School	Béccar	1992	Vincit veritas	Private		
St. John's School	Martínez	1950	Vincit veritas	Private		
St. John's School	Pilar	1996	Vincit veritas	Private		
St. Margaret's School	Buenos Aires	1924	Uniti vireamus	Private		
St. Mark's College	Monte Grande	1958	Dominus regit me	Private		
Villa Devoto School	Buenos Aires	1908	Esse quam videri	Private		
Washington School	Buenos Aires	1950	El mejor niño, para el mejor hombre, para un mundo mejor	Private		

== See also ==
- Education in Argentina
- Lists of schools
