= Belfast East =

Belfast East may refer to:

- The eastern part of Belfast.
- Belfast East (UK Parliament constituency)
- Belfast East (Assembly constituency)
- Belfast East (Northern Ireland Parliament constituency)
- East Belfast F.C.
- East Belfast GAA
- East Belfast Observer
