= Belfast Victoria =

Belfast Victoria can refer to:

- Belfast Victoria (Northern Ireland Parliament constituency)
- Belfast Victoria (UK Parliament constituency)
- Belfast was the original name of Port Fairy in Victoria, Australia
