= IMPA =

IMPA may refer to:

- Impa, a recurring character in The Legend of Zelda series
- Impa Kasanganay (born 1994), American mixed martial artist
- Industrias Metalúrgicas y Plasticas Argentinas S.A., an Argentine aircraft manufacturer which made the IMPA Tu-Sa, a civil aviation trainer aircraft
- International Marine Purchasing Association, a marine supply-chain organization; see IMPA coding
- Interplanetary Monitoring Platform-A (IMP-A or IMP 1), a research satellite launched in 1963 as part of the Explorer program
- International Motor Press Association, a trade association representing automotive journalists and public relations professionals in the United States
- Instituto Nacional de Matemática Pura e Aplicada, Brazil's National Institute for Pure and Applied Mathematics
- EET Nº7 Taller Regional Quilmes (IMPA), a high school in Quilmes, Buenos Aires
- isopropyl methylphosphonic acid, a metabolite of sarin
- International Mission Photography Archive (IMPA), a repository in the USC Digital Archive offering historical photographs from the archives of international missionary organizations.
- IMPA1 (Inositol(myo)-1(or 4)-monophosphatase 1), a human gene
- Impa shilup, or "Nalusa chito", the soul eater, one of the Choctaw mythology Shadow-like beings
