= Todos Santos =

Todos Santos, Todos os Santos or Todos los Santos, or (Portuguese or Spanish, 'All Saints') may refer to:

== Places ==
=== Bolivia ===
- Todos Santos, Beni, Bolivia
- Todos Santos Lake, Bolivia

=== Brazil ===
- Todos os Santos, Rio de Janeiro, Brazil
- Todos os Santos River, Brazil
- Baía de Todos os Santos, Brazil

=== Mexico ===
- Todos Santos, Baja California Sur, Mexico
  - Todos Santos Airstrip
- Bahía de Todos Santos, Mexico
- Isla Todos Santos, Baja California, Mexico

=== Elsewhere ===
- Todos Santos Cuchumatán, Guatemala
- Todos Santos, original name of Concord, California, U.S.
- Tosantos, formerly Todos Santos, Spain
- Todos los Santos Lake, Los Lagos Region, Chile

== Other uses ==
- Colegio de Todos Los Santos, a private school in Argentina
- Todos Santos Chocolates, a Santa Fe, New Mexico chocolatier
- Todos Santos, a fictional arcology in the novel Oath of Fealty
- Todos Santos, a dialect of Mam language, Guatemala
- "Todos Santos", an episode of Hemlock Grove

== See also ==
- All Saints (disambiguation)
- Hospital Real de Todos os Santos, a historic hospital in Lisbon, Portugal
- Bahia de Todos-os-santos (book), by Jorge Amado, 1945
