= Colegio Nacional =

Colegio Nacional (Spanish: National School) is the short name of several institutions:

== Colleges ==
- Colegio Nacional Enrique Nvó Okenve, a college in Equatorial Guinea
- El Colegio Nacional (Mexico)

== High schools ==
- Colegio Nacional de Buenos Aires, Argentina
- Colegio Nacional de la Capital, Paraguay
- Colegio Nacional de Monserrat, Argentina
- Colegio Nacional de San Isidro, Argentina
- Colegio Nacional de Ushuaia, Argentina

== Other ==
- Colegio Nacional Iquitos, a Peruvian football team

== See also ==
- National school (disambiguation)
