= Ushuaia (disambiguation) =

Ushuaia is a city in Tierra Del Fuego, Argentina, which is considered the southernmost city in the world.

Ushuaia may also refer to:

- Ushuaia Department, an administrative division
- Ushuaia International Airport
- Colegio Nacional de Ushuaia, National School of Ushuaia
- Ushuaïa Ibiza Beach Hotel, a hotel on Playa D'en Bossa in Ibiza known for its electronic music parties
- Title of a French TV series and Ushuaïa Foundation, which was renamed Fondation Nicolas Hulot pour la Nature et l'Homme
- MV Ushuaia, a Panamanian-flagged cruise ship
- Ushuaia (album), 2016 album by Belgian band K3
