= Thompson Donald =

Irish politician (1876–1957)

- Donald in 1921

Member of Parliament for Belfast East
- In office 1921–1925

Member of Parliament for Belfast Victoria
- In office 1918–1922

Personal details
- Born: 12 May 1876 Ballydown, County Antrim, Ireland
- Died: 1957 (aged 80–81) Belfast, Northern Ireland
- Party: Unionist

Thompson Donald (12 May 1876 – 1957) was a Northern Irish Unionist politician.

Donald was elected to the House of Commons of the United Kingdom in the 1918 general election for the Belfast Victoria constituency and served as MP until the constituency's abolition in 1922. Donald was elected as one of the so-called 'Labour Unionists' of the Ulster Unionist Labour Association. He was secretary of this group although as an MP for both Belfast Victoria and Belfast East in the Parliament of Northern Ireland (1921–1925) he was effectively an Ulster Unionist Party representative.

== Early life ==
Donald was born at Ballydown in Islandmagee, County Antrim on 12 May 1876 and was the son of shoemaker Edward Donald and Mary Aiken. He left Islandmagee and became a shipwright in Belfast, employed by ship builders Messrs Workman & Clark. Donald became involved in trade unionism and was district secretary of the shipwrights union for several years until he was promoted to chief assistant foreman in 1912, at which point he retired from trade union activities.

== Political career ==
Politically, Donald was a Unionist and was opposed to Home Rule. As part of the Ulster Covenant campaign against Home Rule the Northern Whig for Saturday, 25 April 1914 carried an "Appeal to British Trade Unionists to help resist Home Rule" signed by, amongst others, "Thompson Donald, Trade Union Congress delegate 1909 and 1911 – Shipwrights and Ship Constructors Society". Further appeals to trade unionists were issued in subsequent editions of the paper. He played a leading role in the formation of the Trades Union Watch Committee, which became the Unionist Watch Committee and then finally in July 1918 was renamed as the Ulster Unionist Labour Association (UULA). Donald was appointed an Honorary Secretary of this new group, which was organised by Edward Carson.

=== Westminster election of 1918 ===
A month after World War I ended, trade union candidates stood in three Belfast constituencies under the UULA banner during the Westminster election in December 1918. Donald was successful in his bid for Belfast Victoria, as he was remembered as one of the organisers of the 1914 meeting against Home Rule, was a member of the Orange Order and was a Mason. The Northern Whig reported that he "was in favour of prohibition" and called for "better school" and housing for labourers. He was supported by Edward Carson. Donald won the seat with 9.309 to the Labour candidate's 3.469. The other UULA candidates, William Whitla and John Carson, also won their seats. Donald, Whitla and Carson, all backbenchers, were unable to live in London on their annual salaries of £400 and were financially assisted by the Ulster Unionist Party (UUP).

The Government of Ireland Act 1920 split the Ireland into Northern Ireland and the Republic of Ireland, allowing for one Home Rule parliament in each, with Dublin and Belfast as the centres. Both would have limited power and would continue to be represented at Westminster. That July, Donald dismissed the sackings of Catholic labourers as a conflict "of Unionists and Sinn Féiners" rather than a religious issue after MP Joseph Devlin mentioned his concerns in the House of Commons. In September 1920 Donald commented on the reprisal killing of three Sinn Féin members, warning that if any more police or soldiers were killed that there would be more than three Sinn Féiners shot.

=== Northern Ireland election of 1921 ===
The four Unionist candidates who stood for seats in Belfast East on the new 52-person Parliament of Northern Ireland were elected, with Donald coming third. In total, all 40 Unionist candidates were returned and the remaining 12 seats went to either Nationalist or Sinn Féin candidates, who refused to take their seats. In March 1922, concerns were raised about boundaries between the two territories and whether Westminster would give parts of counties Tyrone, Fermanagh and Londonderry to the Provisional Government in Dublin (see Partition of Ireland). Donald and Devlin were told by the Speaker that they were out of line and it was ultimately decided that boundary lines would be decided by the Parliament of Northern Ireland. Parliamentary records show that Donald was involved in many other debates on this topic in the convening months.

In a debate on 26 June 1922 on the second reading of a Bill to abolish proportional representation (PR) as a voting system in future Northern Ireland elections, Donald said he disliked it because it was cumbersome, but allowed that it provided minority representation, which he felt was necessary. Donald stood in the Westminster elections again in 1922 but lost; he was also unsuccessful during the Parliament of Northern Ireland election in 1925. This marked the end of his political career.

== Later years ==
Shortly after 1925 Thompson Donald became caretaker of the Petty Sessions courts in Town Hall Street off Victoria Street in Belfast. He subsequently lived in London for some years. He returned to Belfast where he died of natural causes in 1957. His obituary was published in the Belfast Telegraph.

Parliament of the United Kingdom
| New constituency | Member of Parliament for Belfast Victoria; 1918–1922 | Parliament abolished |
Parliament of Northern Ireland
| New parliament | Member of Parliament for Belfast East; 1921–1925; With: Herbert Dixon; Dawson Bates; James Augustine Duff | Succeeded by Herbert Dixon; Dawson Bates; Jack Beattie; James Woods Gyle |
