= Helmut Ditsch =

Argentine painter

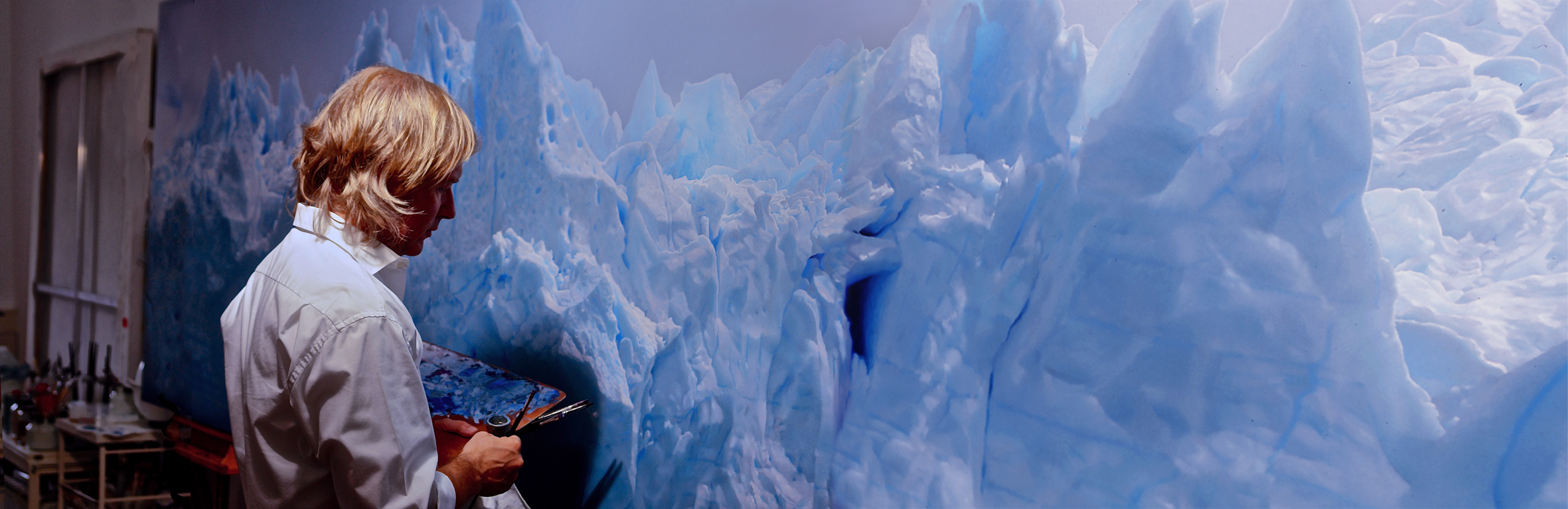
Helmut Ditsch.

Helmut Ditsch (born July 6, 1962) is an Argentine painter. Ditsch's work focuses on extreme natural phenomena such as mountains, desert, ice, and water.

== Life ==
He was born in Villa Ballester, in the province of Buenos Aires, to grandparents from Austria and Germany, including northern Italian origins, who had immigrated to Argentina in 1920. The early death of the artist's mother, and with it the theme of life and death, impacted his work. At the age of eight he was introduced to the two vast Argentine landscapes, the Pampas grasslands and the Andes mountain range, which have influenced his life and work. After graduating from Hölters Schule he started to pursue a career as a painter.

In 1982 Ditsch served in the Argentine Navy during the Falklands War. In 1983 he began working as a freelance artist. The same year he founded the music band 357 MAGNUM and shot his first film in Mendoza.

In 1988 Helmut Ditsch moved to Vienna, Austria, to begin his education at the Academy of Fine Arts Vienna. He concluded his studies in painting in 1993 and graduated with honors. In the following year he opened his studio near Vienna. Around this time Helmut Ditsch became acquainted with and befriended Italian mountaineer Reinhold Messner in Meran, with whom he has since collaborated on numerous occasions.

In order to study the glacial ice, Helmut Ditsch undertook a journey in 1995 to Patagonia. In 1998 he spent many weeks isolated in the Austrian Alps to study for his painting Das Gebirge ("The Mountains"). In 2000, he moved his studio to Ireland, where he has lived and worked since. In 2006, Helmut Ditsch presented his book The Triumph of Nature as part of a solo exhibition at the Feria International del Libro Show in Argentina.

In 2008, he founded the HELMUT DITSCH FAN FABRICA DE ARTE NACIONAL, a transparent laboratory for art, music, philosophy and high technology design.

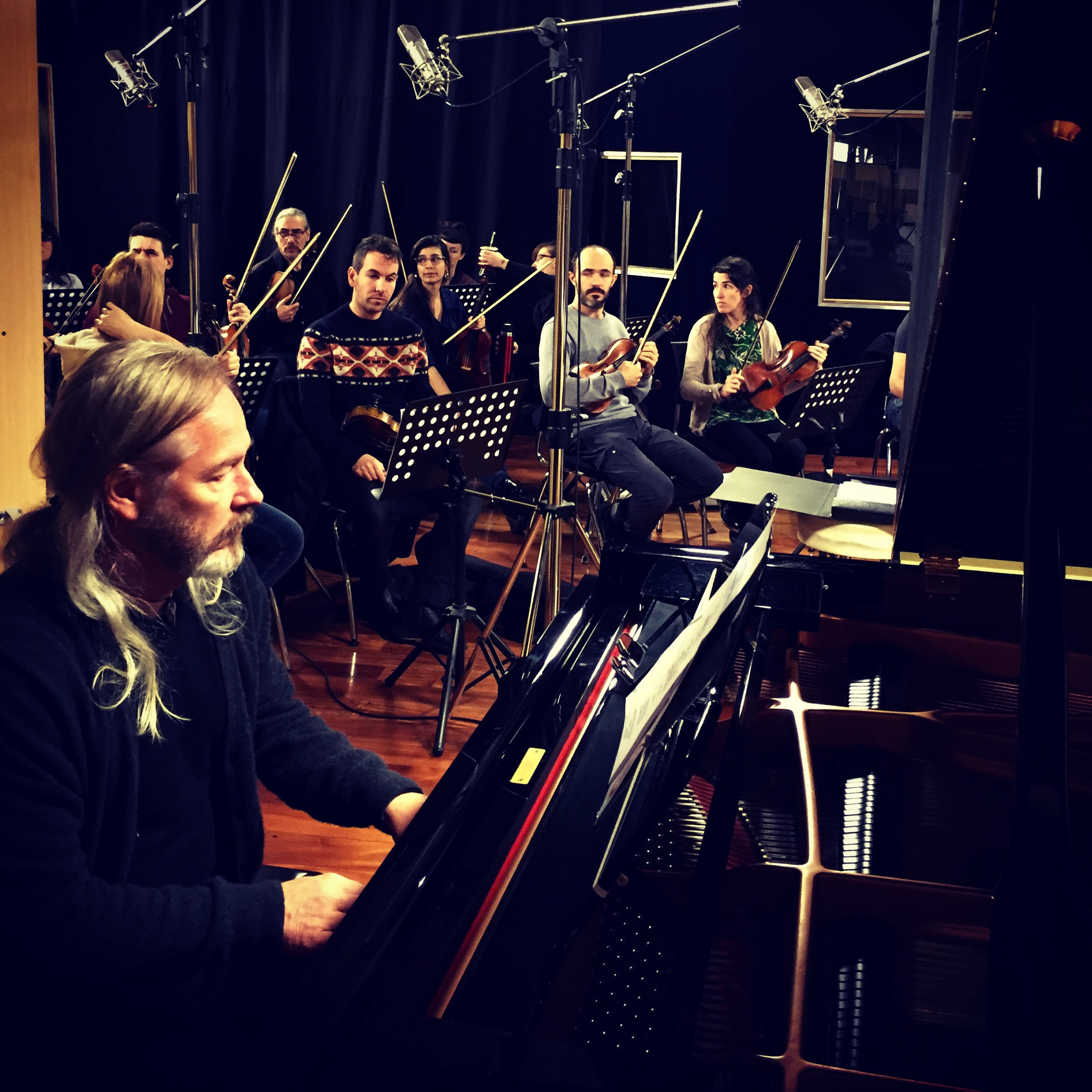
Helmut Ditsch recording his first album "Del Final de los Tiempos" in Buenos Aires (June 2016)

In 2010, the sale of the painting Das Meer II for US$865.000 made Ditsch the most expensive artist in Argentina. The same year he began his exhibition tour "GIRA NACIONAL Y POPULAR" (so far in: Santa Fe, Paraná, Rosario, Vienna, Mar del Plata, Mendoza). The exhibitions have an inclusive character and take place at public spaces with free entry.

In 2012 Helmut Ditsch moves to Liechtenstein and opens his new atelier in Vaduz.

In 2016 the painting Cosmigonon was sold for the record price of US$1.500.000.

In June 2016 Helmut Ditsch begins to use his creative talent in music and recorded his first album "Del Final de los Tiempos". The work of the artist includes music, lyrics, arrangement and voice. He also conducts an orchestra while playing the piano. Helmut Ditsch argues that his symphonic poems are the melody which you can also find on canvas. “I conceive my paintings through music. In fact the colours have a tonal frequency. Therefore every time when I paint, I create a music score.’’

In 2017/2018 Helmut Ditsch creates his biggest painting ever. On a 2 x 12 metres big canvas he paints the famous Argentinian glacier Perito Moreno. It is sold to the Austrian HPH Privatstiftung (Hans Peter Haselsteiner private foundation) for the record price of € 1.615.900. With this acquisition the Austrian industrialist Haselsteiner gets the biggest collector of Helmut Ditsch’s art.

In 2018 Helmut starts in cooperation with Eutopiafilm his first own film project. It is an autobiographical, fictional and completely independent art movie, told in the first person by the artist himself. This work is full of poetic images and establishes a new film genre in which Helmut Ditsch acts as screenwriter, actor, director, composer, costume designer and producer. The ambitious 7-year film project is in the final stage.

In 2025 Ditsch opens a second atelier in Vienna.

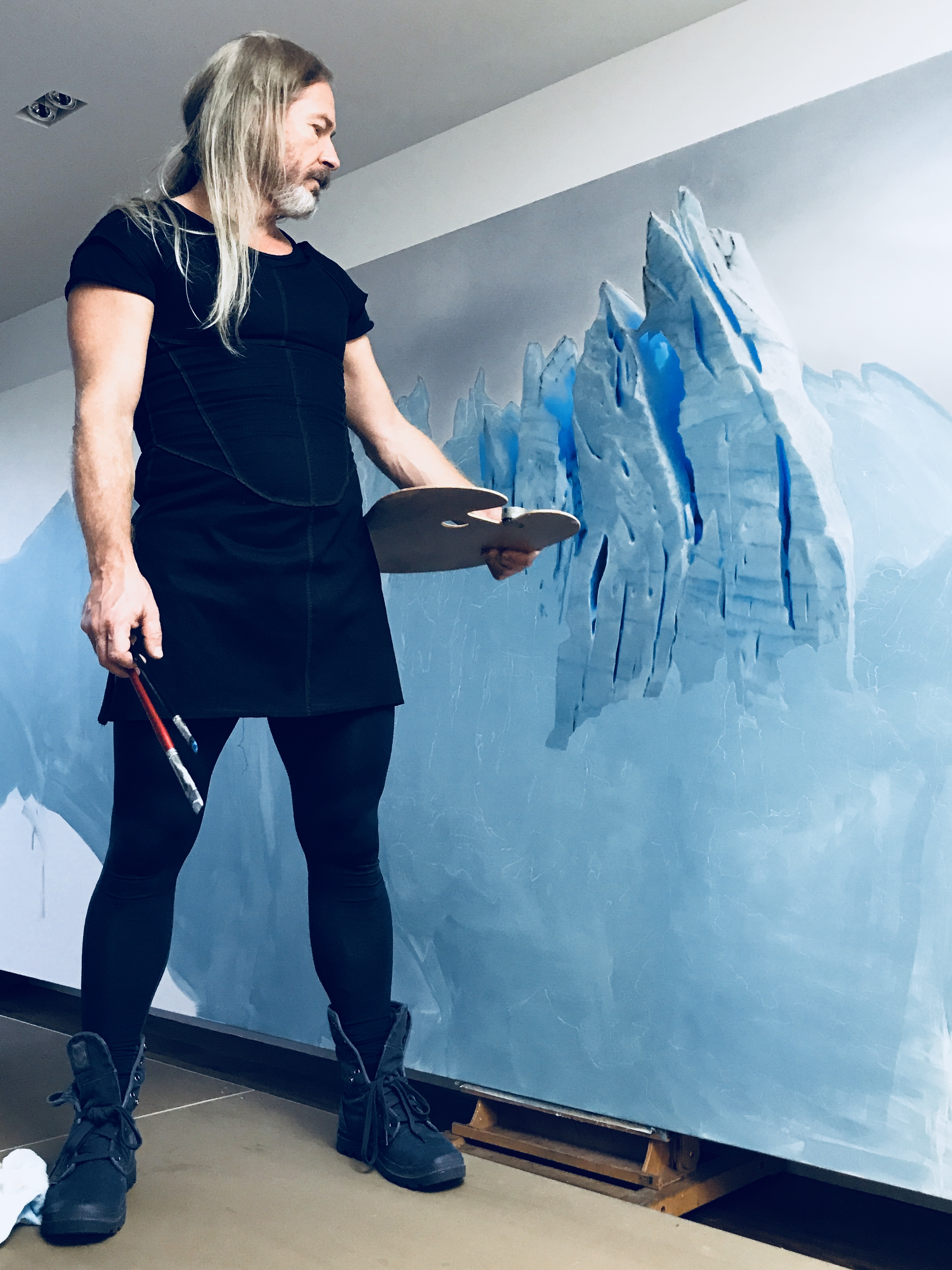
Helmut Ditsch painting (2018)

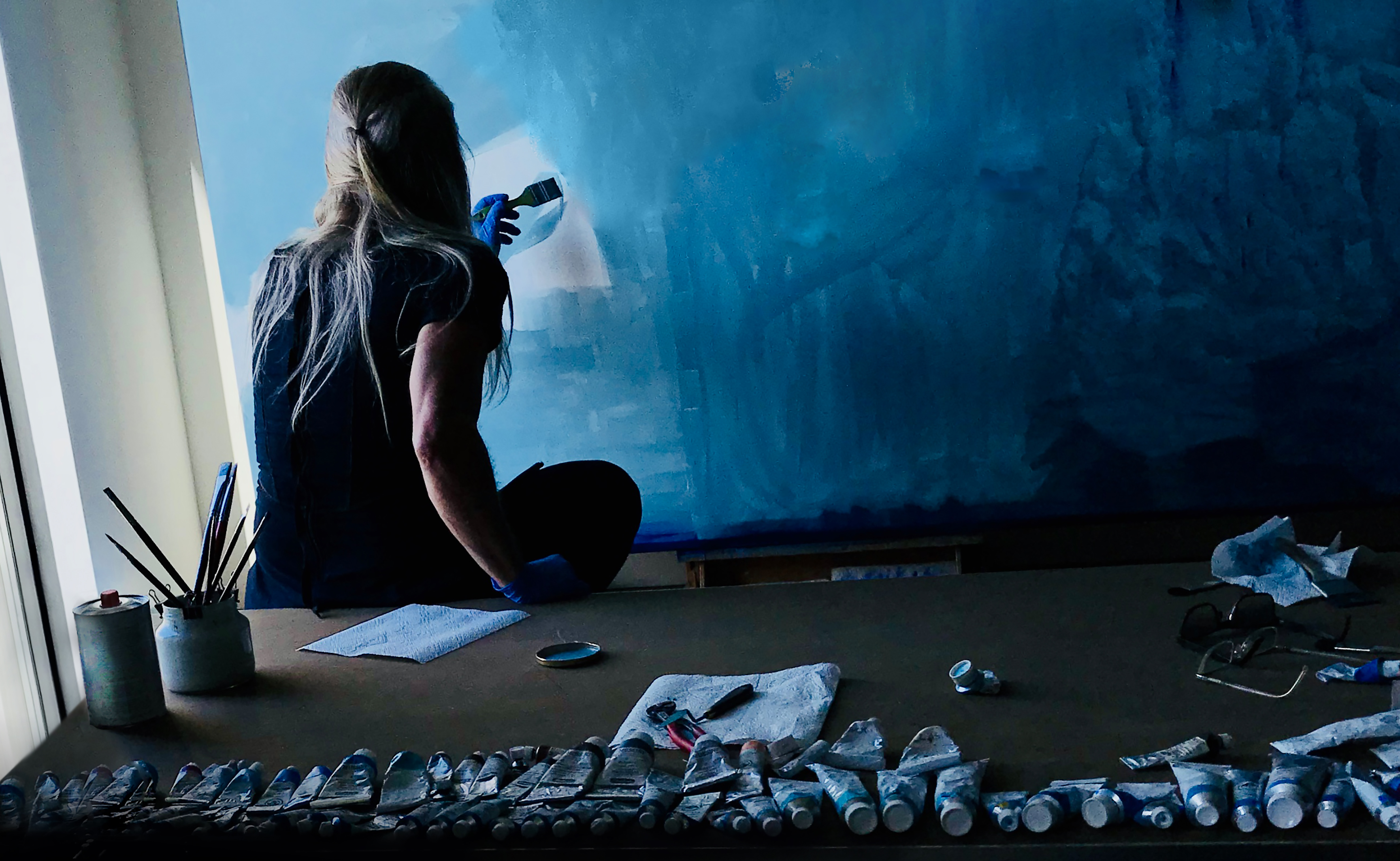
Helmut Ditsch painting (2018)

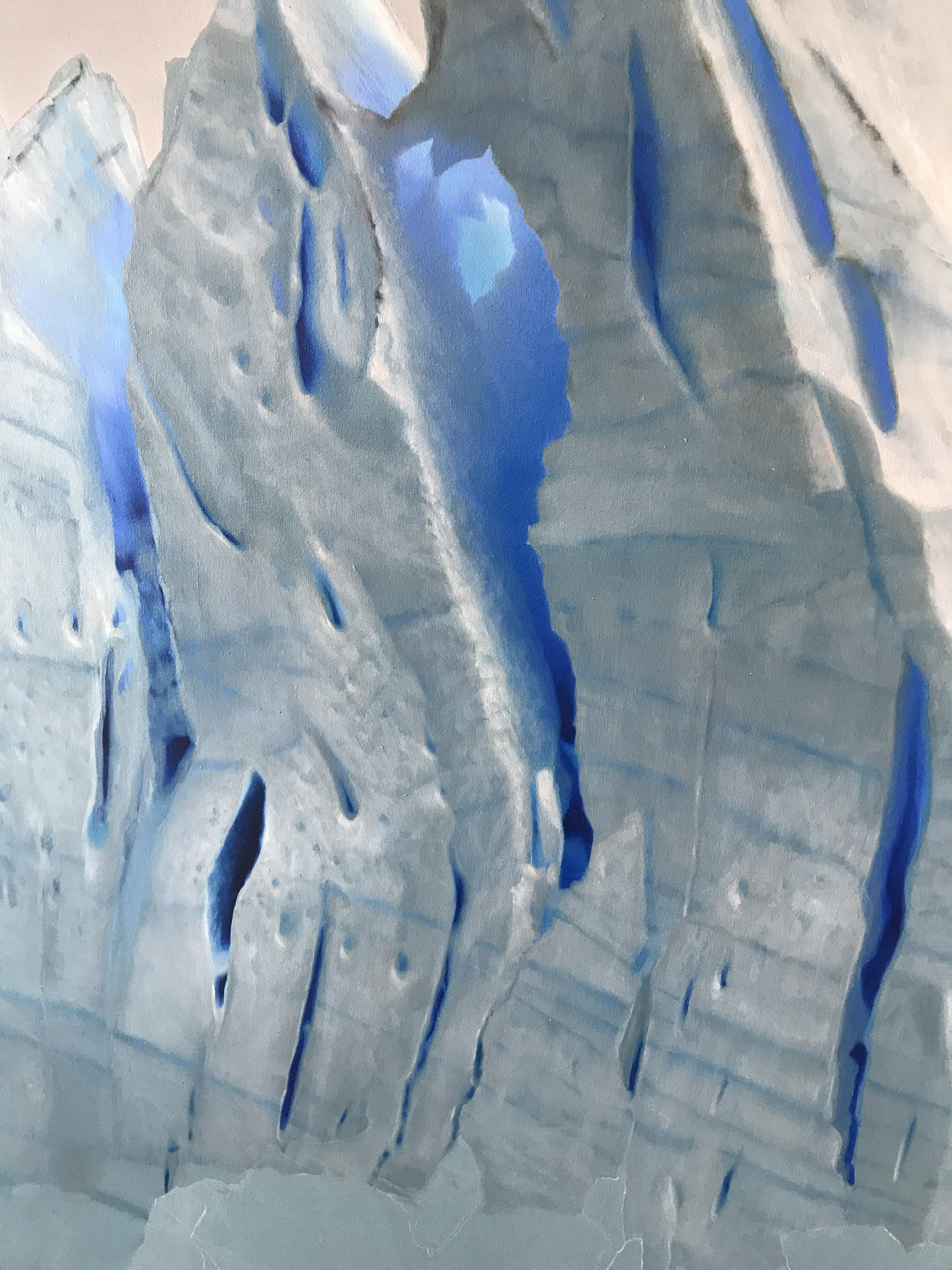
Painting of Helmut Ditsch (detail)

== Selected works ==
- Cycle IV, 1991
- Über dem Güßfeldt-Gletscher, 1993
- Cerro Ameghino, 1994
- Aconcagua, 1994
- Klagenfurt Becken, 1996
- Death Valley IV, 1996
- Mountain Range, 1998–1999
- Death Valley ?, 1995–2000
- The Answer, 1997–2000
- Ötscher, 1998–2000
- Descalza, 1999–2000
- Point Of No Return, 2001
- Das Eis und die vergängliche Ewigkeit, 2001–2002
- The ten commandments II, 2002
- Los Hielos, 2002
- Cosmigonon, 2002
- Traunsee, 2003
- Das Meer I, 2004
- Cafayate, 2004
- Perito Moreno, 2004
- Also Sprach Zarathustra, 2004
- Das Meer II, 2005
- Point Of No Return II, 2005
- K2, 2006

== Awards ==
- 1990 Master Class Award of Academy of Fine Arts Vienna, Austria
- 1993 Appreciation Prize of the Federal Ministry of Science and Research Austria
- 1997 Special prize of the Bau Holding Kunstforum
- 2010 Honorary Citizen of the General San Martín Partido, Province of Buenos Aires, Argentina
- 2012 Cultural Award "Dr. Arturo Jauretche"
- 2012 Honorary master's degree from the Universidad Nacional de General San Martín (UNSAM)

== Sources ==
- Carl Aigner: The Triumph of Nature. The Paintings of Helmut Ditsch. Prestel Munich, Berlin, London, New York, 2005, ISBN 3-7913-3269-4
- Carl Aigner: Helmut Ditsch: The Triumph of Painting. Prestel Munich, Berlin, London, New York, 2009, ISBN 978-3-7913-4209-2
