= Ballydown =

Ballydown may refer to:

- Ballydown, County Antrim, a townland in County Antrim, Northern Ireland
- Ballydown, County Down, a townland in County Down, Northern Ireland
