= James Woods Gyle =

Northern Irish politician (??–1934)

James Woods Gyle (died 2 December 1934) was an Independent Unionist politician in Northern Ireland, member of the Parliament of Northern Ireland.

Born in Belfast, the son of mariner John Gyle and Fanny Woods. Gyle was married in December 1894 to Helen Dempster, with whom he had two children.

He was suspended from the Orange Order in 1934 for seven years, because he visited Joseph Devlin MP for Belfast Central on his deathbed.

He was elected in the 1925 Northern Ireland general election for Belfast East until 1929. He unsuccessfully contested the 1929 Northern Ireland general election for Belfast Dock.

He was a member of the Senate of Northern Ireland from 1933 until his death on 2 December 1934.

Parliament of Northern Ireland
Preceded by Dawson Bates; Herbert Dixon; Thompson Donald; James Augustine Duff	Member of Parliament for Belfast East; 1925–1929; With: Dawson Bates; Herbert Dixon; Jack Beattie	Constituency abolished
