= Minister for Community Relations =

The Minister for Community Relations was a member of the Cabinet in the Parliament of Northern Ireland which governed Northern Ireland from 1922 to 1972. The post was created in 1969 and lasted until 1972. It was vacant for a month in 1971, after David Bleakley resigned. Bleakley was not a member of the Parliament of Northern Ireland, and was therefore limited to holding a ministerial post for a maximum period of six months.

#	Name	Took office	Prime Minister	Party
1.	Robert Simpson	29 October 1969	Chichester-Clark, Faulkner	UUP
2.	David Bleakley	25 March 1971	Faulkner	NI Labour
	Post vacant	25 September 1971	Faulkner	
3.	Basil McIvor	26 October 1971	Faulkner	UUP
