= Jack Beattie =

John Beattie

Leader of the Northern Ireland Labour Party in Stormont
- In office 1942–1943
- Preceded by: Paddy Agnew
- Succeeded by: Paddy Agnew
- In office 1929–1933
- Preceded by: Sam Kyle
- Succeeded by: Harry Midgley

Member of Parliament for Belfast West
- In office 25 October 1951 – 26 May 1955
- Preceded by: Thomas Teevan
- Succeeded by: Patricia McLaughlin
- In office 9 February 1943 – 23 February 1950
- Preceded by: Alexander Browne
- Succeeded by: J. G. MacManaway

Member of the Parliament of Northern Ireland
- In office 22 May 1929 – 19 February 1949
- Preceded by: Constituency established
- Succeeded by: Samuel Rodgers
- Constituency: Belfast Pottinger
- In office 3 April 1925 – 22 May 1929
- Preceded by: Thompson Donald
- Succeeded by: Constituency abolished
- Constituency: Belfast East

Personal details
- Born: 14 April 1886 Ballymacarrett, Belfast
- Died: 9 March 1960 (aged 73) Belfast, Northern Ireland
- Party: Irish Labour (1949-1960)
- Other political affiliations: NILP (1925-1943); ILP (1943-1945); Federation of Labour (1945-1949)

John Beattie (14 April 1886 – 9 March 1960) was a Northern Ireland Labour Party (NILP) politician from Northern Ireland. He was a teacher by profession. In 1925, he became a Member of the Northern Ireland House of Commons for Belfast East. He represented Belfast Pottinger from 1929. At one point he served as leader of the NILP.

== Early life ==
Beattie was born into a Presbyterian family in Ballymacarrett, Belfast and left school at 13. After working in the Belfast Ropeworks he joined the British Army for three years and then became an apprentice blacksmith in the Harland & wolf shipyards and joined the Independent Labour Party in Belfast and later became assistant secretary of the Associated Blacksmiths' Society and then from 1921 to 1925 the full time organiser.

== Early career ==
Belfast did not prosper in the 1920s. During the period, 1923 to 1930, unemployment in Northern Ireland averaged 19 per cent of the insured workforce. Many of the long-term unemployed became ineligible to receive unemployment assistance. To make matters worse, the Belfast Poor Law Union, the last resort of the destitute applied its rules on who qualified to receive assistance very harshly. On one occasion in June 1926 unemployed men protested outside a meeting of the Guardians of the Belfast Poor Law Union. Jack Beattie and William McMullen, a fellow NILP MP were among their number. The two MPs obstructed the meeting and were unceremoniously "seized by the police and thrown out onto the pavement." The Guardians were later congratulated for their "stand ...by a delegation of Protestant clergymen who called on the guardians 'to cut off grants to parasites'".

Historian Tim Pat Coogan remarks of the time that, despite the prevailing conditions, "the Unionist ascendency was so secure that it could blithely go ahead with measures such as cutting unemployment benefits while lavishing expenditure on the new parliament building, which was opened in 1932".

Jack Beattie did not blithely play along with the establishment. One occasion perhaps highlights this better than any: in September 1932, Lord Craigavon, the Prime Minister of Northern Ireland, spoke in the Parliament of Northern Ireland on a motion thanking the Belfast Corporation for the use of the City Hall for meetings of the Northern Ireland Parliament. Beattie, incensed, seized the mace and shouted that his motion to bring "to your notice the serious position of the unemployment in Northern Ireland" had been rejected. An unusual scene of uproar ensued as Tommy Henderson joined Beattie in his protests. Bardon reports that ignoring the Speaker's pleas for order, Beattie continued shouting "I am going to put this out of action....The House indulged in hypocrisy while there are starving thousands outside." Beattie then wrested the mace from the sergeant-at-arms, threw it upon the floor, and walked out.

Unlike the majority of the NILP, Beattie supported Irish unity. In 1934 he was expelled from the NILP after refusing to call a by-election in Belfast Central, where the party were the main opponents of the Nationalist Party. In the same year, he became an organiser for the Northern Ireland Teachers' Organisation.

Beattie was a director and vice-president of Glentoran Football Club.

== Later career ==
In 1942, Beattie was readmitted to the NILP. He went on to win the 1943 Belfast West by-election but resigned from the NILP shortly after.

In 1945, he held his seat and formed the Federation of Labour (Ireland), but took the Labour Party (UK) whip in the British House of Commons. He was the only Labour candidate returned in Northern Ireland. However, his tenure as a Labour MP was short: He joined the Labour Party in London as an individual member, using his London accommodation address but was subsequently expelled, "solely on the grounds that his place of residence was Belfast". On 30 April 1945, Beattie was punched in the Stormont Parliament by the Government Minister and former NILP MP, Harry Midgley. Midgley apologised the next day.

When the 1949 Northern Ireland general election took place, the Anti-Partition League of Ireland was at its height. The middle ground in Northern Irish politics was squeezed. Beattie, who had accepted money from a fund established by the Anti-Partition League, "wore a steel helmet while campaigning in east Belfast". When one of his election meetings was broken up by an angry mob, he sent a telegram of protest to Downing Street which read "Stoned by official Unionist mobs and denied the right of free speech in my election campaign tonight. Armed Stormont police took no action".

Beattie lost his seat, disbanded the Federation and joined the Irish Labour Party. Tim Pat Coogan remarks that with the defeat of Beattie and other opposition candidates, "for the first time the opposition at Stormont was entirely Catholic, a matter of much satisfaction to [Prime Minister] Brooke".

Although he lost Belfast West in the 1950 UK general election, Beattie retook it in 1951, losing it once more at the 1955 election. His attempt to win Belfast Central in the Stormont Parliament in 1953 also failed.

Parliament of Northern Ireland
Preceded by Dawson Bates; Herbert Dixon; Thompson Donald; James Augustine Duff	Member of Parliament for Belfast East; 1925–1929; With: Dawson Bates; Herbert Dixon; James Woods Gyle	Constituency abolished
New constituency	Member of Parliament for Belfast Pottinger; 1929–1949	Succeeded by Samuel Rodgers
Parliament of the United Kingdom
Preceded by Alexander Browne	Member of Parliament for Belfast West; 1943–1950	Succeeded by James MacManaway
Preceded by Thomas Teevan	Member of Parliament for Belfast West; 1951–1955	Succeeded by Patricia McLaughlin
Political offices
Preceded by Sam Kyle	Leader of the Northern Ireland Labour Party at Stormont; 1929–1933	Succeeded by Harry Midgley
Preceded by Paddy Agnew	Leader of the Northern Ireland Labour Party at Stormont; 1942–1943	Succeeded by Paddy Agnew
