= Herbert Dixon, 1st Baron Glentoran =

Northern Irish peer, soldier and politician (1880–1950)

The Right Honourable The Lord Glentoran OBE PC (NI) DL

Member of Parliament for Belfast East
- In office 15 November 1922 – 8 July 1939
- Preceded by: Robert Sharman-Crawford
- Succeeded by: Henry Harland

Personal details
- Born: 23 January 1880 Belfast, Ireland
- Died: 20 June 1950 (aged 61) Belfast, Northern Ireland
- Party: Ulster Unionist Party
- Spouse: Emily Bingham
- Education: RMC, Sandhurst
- Profession: Soldier, politician

Herbert Dixon, 1st Baron Glentoran, OBE, PC (NI), DL (23 January 1880 – 20 July 1950) was a Unionist politician from Ireland.

== Early life ==
Dixon was born in Belfast, the fourth son of Sir Daniel Dixon, 1st Baronet, and Annie Shaw. He was educated at Rugby School and the Royal Military College, Sandhurst, before being commissioned into the Royal Inniskilling Fusiliers as a second lieutenant on 20 January 1900. He was promoted to lieutenant on 14 May 1901, and served with the 6th (Inniskilling) Dragoons in the Second Boer War in South Africa in 1902. After the war he returned home in September 1902, and was posted at Curragh Camp. He later fought with the British Army in the First World War.

== Political career ==
In 1918 Dixon was elected Unionist Member of Parliament for the seat of Belfast Pottinger, becoming representative for Belfast East four years later. He was also sent to the Northern Ireland House of Commons in 1921 as a member for Belfast East, being appointed Parliamentary Secretary to the Ministry of Finance, and was finally elected member for the seat of Belfast Bloomfield in 1929.

Dixon was appointed OBE in 1919 and admitted to the Privy Council of Northern Ireland in 1923. In 1939 he was raised to the peerage as Baron Glentoran, of Ballyalloly in the County of Down. He served as Parliamentary Secretary to the Ministry of Finance and Government Chief Whip from 1921 to 1942 and as Minister of Agriculture in the Parliament of Northern Ireland from 1941 to 1943. In May 1950 he succeeded his elder brother Sir Thomas Dixon as third baronet.

== Marriage and children ==
On 25 November 1905 Lord Glentoran married the Hon Emily Ina Florence Bingham, daughter of John Bingham, 5th Baron Clanmorris. They had five children together:

- Hon Daphne Maude Dixon (died 6 April 1942)
- Hon Anne Lavinia Dixon (died 16 September 1971)
- Hon Angela Ierne Evelyn Dixon (born 16 February 1907, died October 2003), married Lieutenant-Commander the Hon Peter Ross RN (born 8 August 1906, killed in action 14 October 1940), elder son of Una Ross, 25th Baroness de Ros with whom she had two daughters including Georgiana Maxwell, 26th Baroness de Ros.
- Colonel Daniel Stewart Thomas Bingham Dixon, 2nd Baron Glentoran (born 19 January 1912, died 22 July 1995)
- Hon Patricia Clare Dixon (born 1919)

Lord Glentoran died in July 1950, aged 70, and was succeeded in his titles by his son Daniel. Lady Glentoran died in 1957.

== Arms ==
Coat of arms of Herbert Dixon, 1st Baron Glentoran
Crest A demi-lion rampant Azure, charged on the shoulder with a cross patonce surrounded by a civic crown Or. Escutcheon Or on a chevron Vair three billets of the first on a chief crenellé Gules a tower proper between two fleurs-de-lis Or. Supporters Two war horses Argent unglued Or caparisoned Proper the shabraque Sable broidered of the second. Motto Fide Et Constantia (By Fidelity And Constancy)

== See also ==
- List of Northern Ireland Members of the House of Lords

Parliament of the United Kingdom
New constituency	Member of Parliament for Belfast Pottinger; 1918–1922	Constituency abolished
New constituency	Member of Parliament for Belfast East; 1922–1939	Succeeded by Henry Harland
Parliament of Northern Ireland
New parliament	Member of Parliament for Belfast East; 1921–1929; With: Dawson Bates 1921–1929; Thompson Donald 1921–1925; James Augustine Duff 1921–1925; Jack Beattie 1925–1929; James Woods Gyle 1925–1929	Parliament abolished
New constituency	Member of Parliament for Belfast Bloomfield; 1929–1950	Succeeded by Daniel Dixon
Political offices
New office	Parliamentary Secretary to the Ministry of Finance; 1921–1942	Succeeded by Sir Norman Stronge
Preceded by Basil Brooke	Minister of Agriculture; 1941–1943	Succeeded by Robert Moore
Party political offices
New office	Unionist Chief Whip; 1921–1942	Succeeded by Sir Norman Stronge
Peerage of the United Kingdom
New title	Baron Glentoran; 1939–1950	Succeeded by Daniel Dixon
Baronetage of the United Kingdom
Preceded by Thomas Dixon	Baronet (of Ballymenock); 1950	Succeeded by Daniel Dixon
