= ORT University Mexico =

Coordinates: 19°25′14″N 99°09′21″W

- Universidad Ort México
- Type: Private non-profit (IAP)
- Established: 2015
- Affiliations: World ORT
- President: Dr. Moises Salinas Fleitman
- Students: 1300
- Location: Colima 56, Colonia Roma Norte; Cuauhtémoc, Mexico City 06700, Mexico City, Mexico
- Website: www.ort.edu.mx

ORT University Mexico is a non-profit Institution founded in 2015 in Mexico City. Founded by board members Mauricio Merikanskas, Dan Ostrosky and Rogerio Casas Alatriste, and president Moises Salinas Fleitman, it was created in collaboration with the Private Assistance Board of Mexico City, in response to the growing need for professionalization in the social sector in Mexico.

It is part of the global educational network of World ORT, an organization founded in Russia in 1880 and currently operating in over 60 countries, with more than 250,000 students. Its affiliated higher education institutions include Universidad ORT Uruguay, Los Angeles ORT College in the United States, and ORT Braude College of Engineering in Israel.

ORT University Mexico is the only higher education institution in Latin America whose academic programs are fully focused on strengthening the social sector, also known as the third sector, with focus areas such as education, addiction prevention, environmental issues, human rights, and disability. The university collaborates with public institutions and NGOs, and maintains formal agreements with the Mexico City Private Assistance Board, the Instituto para la Atención y Prevención de las Adicciones (IAPA), and SEMARNAT (Mexico's Ministry of the Environment).

== Recognition and Notability ==
ORT University Mexico has received independent recognition from national and international sources for its focus on social responsibility and nonprofit education. In 2017, ORT University Mexico received a major USAID grant to train human rights organizations in the US-Mexico Border, .

In December 2019, it received the **Alliances for Impact Award** from Fondo Unido México–United Way for its collaborative projects, and in May 2020, the university was recognized by *GANAR-GANAR* magazine as the best institution in Mexico to study social responsibility programs. In 2022, the university was the only Latin American institution honored with the **Investing in the Community Award** by the UK‑based Howden Group Foundation for its work advancing social responsibility, entrepreneurship and leadership. In May 2024, *El Economista* highlighted ORT University Mexico as “number one in México to study social responsibility and sustainability” when launching new sustainability‑oriented degree programs. In November 2025, *Financial Magazine* selected ORT University Mexico as a top ten ranked university for development of Social Projects in Latin America.

== Research and Academic Output ==
ORT University Mexico is listed in the 2025 AD Scientific Index, which evaluates institutions by researchers’ H‑index and citation impact, placing it among the notable research universities in Mexico.

Faculty members have contributed to peer-reviewed journals and edited volumes in education and social sciences, for example:

- Professor Fredy Aldo Macedo Huamán published a scholarly article in *Alternativas en Ciencias Sociales* (2023), as reported by the university’s communications.
- Professor Miriam Grunstein contributed a policy analysis on Mexico’s 2025 energy reform in a peer-reviewed journal, demonstrating faculty engagement in public policy discourse.
- Moisés Salinas Fleitman and Jaime Israel Salinas Fleitman co-authored *“Desarrollo de cultura de investigación en posgrados en línea y presencial en educación”* in the *RIDE Revista Iberoamericana para la Investigación y el Desarrollo Educativo* (2023), examining research culture within graduate education.

== Academic Programs ==
Universidad ORT México offers 8 academic programs at the undergraduate, graduate certificate, and master's levels:

- Bachelor's Degree in Psychology with a focus on Victim Assistance and Community Psychology
- Bachelor's Degree in Law with a focus on Human Rights
- Bachelor's Degree in Administration and Social Responsibility
- Graduate Certificate in Ethics and Society
- Master's Degree in Social Administration and Entrepreneurship
- Master's Degree in Environmental Education
- Master's Degree in Educational Innovation
