= Dawson Bates =

Northern Irish politician (1876–1949)

The Right Honourable Sir Dawson Bates Bt, OBE, JP, DL
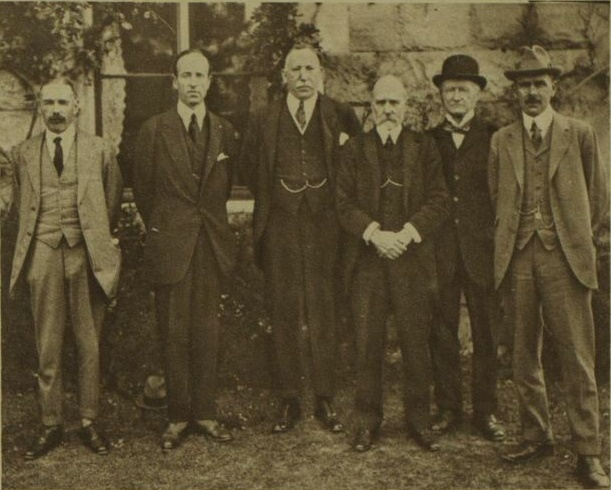
- Bates (l) in 1921

Minister of Home Affairs
- In office 7 June 1921 – 6 May 1943

Member of the Northern Ireland Parliament for Belfast East Belfast, Victoria (1929–1945)
- In office 1921–1945

Personal details
- Born: 23 November 1876 Belfast, Ireland
- Died: 20 June 1949 (aged 72) Glastonbury, United Kingdom
- Party: Ulster Unionist Party
- Spouse: Jessie Muriel Cleland
- Children: 1

Sir Richard Dawson Bates, 1st Baronet (23 November 1876 – 10 June 1949), known as Dawson Bates, was an Ulster Unionist Party (UUP) member of the House of Commons of Northern Ireland and the first Minister of Home Affairs.

He was born in Strandtown, Belfast, the son of Richard Dawson Bates, solicitor and Clerk of the Crown, and Mary Dill. His paternal grandfather, John Bates (died 1855), had been a minor figure in the Conservative Party in Belfast, before his duties were discharged on a Chancery Court ruling of maladministration.

Bates was educated at Coleraine Academical Institution. After studying at Queen's University Belfast, he became a solicitor in 1900, in 1908 founding a firm with his uncle – E and R.D. Bates. In 1906, Bates was appointed Secretary of the Ulster Unionist Council. During this time, he was instrumental in the events of Ulster Day and in the formation of the Ulster Volunteer Force, organised the Larne gun-running and supported the formation of the Ulster Unionist Labour Association to counter socialism. He toured Northern Ireland, working hard to build up the Unionist Party, while portraying all Roman Catholics, thus Nationalists as traitors. Bates heavy influence in the UUP meant his reluctance to co-operate with Roman Catholics had to be heeded if the party was to avoid splits.

Bates stood down as secretary on his election to Stormont in 1921, where he represented first Belfast East and later Belfast Victoria. In the government of James Craig he was Minister of Home Affairs and a member of the Privy Council of Northern Ireland. On 15 December 1921 Bates authorized the closure of the County Councils for counties Tyrone and Fermanagh due to their pledges of allegiance to the new Irish Parliament (Dáil Éireann). On 15 March 1922 he introduced the Civil Authorities (Special Powers) Act, which permitted search, arrest/detention without warrant, flogging and capital punishment for arms offences. Internments began upon the Commencement of the Act (7 April 1922). By May 1922 up to 700 members of the Irish Republican Army (IRA) had been arrested. In July 1922 many internees were transferred to the prison ship (hulk) HMS Argenta which has been described as a "floating gulag".

In 1936 the British National Council for Civil Liberties published a report on the Special Powers Act and the actions of Bates: "As soon as the Special Powers Act was passed and Regulation 23B in operation the minister of home affairs and the police acting under his authority proceeded to arrest many hundreds of people suspected of political opposition to the Unionist party, and to intern them, in the majority of cases for upwards of two years. No charges were ever laid against these internees, nor did the minister or the police give any reasons, in writing or otherwise, for having them arrested." In late 1939 Bates responded to attacks along the border by again using internment, which delayed the start of the IRA's Northern campaign. Under his administration, Bates was accused of gerrymandering and of intervening to ensure that prison sentences were not imposed on Protestants who attacked Catholics.

Bates was also a Deputy Lord Lieutenant of County Down.

He married Jessie Muriel Cleland, daughter of Sir Charles John Cleland. They had one son, Major Sir John Dawson Bates, 2nd Baronet.

He was appointed an Officer of the Order of the British Empire (OBE) in the 1919 New Year Honours, Knight Bachelor in 1921 and was made a baronet of Magherabuoy, near Portrush, in County Londonderry on 7 June 1937. In his retirement strained financial circumstances and security (he constantly required a police escort) led him to rent Butleigh House, near Glastonbury, Somerset. It was here he died in 1949; Bates' body was flown back to Ulster for burial at Ballywillan Church of Ireland.

Bates was a director and president of Glentoran Football Club.

== Sources and reading ==
- Ireland since 1939 (2006), Henry Patterson
- A history of the Ulster Unionist Party (2004), Graham Walker
- The Ulster Unionist Party, 1882–1973 : its development and organisation (1973), J F Harbinson

Parliament of Northern Ireland
New parliament	Member of Parliament for Belfast East; 1921–1929; With: Herbert Dixon 1921–1929; Thompson Donald 1921–1925; James Augustine Duff 1921–1925; Jack Beattie 1925–1929; James Woods Gyle 1925–1929	Parliament abolished
New constituency	Member of Parliament for Belfast Victoria; 1929–1945	Succeeded by Robert Alexander
Party political offices
Preceded by T. H. Gibson	Secretary of the Ulster Unionist Council; 1906–1921	Succeeded by Wilson Hungerford
Political offices
New office	Minister of Home Affairs; 1921–1943	Succeeded by William Lowry
Baronetage of the United Kingdom
New title Granted by King George VI	Baronet (of Magherabuoy); 1937–1949	Succeeded by John Dawson Bates
