= James Augustine Duff =

Scottish-born Northern Irish businessman and politician

James Augustine Duff (27 September 1872 – 4 March 1943) was a Scottish-born Northern Irish businessman and Ulster Unionist Party politician.

Born in Glasgow, he was educated locally before moving to Belfast. He sat on Belfast City Council, served as the city's Justice of the Peace, and was the High Sheriff of Belfast in 1923. He represented Belfast East in the Parliament of Northern Ireland from 1921 to 1925. Defeated at the 1925 election he contested the new Belfast Pottinger seat at the 1929 election but was not elected as the seat was taken by Jack Beattie.

Away from politics, Duff was President of the St. Andrews Society from 1925 to 1926 as well as President of the Belfast Scottish Association.

Civic offices
Preceded by Henry McKeag	High Sheriff of Belfast; 1923–1924	Succeeded by Hugh McLaurin
Parliament of Northern Ireland
New parliament	Member of Parliament for Belfast East; 1921–1925; With: Herbert Dixon; Thompson Donald; Dawson Bates	Succeeded by Herbert Dixon; Dawson Bates; Jack Beattie; James Woods Gyle
