= David McGreevy =

Irish Gaelic footballer and sports organiser

David McGreevy (born 1985), is an Irish former Gaelic footballer and sports organiser. He played inter-county football for London GAA and was part of the London team that reached the 2013 Connacht Senior Football Championship final. He is also a co-founder of East Belfast GAA, a cross-community Gaelic games club established in 2020.

== Playing career ==
McGreevy is originally from Teconnaught, County Down. He moved to London in 2009 and played club football with Kingdom Kerry Gaels.

McGreevy played for the London senior football team and later served as captain. He was a member of the London side that reached the 2013 Connacht Senior Football Championship final, losing to Mayo. London subsequently reached Round 4 of the All-Ireland qualifiers, where they were defeated by Cavan at Croke Park.

In 2016, McGreevy discussed the development of London football and the increasing role of English-born players in an interview with GAA.ie.

== East Belfast GAA ==
In May 2020, McGreevy and Richard Maguire co-founded East Belfast GAA after launching the club through a social media appeal seeking players, coaches and volunteers from all backgrounds.

The club was established with a cross-community ethos and attracted significant attention because it was founded in an area of Belfast that had not hosted a GAA club for several decades.

East Belfast GAA experienced rapid growth after its formation, fielding teams in men's football, ladies' football, hurling and camogie. The club has been the subject of coverage by Irish and international media because of its growth and community outreach work.

In 2025, McGreevy stated that the growth of East Belfast GAA suggested there was scope for additional Gaelic games clubs to be established in East Belfast in the future.
