= National school =

National school may refer to:

- National school (Ireland), a state-funded primary school in the Republic of Ireland
- National school (England and Wales), a Church of England school founded by the National Society in England and Wales in the 19th century
- National school (Sri Lanka), a school funded and administered by the central government (rather than a province)
- in Education in Malaysia, a government-run Malay-medium primary school

== See also ==
- Colegio Nacional (disambiguation) ("National School" in Spanish)
