= World ORT =

International Jewish education organization

- Общество Ремесленного Труда
- Established: 1880; 146 years ago
- Founded at: Saint Petersburg, Russian Empire
- Registration no.: 1042541
- Headquarters: London, United Kingdom
- President: Conrad Giles
- Website: ort.org

ORT (Russian: Общество Ремесленного Труда, romanized: Obshchestvo Remeslenava Truda, lit. 'Association for the Promotion of Skilled Trades'), also known as the Organisation for Rehabilitation through Training, is a global education network driven by Jewish values. It promotes education and training in communities worldwide. Its activities throughout its history have spanned more than 100 countries and five continents. It was founded in 1880 in Saint Petersburg to provide professional and vocational training for young Jews.

== Overview ==
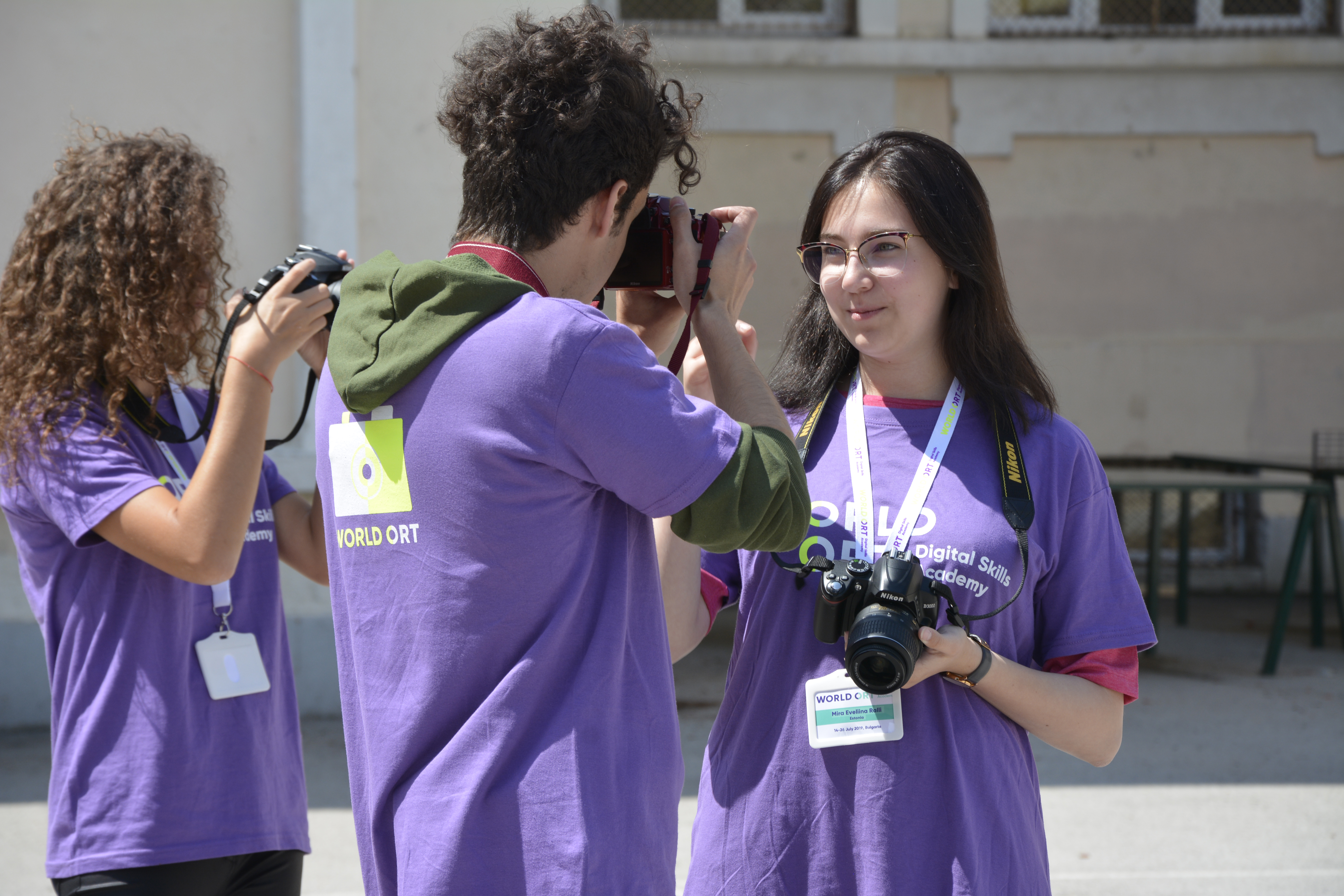
ORT students at a digital skills academy in Bulgaria, summer 2019

World ORT is a federation of autonomous ORT national organisations. In 2005 ORT's global budget exceeded US$250 million annually. As of 2016, its annual budget was US$62.7 million. ORT's current operations are in Israel, the former Soviet Union (including the Baltic States), Europe, Latin America, and South Africa. ORT also runs International Cooperation programs.

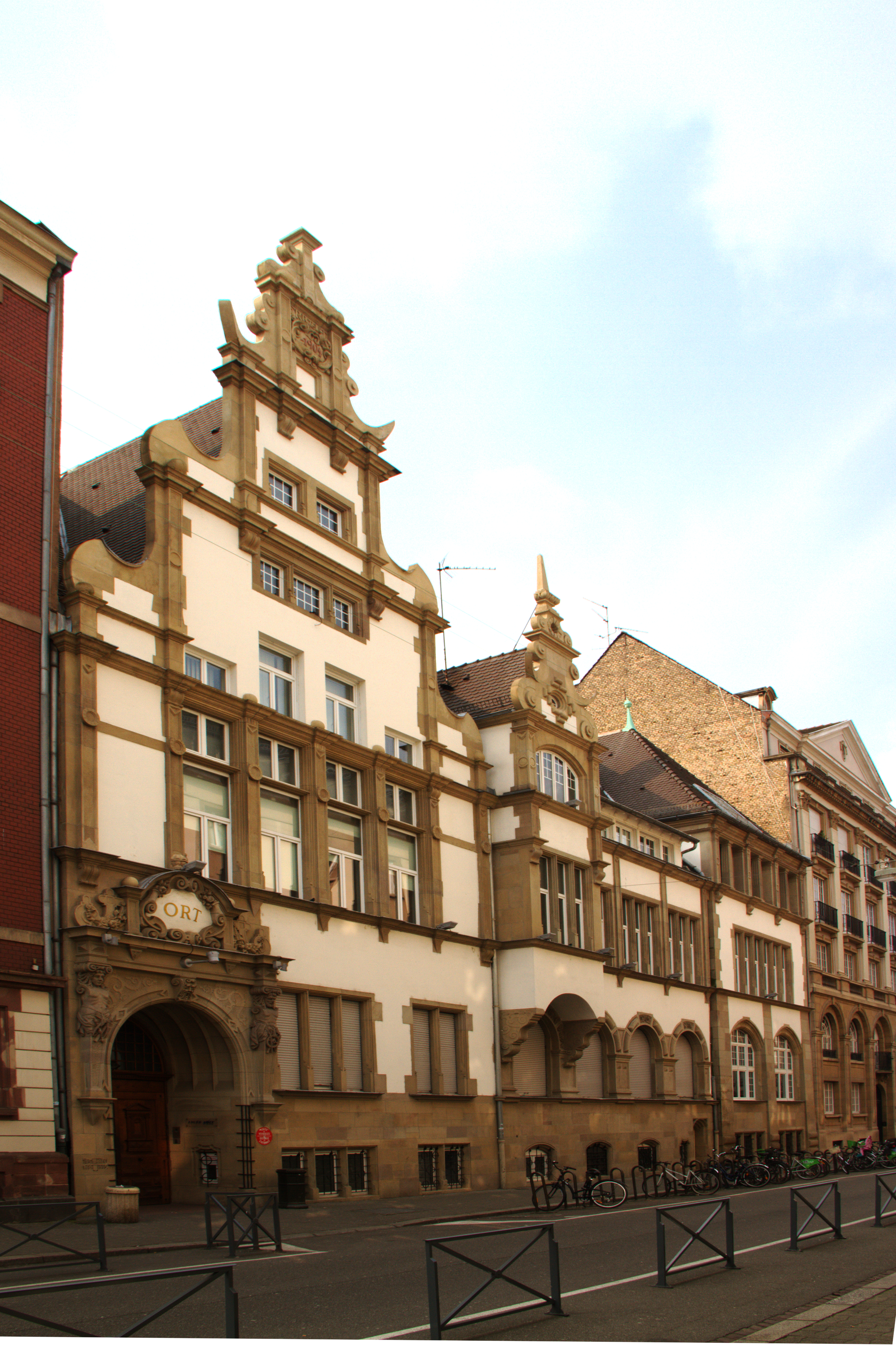
ORT in Strasbourg, France

In 2003 Israel was the area of ORT's largest operation, with 90,000 students educated or trained at ORT's 159 schools, colleges and institutions, educating 25% of Israel’s hi-tech workforce. However, in 2006 ORT Israel withdrew from World ORT. World ORT continues to work in Israel under the name of Kadima Mada-Educating for Life, working with the Israeli Ministry of Education, other Israeli ministries, regional councils and hospitals providing increased resources and improved facilities and schools equipment. World ORT raises funds through its membership organisations in different countries and through the Jewish Federations of North America (JFNA).

World ORT is legally constituted in Switzerland, but operates from offices in London, England. It has consultative status for information and education purposes with UNESCO, and observer status at the International Labour Organization

ORT is a founding member of ICVA (International Council of Voluntary Agencies).

== History ==
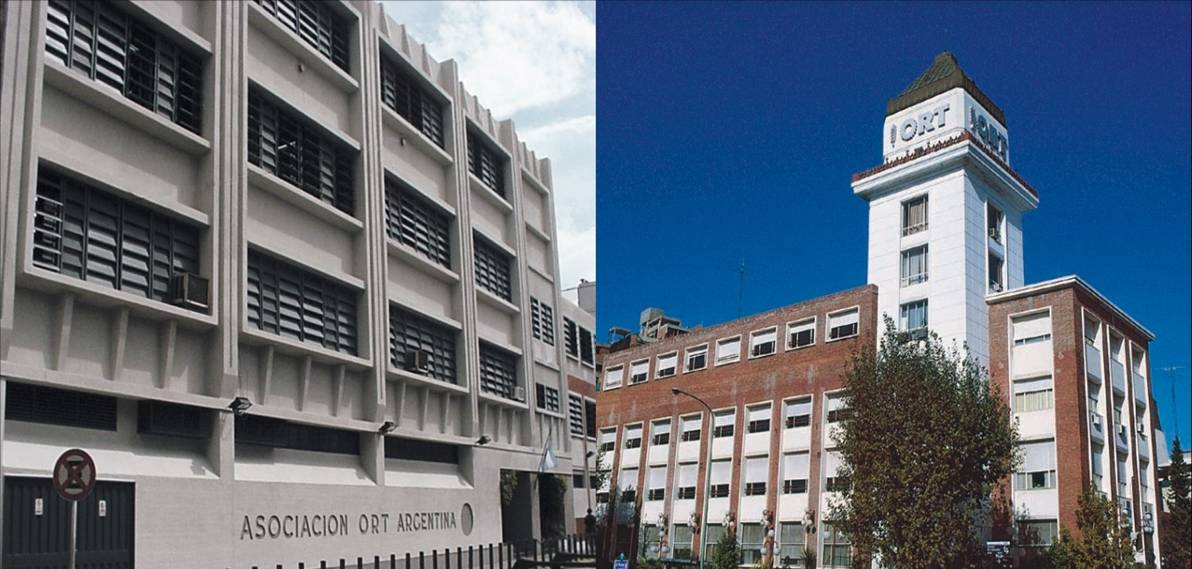
ORT in Argentina

The second partition of Poland in 1793 had resulted in a sharp increase in the number of Jews in Russia, so that in 1794 Empress Catherine the Great decreed that the majority of them would henceforth be restricted to living and working in the Pale of Settlement. The Jews were not allowed to leave the Pale or own land outside it. They were removed from their homes and villages and once resettled, barred from all but a handful of professions. The crowded conditions and legal barriers to self-sufficiency led to deepening poverty for the Pale's four million inhabitants. After the reforms of Tsar Alexander II in the 1860s, the situation improved for some Jews but those in the Pale remained trapped by economic hardship and dismal conditions. In 1880, Samuel Polyakov, Horace de Gunzburg and Nikolai Bakst petitioned Tsar Alexander II for permission to start an assistance fund which would improve the lives of the millions of Russian Jews then living in poverty. The fund would provide education and training in practical occupations like handicrafts and agricultural skills and would help people to help themselves.

Permission was granted and the appeal was sent out, signed by Poliakov and de Gunzburg as well as Abram Zak, Leon Rosenthal and Meer Fridland, leading to the establishment of the Society for Trades and Agricultural Labor among the Jews in Russia. In its first 25 years, ORT raised educational standards and provided training to 25,000 Jews across the Russian Empire. People trained as artisans in glass-blowing, learned sewing and gardening, trained as mechanics, cabinetmakers, and furniture designers

The first programs created by ORT were dictated by the demands of the market. In 1909, the industrialization in Russia created a need for artisans, so ORT developed courses for electricians in Vilna where electric streetcars were being introduced. They offered automotive courses in St. Petersburg when the automobile began taking root there in 1910. ORT's training programs varied to meet the needs of Jews depending on where they lived and what the gaps in the workforce were. That flexibility and diversity meant that ORT became an established educational leader in many fields within only its first few decades of existence.

After World War I, ORT opened agricultural schools to provide tools and training for agricultural enterprises. ORT headquarters moved to Berlin in 1921, after the Bolshevik Revolution. Initially, the Berlin office dealt mainly with fundraising and support for Jewish education in other countries where the Jews were less well-off. When the Nazis rose to power in 1933, Jewish children were expelled from German schools. ORT sought to open a school in Berlin but encountered difficulties due to the ban on selling property to Jews. Using its international ties, the British branch of ORT purchased a school building and dormitory in the Moabit quarter of Berlin. It received authorization to open in April 1937 after promising that all graduates would leave the country upon graduation.

Later ORT headquarters moved to France and finally to Geneva. Local groups such as American ORT and Women's American ORT, ORT Canada and British ORT were formed to support the growing network of programs. In 1938, Stalinist purges forced the closure of ORT programs in the Soviet Union.

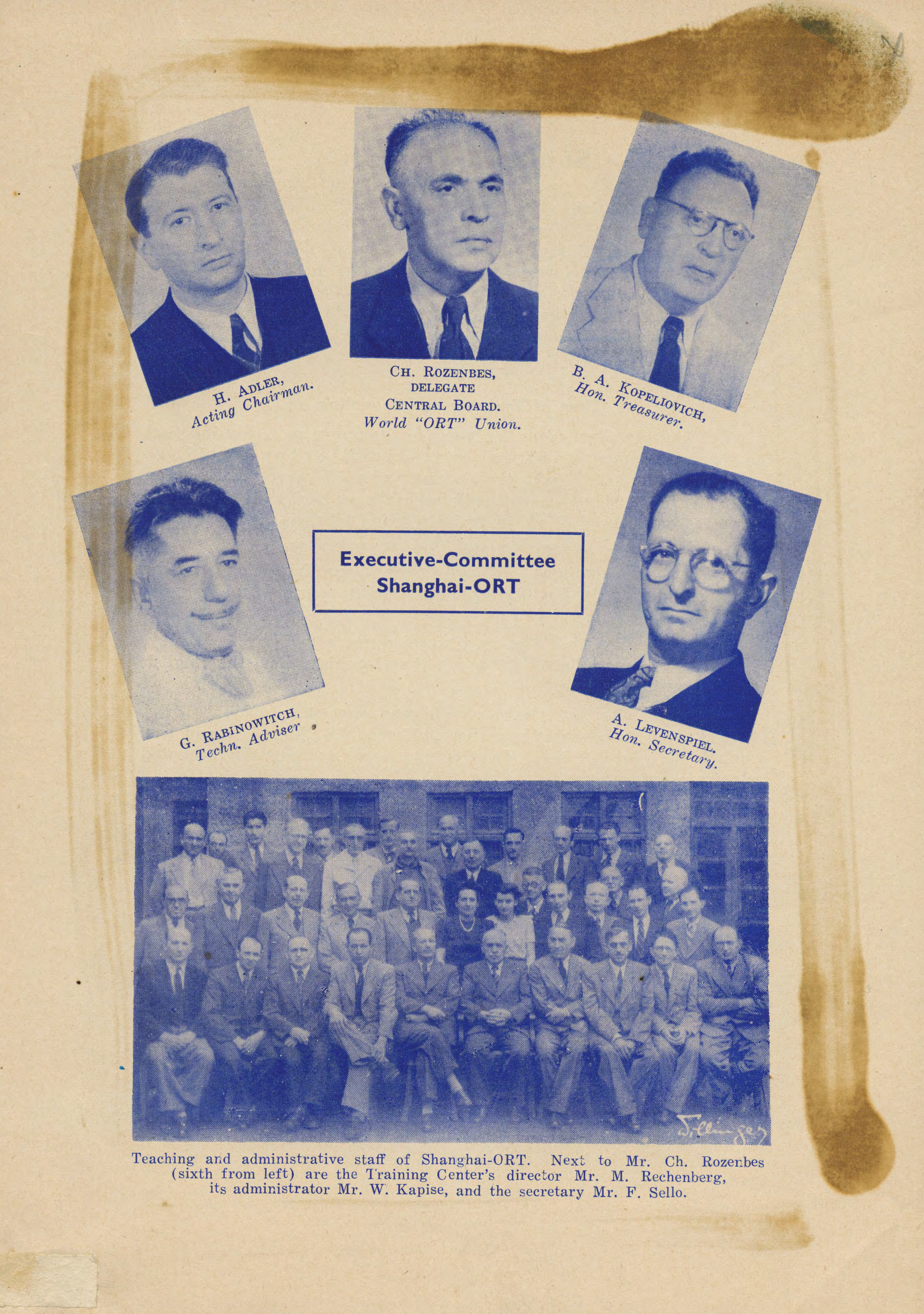
Executive Committee of the Shanghai ORT c. 1940s

During World War II, ORT continued to serve Jewish communities, including those under Nazi occupation. In the Warsaw Ghetto, the German authorities gave ORT permission to open vocational training courses. Those courses continued throughout the war and until the liquidation of the ghetto. They served as a template for similar ORT programs in other Jewish centers like Łódź and Kaunas.

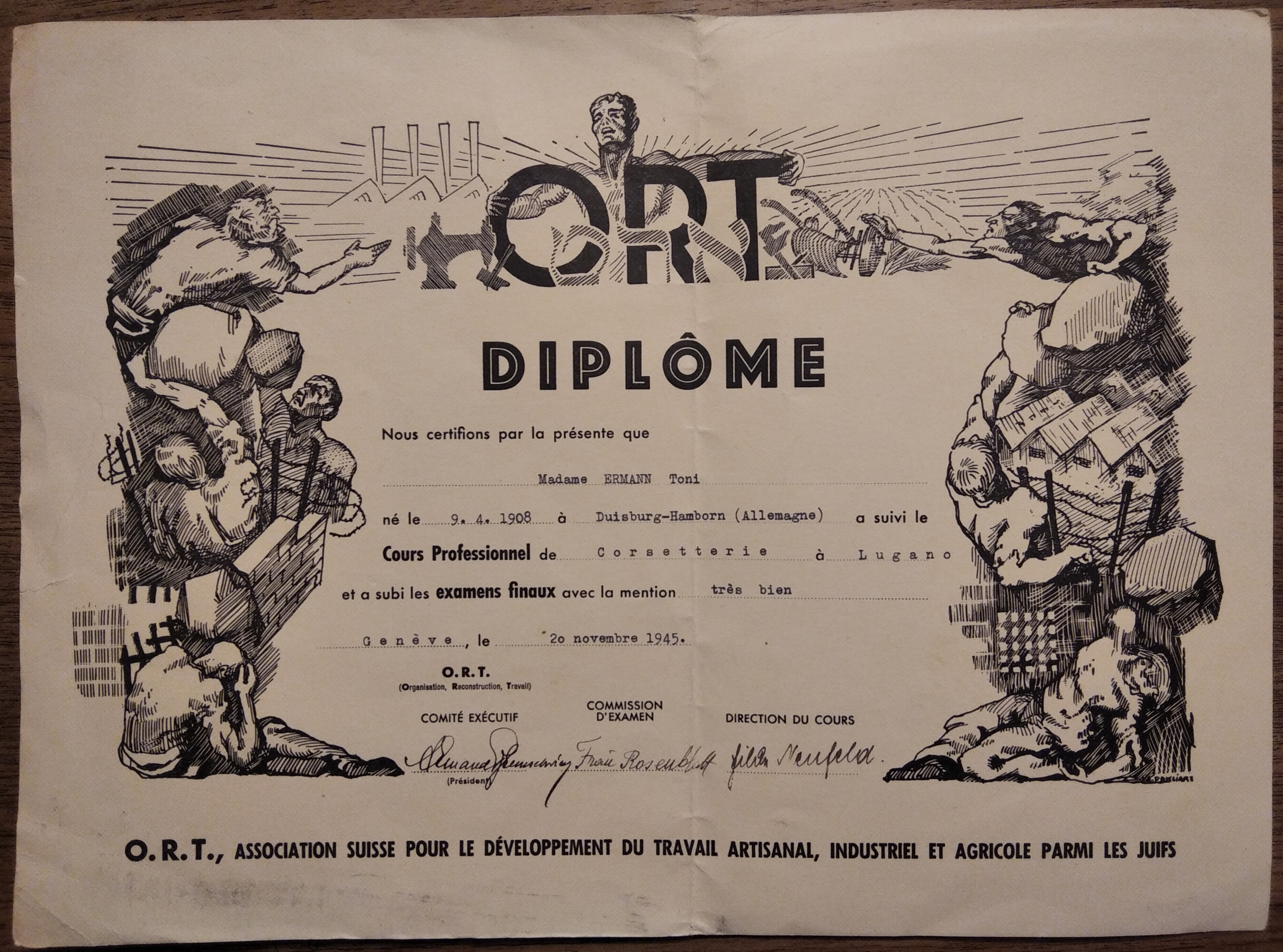
An ORT certificate of professional training in corsetterie (embroidery), given to the Holocaust survivor Toni Ermann, Geneve, 1945 https://ortarchive.ort.org/

After the end of World War II, ORT established rehabilitation programs for the survivors. The first one in Germany was started in August 1945 in the Landsberg DP camp. Vocational training centers were set up in 78 DP (Displaced Persons) Camps in Germany, and nearly 85,000 people acquired professions and the tools they would need to rebuild their lives. Jacob Olejski, a Dachau survivor who had previously organized ORT in Lithuania, was the driving force behind ORT's revival in Germany. After 1948 he organized ORT in the newly founded state of Israel.

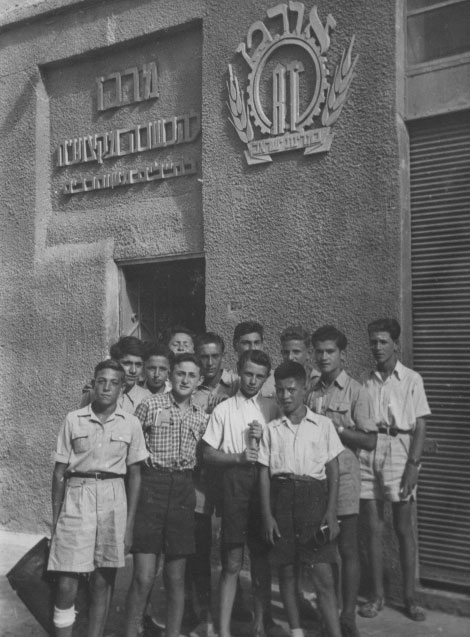
ORT in Jaffa, 1947

ORT operations in Israel started in Jaffa and Jerusalem, and although the Iron Curtain forced the closure of ORT's activities in Eastern Europe, in the 1950s ORT activity increased in Western Europe, Algeria, Morocco, Tunisia, Iran and India.

During the second half of the 20th century, ORT continued to provide education and relief services to Jewish communities in Israel, Africa and Asia while opening new programs to serve the Latin American Jewish communities in Argentina (ORT Argentina), Brazil and Uruguay (ORT Uruguay). In the early 1990s ORT returned to the former Soviet Union and the Baltic States, where it now serves 27,000 students in 58 schools and educational institutions every year.

In 2000, World ORT celebrated its 120th anniversary. The educational services provided through their network continues and has now been supplemented by programs intended to deliver basic nutrition, clothing, books and school supplies, counseling and other services designed to meet the growing emotional needs of students as well

== Current and ongoing programs ==
In addition to technical and financial support for its network of schools and programs in more than 30 countries around the world, ORT has in the past run campaigns including:

- The Latin America Campaign: In 2006–7, ORT began a major program of new projects intended to create a sense of unity and connection throughout the region, meeting the highly individual and specific needs of each community. This campaign was active in small Jewish communities as well as larger ones. For example, the two ORT Argentina high schools in Buenos Aires are overcrowded and a new high school is planned to accommodate the students there. At the same time, the Jewish community in Montevideo (where ORT operates a university), is getting much needed scholarship funds. In México, ORT founded the first university in Latin America fully focused on strengthening the social sector, ORT University Mexico.
- World ORT Kadima Mada in Israel: Kadima Mada is World ORT's arm in Israel and has run since 2007, delivering electronic, science and computer labs as well as technology education to students in schools throughout Israel, most of which are in northern Israel, and in the south of the country close to the border with Gaza. New computer labs and whiteboard technology provide a new opportunity for students. The program works with local authorities, in cooperation with the Ministry of Education, and marks a new phase in ORT's commitment to bring the best practical education available to the Jewish State.
- Regeneration CIS: This program aimed to bring quality Judaic and general high school education to Jewish communities throughout the independent sovereign states of the region that was formerly the Soviet Union. In order to complete its mission for the renewed program, ORT ensures that equipment and services in existing centers are maintained and fully operational, to upgrade systems to enable them to deliver enhanced options, to provide school-wide training to ensure that all staff is able to deliver the new materials, and to provide ongoing staffing and resources. In the new centers, ORT carries out necessary refurbishments, plans and installs new systems and services, trains staff, and provides ongoing staffing and support.

== Locations ==
- North America: ORT America and ORT Canada fundraise for World ORT programs around the globe.
- Latin America: Locations of ORT programs in Latin America include: Argentina, Brazil, Chile, Cuba, Mexico, Panama, Peru, and Uruguay.
- Asia: ORT ran programs in India and has an affiliate school in Singapore.
- Africa: A global aid program previously ran in a number of African countries. The center of operations is currently South Africa with occasional courses in countries including Burkina Faso.
- Europe: Schools, courses and fundraising run and take place in countries including: France, United Kingdom, Italy, Spain, Netherlands, Switzerland, Bulgaria, Czech Republic, Russia, Ukraine, Moldova, Estonia, Lithuania, Latvia and Belarus.
- Israel: The Kadima Mada school network runs in Israel along with extra-curricular and vocational training.
