= IMPA coding =

The Marine Stores Guide, published and licensed by the International Marine Purchasing Association (IMPA) is widely considered to be the world's leading reference source in the marine industry for maritime purchasing and supply. The Guide provides a universal coding system to facilitate communication between crew, owner and supplier, making the specification and supply of goods simple, quick and effective. This aims to bridge the language barrier and offer worldwide shipping companies an easy way to order goods.

This system has been used for over 40 years, growing from a small item list to a 50,000+ unique-item list.

== History ==
The International Marine Purchasing Association (IMPA) was formed in 1978 by a group of senior purchasing executives who wanted to create an industry "voice" to represent the interests of the purchasing profession within shipping and promote close cooperation and understanding between buyers and suppliers. Since then, IMPA has grown significantly and now represents close to 1000 members from across the world; ship-owners, -operators and -managers account for purchaser members and manufacturers and ship suppliers make up supplier members.

== Operation ==
The Association is run by a council of individuals from both the purchasing and the supply side. The council is responsible for directing the duties of the Secretariat and formulating the strategy for the Association. The day-to-day operation of the Association is run by a contracted administration office based in Colchester, represented by Stephen Alexander, IMPA Secretary General and COO.

Members of the council are not paid for their role within the council and the Association is run primarily as a not for profit organisation seeking to benefit members and their organisations through the creation of industry initiatives, products and services.

The IMPA Act is an organizational programme which aligns marine suppliers' operations with the objectives of the United Nations Global Compact.

== See also ==
- Maritime Informatics
