= Belfast Victoria (UK Parliament constituency) =

Parliamentary constituency in the United Kingdom, 1918–1922

- Former borough constituency for the House of Commons

1918–1922
- Seats: 1
- Created from: Belfast East
- Replaced by: Belfast East

Victoria, a division of Belfast, was a UK parliamentary constituency in Ireland. It returned one Member of Parliament (MP) to the House of Commons of the United Kingdom from 1918 to 1922, using the first past the post electoral system.

== Boundaries and boundary changes ==
The constituency was created by the Redistribution of Seats (Ireland) Act 1918 from an area which had been in the Belfast East constituency. It comprised the north-eastern half of East Belfast, and contained the Dock and Victoria wards of Belfast City Council.

It was in use at the 1918 general election only, and under the Government of Ireland Act 1920 its area was again part of the Belfast East constituency, with effect from the 1922 general election.

== Politics ==
The constituency was strongly unionist, but with significant labour support. The unionists ran a candidate from the Ulster Unionist Labour Association, a group affiliated with the Unionist Party, as a Labour Unionist. He easily won the seat. A Belfast Labour Party candidate was in second place. Sinn Féin demonstrated republican weakness in the seat by receiving only 539 votes, in the 1918 election.

== First Dáil ==
After the 1918 election, Sinn Féin invited all those elected for constituencies in Ireland to sit as TDs in Dáil Éireann rather than in the House of Commons of the United Kingdom. All those elected for Irish constituencies were included in the roll of the Dáil but only those elected for Sinn Féin sat in the First Dáil. In May 1921, the Dáil passed a resolution declaring that elections to the House of Commons of Northern Ireland and the House of Commons of Southern Ireland would be used as the election for the Second Dáil and that the First Dáil would be dissolved on the assembly of the new body. The area of Belfast Victoria would then have been represented in the Dáil by the four-seat constituency of Belfast East, which also returned no representatives for Sinn Féin.

== Members of Parliament ==
Election	Member	Party
1918	Thompson Donald	Labour Unionist
1922	Thompson Donald	constituency abolished

== Election ==
1918 general election: Belfast Victoria
Party	Candidate	Votes	%	±%
Labour Unionist	Thompson Donald	9,309	69.90	
Belfast Labour	Robert Waugh	3,469	26.05	
Sinn Féin	Winifred Carney	539	4.05	
Majority		5,840	43.85	
Turnout		19,494	68.31	
Labour Unionist win (new seat)				

== See also ==
- List of United Kingdom Parliament constituencies in Ireland and Northern Ireland
- List of MPs elected in the 1918 United Kingdom general election
- Historic Dáil constituencies
