= David Bleakley =

Northern Irish politician and peace campaigner

Member of the Constitutional Convention for Belfast East
- In office 1975–1976
- Preceded by: Convention established
- Succeeded by: Convention dissolved

Member of the Northern Ireland Assembly for Belfast East
- In office 28 June 1973 – 1974
- Preceded by: Assembly established
- Succeeded by: Assembly abolished

Minister for Community Relations
- In office 25 March 1971 – 25 September 1971
- Prime Minister: Brian Faulkner
- Preceded by: Robert Simpson
- Succeeded by: Basil McIvor

Member of the House of Commons for Belfast Victoria
- In office 20 March 1958 – 25 November 1965
- Preceded by: Bill Henderson
- Succeeded by: Roy Bradford

Personal details
- Born: 11 January 1925 Strandtown, Belfast, Northern Ireland
- Died: 26 June 2017 (aged 92)
- Party: Labour Party of Northern Ireland (1998 - 2016); Independent (1979 - 1992); NI Labour (before 1979)
- Other political affiliations: Democratic Partnership (1996); Alliance (1992 - 1996)

David Wylie Bleakley CBE (11 January 1925 – 26 June 2017) was a Northern Irish politician and peace campaigner.

== Biography ==
=== Background ===
Born in the Strandtown district of Belfast, Bleakley worked as an electrician in the Harland and Wolff dockyards while becoming increasingly active in his trade union. He studied economics at Ruskin College in Oxford, where he struck up a friendship with C. S. Lewis about whom he later wrote a centenary memoir. He later attended Queen's University, Belfast. A committed Christian, he was a lifelong Anglican – a member of the Church of Ireland. Throughout his life, he was a lay preacher.

=== Political career ===
Bleakley joined the Northern Ireland Labour Party (NILP) and contested the Northern Ireland Parliament seat of Belfast Victoria in 1949 and 1953 before finally winning it in 1958. At Stormont, he was made the chairman of the Public Accounts Committee, but he lost his seat in 1965. Bleakley was head of the department of economics and political studies at Methodist College Belfast from 1969 to 1979.

Bleakley ran for the Westminster seat of Belfast East in 1970 (gaining 41% of the vote), February 1974 and October 1974 for the Northern Ireland Labour Party each time, but never enough to win the Westminster seat from the UUP. In 1971, Brian Faulkner appointed him as his Minister for Community Relations at Stormont, but as Bleakley was not an MP, he could only hold this post for six months. He resigned five days before his term expired in order to highlight his disagreement with government policy, specifically the failure to widen the government to include non-Unionist parties, and the decision to introduce internment. Bleakley wrote a respectful biography of Faulkner and his own memoir of the period.

After the Parliament was abolished, Bleakley stood for, and was elected to, the Northern Ireland Assembly and its successor, the Northern Ireland Constitutional Convention. He stood again for Belfast East in the February and October UK general elections, but won only 14% of the vote each time.

Bleakley was appointed to a position as a visiting professor in the University of Bradford's Department of Peace Studies by Professor Adam Curle soon after the department's founding in 1973.

By the late 1970s, the NILP was in disarray, and did not stand a candidate for the 1979 European Assembly election. Bleakley instead stood as an "Independent Community Candidate", but took only 1.6% of the votes cast.

During the 1980s, Bleakley sat as a non-partisan member of various quangos. From 1980 to 1992 he was general secretary of the Irish Council of Churches. In 1992, he joined the Alliance Party of Northern Ireland and was an advisor to the group during the all-party talks. For the 1996 Northern Ireland Forum election, he was a prominent member of the Democratic Partnership list and stood in Belfast East, but was not elected. In 1998, he joined the Labour Party of Northern Ireland and stood in Belfast East in the Assembly elections, receiving 369 first preference votes. He died on 26 June 2017 at the age of 92.

== Honours ==
In 1984 he was appointed CBE for his work as chairman of the Northern Ireland Standing Advisory Commission on Human Rights.

== Publications ==
- Faulkner – Conflict and Consent in Irish Politics, A R Mowbray, London 1974.
- Peace in Ulster, A R Mowbray, London, 1972.
- C. S. Lewis, at Home in Ireland, Strandtown Press, Bangor, Northern Ireland, 1998. ISBN 9781898787679.

Parliament of Northern Ireland
Preceded by Bill Henderson	Member of Parliament for Belfast Victoria; 1958–1965	Succeeded by Roy Bradford
Northern Ireland Assembly (1973)
New assembly	Assembly Member for East Belfast; 1973–1974	Assembly abolished
Northern Ireland Constitutional Convention
New convention	Member for East Belfast; 1975–1976	Convention dissolved
Party political offices
Preceded by W. Blair	Chair of the Northern Ireland Labour Party; 1957–1958	Succeeded by Andrew Gibson
Political offices
Preceded by Robert Simpson	Minister of Community Relations; 1971	Succeeded by Basil McIvor
