= Basil McIvor =

Northern Irish politician (1928–2004)

Minister for Education
- In office 1 January 1974 – 28 May 1974
- Preceded by: Position created
- Succeeded by: Position abolished

Member of the Northern Ireland Assembly for South Belfast
- In office 28 June 1973 – 1974
- Preceded by: Assembly established
- Succeeded by: Assembly abolished

Minister for Community Relations
- In office 26 October 1971 – 1972
- Prime Minister: Brian Faulkner
- Preceded by: David Bleakley
- Succeeded by: Office abolished

Member of the Northern Ireland House of Commons for Larkfield
- In office 24 February 1969 – 1973
- Preceded by: Constituency created
- Succeeded by: Parliament abolished

Personal details
- Born: 17 June 1928 Tullyhommon, County Fermanagh, Northern Ireland
- Died: 5 November 2004 (aged 76)
- Party: Ulster Unionist

William Basil McIvor OBE, PC (NI) (17 June 1928 – 5 November 2004) was an Ulster Unionist politician, a minister in Northern Ireland's first power-sharing Executive, a barrister and a pioneer of integrated education.

== Early life and education ==
The son of Rev. Frederick McIvor, a Methodist clergyman, McIvor was born in Tullyhommon, the County Fermanagh part of the village of Pettigo, the rest of which is in County Donegal, the village straddling the Northern Ireland border. McIvor attended Methodist College, Belfast, and the Queen's University of Belfast and was called to the Bar of Northern Ireland in 1950. In his career at the Bar, Basil McIvor became Junior Crown Counsel and a Resident Magistrate in the 1970s.

== Political career ==
He was elected to the Northern Ireland Parliament as Ulster Unionist Party MP for Larkfield in the 1969 election. He was one of a group of MPs who supported the beleaguered Prime Minister, Terence O'Neill. Viewed as a liberal he was given the job of Minister for Community Relations by Brian Faulkner in 1971 and resigned from the Orange Order.

McIvor was a member of the Northern Ireland Assembly, 1973, topping the poll in Belfast South, and a member of the Ulster Unionist contingent who negotiated the Sunningdale Agreement in 1973. When the power-sharing Executive was set up in the aftermath of Sunningdale, McIvor headed the Education Department in the new power-sharing executive, over which Faulkner presided as First Minister.

As Minister of Education, McIvor advanced plans for what has since become known as integrated education. He proposed that, in addition to the existing (Catholic) Maintained Schools and the (non-Catholic) Controlled Schools, there should be "shared schools", "available to Catholic and Protestant parents alike who wished to have their children educated together". Disregarding a message from Cardinal William Conway "not to interfere with the schools", McIvor, with Faulkner's support brought the proposal to the Executive where he recalls it being welcomed by all, save Hume. Hume was "less than enthusiastic".

The executive lasted but five months, brought down in May 1974 by the Ulster Workers Council strike. McIvor believed that much of the responsibility lay with the determination of the Unionists' Social Democratic and Labour Party partners to "achieve all-Ireland institutions that would produce the dynamic that could lead ultimately to an agreed single state of Ireland". The insistence of their deputy leader John Hume on a cross-border Council of Ireland, in particular, blew "out the light at the end of the tunnel". For the survival power sharing Hume's "grim and unbending" approach was a "disaster". (After the 1998 Belfast Agreement, McIvor did allow that Hume had "courageously done much to promote peace in Northern Ireland within the context of his nationalist aspirations, and [had] been a force in compelling Unionists, and rightly so, to engage in dialogue with their arch enemy, Sinn Féin).

After the fall of the executive, The McIvor left politics and sat as a resident magistrate.

In 1987, he was subject of a motion tabled in the United Kingdom House of Commons by four UUP MPs who accused him of showing bias against unionists and members of the Orange Order in a County Antrim case and so demanded McIvor's removal from the bench.

== Investigations ==
McIvor presided over the initial investigation into UVF supergrass William 'Budgie' Allen and that of several people accused of killing two corporals in Belfast.

== Campaigning ==
In 1981, McIvor became the first chairman of Lagan College, Northern Ireland's first integrated secondary school. When Sinn Féin's Martin McGuinness became education minister he invited him to visit the college. He was also a governor of Campbell College, Belfast from 1975 until his death.

Basil McIvor died on 5 November 2004 aged 76 while playing golf at Royal County Down.

== Family ==
His son Jonathan McIvor was a senior police officer in both the Metropolitan Police Service and the Police Service of Northern Ireland (PSNI) as well as providing law enforcement advice to the European Union Police Mission for the Palestinian Territories

As a Chief Inspector in the Metropolitan Police Service, he was criticised by the Stephen Lawrence Inquiry for his failure to manage the initial investigation of the scene of the murder of Stephen Lawrence.

Basil McIvor was appointed an OBE in the 1991 New Year Honours.

== Books ==
- Basil McIvor, Hope Deferred: Experiences of an Irish Unionist, Blackstaff Press, Belfast, 1998. (autobiography)

Parliament of Northern Ireland
New constituency	Member of Parliament for Larkfield; 1969–1973	Parliament abolished
Northern Ireland Assembly (1973)
New assembly	Assembly Member for South Belfast; 1973–1974	Assembly abolished
Political offices
Preceded by David Bleakley	Minister for Community Relations; 1971–1972	position abolished
