= Bill Henderson (Northern Ireland politician) =

Northern Irish politician (1924–2010)

Captain Bill Henderson

Member of the Northern Ireland House of Commons
- In office 1953–1958
- Constituency: Belfast Victoria

Personal details
- Born: 17 August 1924; Dublin, Ireland
- Died: 22 October 2010 (aged 86); Holywood, Belfast, Northern Ireland
- Political party: Ulster Unionist Party

Captain Oscar William James Henderson OBE DL (17 August 1924 – 22 October 2010), known as Bill Henderson was a Northern Ireland newspaper owner and legislator who, as a member of the Ulster Unionist Party, represented the constituency of Belfast Victoria in the Northern Ireland House of Commons.

Henderson was the son of Royal Navy Commander Oscar Henderson, CVO CBE DSO and Alicia Mary Henry. He was raised at Hillsborough Castle, the official residence of the monarch in Northern Ireland, where his father served as private secretary and comptroller general to the James Hamilton, 3rd Duke of Abercorn, the first Governor of Northern Ireland. His younger brother was the television executive Robert Brumwell "Brum" Henderson.

Henderson served in World War II as part of the Irish Guards regiment of the British Army and, in 1949, achieved the honorary rank of captain. In the aftermath of 1953 Northern Ireland general election, he became a member of the Northern Ireland House of Commons for the safe Belfast Victoria seat. His election saw the Unionist majority against Labour slashed from 8,907 in 1949 to 1,662. In 1958 he narrowly lost the seat to David Bleakley. The same year he was appointed, at Ulster Television, to the executive position of director, before taking up the post of managing director of the Belfast Newsletter and then moving to Chairman of Century Newspapers in 1964.

Henderson's family owned the Newsletter from 1844 until 1991. From 1964 to 1991, he was the final member of the Henderson family to be in control of the publication and, by the time of his retirement, was the only member of a three-person Board with executive responsibilities. Century Newspapers, the holding company, sold the title to Thompson Regional Newspapers in 1991 as the family could no longer guarantee the viability of the paper following Bill Henderson's retirement despite attempts to hire suitably qualified management.

Between 1970 and 1981 he was President of Knock Motor Cycle & Car Club in Belfast and, in Spring 2005, became a trustee of the Ulster Reform Club.

Parliament of Northern Ireland
Preceded by Robert Alexander	Member of Parliament for Belfast Victoria; 1953–1958	Succeeded by David Bleakley
