= Maritime Informatics =

Maritime Informatics is a thematic topic within the broader discipline of informatics. It can be considered as both a field of study and domain of application. As an application domain, it is the outlet of innovations originating from data science and artificial intelligence; as a field of study, it is positioned between computer science and marine engineering.

== Beginnings of maritime informatics ==
As a result of the increasing levels of digitalisation occurring in the maritime sector starting around 2010 and stimulated by the EU-endorsed MonaLisa project for sea traffic management (STM), a number of academics and shipping industry leaders recognised that the maritime transportation sector would benefit from a specific field of study and application to be known as Maritime Informatics - the use of information systems, data sharing and data analytics in the business and operations of maritime transportation. They considered that it would lead to improvements in efficiency, safety, resilience, and ecological sustainability - all of which are currently lacking for many aspects of sea transport.

One of the first public airings of the concept of Maritime Informatics was a presentation delivered on 11 September 2014 in Gothenburg, Sweden. A proposal for an inaugural minitrack on Maritime Informatics was accepted for the 2015 Americas Conference on Information Systems in Puerto Rico where three papers were presented. Since then numerous publications has been brought forward captured at www.maritimeinformatics.org and in late 2020 the first reference book on Maritime Informatics was co-written by 81 expert contributors (47 practitioners and 34 researchers) from 20 countries.

Most impactful authors and journals in the domain have been documented in a review paper. Dimitrios Zissis, Luca Cazzanti and Leonardo M. Millefiori are the top three authors; top journals and conferences include Ocean Engineering, Proceedings of the 12th ACM International Conference on Distributed and Event-based Systems, Sensors, the international Conference On Engineering, Technology And Innovation, Expert Systems With Applications, IEEE Access, and Journal of Navigation.

== Background ==
The shipping industry has several particular organisational aspects that are recognised and taken into account in maritime informatics:

- It is predominantly a self-organising ecosystem
- Many activities are undertaken as part of episodic tight coupling
- There is a so-called maritime stack
- There is increasing pressure to balance capital productivity and energy efficiency
- There is the potential virtuous interplay between different types of systems

== Data sharing ==
Digital data sharing is key to the all-important, arguably fundamental, data analytics aspects of maritime informatics because it opens the way for better access to relevant and reliable data. As in land-based commerce, digital data sharing is a growing phenomenon in maritime operations - though there is a way to go. It is enabling greater transparency for all those involved in the transportation of goods and passengers, not least being the end-customer. This leads to better and more informed decision-making and planning by all those involved. The push for digitalisation and data sharing is being pursued both by governments and the commercial sector. For example, the Member States of the IMO agreed a mandatory requirement for their governments to introduce electronic information exchange between ships and ports as from 8 April 2019. Meanwhile, commercial operators, particularly in the container lines are putting systems in place for sharing data for mutual benefit in their operations. Data sharing is an important aspect of the Port Collaborative Decision Making (PortCDM) and Port Call Optimization initiatives, both of which seek to improve the coordination, synchronization and efficiency of the port call process by enabling a common and shared situational awareness among all those involved.

== Standardisation ==
The availability and sharing of relevant digital data underpins maritime informatics and is key to more effective and efficient coordination and synchronisation in the predominantly self-organising ecosystem that is maritime transportation. For this to occur, a high priority underpinning maritime informatics is the encouragement of standardised digital data exchange and data sharing, leading, in turn, to improvements in shipping analytics. Improved availability of data will support better historical analysis, now-casting and forecasting.

The International Maritime Organization (IMO) FAL Committee is taking the lead in ensuring that the common terms used in the various standards being developed or in use in the maritime sector are compatible and therefore interoperable as far as is practicable, by creating and maintaining The IMO Compendium on Facilitation and Electronic Business. The IMO Compendium consists of an IMO Data Set and IMO Reference Data Model agreed by the main organisations involved in the development of standards for the electronic exchange of information related to the FAL Convention: the World Customs Organization (WCO), the United Nations Economic Commission for Europe (UNECE) and the International Organization for Standardization (ISO). There are several other prominent international governmental and non-governmental organisations actively contributing to the ongoing standardisation and harmonisation process including the UN Electronic Data Interchange for Administration, Commerce and Transport (UN EDIFACT), the Digital Container Shipping Association (DCSA), the International Harbour Masters Association (IHMA) and BIMCO - the world's largest direct-membership organisation for shipowners, charterers, shipbrokers and agents.
