= ORT Argentina =

Jewish educational organization in Argentina

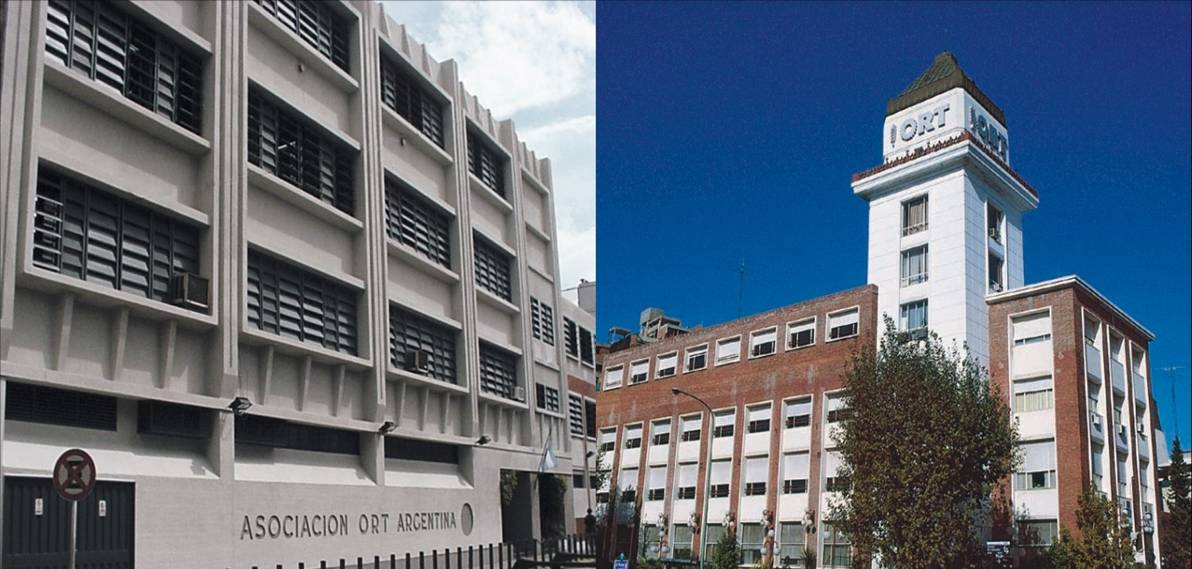
- Formation: 1936
- Type: Organizations based in Argentina
- Legal status: active
- Purpose: education
- Headquarters: Buenos Aires, Argentina
- Region served: Argentina
- Website: http://www.ort.edu.ar http://campus.ort.edu.ar

ORT Argentina is a non-government organization devoted to education. Founded in 1936, it serves the Jewish community in Argentina. There are two ORT Technical Schools in Buenos Aires, a post-secondary Institute of Technology, and a School of Integration of Technology, Management and Business. ORT Argentina employs almost 900 teachers, and its student body exceeds 6000 members. ORT Argentina is affiliated with World ORT.
