= East Belfast Observer =

Northern Irish newspaper

The East Belfast Observer first appeared on 4 March 2004, and after failing to increase circulation above 2000 copies per week, ceased publication following the edition published on Thursday 16 June 2005. The paper was distributed through newsagents throughout east Belfast and North Down, costing 50p per copy.

Published weekly by East Belfast Publishing Ltd, the newspaper was relatively weak on news in comparison to regional papers. The news agenda was focused on local issues in the various communities of east Belfast with a particular focus on politics and followed a broadly unionist editorial.

The paper covered local sport under sports editor, Chris Holt. Coverage of the local football team Glentoran F.C. was particularly strong. Other sport covered by the newspaper included golf, rugby, hockey, pool and notable support of youth sport.

Funding of approximately £250,000 had been raised to launch the newspaper, from the EU-sponsored Peace & Reconciliation funding, but when this funding came to an end, and with the business not generating enough income from sales and advertising to meet costs, the newspaper closed. Attempts had been made to save the paper, firstly by cutting costs including staff, and then by seeking further investment, but this was not forthcoming.

The East Belfast Observer was owned by EastSide Partnership.

== Staff ==
- Maurice Kinkead, Chief Executive and editor
- Geoffrey Ready, deputy editor
- Chris Holt, sport editor
- Alex Crumlin, reporter
- Josephine Long, reporter
- Thomas Slattery, advertising sales manager
