= Dr. Manuel Pizarro Technical School =

EET N°479 Dr. Manuel Pizarro

Location
- Av. Gral Paz 04250; Santa Fe; Argentina
- Coordinates: 32°22′10″S 61°18′25″W

Information
- Established: February 17, 1932
- Director: Marisa Micheletti
- Regent: Luisa Ferreyra
- Grades: 6
- Enrollment: 985 (2008)
- Classrooms: 32
- Area: 100 m^{2} (1,100 sq ft)
- Campus type: Urban
- Careers: Technical equipment and installations electromechanical Process Industries (Chemistry)
- Website: www.escpizarro.com.ar

The EET N°479 Dr. Manuel Pizarro (Escuela Técnica n°479 "Dr. Manuel Demetrio Pizarro) is a public technical high school located in downtown Santa Fe, Argentina. Founded in 1932, it offers professional, technical, and chemical programs.

== Organization of school ==
The school consists of 32 classrooms of which 14 are for classes, three large classrooms and three workshops aimed at teaching Computer and Multimedia, a staff room, the regency, address, vicedirección, head of the workshop, Boards of Chemistry, the central courtyard, two lobbies, preceptoria, room cleaning, bathing men (the biggest), women's bathroom, two rooms Technical drawing (an extensive and another waning). The years of course are six and are in March to November, for all courses.

=== Workshops ===
The workshops are from school rooms or barns where are the manifest activity "axis" of the school, being technical.

== History ==
The establishment was founded 17 February 1932 as the School of Arts and Crafts, in a house at Mariano Comas No. 2441, teaching metalwork, carpentry and small business management. In 1936, it was renamed as School of Mechanical and Electrical Engineering.

On April 9, 1941, the new building, at Av. Gral. Peace 4250, was inaugurated, called Dr. Manuel D. Pizarro for a Minister of Public Instruction. To encourage technical education, the number of trades taught was extended.

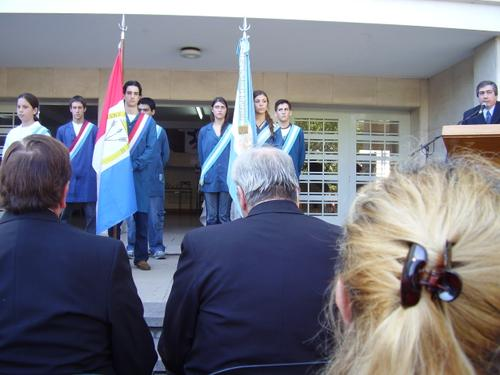
75 years of School Pizarro, April 18, 2007

== See also ==
- Education in Argentina
- National University of the Littoral

== External links (in Spanish) ==
- Motores eléctricos de la escuela
- XVII Olimpiada de Química año 2008
- 40a. Olimpiada Internacional de Química año 2008
- Entrega de fondos para la escuela (Del diario de TV. "Sin Mordaza")
