= East Belfast GAA =

Gaelic games club based in Belfast, County Down, Northern Ireland

East Belfast
- Oirthear Bhéal Feirste
- Founded: 2020
- County: Down
- Colours: Black and Yellow
- Grounds: Henry Jones Playing Fields

Playing kits
Standard colours

East Belfast GAA (Irish: CLG Oirthear Bhéal Feirste) is a Gaelic Athletic Association club based in east Belfast. Founded in 2020, the club is affiliated to Down GAA and fields teams in Gaelic football, Ladies' Gaelic football, hurling and camogie. It is known for its cross-community ethos and for being the first GAA club based in east Belfast for about half a century.

== History ==
The provisional logo of East Belfast GAA before the current crest

Before East Belfast GAA was established, the area had previously been home to St Colmcille's, a Gaelic football club which existed in east Belfast before folding during the early years of the Troubles.

The club was founded in May 2020 by David McGreevy and Richard Maguire, who launched the idea through a social media appeal seeking players, coaches and volunteers from all ages, genders and backgrounds. The initial aim was to explore whether there was enough interest to form an underage team, but the response led to plans for adult teams in men's football, ladies' football, hurling and camogie.

East Belfast played its first competitive men's football match in July 2020 against St Michael's, Magheralin, almost 50 years after St Colmcille's had ceased operating in the area. BBC Sport reported in September 2020 that the club had attracted more than 1,000 members within months of its launch. Northern Ireland Screen also reported in 2022 that the club had more than 1,000 members from a range of backgrounds and walks of life.

== Crest and identity ==
The club crest was unveiled in July 2020. It features the Harland and Wolff cranes, the Red Hand of Ulster, a shamrock and a thistle, with the club motto "Together" included in English, Irish and Ulster-Scots.

The crest was designed by creative director Rory Millar. The club's provisional logo used lettering from the Farset and Feirste typeface, which was developed from Belfast's historic tiled street signs. The typeface was originally developed by John McMillan, Emeritus Professor of Graphic Design at Ulster University, with MuirMcNeil later helping to develop the design for digital use.

Irish language activist Linda Ervine became the club's inaugural president. Her involvement was reported as part of the club's effort to emphasise its cross-community character and appeal beyond traditional GAA audiences.

In 2023, the club hosted an Ulster-Scots event during Ulster-Scots Week, reported as the first event of its kind held by a GAA club.

== Sporting activity and growth ==
East Belfast GAA fields teams in the four main Gaelic games codes: men's football, ladies' football, hurling and camogie.

The club's camogie team won the Down Junior Championship in 2022, defeating Ballela in the final before preparing to represent Down in the Bridie McMenamin Shield. In 2023, the club's hurlers reached the Down Junior Hurling Championship final.

By 2025, The Irish News reported that the club had more than 100 registered players in men's senior football alone, fielded senior teams in all four codes, and had underage teams and a nursery programme for children aged 18 months to four-and-a-half years. The same report stated that East Belfast fielded four senior men's football teams, two senior hurling teams, two senior ladies' football teams and a camogie team.

In October 2024, East Belfast GAA's under-14 girls and under-10 boys teams were invited to play half-time games at the Dublin Senior Football Championship final at Parnell Park.

== Community and development work ==
The club has been the subject of national and international media coverage because of its cross-community ethos and its role in promoting Gaelic games in a part of Belfast where the GAA had not had a club for decades.

In 2022, the club was the subject of Le Chéile, an Irish Language Broadcast Fund documentary series produced by Macha Media and broadcast on BBC Two Northern Ireland and RTÉ One. The series followed the club during its first full year of play in 2021. Belfast Media reported that the series featured East Belfast GAA players including Irial Ó Ceallaigh, Kimberly Robertson, Niamh Daly and Andrew McCammon, and explored how the club welcomed players from different backgrounds. The Irish Examiner also reviewed the series, noting its focus on the club's development during the pandemic and its ability to field men's and women's teams within a year of formation.

GAA.ie profiled Kimberly Robertson as one of the first people to join the club following its launch. The article reported that she became the club's inaugural camogie secretary, was vice-chairperson by the end of its first season, and was later elected chairperson.

In May 2023, Ulster Ladies Gaelic and Ulster Camogie joined with East Belfast GAA and other organisations for the first LGBTQ+ Women's Sports Day at Queen's University Belfast, organised by Sporting Pride Ireland.

In 2024, the club launched a three-year development plan at the Titanic Hotel in Belfast. Ulster GAA reported that the plan included the creation of a Friends of East Belfast GAA group, a cultural subcommittee to promote languages and cultures within the club, and a focus on developing pitches and facilities. Ulster GAA also stated that East Belfast GAA had been recognised in Ulster GAA's 2024-2028 strategic plan as a model club for community engagement.

The Irish News reported in March 2024 that the club was seeking around 15 acres of land in its catchment area to develop a permanent base, potentially in partnership with other sports organisations. In 2024, GAA.ie reported that Belfast City Council had reallocated space at Henry Jones Playing Fields for a full-sized GAA pitch with goalposts.
