= Todos Santos Chocolates =

Chocolate shop in Santa Fe, New Mexico

Coordinates: 35°41′15.3″N 105°56′12.9″W

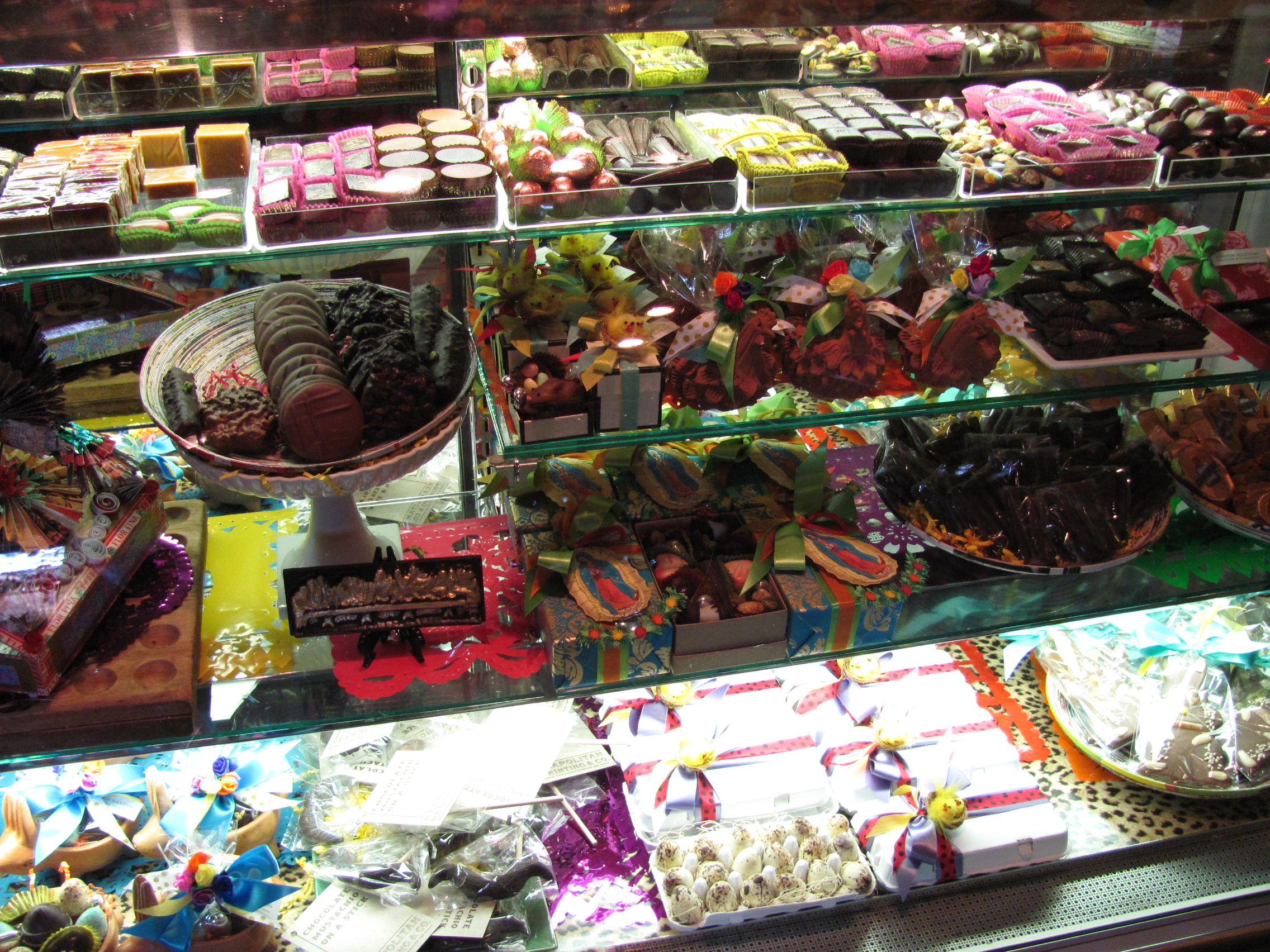
Todos Santos Chocolates

Todos Santos (All Saints in Spanish) is a chocolate shop opened by Hayward Simoneaux in Santa Fe, New Mexico in 1999. He began shaping his confections in the shape of Milagros, "small charmlike silver and gold offerings made to saints" in traditional Hispanic cultures, using custom molds and coatings of silver and gold leaf. Simoneaux's skills with those materials were refined as a fine art framer. Todos Santos chocolates are Valrhona-based, though fine packaged chocolates such as Knipschildt and Michel Cluizel originating elsewhere are also sold. The store also offers its own truffles "in flavors like black pepper, burn caramel, and red chile-tangerine", enclosed in "ornate" and "colorful" packaging.
