= EET Nᵒ7 Taller Regional Quilmes =

Escuela de Educacion T Taller Regional Quilmes
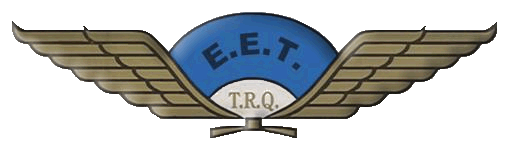

Location
- Av. Otamendi y Juan B. Justo; Quilmes, Buenos Aires (Argentina); 34°42′33.64″S 58°14′5.45″W

Information
- School type: Secondary School, Technical
- Motto: Identity, mastery, progress, action
- Established: 1957
- Administrator: Cecilia Filardi
- Principal: Prof. Jorge Pablo Juares
- Staff: ~100
- Grades: 7-13
- Enrollment: 1050
- Education system: Technical
- Language: Spanish
- Colors: Blue, gold and white
- Nickname: IMPA
- Degrees: Avionics Technician, Aeronautic Technician
- Foreign languages: English and German
- Website: www.impatrq.com
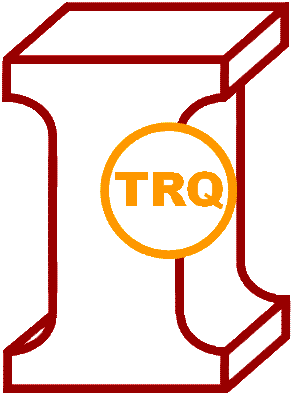

The Escuela de Educación Técnica Nº7 (EET Nº7), (also called IMPA), is a high school institution in Quilmes City, Buenos Aires, Argentina. It is directly administered by the Dirección General de Escuelas y Educación and the Argentine Air Force and located in the Area Material Quilmes.

== IMPA ==
Before the Area Material Quilmes was established in the place where now there was not an industrial facility called "IMPA" which was short for "Plastic Metalworkers Argentinas". When the school was founded in 1957, there was a tower within Quilmes, which had the IMPA logo painted on it; this tower is visible from the Avenue Otamendi. Then the tower was painted, although the slogan IMPA remained visible from despite painting. Finally the front of the tower was cut off and removed the IMPA slogan for this school and it earned the nickname "IMPA", in reference to that company. Later, the school adopted the theme and the fact that his motto in the Spanish acronym "Progress Action Master Identity".

== History of the college ==
The school began operations in March 1957, first under the jurisdiction of the Regional Workshop Quilmes. The school's mission was to educate apprentices for the workshops of aircraft operators. On April 25, 1962, Quilmes Regional Workshop and the National Council of Technical Education agreed and the school officially began operating as a secondary school under the name of the National Technical Education School No. 4 "Taller de Quilmes regional" using the facilities and assets provided by the Argentinian Air Force. Since 1971, the electronics technician degree has been offered at the school, and it graduated its first class of electronics technicians in 1973. The title of Technical Aviation has been offered since 1973, and it graduated its first class of aeronautical technicians in 1975. After the 1999 reforms of secondary schools in Buenos Aires, the electronics technician degree was replaced by the qualification of avionics technician. The school was renamed the School of Technical Education No. 7 "Taller Regional Quilmes"

== Academic life ==
To become a student at this institution, one must take an entrance exam. Mathematics and Spanish are the subjects tested in the exam. Over five hundred students apply every year, but only around the best 150 results can enter the school's first year.

Classes begin at 7:30 and end at 15:30 (1st, 2nd and 3rd year) or at 17:30 (4th through 7th year). In the fourth year, one has to choose what specialization to study for the next 4 years, either Aeronautical Technician or Avionics Technician.

School year	School level	Title	US year equivalent	US level equivalent
1st year	Basic cycle	-	7th	Middle school
2nd year	Basic cycle	-	8th	Middle school
3rd year	Basic cycle	-	9th (freshmen)	High school
4th year	Technician	-	10th (sophomore)	High school
5th year	Technician	-	11th (junior)	High school
6th year	Technician	Secondary School degree	12th (senior)	High school
7th Year	Technician	Avionics/aeronautics technician	-	-

== Facilities ==
The school has two hangars with seven planes and two helicopters, along with engines, landing gears, etc. There is an avionics laboratory, a pneumatics lab, a hydraulics lab and a digital electronics lab.

The school has a dining room and a cafeteria.

The school has a rugby and soccer field, together with a shot put field, javelin throw field, long jump field, high jump equipment, and a running track.

== Regulations ==
- To pass a test, students need 7 out of 10 points.
- Students can only be absent 28 days.

== School administration ==
The day-to-day administration of the school is headed by the principal, Prof. Jorge Pablo Juares. There is also a symbolic headmaster, who is an officer in the Argentinian Air Force, Comodoro Roberto E. Olgiati.

School Principals since the accreditation from the Consejo Nacional de Educación Técnica (April 25, 1962):

- 25 April 1962 to 22 August 1969: Prof. Agustín Mario Jatib
- 28 August 1969 to 10 March 1986: Ambrioso Enrique Pariani
- 10 March 1986 to 19 April 1990: Cesar Santiago Valentini
- 19 April 1990 to 2014: Prof. Hugo Cesar Jorge Alori
- 27 September 2014 to present: Prof. Jorge Pablo Juares

== See also ==
- Argentinean Air Force
- Secondary Schools in Argentin
- IMPA Tu-Sa
