= Villa Ballester =

City in Buenos Aires Province, Argentina

- City
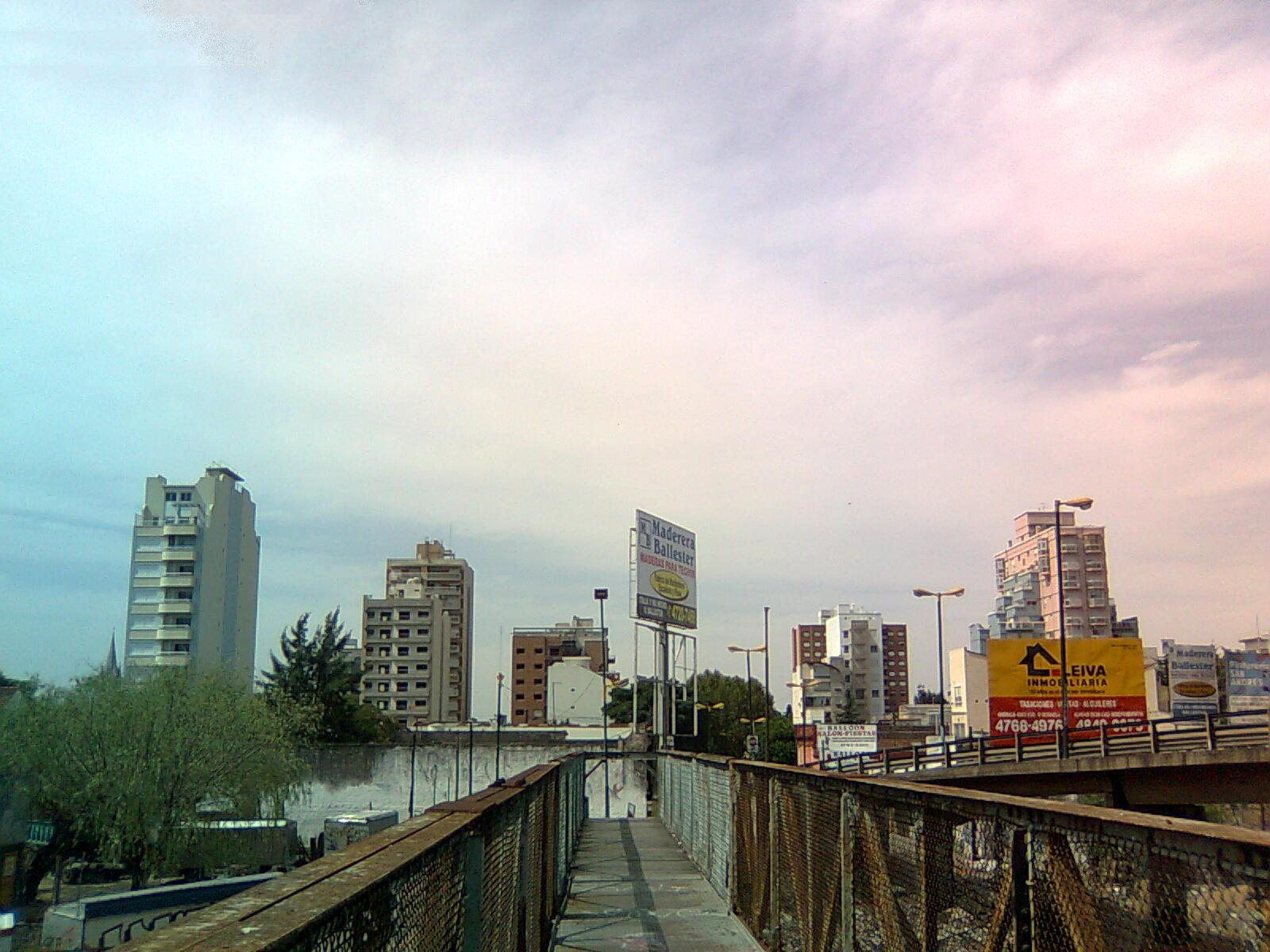
- Villa Ballester (east side)

- Location in Greater Buenos Aires
- Coordinates: 34°31′S 58°32′W
- Country: Argentina
- Province: Buenos Aires
- Partido: San Martín
- Founded: 26 October 1889
- Elevation: 26 m (85 ft)

Population (2001 census [INDEC])
  - Total: 35,301
- CPA Base: B 1653
- Area code: +54 11
- Website: http://www.sanmartin.gov.ar

Villa Ballester is a city located in the northern Greater Buenos Aires urban area and it is part of the General San Martín Partido in Buenos Aires Province, Argentina. It is served by the Línea Mitre commuter railway with its station also named Villa Ballester. Founded on 26 October 1889.

== History ==
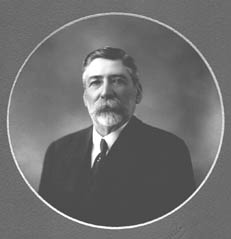
Pedro Ballester

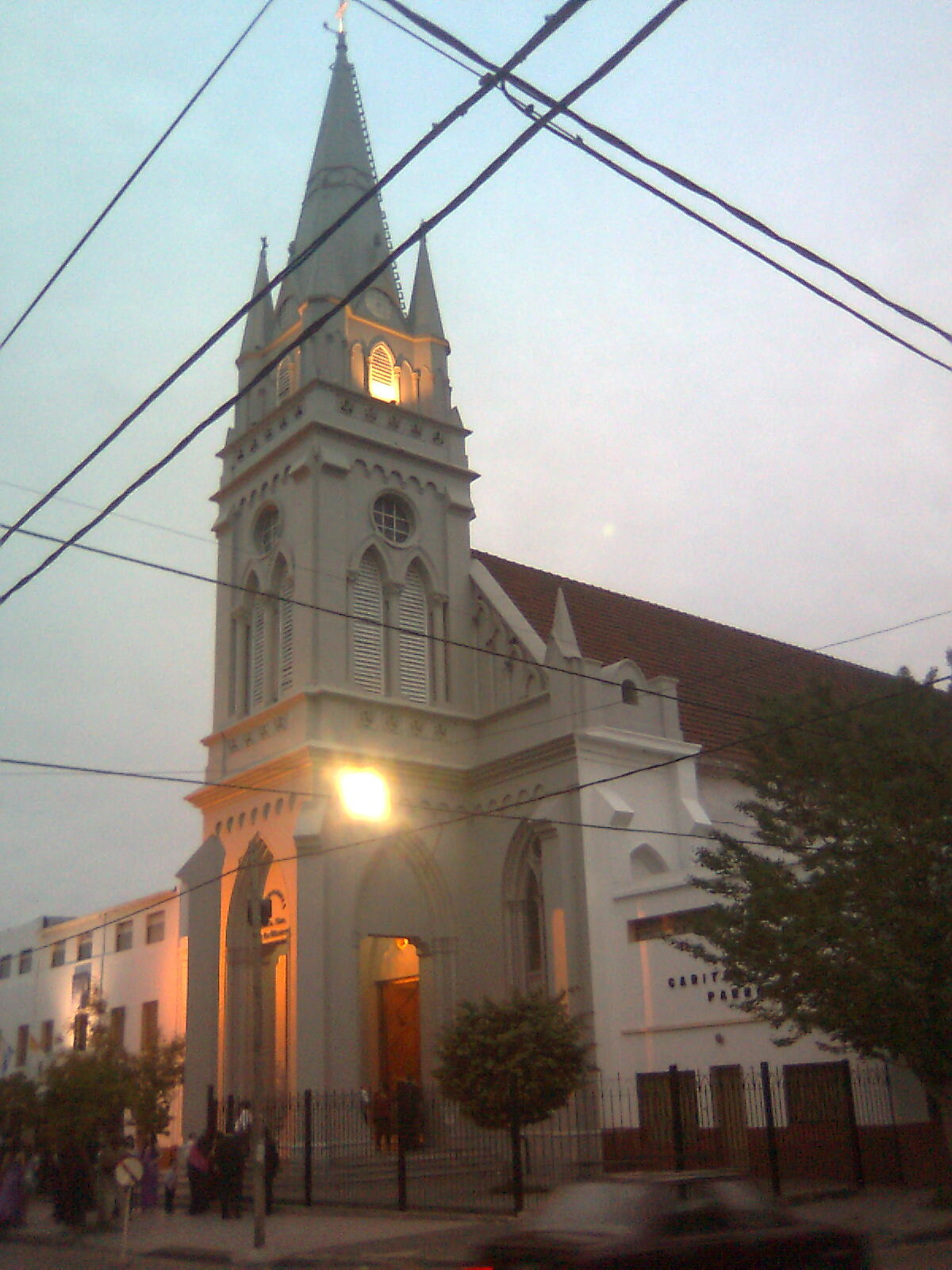
Nuestra Señora de La Merced Church

Pedro Ballester (4 December 1849 – 5 September 1928) started the development of the town in the late 1880s in some fields occupied by his family, the chacra Miguel Ballester y Flotat. A key factor for the success of the new town was the train which provided fast access to Buenos Aires. The town was named after the commercial partnership between Pedro Ballester and Guillermo Lacroze, "Sociedad Villa Ballester".

== Education ==
Hölters Schule, a German school, is in Villa Ballester. It was once recognized as a German school by the West German government.

== Sports ==
The city received international attention as one of the host cities of the 1990 FIBA World Championship.

== Notable people ==
- Juliana Awada (born 1974), First Lady of Argentina
- Alejandro Awada (born 1961), actor
- Annemarie Heinrich (1912–2005), German-born photographer
- Carlos Ripamonte (1874–1968), painter
- Fernando Siro (1931–2006), film actor, film director and screenwriter
- Helmut Ditsch (born 1962), painter
- José Carreras (born 1946), Spanish tenor, lived in Villa Ballester for a year during his childhood
- José Hernández (1834–1886), journalist and poet, born at the Pueyrredón Chacra on 10 November 1834
- Luis César Amadori (1920–1977), film director, married to Zully Moreno
- Roberto De Vicenzo (1923–2017), former professional golfer and The Open Championship winner
