= Belfast Victoria (Northern Ireland Parliament constituency) =

Constituency of the Parliament of Northern Ireland

Coordinates: 54.598°N 5.872°W

- Former Borough constituency for the Parliament of Northern Ireland
- Belfast Victoria shown within Belfast and Belfast shown within Northern Ireland

Former constituency
- Created: 1929
- Abolished: 1973
- Election method: First past the post

Belfast Victoria was a constituency of the Parliament of Northern Ireland.

== Boundaries ==
Belfast Victoria was a borough constituency comprising part of eastern Belfast. It was created in 1929, when the House of Commons (Method of Voting and Redistribution of Seats) Act (Northern Ireland) 1929 introduced first-past-the-post elections throughout Northern Ireland.

Belfast Victoria was created by the division of Belfast East into four new constituencies. It survived unchanged, returning one member of Parliament, until the Parliament of Northern Ireland was temporarily suspended in 1972, and then formally abolished in 1973.

The seat contained the eastern parts of the former Victoria ward. It covered an area equivalent to the current wards of Sydenham, Belmont and Ballyhackamore together with parts of the Island and Stormont wards.

== Politics ==
The seat was held in the early years by Ulster Unionist Party candidates. However, there was always strong support for labour movement candidates, with David Bleakley holding the seat for seven years.

== Members of Parliament ==
Election	Member	Party
1929	Sir Dawson Bates	Ulster Unionist Party
1933	Sir Dawson Bates	Ulster Unionist Party
1938	Sir Dawson Bates	Ulster Unionist Party
1945	Robert Alexander	Ulster Unionist Party
1949	Robert Alexander	Ulster Unionist Party
1953	Bill Henderson	Ulster Unionist Party
1958	David Bleakley	Northern Ireland Labour Party
1962	David Bleakley	Northern Ireland Labour Party
1965	Roy Bradford	Ulster Unionist Party^{†}
1969	Roy Bradford	Ulster Unionist Party^{†}
1973	Constituency abolished	

^{†}Bradford was elected in 1969 as an "O'Neill Unionist" supporting the reform proposals of the then Prime Minister.

== Election results ==
General Election 22 May 1929: Belfast Victoria
Party	Candidate	Votes	%	±%
UUP	Dawson Bates	6,046	61.0	
Local Option	James Price	3,858	39.0	
Majority		2,180	22.0	
Turnout		14,251	69.5	
UUP win (new seat)				

General Election 30 November 1933: Belfast Victoria
Party	Candidate	Votes	%	±%
UUP	Dawson Bates	Unopposed	N/A	N/A
UUP hold		Swing	N/A	

General Election 9 February 1938: Belfast Victoria
Party	Candidate	Votes	%	±%
UUP	Dawson Bates	8,309	59.3	N/A
Progressive Unionist	Joseph McMaster	3,434	24.5	New
NI Labour	Tom Boyd	2,268	16.2	New
Majority		4,875	34.8	N/A
Turnout		17,921	78.2	N/A
UUP hold		Swing	N/A	

General Election 22 October 1945: Belfast Victoria
Party	Candidate	Votes	%	±%
UUP	Robert Alexander (Northern Ireland politician)	7,618	54.1	+0.8
NI Labour	George Matthews	4,342	30.8	+14.6
Commonwealth Labour	Norman Black	2,133	15.1	N/A
Majority		3,276	23.3	−11.5
Turnout		18,525	76.1	−2.1
UUP hold		Swing		

General Election 10 February 1949: Belfast Victoria
Party	Candidate	Votes	%	±%
UUP	Robert Alexander (Northern Ireland politician)	11,330	82.4	+28.3
NI Labour	David Bleakley	2,423	17.6	−13.2
Majority		8,907	64.8	+41.5
Turnout		18,404	74.7	−1.4
UUP hold		Swing		

General Election 14 June 1953: Belfast Victoria
Party	Candidate	Votes	%	±%
UUP	Bill Henderson	7,198	56.5	−25.9
NI Labour	David Bleakley	5,536	43.5	+25.9
Majority		1,662	13.0	−51.8
Turnout		20,041	63.5	−1.2
UUP hold		Swing		

General Election 20 March 1958: Belfast Victoria
Party	Candidate	Votes	%	±%
NI Labour	David Bleakley	7,487	50.5	+7.0
UUP	Bill Henderson	7,340	49.5	−7.0
Majority		147	1.0	N/A
Turnout		19,652	75.4	+11.9
NI Labour gain from UUP		Swing		

General Election 31 May 1962: Belfast Victoria
Party	Candidate	Votes	%	±%
NI Labour	David Bleakley	7,882	54.2	+3.7
UUP	Leslie Stewart	6,668	45.8	−3.7
Majority		1,214	8.4	+7.4
Turnout		20,053	72.6	−2.8
NI Labour hold		Swing		

General Election 25 November 1965: Belfast Victoria
Party	Candidate	Votes	%	±%
UUP	Roy Bradford	6,892	51.6	+5.8
NI Labour	David Bleakley	6,469	48.4	−5.8
Majority		423	3.2	N/A
Turnout		20,370	65.6	−7.0
UUP gain from NI Labour		Swing		

General Election 24 February 1969: Belfast Victoria
Party	Candidate	Votes	%	±%
UUP	Roy Bradford	9,249	62.9	+11.3
NI Labour	John Coulthard	2,972	20.2	−28.2
Protestant Unionist	Ronald Bunting	2,489	16.9	New
Majority		6,277	42.7	+39.5
Turnout		19,504	75.4	+9.8
UUP hold		Swing		
