= Belfast East (Northern Ireland Parliament constituency) =

Coordinates: 54.604°N 5.876°W

- Former borough constituency for the Parliament of Northern Ireland
- Belfast East shown within Northern Ireland

Former constituency
- Created: 1921
- Abolished: 1929
- Replaced by: Belfast Bloomfield; Belfast Dock; Belfast Pottinger; Belfast Victoria
- Election method: Single transferable vote

Belfast East was a borough constituency of the Parliament of Northern Ireland from 1921 to 1929. It returned four MPs, using proportional representation by means of the single transferable vote.

== History and boundaries ==
Belfast East was created by the Government of Ireland Act 1920 and contained the Dock, Pottinger and Victoria wards of the County Borough of Belfast.

In May 1921, Dáil Éireann, the parliament of the self-declared Irish Republic run by Sinn Féin, passed a resolution declaring that elections to the House of Commons of Northern Ireland and the House of Commons of Southern Ireland would be used as the election for the Second Dáil. All those elected were on the roll of the Second Dáil, but as no Sinn Féin MP was elected for Belfast East, it was not represented there.

The House of Commons (Method of Voting and Redistribution of Seats) Act (Northern Ireland) 1929 divided the constituency into four constituencies elected under first past the post: Belfast Bloomfield, Belfast Dock, Belfast Pottinger and Belfast Victoria constituencies.

== Politics ==
Belfast East was a predominantly Unionist area with some pockets of labour strength, returning four Unionists in 1921 and 2 Unionists, 1 Independent Unionist and a Northern Ireland Labour Party MP in 1925.

== Members of Parliament ==
| Election | Member (Party) | Member (Party) | Member (Party) | Member (Party) |
|---|---|---|---|---|
| MPs (1921) | Dawson Bates (Ulster Unionist Party) | Herbert Dixon (Ulster Unionist Party) | Thompson Donald (Ulster Unionist Party) | James Augustine Duff (Ulster Unionist Party) |
| MPs (1925) | Dawson Bates (Ulster Unionist Party) | Herbert Dixon (Ulster Unionist Party) | Jack Beattie (Northern Ireland Labour Party) | James Woods Gyle (Independent Unionist) |

== Election results ==
24 May 1921 General Election: Belfast East (4 seats)
| Party | Candidate | FPv% | Count | | | |
| Party | Candidate | FPv% | 1 | 2 | 3 | 4 |
|---|---|---|---|---|---|---|
| UUP | Sir Dawson Bates | 27.9 | 10,026 | | | |
| UUP | Herbert Dixon | 24.6 | 8,849 | | | |
| UUP | Thompson Donald | 19.1 | 6,856 | 9,262 | | |
| UUP | James Augustine Duff | 10.0 | 3,585 | 3,956 | 6,027 | 7,662 |
| Sinn Féin | Archibald Savage | 10.0 | 3,573 | 3,575 | 3,576 | 3,577 |
| Nationalist | Thomas Joseph Campbell | 6.6 | 2,373 | 2,435 | 2,439 | 2,464 |
| Belfast Labour | Harry Midgley | 1.8 | 645 | 648 | 652 | 658 |
Electorate: 40,198 Valid: 35,907 Quota: 7,182 Turnout: 89.3%

1925 General Election: Belfast East (4 seats)
| Party | Candidate | FPv% | Count | | |
| Party | Candidate | FPv% | 1 | 2 | 3 |
|---|---|---|---|---|---|
| NI Labour | Jack Beattie | 28.6 | 9,330 | | |
| UUP | Herbert Dixon | 26.1 | 8,508 | | |
| Ind. Unionist | James Woods Gyle | 18.4 | 5,997 | 8,394 | |
| UUP | Sir Dawson Bates | 17.6 | 5,744 | 5,816 | 6,581 |
| UUP | Thompson Donald | 5.8 | 1,900 | 2,119 | 2,898 |
| UUP | James Augustine Duff | 3.5 | 1,142 | 1,259 | 1,698 |
Electorate: 44,400 Valid: 32,621 Quota: 6,525 Turnout: 73.5%
