= Colegio de Todos Los Santos =

Coordinates: 34.5037°S 58.5483°W

Information
- Established: 1981; 45 years ago
- Language: English and Spanish
- Website: www.tls.edu.ar

Colegio de Todos Los Santos is a private school in Argentina. It was founded in 1981 and has been an International Baccalaureate World School since 1988. Its classes are being taught in English and Spanish.
