= Hölters Schule =

Location
- Independencia 5886; Villa Ballester, San Martín, Buenos Aires Province; Argentina
- Coordinates: 34.5431°S 58.5642°W

Information
- Type: Private
- Established: 1931
- Founder: Hermann Hölters
- Administrator: Mr. Walter Brandauer
- Website: http://www.hoelters.edu.ar

The Hölters Institute (or Hölters Schule) is a school which integrates high school, elementary school and kindergarten. It is located in the city of Villa Ballester, in Buenos Aires Province, Argentina.

It was established in 1931 by Hermann Hölters, a German educator, and, German is taught since kindergarten.

It was once recognized as a German school by the West German government.

== See also ==
- German Argentine
