= Ballydown, County Antrim =

Coordinates: 54°50′04″N 5°45′55″W

Ballydown, County Antrim: Irish: Baile an Dún
- Location within Northern Ireland
- County: County Antrim
- Country: Northern Ireland
- Sovereign state: United Kingdom
- Post town: LARNE
- Postcode district: BT40
- Dialling code: 028

Ballydown (from Irish Baile an Dún, meaning 'town of the fort') is a townland of 210 acres in County Antrim, Northern Ireland. It is situated in the civil parish of Islandmagee and the historic barony of Belfast Lower.

== Archaeology ==
The townland contains a mound (at grid ref: D4364 0061) which is a Scheduled Historic Monument.

== See also ==
- List of townlands in County Antrim
