= Colegio Nacional de Ushuaia =

Coordinates: 54.8°S 68.279°W

Information
- Established: March 1994; 31 years ago
- Affiliation: Colegio Nacional de Buenos Aires

Colegio Nacional de Ushuaia (National College of Ushuaia) is a college preparatory school sponsored by the prestigious Colegio Nacional de Buenos Aires in Argentina. Both provide a free, rigorous, multi-disciplinary education that includes classical languages. The Colegio Nacional de Ushuaia was established in March 1994 (31 years ago) as a response for the demand emerging from the growing population in Tierra del Fuego.
