= Brookeborough ministry =

Executive Committee of the Privy Council of Northern Ireland

The Brookeborough ministry was the third Government or Executive Committee of the Privy Council of Northern Ireland. It was led by Basil Brooke (Lord Brookeborough from 1952), who was Prime Minister from 1 May 1943 to 26 March 1963.

The Parliament of Northern Ireland was the home rule legislature created under the Government of Ireland Act 1920. It existed from 7 June 1921 to 30 March 1972, when it was suspended, and was subsequently abolished under the Northern Ireland Constitution Act 1973.

== Cabinet ==
Office	Member	Term
Prime Minister	Basil Brooke, 1st Viscount Brookeborough	1 May 1943 – 26 March 1963
Minister of Finance for Northern Ireland	Maynard Sinclair	6 May 1943 – 31 January 1953 (death)
Minister of Finance for Northern Ireland	Brian Maginess	from 13 February 1953
Minister of Finance for Northern Ireland	George Hanna	from 20 April 1956
Minister of Finance for Northern Ireland	Terence O'Neill	from 21 September 1956
Minister of Home Affairs for Northern Ireland	William Lowry	1943–1944
Minister of Home Affairs for Northern Ireland	Edmond Warnock	3 November 1944 – 1946
Minister of Home Affairs for Northern Ireland	Brian Maginess	4 November 1949 – April 1956
Minister of Home Affairs for Northern Ireland	John Edward Warnock	from 11 September 1946
Minister of Home Affairs for Northern Ireland	George Hanna	from 26 October 1953
Minister of Home Affairs for Northern Ireland	Terence O'Neill	from 20 April 1956
Minister of Home Affairs for Northern Ireland	Walter William Buchanan Topping	from 23 October 1956
Minister of Home Affairs for Northern Ireland	Brian Faulkner	from 15 December 1959
Minister of Education for Northern Ireland	Rev. Robert Corkey	1943–1944
Minister of Education for Northern Ireland	Samuel Hall-Thompson	1944–1950
Minister of Education for Northern Ireland	Harry Midgley	1950–29 April 1957 (death)
Minister of Education for Northern Ireland	William May	1957–1962
Minister of Education for Northern Ireland	Ivan Neill	12 March 1962 – 22 July 1964
Minister of Agriculture for Northern Ireland	Rev. Robert Moore	6 May 1943 – 1 September 1960 (death)
Minister of Agriculture for Northern Ireland	Harry West	from 1960
Minister of Labour for Northern Ireland	William Grant	1943–1944
Minister of Labour for Northern Ireland	Brian Maginess	from 2 August 1945
Minister of Labour for Northern Ireland	Harry Midgley	1949–1950
Minister of Labour for Northern Ireland	Ivan Neill	January 1950 – 1962
Minister of Labour for Northern Ireland	Herbert Kirk	from 1962
Minister of Commerce for Northern Ireland	Roland Nugent	16 February 1945 – 1949
Minister of Commerce for Northern Ireland	William McCleery	4 November 1949 – 1953
Minister of Commerce for Northern Ireland	Lord Glentoran	26 October 1953 – 1961
Minister of Commerce for Northern Ireland	Jack Andrews	17 October 1961– 1964
Minister of Health and Local Government for Northern Ireland (post created 1944)	William Grant	1 June 1944 – 15 August 1949 (death)
Minister of Health and Local Government for Northern Ireland (post created 1944)	Dehra Parker	26 August 1949 – 13 March 1957
Minister of Health and Local Government for Northern Ireland (post created 1944)	Jack Andrews	from 1957
Minister of Health and Local Government for Northern Ireland (post created 1944)	William Morgan	from 1961
