= Andrews ministry (Northern Ireland) =

Northern Irish home rule legislature

- 2nd Government of Northern Ireland
- Date formed: 25 November 1940
- Date dissolved: 31 April 1943

People and organisations
- Head of state: George VI
- Head of government: J. M. Andrews
- Deputy head of government: Vacant (1940–41); John Milne Barbour (1941–43)
- No. of ministers: 6
- Member party: UUP; NILP (from 1943)
- Status in legislature: Majority
- Opposition cabinet: N/A - Nationalist Party largely abstained from attending Stormont
- Opposition party: Nationalist Party
- Opposition leader: Thomas Joseph Campbell

History
- Legislature terms: 5th House of Commons
- Predecessor: Craigavon ministry
- Successor: Brookeborough ministry

The Parliament of Northern Ireland was the home rule legislature created under the Government of Ireland Act 1920, which existed from 7 June 1921 to 30 March 1972, when it was suspended. It was subsequently abolished under the Northern Ireland Constitution Act 1973.

The second Government or Executive Committee of the Privy Council of Northern Ireland was led by J. M. Andrews, who was Prime Minister from 25 November 1940 to 31 April 1943.

== Cabinet ==
Minister in the House of Commons	Minister in the Senate

Office	Member	Term
Prime Minister	J. M. Andrews	25 November 1940 – 31 April 1943
Minister of Finance for Northern Ireland	J. M. Barbour	16 January 1941 – 6 May 1943
Minister of Home Affairs for Northern Ireland	Richard Dawson-Bates	7 June 1921 – 6 May 1943
Minister of Education for Northern Ireland	J. H. Robb	1 December 1937 – 6 May 1943
Minister of Agriculture for Northern Ireland	Herbert Dixon, 1st Baron Glentoran	16 January 1941 – 6 May 1943
Minister of Labour for Northern Ireland	John Fawcett Gordon	29 August 1938 – 6 May 1943
Minister of Commerce for Northern Ireland	Basil Brooke	16 January 1941 – 16 February 1945
Minister of Public Security	John MacDermott	25 June 1940 – 10 November 1941
Minister of Public Security	William Grant	10 November 1941 – 6 May 1943
