= William Lyle =

William Lyle (30 March 1871 – 2 August 1949) was a Northern Irish medical doctor and Ulster Unionist Party politician. He sat in the House of Commons of Northern Ireland for a few years in his 70s.

== Career ==
Lyle was a graduate of Queen's University Belfast who became a medical Officer for Newtownstewart in County Tyrone. A member of Tyrone County Council, he stood as the Ulster Unionist candidate at a by-election on 19 October 1942 for the Queen's University of Belfast constituency, and was elected unopposed. He was sworn in on 27 October 1942.

On 15 December 1942, the Commons debated a motion proposed by Lyle for the creation of a dedicated Ministry of Health, in view of the sweeping changes needed to implement the recently published Beveridge Report. He used the debate to attack the Minister of Home Affairs, Dawson Bates, whose brief included health. Bates had held the office since the foundation of Northern Ireland 21 years earlier, but Northern Ireland had seen no new public health legislation since 1878. Lyle accused the minister of repeatedly setting up committees on public health issues, but then not acting on their reports.

Lyle's enthusiasm for public health measures did not extend to public housing. The Housing Act (Northern Ireland) 1945 established the Northern Ireland Housing Trust, which built some 48,500 homes between 1945 and 1971. During the November 1944 debates on the Housing (No. 2) Bill which later became the Act, Lyle both opposed the proposed centralisation and the emphasis on public housing, rather than private. He blamed it on the influence in government of Harry Midgley, the Minister of Labour. Midgley was a popular Belfast labour politician who had been brought into the Cabinet by Basil Brooke, but Lyle said of the 52-year-old Midgley:

"some of his views are abhorrent to me, especially this one of nationalisation. I hope that as he grows older, more mellow, more mature, and gets rather more commonsense than he has at present he will drop those obnoxious views".

Lyle was defeated at the 1945 general election. In the 4-seat single transferable vote constituency, he polled in sixth place less with than 10% of the first preference votes. However at the general election in February 1949, his slightly increased 11.2% of first preferences was enough to win him the fourth seat. He held that seat until his death 6 months later, on 2 August 1949, at the age of 78.

== Sources ==
- Walker, Brian M. (1992). Parliamentary Election Results in Ireland 1918–92. Royal Irish Academy. ISBN 0-901714-96-8.
- Melaugh, Martin. "Section 2: Housing Policy and Public Reaction 1945 To 1971". Majority Minority Review 3: Housing and Religion in Northern Ireland. CAIN Web site. Archived from the original on 20 July 2017.

Parliament of Northern Ireland
Preceded by Arthur Brownlow Mitchell; Howard Stevenson; John MacDermott; Robert Corkey	Member of Parliament for Queen's University of Belfast; 1942–1945; With: Robert Corkey to 1943; John MacDermott to 1944; Howard Stevenson to 1949; John W. Renshaw 1943–1945; Herbert Quin from 1944	Succeeded by Irene Calvert; Frederick McSorley; Herbert Quin; Howard Stevenson
Preceded by Herbert Quin; Howard Stevenson; Samuel Irwin; John W. Renshaw	Member of Parliament for Queen's University of Belfast; February 1949 – August 1949; With: Irene Calvert; Eileen M. Hickey; Samuel Irwin	Succeeded by Frederick Lloyd-Dodd; Irene Calvert; Eileen M. Hickey; Samuel Irwin
