= Head of the Northern Ireland Civil Service =

Northern Ireland Civil Service

There has been a Head of the Northern Ireland Civil Service (NICS) since Sir Ernest Clark was appointed the first holder of that office in 1921. As of 2017 and according to the Executive Office, the Head of the 23,500-people strong NICS "has primary leadership responsibility for creating, developing and sustaining the NICS as an organisation which serves the devolved administration, the institutions of government and the people of Northern Ireland through the provision of high quality, cost effective services." The incumbent is also Permanent Secretary of the Executive Office and Secretary to the Northern Ireland Executive, making the office-holder the "most senior adviser to the First Minister and the deputy First Minister".

== List of Heads of the Northern Ireland Civil Service ==
- 1921–1925: Sir Ernest Clark
- 1925–1944: Lt-Col. Sir Wilfred Spender
- 1944–1953: Sir William Dalgliesh Scott
- 1953–1961: Sir Douglas Alexander Earsman Harkness
- 1961–1965: Sir Richard Frederick Roberts Dunbar
- 1965–1970: Sir Cecil Joseph Bateman
- 1970–1976: Sir David Charles Beresford Holden
- 1976–1979: Sir Robert Hill Kidd
- 1979–1984: Sir Ewart Bell
- 1984–1991: Sir Kenneth Bloomfield
- 1991–1997: Sir David Fell
- 1997–2000: Sir John Semple
- 2000–2002: Sir Gerry Loughran
- 2002–2008: Sir Nigel Hamilton
- 2008-2011: Sir Bruce Robinson
- 2011–2017: Sir Malcolm McKibbin
- 2017–2020: Sir David Sterling
- December 2020 – 2021: Jenny Pyper (interim head)
- September 2021 – present: Jayne Brady

== See also ==
- Civil service
- Northern Ireland Executive
- Northern Ireland Civil Service
- Permanent Secretary of the Welsh Government
- Permanent Secretary to the Scottish Government
- Cabinet Secretary (United Kingdom)
- Secretary-General to the President (Ireland)
