= Craigavon ministry =

- 1st Government of Northern Ireland

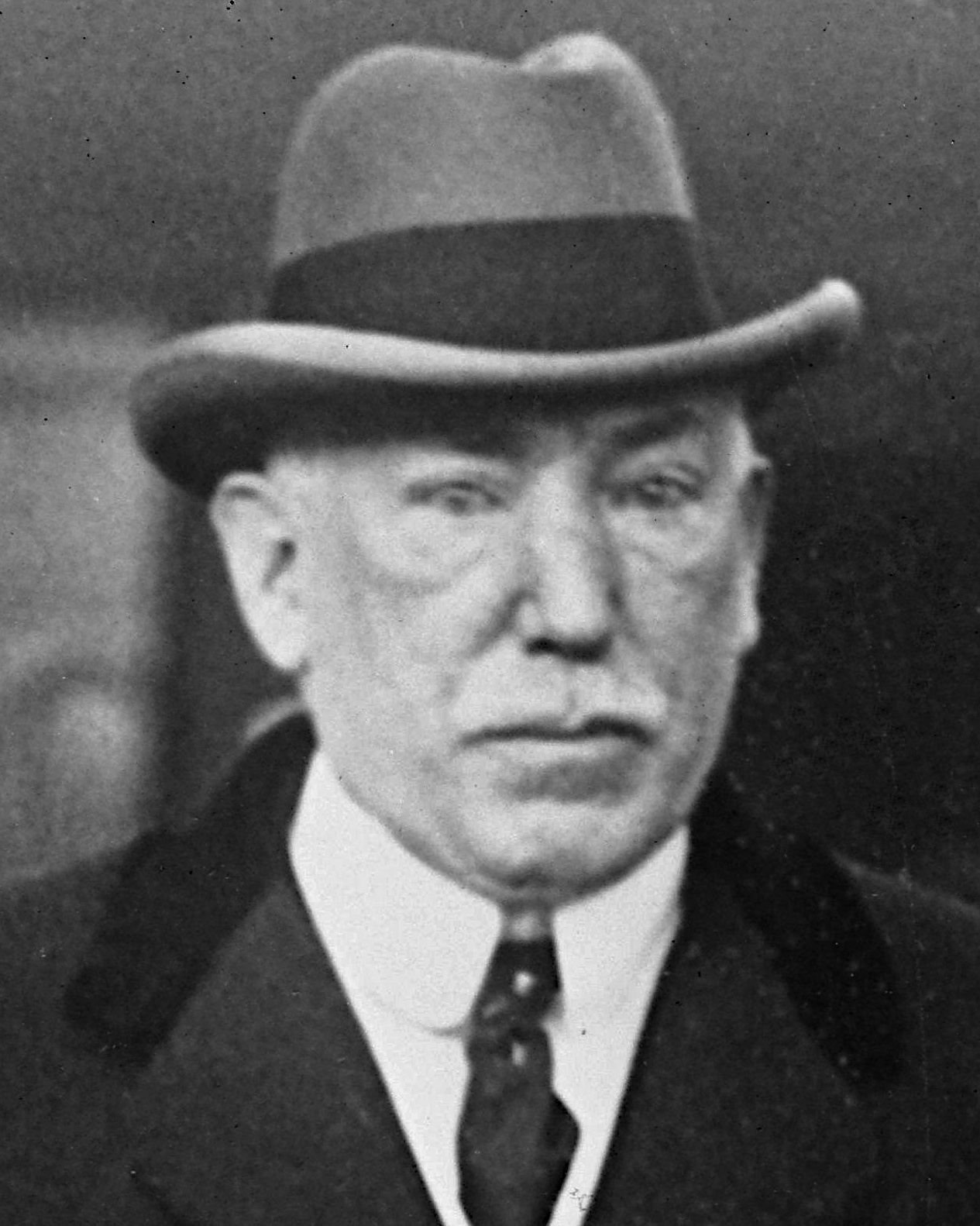
- Date formed: 7 June 1921
- Date dissolved: 24 November 1940

People and organisations
- Head of state: George V (1921–Jan. 36); Edward VIII (Jan.–Dec. 1936); George VI (Dec.1936–40)
- Head of government: James Craig
- Deputy head of government: Hugh Pollock (1921–37); John Millar Andrews (1937–40)
- No. of ministers: 5 (1921–25); 6 (1925–40)
- Member party: UUP
- Status in legislature: Majority Government

History
- Elections: 1921, 1925, 1929, 1933, 1938
- Legislature terms: 1st, 2nd, 3rd, 4th, 5th House of Commons
- Successor: Andrews ministry

The Parliament of Northern Ireland was the home rule legislature created under the Government of Ireland Act 1920, which existed from 7 June 1921 to 30 March 1972, when it was suspended. It was subsequently abolished under the Northern Ireland Constitution Act 1973.

The first Government or Executive Committee of the Privy Council of Northern Ireland was led by James Craig (Lord Craigavon from 1927), who was Prime Minister between 7 June 1921 and 24 November 1940.

== Cabinet ==
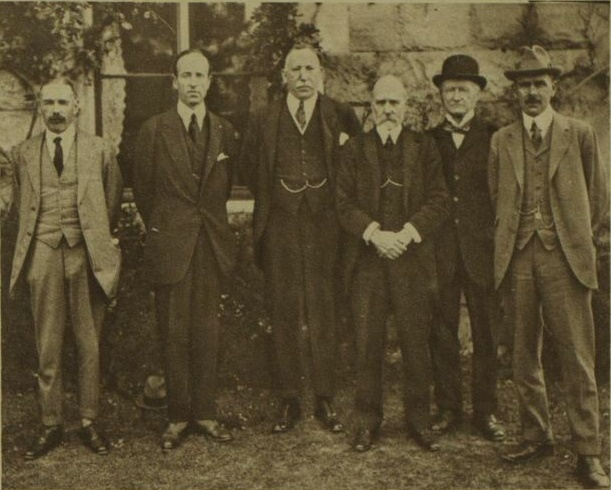
The Cabinet in 1921. From left to right, Bates, Londonderry, Craig, Pollock, Archdale and Andrews

| Office | Member | Term |
|---|---|---|
| Prime Minister | James Craig | 7 June 1921 – 24 November 1940 |
| Minister of Finance for Northern Ireland | Hugh Pollock | from 7 June 1921 |
| Minister of Finance for Northern Ireland | John Millar Andrews | from 21 April 1937 |
| Minister of Home Affairs for Northern Ireland | Richard Dawson-Bates | from 7 June 1921 |
| Minister of Education for Northern Ireland | Marquess of Londonderry | from 7 June 1921 |
| Minister of Education for Northern Ireland | James Caulfeild, 8th Viscount Charlemont | from 8 January 1926 – 13 October 1937 |
| Minister of Education for Northern Ireland | J. H. Robb | from 1 December 1937 |
| Minister of Agriculture for Northern Ireland | Edward Archdale | from 7 June 1921 |
| Minister of Agriculture for Northern Ireland | Basil Brooke | from 1 December 1933 |
| Minister of Labour for Northern Ireland | John Millar Andrews | from 7 June 1921 |
| Minister of Labour for Northern Ireland | D. G. Shillington | from 21 April 1937 |
| Minister of Labour for Northern Ireland | J. F. Gordon | from 29 August 1938 |
| Minister of Commerce for Northern Ireland | Milne Barbour | from 16 June 1925, when the post was created |
| Attorney General for Northern Ireland | Sir Anthony Babington | from 5 November 1925 |
