= Kenneth Bloomfield =

Northern Irish civil servant (1931–2025)

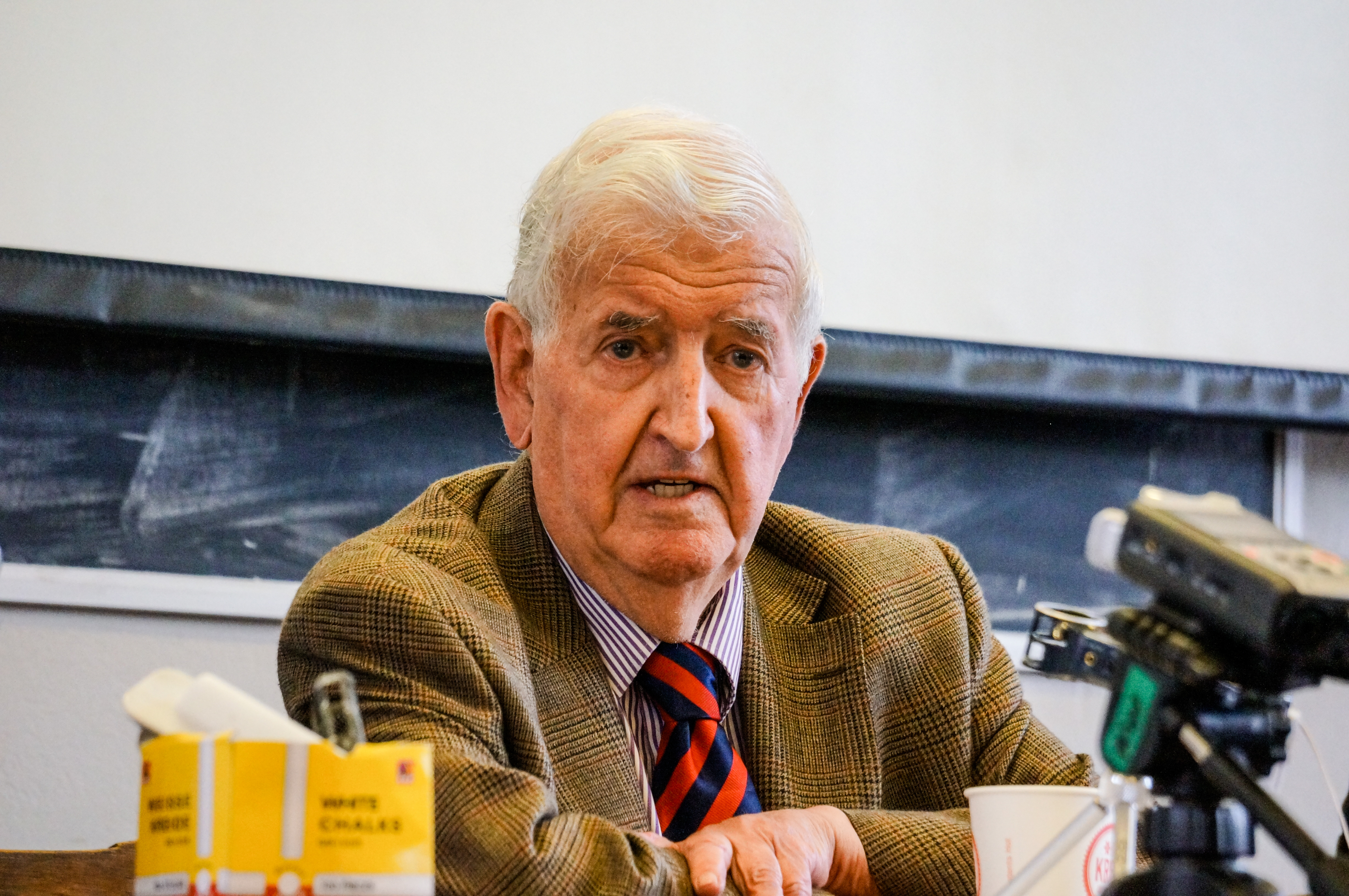
Ken Bloomfield

Sir Kenneth Percy Bloomfield, KCB (15 April 1931 – 30 May 2025) was a Northern Irish civil servant who was Head of the Northern Ireland Civil Service (NICS) and was later a member of the Independent Commission for the Location of Victims' Remains. For a time, he was also Northern Ireland Victims Commissioner.

== Background ==
Kenneth Percy Bloomfield was born in Belfast, Northern Ireland, to English parents on 15 April 1931. He grew up close to Neill's Hill railway station, East Belfast. Between 1943 and 1949, he attended the Royal Belfast Academical Institution ('Inst') and later went on to read Modern History at St Peter's College, Oxford. He was married with two children. On 12 September 1988, Bloomfield, his wife and son were the targets of an IRA attack on their home in Crawfordsburn, County Down; neither Bloomfield or his wife and son were physically injured in the blast.

Bloomfield died on 30 May 2025, at the age of 94.

== Public sector career ==
Having joined the Civil Service in 1952, Bloomfield was appointed Permanent Secretary to the power sharing executive in 1974. After the collapse of the executive, he went on to become Permanent Secretary for the Department of the Environment (D.o.E.) and the Department of Economic Development, and finally Head of the Northern Ireland Civil Service on 1 December 1984. In that capacity, he was the most senior advisor to successive Secretaries of State for Northern Ireland and other Ministers on a wide range of issues. He retired from the post in April 1991.

After retiring from the NICS, Bloomfield embarked on a life of involvement in a diverse range of organisations. He took up roles such as Chairman for the Northern Ireland Legal Services Commission and his alma mater, the Royal Belfast Academical Institution. He was also involved in the political reform of the States of Jersey and spearheaded the Association for Quality Education, which fought to retain academic selection in the Northern Ireland education system. In December 1997 he was asked by the then Secretary of State for Northern Ireland, Mo Mowlam, to become the Northern Ireland Victims Commissioner for a fixed term. His role was to produce a report on the way forward for Victims' issues in Northern Ireland. His report entitled We Will Remember Them was published in April 1998. From 1991 to 1999, he served as the BBC's National Governor for Northern Ireland.

== Honours ==
Bloomfield received a Knighthood in the 1987 Queen's Birthday Honours and has received honorary doctorates from The Queen's University of Belfast, The Open University and the University of Ulster. He was also a Member of the Royal Irish Academy (RIA).

== Works ==
- A New Life (2008)
- A Tragedy of Errors (2007)
- We will remember them (1998)
- Stormont in Crisis, a memoir (1994)
- "The BBC at the Watershed" (2008)

== See also ==
- Northern Ireland Civil Service
- Royal Belfast Academical Institution
