= John Semple (civil servant) =

Sir John Laughlin Semple, KCB (born 10 August 1940) is a retired civil servant who was Head of the Northern Ireland Civil Service between 1997 and 2000.

== Career ==
Semple was born on 10 August 1940, the son of James and Violet Semple. He attended Campbell College, Belfast, before studying at Corpus Christi College, Cambridge, graduating with a Bachelor of Arts degree. He subsequently earned a BSc Economics from the University of London.

Semple joined the Home Civil Service as an Assistant Principal at the Ministry of Aviation in 1961. He moved to the Northern Ireland Civil Service the next year. In 1965, he became Deputy Principal of the Northern Ireland Ministry of Health and Social Services, and three years later became Principal at the Ministry of Finance.

He held the same position at the Northern Ireland Ministry of Community Relations from 1970 to 1972, then served for five years as Assistant Secretary at the Northern Ireland Ministry of Development, before moving to the Department of the Environment. He was Under Secretary for Housing at the Department from 1979 to 1983, then Under Secretary (1983–88) and then Permanent Secretary (1988–97) at the Department of Finance and Personnel.

He became Head of the Northern Ireland Civil Service in 1997 and retired in 2000, when he was appointed Knight Commander of the Order of the Bath (having been appointed Companion in 1993). He was Second Permanent Under-Secretary of State at the United Kingdom's Northern Ireland Office for the year 1998–99, and was Secretary to the Executive Committee of the Northern Ireland Assembly the following year.
