= Chichester-Clark ministry =

Government of Northern Ireland, 1969–1971

The Parliament of Northern Ireland was the home rule legislature created under the Government of Ireland Act 1920, which existed from 7 June 1921 to 30 March 1972, when it was suspended. It was subsequently abolished under the Northern Ireland Constitution Act 1973.

The fifth Government or Executive Committee of the Privy Council of Northern Ireland was led by James Chichester-Clark, who was the Prime Minister from 1 May 1969 to 23 March 1971.

== Cabinet ==
Office	Member	Term
Prime Minister	James Chichester-Clark	from 1 May 1969
Deputy Prime Minister and Leader of the Senate of Northern Ireland	Jack Andrews	from 3 May 1969
Minister of Finance	Herbert Kirk	from 2 April 1965
Minister of Home Affairs	Robert Porter	from 12 March 1969; Office combined with Prime Minister from 26 August 1970
Minister of State, Ministry of Home Affairs (Cabinet rank)	John D Taylor	from 26 August 1970
Minister of Education	William Long	from 3 May 1969
Minister of Agriculture	Phelim O'Neill	from 3 May 1969
Minister of Commerce	Roy Bradford	from 24 January 1969
Minister of Health and Local Government	William Fitzsimmons	from 12 March 1969
Minister of Development	Brian Faulkner	from 3 May 1969
