= Belfast Willowfield (Northern Ireland Parliament constituency) =

Constituency of the Parliament of Northern Ireland

Coordinates: 54.587°N 5.899°W

- Former Borough constituency for the Parliament of Northern Ireland
- Belfast shown within Northern Ireland

Former constituency
- Created: 1929
- Abolished: 1973
- Election method: First past the post

Belfast Willowfield was a constituency of the Parliament of Northern Ireland.

== Boundaries ==
Belfast Willowfield was a borough constituency comprising part of southern Belfast. It was created in 1929 when the House of Commons (Method of Voting and Redistribution of Seats) Act (Northern Ireland) 1929 introduced first past the post elections throughout Northern Ireland.

Belfast Willowfield was created by the division of Belfast South into four new constituencies. It survived unchanged, returning one member of Parliament, until the Parliament of Northern Ireland was temporarily suspended in 1972, and then formally abolished in 1973.

== Politics ==
In common with other seats in south Belfast, the constituency was strongly unionist. The seat was generally held by Unionist candidates, although labour movement candidates often performed well and sometimes took the seat.

== Members of Parliament ==
Election	Member	Party
1929	Arthur Black	Ulster Unionist
1941(b)	Harry Midgley	Northern Ireland Labour Party
1941	Harry Midgley	Commonwealth Labour Party
1947	Harry Midgley	Ulster Unionist
1958	William Hinds	Ulster Unionist
1969	Tom Caldwell	Independent Unionist
1973	constituency abolished	

== Election results ==
General Election 1929: Belfast Willowfield
Party	Candidate	Votes	%	±%
UUP	Arthur Black	4,691	53.9	
Town Tenants' Association	Alexander McConnell	4,015	46.1	
Majority		676	7.8	
Turnout		8,706	69.4	
UUP win (new seat)				

At the 1933 Northern Ireland general election, Arthur Black was elected unopposed.

General Election 1938: Belfast Willowfield
Party	Candidate	Votes	%	±%
UUP	Arthur Black	7,615	65.1	N/A
Ulster Protestant League	Arthur Cleland	4,086	34.9	New
Majority		3,530	30.2	N/A
Turnout		11,701	74.1	N/A
UUP hold		Swing	N/A	

Belfast Willowfield by-election, 1941
Party	Candidate	Votes	%	±%
NI Labour	Harry Midgley	7,209	74.8	New
UUP	Fred Lavery	2,435	25.2	−39.9
Majority		4,774	49.6	N/A
Turnout		9,644	60.0	N/A
NI Labour gain from UUP		Swing		

General Election 1945: Belfast Willowfield
Party	Candidate	Votes	%	±%
Commonwealth Labour	Harry Midgley	7,072	55.9	N/A
UUP	George Irvine Finlay	4,488	35.5	−29.6
NI Labour	Robert McBrinn	1,082	8.6	N/A
Majority		2,584	20.4	N/A
Turnout		11,560	75.1	+1.0
Commonwealth Labour gain from UUP		Swing		

General Election 1949: Belfast Willowfield
Party	Candidate	Votes	%	±%
UUP	Harry Midgley	11,304	87.5	+52.0
NI Labour	William Leeburn	1,611	12.5	+3.9
Majority		9,693	75.0	N/A
Turnout		12,915	77.3	+2.2
UUP gain from Commonwealth Labour		Swing		

General Election 1953: Belfast Willowfield
Party	Candidate	Votes	%	±%
UUP	Harry Midgley	6,539	68.8	−18.7
NI Labour	Norman Searight	2,966	31.2	+18.7
Majority		3,573	37.6	−37.4
Turnout		9,505	59.5	−17.8
UUP hold		Swing		

General Election 1958: Belfast Willowfield
Party	Candidate	Votes	%	±%
UUP	William Hinds	4,017	41.6	−27.2
NI Labour	Norman Searight	2,847	29.5	−1.7
Ind. Unionist	Alfred Walker Shaw	2,785	28.9	New
Majority		1,170	12.1	−25.5
Turnout		9,649	66.6	+7.1
UUP hold		Swing		

General Election 1962: Belfast Willowfield
Party	Candidate	Votes	%	±%
UUP	William Hinds	4,931	58.5	+16.9
NI Labour	Norman Searight	3,497	41.5	+12.0
Majority		1,434	17.0	+4.9
Turnout		8,428	62.0	−4.6
UUP hold		Swing		

General Election 1965: Belfast Willowfield
Party	Candidate	Votes	%	±%
UUP	William Hinds	4,918	64.9	+6.4
NI Labour	Martin McBirney	2,654	35.1	−6.4
Majority		2,264	29.8	+12.8
Turnout		7,572	57.1	−4.9
UUP hold		Swing		

General Election 1969: Belfast Willowfield
Party	Candidate	Votes	%	±%
Ind. Unionist	Tom Caldwell	4,613	54.3	New
UUP	William Hinds	2,134	25.1	−39.8
NI Labour	Billy Boyd	1,747	20.6	−14.5
Majority		2,479	29.2	N/A
Turnout		8,494	68.4	+11.3
Ind. Unionist gain from UUP		Swing		
