= Ards (Northern Ireland Parliament constituency) =

Coordinates: 54.521°N 5.747°W

- Former County constituency for the Parliament of Northern Ireland

Former constituency
- Created: 1929
- Abolished: 1973
- Election method: First past the post

Ards was a constituency of the Parliament of Northern Ireland.

== Boundaries ==
Ards was a county constituency comprising the town of Newtownards, the Ards peninsula and the town of Donaghadee. It was created in 1929 when the House of Commons (Method of Voting and Redistribution of Seats) Act (Northern Ireland) 1929 introduced first past the post elections throughout Northern Ireland. Ards was created by the division of Down into eight new constituencies. The constituency survived unchanged, returning one member of Parliament until the Parliament of Northern Ireland was temporarily suspended in 1972, and then formally abolished in 1973.

== Politics ==
Ards had a unionist majority, and consistently elected Ulster Unionist Party members. It was sometimes contested by members of the Ulster Liberal Party, Northern Ireland Labour Party or Commonwealth Labour Party, who received between 19% and 42% of the votes cast.

== Members of Parliament ==
Elected	Party	Name
1929	UUP	Henry Mulholland
1945	UUP	Robert Perceval-Maxwell
1949	UUP	William May
1962	UUP	William Long

May died during his time in office and his seat was vacant at dissolution.

== Elections ==
General Election 1929: Ards
Party	Candidate	Votes	%	±%
UUP	Henry Mulholland	8,556	67.2	
NI Labour	A. Adams	2,818	22.2	
Ulster Liberal	J. Boyd	1,349	10.6	
Majority		5,738	45.0	
Turnout		12,723	74.7	
UUP win (new seat)				

At the 1933 and 1938 general elections, Henry Mulholland was elected unopposed.

General Election 1945: Ards
Party	Candidate	Votes	%	±%
UUP	Robert Perceval-Maxwell	7,976	58.7	N/A
Commonwealth Labour	Albert McElroy	5,615	41.3	N/A
Majority		2,361	17.4	N/A
Turnout		13,591	70.8	N/A
UUP hold		Swing	N/A	

At the 1949 Northern Ireland general election, William May was elected unopposed.

General Election 1953: Ards
Party	Candidate	Votes	%	±%
UUP	William May	9,562	70.4	N/A
NI Labour	Jack McDowell	4,022	29.6	N/A
Majority		5,540	40.8	N/A
Turnout		13,584	60.0	N/A
UUP hold		Swing	N/A	

At the 1958 Northern Ireland general election, William May was elected unopposed.

General Election 1962: Ards
Party	Candidate	Votes	%	±%
UUP	William Long	7,501	71.4	N/A
Ulster Liberal	Albert McElroy	3,008	28.6	New
Majority		4,493	42.8	N/A
Turnout		10,509	48.6	N/A
UUP hold		Swing	N/A	

General Election 1965: Ards
Party	Candidate	Votes	%	±%
UUP	William Long	7,442	81.0	+9.6
NI Labour	E. Bell	1,740	19.0	New
Majority		5,702	62.0	+19.2
Turnout		9,182	45.1	−3.5
UUP hold		Swing		

At the 1969 Northern Ireland general election, William Long was elected unopposed.

- Parliament prorogued 30 March 1972 and abolished 18 July 1973
