= Brian Maginess =

The Right Honourable Brian Maginness QC

Minister for Labour of Northern Ireland
- In office 2 August 1945 – 12 April 1949

Minister of Home Affairs for Northern Ireland
- In office 4 November 1949 – 26 October 1953

Minister of Finance for Northern Ireland
- In office 13 February 1953 – 20 April 1956

Attorney General of Northern Ireland
- In office 14 April 1956 – 20 March 1964

Member of the Northern Ireland House of Commons
- In office 1938–1964
- Constituency: Iveagh

Personal details
- Born: 10 July 1901 Hillsborough, Ireland
- Died: 16 April 1967 (aged 65) Belfast, Northern Ireland
- Party: Ulster Unionist Party
- Education: Trinity College Dublin
- Profession: Barrister

William Brian Maginess PC (NI) QC (10 July 1901 – 16 April 1967) was a member of the Government of Northern Ireland, who was widely seen as a possible successor to The 1st Viscount Brookeborough as Prime Minister of Northern Ireland.

== Life ==
He was born in 1901, the son of William George Maginess, a Lisburn solicitor, and his wife Mary Sarah Boyd. He was educated at The Wallace High School and Trinity College Dublin from where he graduated with a law degree (LLD), and was called to the Northern Ireland bar in 1923.

Having served in the Royal Corps of Artillery during the Second World War he entered the Parliament of Northern Ireland in 1938 when he won the seat of Iveagh. He entered the Cabinet of Basil Brooke in 1945 when he became Minister of Labour. His stints as the Minister of Home Affairs and Minister of Finance (de facto Deputy Prime Minister) left him favourite to succeed Brooke as Prime Minister of Northern Ireland.

In the early 1950s however, Maginess became a hate figure for the Orange Order when he banned marches through Catholic areas in Counties Down and Londonderry. Brooke demoted him to the non-Cabinet post of Attorney General in April 1956.

While Attorney General, Maginess was party to the case of Attorney General for Northern Ireland v Gallagher [1961] 3 All Er 299, which remains authority in the law of Northern Ireland and England & Wales for the principle that Dutch courage is not a defence in criminal law. Counsel for Gallagher were future Attorney General and Lord Justice, Basil Kelly, and future Stormont MP and Chairman of the Criminal Bar Association in England, Richard Ferguson.

In December 1959, Ian Paisley led a demonstration of Ulster Protestant Action members to Stormont Castle to protest at Lord Brookeborough's refusal to dismiss Maginess and Sir Clarence Graham. They had made speeches at an Ulster Young Unionist Council event supporting Catholic membership of the Ulster Unionist Party.

Having been appointed a King's Counsel in 1946 he was appointed a County Court Judge in 1964 when he resigned from Parliament. He died three years later in Belfast's Royal Victoria Hospital at age 65. A plaque in his memorial is cited inside the Church of Ireland parish church in Hillsborough, where he is buried.

== Sources ==
- The Ulster Unionist Party, 1882–1973 : its development and organisation (1973), J F Harbinson
- Paisley (1985), Moloney & Pollak
- Brian Maginess and the Limits of Liberal Unionism, Irish Review, 25, 1999–2000, Henry Patterson
- Ireland since 1939 (2006), Henry Patterson

Parliament of Northern Ireland
Preceded by John Charles Wilson	Member of Parliament for Iveagh; 1938–1964	Succeeded by Samuel Magowan
Political offices
New post	Parliamentary Secretary at the Ministry of Agriculture; 1941–1943	Vacant
New post	Parliamentary Secretary at the Ministry of Public Security; 1941–1943	Office abolished
Preceded by Sir Wilson Hungerford	Parliamentary Secretary to the Ministry of Commerce and Production; 1943–1945	Vacant
Preceded by William Grant	Minister of Labour; 1945–49	Succeeded by Harry Midgley
Preceded by Edmond Warnock	Minister of Home Affairs; 1946	Succeeded by Edmond Warnock
Preceded by Roland Nugent	Minister of Commerce and Production; 1949	Succeeded by William McCleery
Preceded by Edmond Warnock	Minister of Home Affairs; 1949–53	Succeeded by George Hanna
Preceded by John Maynard Sinclair	Minister of Finance; 1953–56	Succeeded by George Hanna
Preceded by Edmond Warnock	Attorney General for Northern Ireland; 1956–64	Succeeded by Edward Warburton Jones
