= Stormont government =

Stormont government can refer to:

- Government of Northern Ireland (1921–1972)
- Northern Ireland Executive, since 1998
