= Jayne Brady =

Head of the Northern Ireland Civil Service since 2021 (born 1972)

Jayne Brady MBE
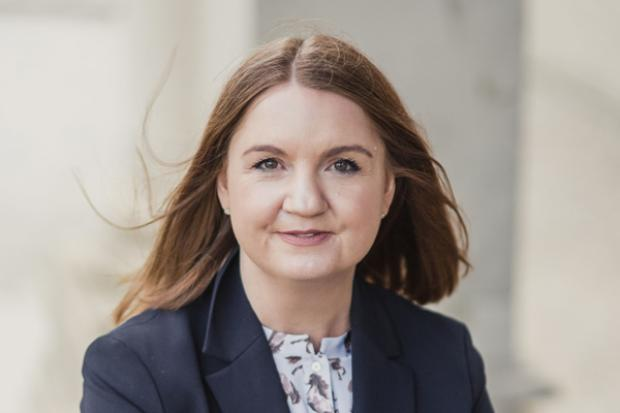

Head of the Northern Ireland Civil Service
- Incumbent
- Assumed office 1 September 2021
- Preceded by: Jenny Pyper (interim)

Personal details
- Born: 1972 (age 53–54)
- Education: Queen's University Belfast

Jayne Brady, MBE (born 1972) is a senior civil servant who currently serves as Head of the Northern Ireland Civil Service, a position she has held since 1 September 2021. The role also has the responsibility of being principal policy adviser to the First Minister and deputy First Minister, and Secretary to the Northern Ireland Executive.

== Career ==
Jayne spent the majority of her career in the private sector, working in engineering and technology businesses. In 2013, she left her role as vice-president at Intune Networks, and became a partner at Kernel Capital, a role she held until 2020.

In the 2018 New Year Honours, Brady was appointed Member of the Order of the British Empire (MBE) "for services to Economic Development in Northern Ireland".

She joined Belfast City Council in April 2020 to be their Digital Innovation Commissioner.

In September 2020, she was appointed to the UK Government's Innovation Expert Group.

In June 2021, then First Minister Arlene Foster and deputy First Minister Michelle O'Neill announced that Brady would take over from Jenny Pyper as Head of the Northern Ireland Civil Service. She was the first person to be appointed to the role since the permanent secretary role was created within The Executive Office, therefore, she does not have the responsibility of managing The Executive Office. However, she does still serve as their Secretary, and as principal policy adviser to the First Minister and deputy First Minister. Although she replaced Jenny Pyper in the role, she was only serving in an interim position following the resignation of David Sterling in August 2020. Brady was appointed in the second recruitment round for the role, after First Minister Arlene Foster and deputy First Minister Michelle O'Neill failed to agree on a preferred candidate in the first round.
