= John W. Renshaw =

Unionist politician in Northern Ireland (1877–1955)

John W. Renshaw (28 December 1877 – 12 October 1955) was a unionist politician in Northern Ireland.

Born in Newry, Renshaw studied at the Newry Intermediate School, Queen's College, Galway and Queen's College, Belfast, before becoming a teacher at the Croydon High School. In 1911, he moved to become Principal of the Shaftesbury House Tutorial College.

In 1943, Renshaw was elected to the Northern Ireland House of Commons to represent the Queen's University of Belfast for the Ulster Unionist Party, although he did not stand at the 1945 Northern Ireland general election. He was a member of the Senate of Queen's University Belfast from 1938 until his death.

In his spare time, Renshaw was a member of the Freemasons.

Parliament of Northern Ireland
Preceded by Robert Corkey; John MacDermott; Howard Stevenson; William Lyle	Member of Parliament for Queen's University; 1943–1945; With: John MacDermott to 1944; Howard Stevenson 1928–1949; William Lyle to 1945; Herbert Quin from 1944	Succeeded by Frederick McSorley; Herbert Quin; Howard Stevenson; Irene Calvert
