= Minister of Public Security (Northern Ireland) =

The Minister of Public Security was a member of the Executive Committee of the Privy Council of Northern Ireland (Cabinet) in the Parliament of Northern Ireland from 1940 to 1944.

#	Name	Took office	Prime Minister	Party
1.	John MacDermott	25 June 1940	Craigavon, Andrews	UUP
2.	William Grant	10 November 1941	Andrews	UUP
3.	Harry Midgley	6 May 1943	Brooke	Commonwealth Labour

== Parliamentary Secretary to the Ministry of Public Security ==
- 1941 – 1943 Brian Maginess

Office abolished 1943
