= John MacDermott, Baron MacDermott =

The Right Honourable The Lord MacDermott MC PC PC (NI)
- MacDermott in 1950.

Lord Chief Justice of Northern Ireland
- In office 1951–1971
- Preceded by: Sir James Andrews, Bt.
- Succeeded by: The Lord Lowry

Lord of Appeal in Ordinary
- In office 23 April 1947 – 6 April 1951
- Preceded by: The Lord Wright
- Succeeded by: The Lord Asquith of Bishopstone

Personal details
- Born: John Clarke MacDermott

John Clarke MacDermott, Baron MacDermott, MC, PC, PC (NI) (12 April 1896 – 13 July 1979), was a Northern Irish politician, barrister, and judge who served as Attorney General for Northern Ireland, a Lord of Appeal in Ordinary, and Lord Chief Justice of Northern Ireland. He was the first law lord to be appointed from Northern Ireland.

The son of a Belfast Presbyterian clergyman, MacDermott served with distinction with the British Army on the Western Front during the First World War, winning a Military Cross, before reading Law at the Queen's University of Belfast. After being called to the bar in both Dublin and Belfast, he acquired a busy practice in Northern Ireland, taking silk in 1936. In 1938, he was elected to the Northern Ireland House of Commons as an Ulster Unionist member, rejoined the British Army the following year on the outbreak of the Second World War, and was released from military service in 1941 to enable him to become Minister of Public Security in the Government of Northern Ireland. In 1941, he became Attorney General for Northern Ireland, serving until his elevation to the Northern Irish High Court in 1944.

In 1947, MacDermott was appointed a Lord of Appeal in Ordinary and was elevated to the House of Lords. In 1951, he returned to Belfast to become Lord Chief Justice of Northern Ireland, though he continued to sit occasionally in London. He retired in 1977, and in the same year was severely wounded in a terrorist attack whilst delivering a lecture. He died two years later. His son, also John Clarke MacDermott, was a Lord Justice of Appeal in Northern Ireland.

== Biography ==
John Clarke MacDermott was born in Belfast in 1896, the third surviving son and sixth of seven children of the Reverend John MacDermott DD, a Presbyterian clergyman who was minister of Belmont and moderator of the Presbyterian Church in Ireland, and of his wife Lydia Allen MacDermott (née Wilson), the daughter of a Strabane solicitor. He was educated at Campbell College, Belfast, from where he won a scholarship to read law at the Queen's University Belfast in 1914.

During the First World War, he served with the machine gun battalion of the 51st (Highland) Division in France, winning the Military Cross in 1918.

After serving with the Machine Gun Corps in France, Belgium and Germany during the First World War, for which he was awarded the Military Cross and reached the rank of Lieutenant, MacDermott was called to the Bar of Ireland in 1921.

Eight years later he was appointed to determine industrial assurance disputes in Northern Ireland, and in 1931 he became a lecturer in Jurisprudence at Queen's University, teaching for four years.

In 1936 he was made a King's Counsel, and two years later he was elected to the Northern Ireland House of Commons as an Ulster Unionist member for Queen's University.

In 1940, MacDermott was appointed Minister of Public Security in the Government of Northern Ireland, and the following year became the Attorney General for Northern Ireland. He was succeeded in this post by William Lowry, whose son, Robert Lowry, Baron Lowry, would eventually succeed MacDermott as Lord Chief Justice. In 1944 he resigned his parliamentary seat on appointment as a High Court Judge for Northern Ireland, and three years later, on 23 April 1947 was made a Lord of Appeal in Ordinary, becoming a life peer as Baron MacDermott, of Belmont in the City of Belfast.

Lord MacDermott returned from the House of Lords to take up his appointment as Lord Chief Justice of Northern Ireland; his successors to the latter office have become Law Lords subsequently. Whilst LCJ, he was affectionately known as "the Baron".

In 1977, aged over eighty, Lord MacDermott offered to redeliver a lecture at the Ulster College, which had been interrupted by a bomb meant for him and which had severely wounded him.

Having been made a Northern Ireland Privy Counsellor seven years earlier, Lord MacDermott was sworn of the British Privy Council in 1947.

Four years later, in 1951, he was appointed Lord Chief Justice of Northern Ireland, a post he held for twenty years. He was also Pro-Chancellor of his alma mater from 1951 to 1969. In 1958, he chaired the commission on the Isle of Man Constitution. He died in 1979.

In 1926, he wed Louise Palmer Johnston, later Lady MacDermott. Their son, Sir John MacDermott, was also sworn into the British Privy Council in 1987, as a Lord Justice of Appeal in Northern Ireland. He later became a Surveillance Commissioner for Northern Ireland.

== See also ==
- List of Northern Ireland Members of the House of Lords

Parliament of Northern Ireland
Preceded by Robert Corkey; John Hanna Robb; Robert James Johnstone; Arthur Brownlow Mitchell	Member of Parliament for Queen's University of Belfast; 1938–1944; With: Robert Corkey to 1943; Robert James Johnstone to 1938; Arthur Brownlow Mitchell to 1942; Howard Stevenson from 1938; William Lyle from 1942; John W. Renshaw from 1943	Succeeded by Herbert Quin; Howard Stevenson; William Lyle; John W. Renshaw
Political offices
New office	Minister of Public Security; 1940–1941	Succeeded by William Grant
Preceded by Arthur Black	Attorney General for Northern Ireland; 1941–1944	Succeeded by William Lowry
Legal offices
Preceded by James Andrews	Lord Chief Justice of Northern Ireland; 1951–1971	Succeeded by Robert Lowry
