= Albert McElroy =

Personal life
- Born: 14 February 1915 Glasgow, Scotland
- Died: 13 March 1975 (aged 60)
- Education: Trinity College Dublin; Manchester College, Oxford

Religious life
- Religion: Christian
- Denomination: Non-subscribing Presbyterian
- Church: 1st Non-subscribing Presbyterian Church, Newtownards

Senior posting
- Period in office: 1954-75

Albert Horatio McElroy (14 February 1915 – 13 March 1975) was a minister of religion and politician in Northern Ireland.

Born in Glasgow, McElroy studied at Trinity College Dublin, then at Manchester College in Oxford (since 1996 known as Harris Manchester College).

McElroy joined the Northern Ireland Labour Party (NILP), in which he acted as an ally of Harry Midgley, and was elected as party chair. He also became a local councillor. In 1942, Midgley split away to form the Commonwealth Labour Party. McElroy followed, and he stood for the party in Ards at the 1945 Northern Ireland general election. He was one of the more successful candidates, taking 41.5% of the vote, but was not elected. In 1947, Midgley disbanded the party and joined the Ulster Unionists. McElroy was the most prominent of a small group of members who instead returned to the NILP.

At the 1950 UK general election, McElroy stood for the NILP in North Down, receiving 20.6% of the votes cast, taking him to a distant second place. He stood again in the 1951 general election, but fell back to 18.6%.

McElroy became the Minister of the 1st Non-subscribing Presbyterian Church in Newtownards in 1954, a post he held until his death.

In the 1950s, McElroy left the NILP, and founded the Ulster Liberal Party, of which he became leader. He stood for his new party at the 1958 Northern Ireland general election for the Queen's University Belfast seat, but was narrowly defeated, taking fifth place in the four-seat constituency. At the 1964 UK general election, he stood in North Down, but was unable to match his performances for the NILP, taking only 6.2% of the votes cast. At the 1965 Stormont election, he was defeated in Enniskillen.

McElroy's party colleague Sheelagh Murnaghan was elected for Queen's University in 1961 and re-elected in 1965, so when a by-election arose the following year, McElroy stood. He was defeated in a close vote by the Ulster Unionist candidate.

McElroy was active in the civil rights protests in the late 1960s, and spoke alongside Nationalist Party politicians such as Eddie McAteer and Austin Currie.
