= Belfast St Anne's (Northern Ireland Parliament constituency) =

Constituency of the Parliament of Northern Ireland

Coordinates: 54.587°N 5.956°W

- Former Borough constituency for the Parliament of Northern Ireland
- Belfast shown within Northern Ireland

Former constituency
- Created: 1929
- Abolished: 1973
- Election method: First past the post

Belfast St Anne's was a constituency of the Parliament of Northern Ireland.

== Boundaries ==
Belfast St Anne's was a borough constituency comprising part of south-western Belfast. It was created in 1929 when the House of Commons (Method of Voting and Redistribution of Seats) Act (Northern Ireland) 1929 introduced first past the post elections throughout Northern Ireland.

Belfast St Anne's was created by the division of Belfast West into four new constituencies. It survived unchanged, returning one member of Parliament, until the Parliament of Northern Ireland was temporarily suspended in 1972, and then formally abolished in 1973.

The constituency contained areas between the current Lisburn Road and Falls Road and consisted of the former St George's ward and most of the former St Anne's ward - although unusually it did not include the eponymous cathedral which was in Belfast Central.

The constituency is now part of Belfast South and Belfast West.

== Politics ==
The constituency was solidly unionist and always elected Ulster Unionist Party Members of Parliament, but was usually contested by labour movement candidates who sometimes polled well.

== Members of Parliament ==
Election	Member	Party
1929	James Hanna McCormick	Ulster Unionist Party
1938	Edmond Warnock	Ulster Unionist Party
1969	Norman Laird	Ulster Unionist Party
1970(b)	John Laird	Ulster Unionist Party
1973	Constituency abolished	

== Election results ==
General Election 1929: Belfast St Anne's
Party	Candidate	Votes	%	±%
UUP	James Hanna McCormick	6,686	47.2	
Ind. Unionist	Philip James Woods	5,273	37.2	
Local Option	Emily Moffat Clow	2,209	15.6	
Majority		1,413	10.0	
Turnout		14,168	71.5	
UUP win (new seat)				

General Election 1933: Belfast St Anne's
Party	Candidate	Votes	%	±%
UUP	James Hanna McCormick	9,533	71.6	+23.4
NI Labour	William John Donaldson	3,790	28.4	New
Majority		5,743	43.2	+33.2
Turnout		13,323	59.3	−12.2
UUP hold		Swing		

General Election 1938: Belfast St Anne's
Party	Candidate	Votes	%	±%
UUP	Edmond Warnock	11,183	68.4	−3.2
Progressive Unionist	J. D. Wallace	5,172	31.6	New
Majority		6,011	36.8	−7.4
Turnout		16,355	66.7	+7.4
UUP hold		Swing		

General Election 1945: Belfast St Anne's
Party	Candidate	Votes	%	±%
UUP	Edmond Warnock	10,119	56.9	−11.5
NI Labour	Joseph Lowden	7,674	43.1	New
Majority		2,445	13.8	−23.0
Turnout		17,793	66.7	0.0
UUP hold		Swing		

General Election 1949: Belfast St Anne's
Party	Candidate	Votes	%	±%
UUP	Edmond Warnock	15,312	76.1	+19.2
NI Labour	Robert S. Thompson	4,811	23.9	−19.2
Majority		10,501	52.2	+38.4
Turnout		20,123	75.4	+8.7
UUP hold		Swing		

At the 1953 and 1958 general elections, Edmond Warnock was elected unopposed.

General Election 1962: Belfast St Anne's
Party	Candidate	Votes	%	±%
UUP	Edmond Warnock	8,940	60.6	N/A
NI Labour	A. Holmes	5,807	39.4	New
Majority		3,133	21.2	N/A
Turnout		14,747	64.8	N/A
UUP hold		Swing	N/A	

General Election 1965: Belfast St Anne's
Party	Candidate	Votes	%	±%
UUP	Edmond Warnock	7,316	62.9	+2.3
NI Labour	William Victor Blease	4,312	37.1	−2.3
Majority		3,004	25.8	+4.6
Turnout		11,628	53.3	−11.5
UUP hold		Swing		

General Election 1969: Belfast St Anne's
Party	Candidate	Votes	%	±%
UUP	Norman Laird	7,126	53.0	−9.9
Ind. Unionist	William McKee	4,183	31.1	New
National Democratic	John D. Murphy	2,136	15.9	New
Majority		2,943	21.9	−3.9
Turnout		13,445	70.6	+17.3
UUP hold		Swing		

Belfast St Anne's by-election, 1970
Party	Candidate	Votes	%	±%
UUP	John Laird	8,204	68.8	+15.8
SDLP	Gerald Malachy Lavery	2,881	24.2	New
NI Labour	William Ritchie	836	7.0	New
Majority		5,323	44.6	+22.7
Turnout		11,921	59.0	−11.6
UUP hold		Swing		
