= North Antrim (Northern Ireland Parliament constituency) =

Constituency of the Northern Ireland Parliament (1929–1973)

Coordinates: 55.121°N 6.329°W

- Former County constituency for the Parliament of Northern Ireland
- North Antrim shown within Northern Ireland

Former constituency
- Created: 1929
- Abolished: 1973
- Election method: First past the post

North Antrim was a constituency of the Northern Ireland House of Commons.

The House of Commons (Method of Voting and Redistribution of Seats) Act (Northern Ireland), 1929 introduced first-past-the-post elections for 48 single-member constituencies (including Antrim North).

This constituency was one of seven county divisions in Antrim, so it was smaller than the UK Parliament seat. From 1969 there were nine county divisions in Antrim, but the changes in the vicinity of Belfast did not affect the boundaries of this division.

It comprised (in terms of local government units existing in 1929) parts of the rural districts of Ballycastle and Ballymoney together with the whole of the urban districts of Ballycastle, Ballymoney and Portrush.

It returned one member of Parliament from 1929 until the Parliament of Northern Ireland was temporarily suspended in 1972, and then formally abolished in 1973.

== Politics ==
County Antrim (except for parts of Belfast) is a strongly unionist area. There has never been the slightest chance of a republican or nationalist candidate being elected in a single-member Antrim county constituency, however the boundaries were drawn. Antrim North has not been an exception.

At the Northern Ireland general election of 1929 the new Antrim North division was the scene of a reasonably close Unionist/Liberal contest (less than a 20% majority). However this was the last appearance of a Liberal candidate for the Northern Ireland Parliament constituency, which became an extremely safe Unionist seat for the rest of its existence.

== Members of Parliament ==
Election	Member	Party
1929	Robert Lynn	Ulster Unionist
1945	William McCleery	Ulster Unionist
1958	Phelim O'Neill	Ulster Unionist
1972	Phelim O'Neill	Alliance Party
1973	constituency abolished	

== Elections ==
The elections in this constituency took place using the first past the post electoral system.

General Election 22 May 1929: Antrim North
Party	Candidate	Votes	%	±%
UUP	Robert Lynn	6,584	59.76	
Ulster Liberal	Robert Nathaniel Boyd	4,433	40.24	
Majority		2,151	19.52	
Turnout		17,591	62.63	
UUP win (new seat)				

General Election 30 November 1933: Antrim North
Party	Candidate	Votes	%	±%
UUP	Robert Lynn	Unopposed	N/A	N/A
UUP hold		Swing	N/A	

General Election 9 February 1938: Antrim North
Party	Candidate	Votes	%	±%
UUP	Robert Lynn	8,194	64.67	N/A
Progressive Unionist	Robert Nathaniel Boyd	4,477	35.33	New
Majority		3,717	29.34	N/A
Turnout		18,221	69.54	N/A
UUP hold		Swing	N/A	

General Election 14 June 1945: Antrim North
Party	Candidate	Votes	%	±%
UUP	Robert Lynn	9,264	73.47	+8.80
NI Labour	Alexander Stewart	3,345	26.53	New
Majority		5,919	46.94	+17.60
Turnout		19,304	65.32	−4.22
UUP hold		Swing		

- Death of Lynn

North Antrim by-election, 1945
Party	Candidate	Votes	%	±%
UUP	William McCleery	Unopposed	N/A	N/A
UUP hold		Swing	N/A	

General Election 10 February 1949: Antrim North
Party	Candidate	Votes	%	±%
UUP	William McCleery	Unopposed	N/A	N/A
UUP hold		Swing	N/A	

General Election 22 October 1953: Antrim North
Party	Candidate	Votes	%	±%
UUP	William McCleery	Unopposed	N/A	N/A
UUP hold		Swing	N/A	

- Seat vacant on dissolution (death of McCleery)

General Election 20 March 1958: Antrim North
Party	Candidate	Votes	%	±%
UUP	Phelim O'Neill	Unopposed	N/A	N/A
UUP hold		Swing	N/A	

General Election 31 May 1962: Antrim North
Party	Candidate	Votes	%	±%
UUP	Phelim O'Neill	Unopposed	N/A	N/A
UUP hold		Swing	N/A	

General Election 25 November 1965: Antrim North
Party	Candidate	Votes	%	±%
UUP	Phelim O'Neill	Unopposed	N/A	N/A
UUP hold		Swing	N/A	

General Election 24 February 1969: Antrim North
Party	Candidate	Votes	%	±%
UUP	Phelim O'Neill	9,142	73.83	N/A
Protestant Unionist	John Wylie	3,241	26.17	New
Majority		5,901	47.66	N/A
Turnout		19,611	63.14	N/A
UUP hold		Swing	N/A	

- Parliament prorogued 30 March 1972 and abolished 18 July 1973
