= William Hinds (politician) =

Northern Irish politician

Member of Parliament for Belfast Willowfield
- In office 27 February 1958 – 24 February 1969
- Preceded by: Harry Midgley
- Succeeded by: Tom Caldwell

Personal details
- Born: 1906 Belfast, Northern Ireland
- Political party: Ulster Unionist

William Sharpe Hinds (born 1906, date of death unknown) was a Northern Irish unionist politician.

== Background ==
Hinds grew up in Belfast, becoming the owner of an engineering business. He was also elected as an Ulster Unionist Party Member of Belfast City Council. At the 1958 Northern Ireland general election, he was elected in Belfast Willowfield, and he served until his defeat in 1969 by unofficial Unionist Tom Caldwell who supported O'Neill's reform proposals. While he had the support at that election of the Ormeau Unionist Association and the Willowfield Women's Unionist Association, the Willowfield Unionist Club, another local affiliate of the Ulster Unionist Council, backed Caldwell, and this split became a long-term dispute among party activists in the area.

Parliament of Northern Ireland
Preceded by Harry Midgley	Member of Parliament for Belfast Willowfield; 1958–1969	Succeeded by Tom Caldwell
