= Jenny Pyper =

Northern Irish civil servant

Jenny Pyper is a Northern Irish civil servant. She was appointed as Interim Head of the Northern Ireland Civil Service, taking up the position for eight months from 1 December 2020, and succeeding David Sterling, who stepped down from the role in August of that year. Pyper previously was Chief Executive of the Utility Regulator. Pyper is Pro-Chancellor of and Chair of Council for Ulster University since 2020. She is a Fellow of the Geological Society of London, and a Fellow of the Energy Institute.

== Career ==
Pyper studied geography science at Ulster University. Pyper then joined the civil service in 1985, and worked in a number of economic development roles. In 2004, she was appointed as Director of Energy Policy at the Department of Enterprise, Trade and Investment, before later taking up the role of Director of Regional Planning and Transportation at the Department for Regional Development. In 2011 she became Deputy Secretary at the Department for Social Development, and joined the Utility Regulator in 2013. She retired from the Utility Regulator in the autumn of 2020. Her appointment as interim head of the Northern Ireland Civil Service was announced after Arlene Foster and Michelle O'Neill, Northern Ireland's First and Deputy First Ministers respectively, were unable to agree on a permanent candidate for the post. She became the first woman to occupy the role.

Since 2020, Pyper has been Pro-Chancellor and Chair of Council for Ulster University. She is also a board member of Business in the Community (NI).

In June 2022, Ulster University awarded Pyper an honorary doctorate (DUniv). Pyper is a Fellow of the Geological Society of London, and a Fellow of the Energy Institute.
