= Joseph Cunningham (Northern Ireland politician) =

Joseph Cunningham (1877–July 1965) was a Belfast trade unionist and an Ulster Unionist politician in Northern Ireland.

Cunningham worked as a fitter in the Harland & Wolff shipyard Belfast, and was prominent in the local branch of the Amalgamated Society of Engineers. In 1912, he voted against the union paying a levy to the Labour Party, which supported Irish Home Rule, and was the only delegate to a union conference not to join a protest against the imprisonment of Tom Mann.

Cunningham was both a unionist and an Orangeman, joining the Mechanics' 1200 Loyal Orange Lodge, Clifton St., Belfast, and eventually being elected Orange Order county grand master of Belfast (1948–51) and deputy grand master of Ireland.

Having been a founder member in 1918, and subsequently chairman, of the Ulster Unionist Labour Association, in 1921 he nominated by the new Northern Ireland Prime Minister, James Craig, to the first Senate of Northern Ireland. He became the longest-serving senator, remaining in post until his death in 1965.

Cunningham was also to serve for 34 years (1930–1964) as an Ulster Unionist on the Belfast City Council. He was again at odds with others in the labour movement. In September 1932, on the eve of demonstrations (and of running battles with the police) that saw Catholics and Protestants overcoming sectarian division in protest against unemployment and low rates of Outdoor Relief, he was challenged his fellow Dock councillor, Harry Midgely to an open electoral contest. Midgely, secretary of the Northern Ireland Labour Party, dismissed as "laughable" Cunningham's contention that relief was so low because wages were too high. Rejecting the challenge, Cunningham declared that he was satisfied that he was "representing the views of the majority of working class electors" of the Dock Ward by supporting negotiations with employers for "a reduction of wages and salaries".
