= Norman Laird =

Norman Laird (1906 – 28 April 1970) was a medical doctor and unionist politician in Northern Ireland.

Laird studied at the Royal Belfast Academical Institution and the Queen's University of Belfast. He became a doctor and joined the Ulster Unionist Party (UUP), and chaired its St Anne's branch from 1948 until 1969. He was awarded an OBE in 1961.

Laird was elected for the UUP in Belfast St Anne's at the 1969 Northern Ireland general election. In March 1970, he was one of five UUP MPs expelled from the Ulster Unionist parliamentary party for refusing to support the government in a vote of no confidence. He died the following month. In the ensuing by-election, his seat was won by his son, John Laird.

Parliament of Northern Ireland
Preceded by Edmond Warnock	Member of Parliament for Belfast St Anne's; 1969–1970	Succeeded by John Laird
