= Robert Perceval-Maxwell (politician, born 1896) =

Northern Ireland politician

Major John Robert Perceval-Maxwell (1896–1963) was an Ulster Unionist Party politician from Northern Ireland.

Perceval-Maxwell was educated at Eton College and the Royal Military College, Sandhurst. He was called to the Bar but did not practice as a Barrister. From 1935 to 1941 he was a member of the Senate of Northern Ireland, and again from 1941 until his resignation in 1945. Between 1937 and 1937 he was Deputy Speaker of the Senate.

He sat in the Northern Ireland House of Commons representing Ards from the general election of 1945 until the general election of 1949. when he retired after being deselected. He was Parliamentary Secretary to the Ministry of Commerce from 21 September 1945 to 26 February 1949.

He lived at Finnebrogue House, Downpatrick.

Parliament of Northern Ireland
| Preceded by Henry Mulholland | Member of Parliament for Ards; 1945–1949 | Succeeded by William May |
Political offices
| Vacant | Parliamentary Secretary to the Ministry of Commerce and Production; 1943–1945 | Succeeded by 2nd Baron Glentoran |
