= Nigel Hamilton (civil servant) =

Northern Irish civil servant

Sir Nigel Hamilton, KCB, DL (born 1948), was Head of the Northern Ireland Civil Service from 2002 to 2008.

He became a Knight Commander of the Order of the Bath in the 2008 New Year Honours. Hamilton was made an Honorary Graduate of the University of Ulster and awarded a doctor of the university (DUniv) on 3 July 2008 in recognition of his contribution to public administration in Northern Ireland especially during the years of the Northern Ireland peace process.
