= William McCleery =

Northern Irish politician (1887–1957)

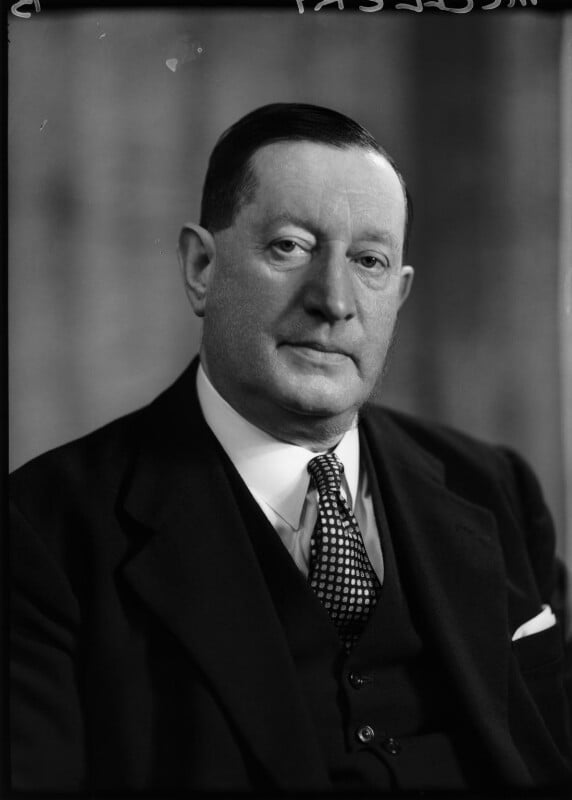
McCleery in 1950

Sir William Victor McCleery (17 July 1887 – 30 October 1957) was a prominent Unionist in Northern Ireland.

McCleery was the managing director of Hale, Martin and Company, and from 1921 until 1946 was the President of the Ballymoney Chamber of Commerce, from 1922 until 1945 was chair of the North Antrim Agricultural Association, and from 1931 to 1946 was President of the North Antrim Unionist Association. He was also the Grand Master of the Orange Order in County Antrim.

McCleery was elected as the Ulster Unionist Party (UUP) Member of Parliament for North Antrim at a by-election in 1945. In 1949, he briefly served as Minister of Labour, before becoming Minister of Commerce until 1953. In 1949, he was also appointed to the Privy Council of Northern Ireland. After being relieved of his ministerial post, he became chairman of the Unionist Back Bench Committee until 1956. He was knighted in 1954.

McCleery was proposed by James Bailie was a possible candidate for Grand Master of the Grand Orange Lodge in Ireland, and following the withdrawal of all the other serious candidates, took up the post in 1954. Still an MP, he used the position to support the UUP Government of Northern Ireland. The following year, he became Grand Master of the Imperial Grand Orange Council of the World.

Parliament of Northern Ireland
| Preceded by Robert Lynn | Member of Parliament for North Antrim; 1945–1958 | Succeeded by Phelim O'Neill |
Political offices
| Preceded by Brian Maginess | Minister of Labour and National Insurance; 1949 | Succeeded by Harry Midgley |
| Preceded by Brian Maginess | Minister of Commerce and Production; 1949–1953 | Succeeded by 2nd Baron Glentoran |
Non-profit organization positions
| Preceded by J. M. Andrews | Grand Master of the Orange Institution of Ireland; 1954–1957 | Succeeded by George Anthony Clark |
