= Northern Ireland Civil Service =

Permanent bureaucracy of the Northern Ireland Executive

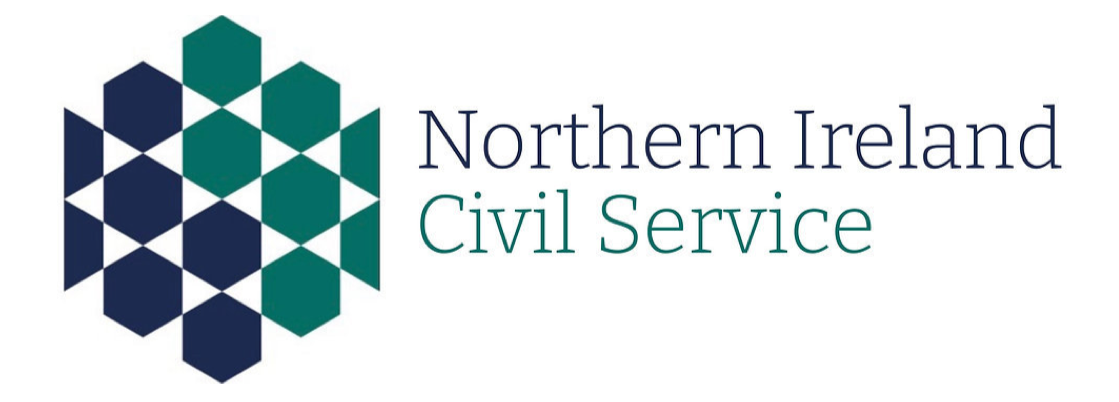
- Logo

Organisation overview
- Organisation executives: Jayne Brady, Head; David Malcolm, Permanent Secretary; Chris Stewart, Deputy Secretary
- Website: Official website

The Northern Ireland Civil Service (NICS; Irish: Státseirbhís Thuaisceart Éireann; Ulster-Scots: Norlin Airlann Cïvil Sarvice) is the permanent bureaucracy of employees that supports the Northern Ireland Executive, the devolved government of Northern Ireland.

The NICS is one of three civil services in the United Kingdom, the others being the Home Civil Service and HM Diplomatic Service. The heads of these services are members of the Permanent Secretaries Management Group.

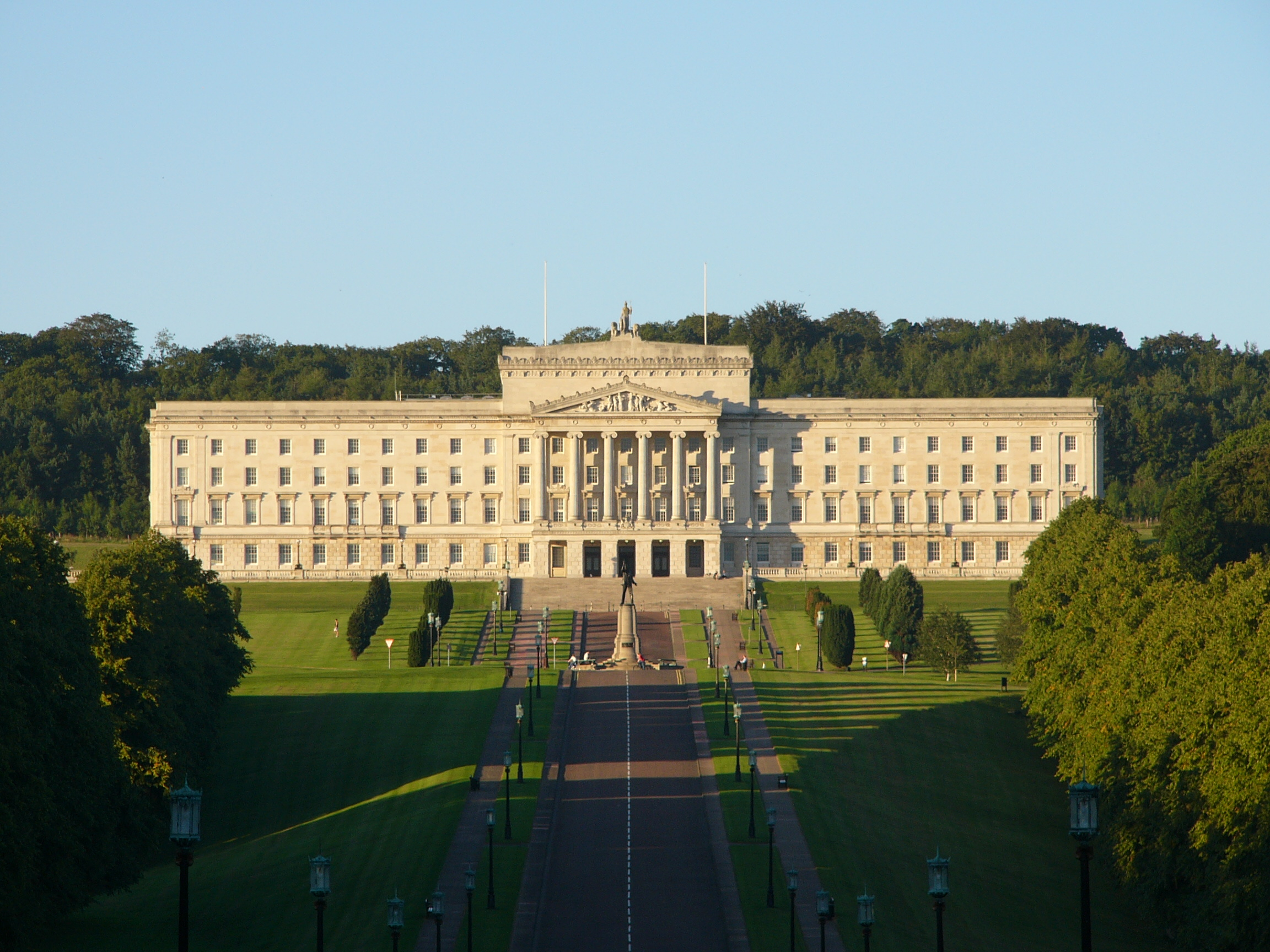
A general view of Parliament Buildings, home of the Northern Ireland Assembly

== History ==
=== 1921–1972 ===
Northern Ireland was established by the Government of Ireland Act 1920 and the first devolved Parliament of Northern Ireland took office on 7 June 1921. The first civil servants were transferred from the Irish Civil Service headquartered at Dublin Castle. The departments of the Northern Ireland Government were initially the following:

- Department of the Prime Minister
- Ministry of Agriculture
- Ministry of Commerce
- Ministry of Education
- Ministry of Finance
- Ministry of Home Affairs
- Ministry of Labour

An additional Ministry of Health and Local Government was formed in 1944, in preparation for the National Health Service and other aspects of the welfare state. In 1965, that department was split between the Ministry of Health and Social Services and the new Ministry of Development. A further Ministry of Community Relations was established in 1969, in response to the early stages of the Troubles.

=== 1972–1999 ===
The Parliament of Northern Ireland was dissolved on 30 March 1972, when direct rule was imposed by the United Kingdom Government. The Secretary of State for Northern Ireland assumed responsibility for government and was assisted by a new Northern Ireland Office. The NIO absorbed the Ministry of Home Affairs and took direct responsibility for security, justice and constitutional policy.

Following the Sunningdale Agreement, a power-sharing Northern Ireland Executive briefly held office between 1 January 1974 and 28 May 1974. The following departments were accountable to the Executive:

- Department of Agriculture
- Department of Commerce
- Department of Education
- Department of the Environment
- Department of Finance
- Department of Health and Social Services
- Department of Housing, Local Government and Planning
- Office of Law Reform

The Executive collapsed due to the loyalist Ulster Workers' Council Strike and direct rule resumed. The Troubles continued in the absence of a political settlement.

Between May 1974 and December 1999, departments were led politically by junior ministers in the Northern Ireland Office. UK Governments alternated between the Conservative and Labour parties, neither of which included Members of Parliament from Northern Ireland. The Northern Ireland Civil Service, uniquely in the British Isles and Western Europe, was not accountable to locally elected political representatives during this time.

From 1982 to 1999, there were six departments:

- Department of Agriculture
- Department of Economic Development
- Department of Education
- Department of the Environment
- Department of Finance and Personnel
- Department of Health and Social Services

=== 1999–2016 ===
The Good Friday Agreement (April 1998) led to the formation of the Northern Ireland Executive (accountable to the Northern Ireland Assembly) on 2 December 1999, which ended 25 years of direct rule. The Executive was suspended several times due to political disputes (notably from October 2002 to May 2007) and each suspension resulted in the return of direct rule. Devolution was restored on 8 May 2007 and was partially interrupted in late 2015, due to the resignation of Democratic Unionist Party (DUP) ministers due to alleged Provisional IRA activity.

Devolution resulted in an increase in the number of Civil Service departments, accountable to a cross-community Executive of 11 ministers. The Executive initially had 10 departments, which were often described by the Northern Ireland Civil Service and the media through abbreviations (see brackets below):

- Office of the First Minister and deputy First Minister (two ministers acting jointly) (OFMDFM)
- Department of Agriculture and Rural Development (DARD)
- Department of Culture, Arts and Leisure (DCAL)
- Department of Education (DE)
- Department of Enterprise, Trade and Investment (DETI)
- Department of the Environment (DoE)
- Department of Finance and Personnel (DFP)
- Department of Health, Social Services and Public Safety (DHSSPS)
- Department of Higher and Further Education, Training and Employment (DHFETE) (later renamed Department for Employment and Learning, or DEL)
- Department for Regional Development (DRD)
- Department for Social Development (DSD)

The number of departments increased to 11 (and ministers to 12) when the Department of Justice (abbreviated to DoJ) was created on 12 April 2010. The Northern Ireland Office continued in operation, representing the interests of the United Kingdom Government in Northern Ireland.

=== 2016 onwards ===
Following the Fresh Start Agreement (November 2015), the parties of Northern Ireland agreed that the number of Executive departments should be reduced. This took effect following the next election to the Northern Ireland Assembly in 2016 and reduced the number of Civil Service departments (as three departments were dissolved and its roles amalgamated with other departments). The departments (with official abbreviations) are as follows:

- The Executive Office (TEO)
- Department of Agriculture, Environment and Rural Affairs (DAERA)
- Department for Communities (DfC)
- Department for the Economy (DfE)
- Department of Education (DE)
- Department of Finance (DoF)
- Department of Health (DoH)
- Department for Infrastructure (DfI)
- Department of Justice (DoJ)

The Northern Ireland Executive ceased to operate in January 2017, following the resignation of Martin McGuinness (Sinn Féin) as deputy First Minister during a dispute between the DUP and Sinn Féin over the Renewable Heat Incentive scandal. An early election to the Northern Ireland Assembly took place in March 2017 but the Northern Ireland Executive was not formed afterwards due to continued disputes between the DUP and Sinn Féin.

Each department is currently led by a Permanent Secretary, or the Head of the Civil Service in the case of the Executive Office. The Permanent Secretaries Group meets monthly and effectively the highest level of government in Northern Ireland in the absence of the Executive. The interim Head of the Northern Ireland Civil Service has been vacant since August 2020, but Jenny Pyper has been temporary appointed as interim Head of the Northern Ireland Civil Service for the term of eight months from 1 December 2020 pending the appointment of a permanent interim Head of the Northern Ireland Civil Service. Jayne Brady is now the Head of the Civil Service in Northern Ireland.

== Composition ==
As of June 2011, the Northern Ireland Civil Service employed 25,847 staff (out of a total public sector employment of 218,577). The breakdown by department was as follows:

Department	Employment
Office of the First and deputy First Minister	384
Department of Agriculture and Rural Development	3,040
Department for Culture, Arts and Leisure	274
Department of Education	613
Department for Employment and Learning	2,109
Department of Enterprise, Trade and Investment	583
Department of the Environment	2,683
Department of Finance and Personnel	3,589
Department of Health, Social Services and Public Safety	732
Department of Justice	1,633
Department for Regional Development	2,279
Department for Social Development	7,458
Public Prosecution Service for Northern Ireland (non-ministerial)	470
Northern Ireland Civil Service	25,847

Other major public sector employers included National Health Service trusts (68,263), schools, colleges and education and library boards (65,514), local government (12,134) and the Police Service of Northern Ireland (10,542). The public sector constituted 31.3% of the region's workforce.

In July 2024, the Northern Ireland Civil Service employed 24,106 staff with the breakdown by department was as follows:

Department	Employment
The Executive Office (TEO)	437
Department of Agriculture, Environment and Rural Affairs (DAERA)	3,445
Department for Communities (DfC)	7,408
Department of Education (DE)	526
Department for the Economy (DfE)	1,279
Department of Finance (DoF)	3,498
Department of Health (DoH)	621
Department for Infrastructure (DfI)	2,915
Department of Justice (DoJ)	3,413
Public Prosecution Service for Northern Ireland (PPSNI) (non-ministerial)	440
Northern Ireland Civil Service	24,106

== Ethics and accountability ==
The Civil Service Commissioners for Northern Ireland are not civil servants and are independent of the Executive. The commissioners are responsible for ensuring that appointments to the Northern Ireland Civil Service are made on merit on the basis of fair and open competition; they also have a role in hearing appeals made by existing civil servants under the Northern Ireland Civil Service's Code of Ethics.

Under the Code of Ethics, each civil servant is expected to carry out his or her role with dedication and a commitment to the Civil Service and its core values: integrity, honesty, objectivity and impartiality, defined as follows.

- Integrity – putting the obligations of public service above your own personal interests
- Honesty – being truthful and open
- Objectivity – basing your advice and decisions on rigorous analysis of the evidence
- Impartiality – acting solely according to the merits of the case and serving equally well ministers of different political persuasions

The code also outlines the standards of behaviour expected in carrying out the role in accordance with each of those values.

== Organisation ==
There are three staff groups within the Northern Ireland Civil Service: Senior Civil Service, Non Industrial, and Industrial. The Senior Civil Service has four grades:

- Grade 5 – normally the head of a division (possibly managing several different branches)
- Grade 3 – head of a directorate or executive agency
- Permanent Secretary – head of the department or Government Legal Services
- Head of Service – Head of the Northern Ireland Civil Service

The Non Industrial staff group is split into the following eight grades:

- Administrative Assistant
- Administrative Officer
- Executive Officer II
- Executive Officer I
- Staff Officer
- Deputy Principal
- Grade 7
- Grade 6

Each grade has a number of different disciplines (e.g. General Service, Professional & Technical etc.). Civil servants in the Industrial staff group have many different grades that are split into pay groups for undertaking similar types of work e.g. road workers in the Department for Infrastructure or craft grades in DAERA.

== Current Leadership ==
Head of the Northern Ireland Civil Service and Secretary to the Northern Ireland Executive: Jayne Brady

Permanent Secretary for The Executive Office (TEO): David Malcolm

Deputy Secretary, Executive & Central Advisory Division on the Northern Ireland Civil Service Board: Chris Stewart
