= Tom Caldwell =

Tom Caldwell (30 June 1921 – 13 November 2002) was a politician, art dealer and interior designer in Northern Ireland.

Born in Uganda, Caldwell moved to Belfast at the age of three. He studied at the Royal Belfast Academical Institution, then in 1941 joined the Royal Inniskilling Fusiliers. This was followed by four years as an officer in the British Indian Army.

In 1954, Caldwell inherited the family furniture business and began promoting contemporary design. In 1962, he first became involved in politics, asking Prime Minister of Northern Ireland Basil Brooke to formally thank Roman Catholics for not supporting the Irish Republican Army (IRA)'s Border Campaign. In 1964, he was appointed interior designer to the Duke of Westminster. In 1969, he opened an art gallery in Belfast to promote local artists.

Caldwell accepted a late offer to contest Belfast Willowfield at the 1969 Northern Ireland general election as an unofficial Unionist supporter of former Ulster Unionist Party Prime Minister Terence O'Neill. He spent his time in Parliament urging discussions with the IRA and initiated contact with them in 1972. At a meeting in Dublin, he asked them to avoid "soft targets".

Caldwell stood unsuccessfully as an independent Unionist in South Antrim at the 1970 general election, taking 11.2% of the votes cast. The Parliament of Northern Ireland was suspended in 1972 and abolished the following year. Caldwell joined the Alliance Party of Northern Ireland, but the new party did not give him a candidacy at the 1973 Northern Ireland Assembly election, and he resigned the following year.

In 1974, Caldwell opened a second art gallery, this time in Dublin. In 1976, he debated Sean Hopkins, an IRA fundraiser, in the United States, leading to Hopkins's deportation. He became a regular speaker in the U.S. and an opponent of Bill Clinton's policy on Northern Ireland.

Parliament of Northern Ireland
Preceded by William Hinds	Member of Parliament for Belfast Willowfield; 1969–1973	Parliament abolished
