= Committee for the Environment =

Northern Ireland Assembly committee

The Committee for the Environment was a Northern Ireland Assembly committee established to advise, assist and scrutinise the work of the Department of the Environment and Minister of the Environment. The committee also played a key role in the consultation, consideration and development of new legislation.

The committee was abolished in 2016 because the Department of Environment was closed and its mandate was transferred to other departments.

== Membership ==
Membership of the committee before the closure of the DoE:

Party	Member
Alliance	David Ford
DUP	Trevor Clarke
DUP	Ian McCrea
DUP	Alastair Ross
DUP	Peter Weir
Sinn Féin	Cathal Boylan (deputy chairperson)
Sinn Féin	Daithí McKay
SDLP	Tommy Gallagher
SDLP	Patsy McGlone (chairperson)
UUP	David McClarty
UUP	Roy Beggs

== See also ==
- Committee
