= John Laird, Baron Laird =

Northern Irish politician and life peer

The Right Honourable The Lord Laird
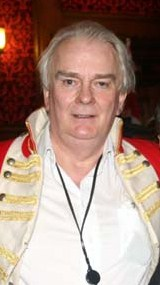

Member of the House of Lords
- Lord Temporal
- Life peerage 16 July 1999 – 10 July 2018

Constitutional Convention Member for West Belfast
- In office 1975–1976
- Preceded by: New convention
- Succeeded by: Convention dissolved

Member of the Northern Ireland Assembly for West Belfast
- In office 28 June 1973 – 1974
- Preceded by: New assembly
- Succeeded by: Assembly abolished

Member of the Northern Ireland Parliament for Belfast St Anne's
- In office 12 November 1970 – 31 March 1972
- Preceded by: Norman Laird
- Succeeded by: Parliament suspended

Personal details
- Born: John Dunn Laird; 23 April 1944 Belfast, Northern Ireland
- Died: 10 July 2018 (aged 74) Belfast, Northern Ireland
- Party: Independent
- Other political affiliations: Ulster Unionist Party (until 2013)
- Occupation: Politician
- Website: www.lordlaird.co.uk

John Dunn Laird, Baron Laird, FRSA, of Artigarvan (23 April 1944 – 10 July 2018) was a Northern Irish politician, life peer and former chairman of the cross-border Ulster-Scots Agency. In 2013 Laird allegedly offered to lobby for a firm against parliamentary rules. Consequently, he resigned from the Ulster Unionist Party.

== Career ==
Whilst Chairman of the Ulster Young Unionist Council in 1970, Laird became the youngest member of the Parliament of Northern Ireland, after winning the seat of Belfast Saint Anne's in a by-election caused by the death of his father, Dr Norman Laird OBE.

He was expelled from the Ulster Unionist Parliamentary Party in January 1972 when he voted for a Democratic Unionist Party censure motion opposing a ban on certain processions planned for The Twelfth. He topped the poll in Belfast West in the 1973 Northern Ireland Assembly election opposed to the proposals of the former Prime Minister Brian Faulkner. He repeated this feat as an Ulster Unionist candidate in the 1975 Constitutional Convention election.

He established John Laird Public Relations in 1976, which, now called JPR, is Northern Ireland's longest established PR company still in existence.

He was created a life peer on 16 July 1999 as Baron Laird, of Artigarvan in the County of Tyrone.

Laird studied at the Royal Belfast Academical Institution.

== Ulster Scots ==
A proponent of Ulster Scots as a language, Lord Laird wanted road signs in Irish, English and Ullans on all roads in Ireland, as "parity of esteem" as signed up for under the Good Friday Agreement. Similarly, he said that the Garda Síochána should be renamed to An Garda Síochána/Hannin Polis. Laird served as head of the Ulster-Scots Agency, before resigning in April 2004, in protest at a cut in government funding for the agency.

Lord Laird found himself at the centre of a minor scandal in 2005, when it was revealed that while chairman of the Ulster-Scots agency, Laird had spent in excess of £2500 of public money on taxis between Belfast and Dublin.

== House of Lords ==
Laird sat in the House of Lords as an independent. Laird used parliamentary privilege to speak out against the Irish Republican Army (IRA) in the House of Lords. In May 2005 he claimed that Phil Flynn, an advisor to the Taoiseach, Bertie Ahern, was active in the IRA. In December that year he said that there were 200 IRA "sleepers" in high places in the Republic of Ireland. In November 2007 he again used parliamentary privilege to name senior IRA members who he said were responsible for the murder of south Armagh man Paul Quinn in October.

=== Investigation into "paid advocacy" and suspension ===
In June 2013, following investigations by undercover reporters from the Sunday Times, The Telegraph, and the BBC, in which he was filmed agreeing to arrange for questions to be raised in Parliament in exchange for a monthly retainer of £2,000, Laird relinquished the Ulster Unionist Party whip and referred himself to the House of Lords Commissioner for Standards.

On 18 December 2013, the ruling by the Lords Committee for Privileges and Conduct resulted in a four-month suspension House of Lords.

=== Expenses ===
Laird claimed parliamentary expenses of £73,000 in 2008/09, making him the most expensive peer in the House of Lords for that parliamentary year.

== 2007 election: Donegal ==
In December 2006 Laird announced plans to stand in Donegal North-East and Donegal South-West on what he termed a radical Ulster-Scots ticket. He said he intended to use the publicity platform of his candidacy to highlight what he called the double standards of the Irish Government in relation to the Ulster-Scots movement. However, after suffering a mild heart attack he did not stand.

== Publications ==
The following is a list of books, plays, and films for which Lord John Laird has been responsible:

- Videos Trolleybus Days in Belfast (1992)
- Swansong of Steam in Ulster (1993)
- Waterloo Sunset (1994)
- Rails on the Isle of Wight (1994)
- The Twilight of Steam in Ulster (1994)
- A Struggle to be Heard – by a True Ulster Liberal (2010)

== Arms ==
Coat of arms of John Laird, Baron Laird

Crest
A cat statant guardant Gules clasping in the dexter forepaw a thistle slipped and leaved Proper.
Escutcheon
Argent two bars wavy Vert between six sinister hands couped at the wrist appaumy three two and one Gules.
Supporters
Dexter a sea pegasus Gules maned unguled and with a tail fin and supporting with the exterior hoof a wheel Argent sinister a sea pegagus Argent maned unguled and with a tail fin and supporting with the exterior hoof a wheel Gules.
Motto
Forrits Wi Jonick

== See also ==
- List of Northern Ireland Members of the House of Lords

Parliament of Northern Ireland
Preceded by Norman Laird	Member of Parliament for Belfast St Anne's; 1970–1973	Parliament abolished
Northern Ireland Assembly (1973)
New assembly	Assembly Member for West Belfast; 1973–1974	Assembly abolished
Northern Ireland Constitutional Convention
New convention	Member for West Belfast; 1975–1976	Convention dissolved
