= Permanent Secretary to the Welsh Government =

Top civil servant in Wales

Permanent Secretary to the Wesh Government
- Ysgrifennydd Parhaol Llywodraeth Cymru (Welsh)
- Incumbent; Andrew Goodall since 9 September 2021
- Welsh Government; Welsh Cabinet
- Seat: Crown Buildings, Cathays Park, Cardiff
- Appointer: First Minister of Wales
- Term length: At the First Minister's pleasure
- Formation: 1998
- Salary: £215,000–£220,000 per annum

The Permanent Secretary to the Welsh Government (Welsh: Ysgrifennydd Parhaol Llywodraeth Cymru) is the most senior civil servant in Wales who leads more than 6,000 staff within the Welsh Government.

== Role ==
The office holder is additionally responsible for ensuring that the government's money and resources are used effectively and properly. The role is currently occupied by Andrew Goodall, who was appointed in September 2021 by the then First Minister Mark Drakeford, with the agreement of the Cabinet Secretary, Simon Case.

== Duties of office ==
The Permanent Secretary to the Welsh Government is directly responsible for more than 6,000 civil servants in Wales. The Permanent Secretary leads the Welsh Government civil service, ensuring it delivers the full range of devolved powers and duties that the Senedd has sole responsibility for as outlined in the Government of Wales Acts of 1998 and 2006 and the Wales Acts of 2014 and 2017. The office holder is the principal accountable officer for the Welsh Government, and as such they are primarily responsible to the Senedd for the exercise of the responsibilities held whilst in office. Such responsibilities includes the management of the Welsh Government's budget and the economic, efficient and effective use of Welsh Government resources.

As well as heading the civil service, the Permanent Secretary to the Welsh Government supports the development, implementation and communication of all government policies. The Permanent Secretary is currently restructuring the Welsh Government civil service to be aligned to ministerial organisation.

The Permanent Secretary to the Welsh Government liaises with colleagues across the United Kingdom, including the Scottish Government, Northern Ireland Executive and HM Government, in order to support, engage and invest in the talent and leadership of the UK Civil Service as well as wider public services.

== See also ==
- Civil Service (United Kingdom)
- Welsh Government
- Permanent Secretary to the Scottish Government
- Head of the Northern Ireland Civil Service
- Cabinet Secretary (United Kingdom)
