= James Hanna McCormick =

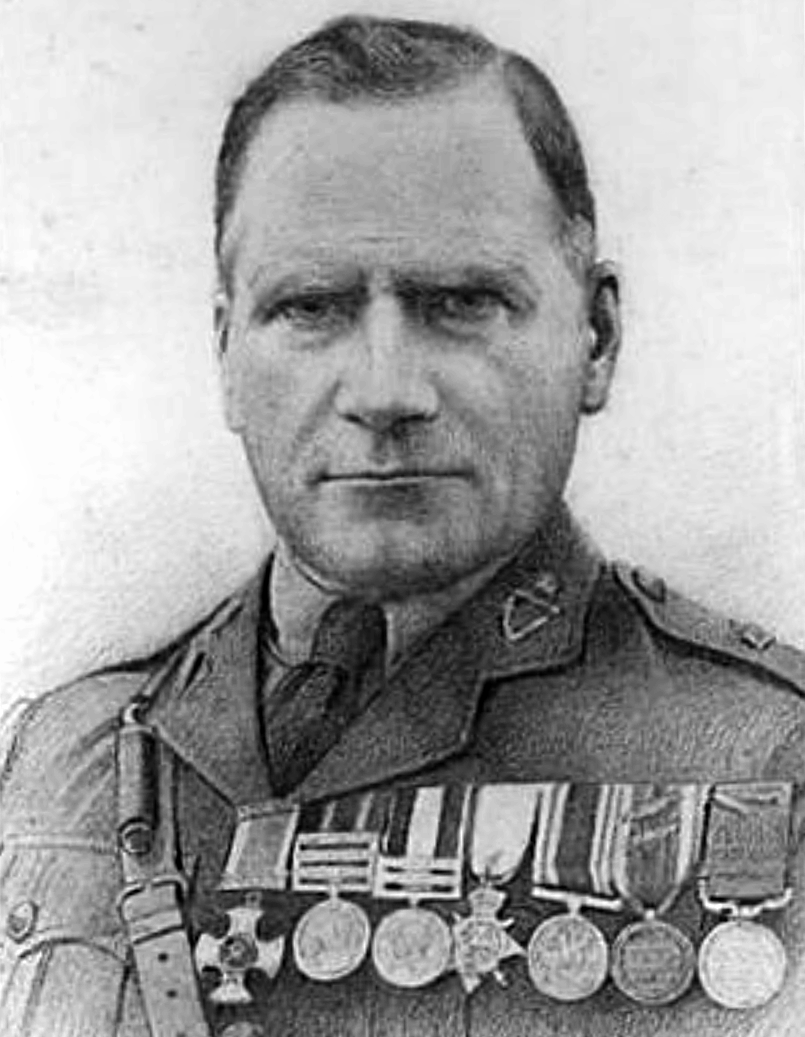

Member of the Northern Ireland Parliament for Belfast, St Anne's
- In office 1929–1938
- Preceded by: Constituency created
- Succeeded by: Edmond Warnock

Personal details
- Born: 20 September 1875 Belfast, Ireland
- Died: 4 May 1955 (aged 79) Belfast, Northern Ireland
- Party: Ulster Unionist Party
- Spouse: Evelyn Campbell (m. 1922)
- Children: William McCormick; Campbell McCormick
- Profession: Soldier

Lieutenant Colonel (Note: McCormick was varyingly described as either "Major" or "Lieutenant Colonel" during his political career.) James Hanna McCormick, DSO (September 1875 – May 1955) was a professional soldier and Ulster Unionist Party politician.

== Early life ==
McCormick was born in Belfast, Ireland to Thomas McCormick and Elizabeth Hanna McCormick. He self-described his religion as "Irish Protestant".

He moved to Canada in 1903, to take part in the colonisation of Lloydminster, Saskatchewan.

By 1909, he had become the deputy mayor of Lloydminster, where he also owned 1,200 acres of land and worked as an estate auctioneer.

== Military career ==
=== Early career ===
McCormick served in the Boer War in the Imperial Yeomanry, and later joined the 22nd Saskatchewan Light Horse of the Canadian militia.

=== First World War ===
At the outbreak of the First World War, McCormick enlisted as a commissioned officer in the Canadian Expeditionary Force. As the deputy sheriff of Saskatchewan, he raised a band of men at his own expense - the Corps of Western Canadian Cowboys, nicknamed "McCormick's Devils". They joined the 197th Battalion (later absorbed into the 11th Battalion) and crossed the Atlantic in January 1917.

In August 1917, he led the 17th (City of Winnipeg) Battalion during the final assault on Lens. He won the Distinguished Service Order medal for his actions at Vimy Ridge. He had been recommended for the Victoria Cross and was wounded five times throughout the war.

He returned to Canada in October 1919.

== Political career ==
After the war, McCormick returned to Belfast to pursue a political career in the newly partitioned government of Northern Ireland.

He was the chairman of the Court of Appeal from 1921 to 1924, and of the appeal courts of the Ministry of Labour from 1928 to 1929.

=== Member of Parliament ===
In 1929, McCormick campaigned as the Ulster Unionist Party candidate for Belfast St Anne's in the Northern Ireland House of Commons. Following a successful campaign, he became the new constituency's first member of parliament.

==== Anti-Catholicism ====
Despite his senior position in the UUP, he became a leading member of the controversial anti-Catholic Ulster Protestant League during its formation in 1931. He also travelled to Scotland to speak on behalf of its sister organisation, the Scottish Protestant League.

In 1933, he complained about Protestants giving jobs to Catholics, accusing those that did of being "traitors" to their country.

McCormick was also alarmed at the rate of population growth of the Catholic demographic. At an Orangemen rally, he proclaimed that some Protestant majorities had become minorities, saying that could lead to the Catholic Church being in power.

==== Shooting ====
In October 1933, McCormick was attacked by two assailants outside his home. After defending himself with his walking stick, he was shot in the arm. The press linked the incident to Irish republicanism, of which McCormick was a well-known opponent.

== Later life ==
In 1938, at the end of his second term, McCormick retired from political office.

He renamed his house to Vimy, after the battle in which he was decorated for gallantry.

He was nominated as an independent unionist candidate for Belfast West in the 1950 UK general election, but the seat was won by James Godfrey MacManaway of the UUP. In a column for the Londonderry Sentinel, MacManaway accused McCormick of splitting the vote, saying he wasn't a unionist "of any kind".

McCormick continued to reside in Northern Ireland until his death in 1955.

== Publications ==
McCormick authored two books about the colonisation of Saskatchewan:

- The Greater Saskatchewan (1910)
- Lloydminster, or 5,000 miles with the Barr Colonists (1924)

== Notes ==
Parliament of Northern Ireland
New constituency	Member of Parliament for Belfast, St Anne's; 1929–1938	Succeeded by Edmond Warnock
