= David Sterling =

Northern Irish civil servant

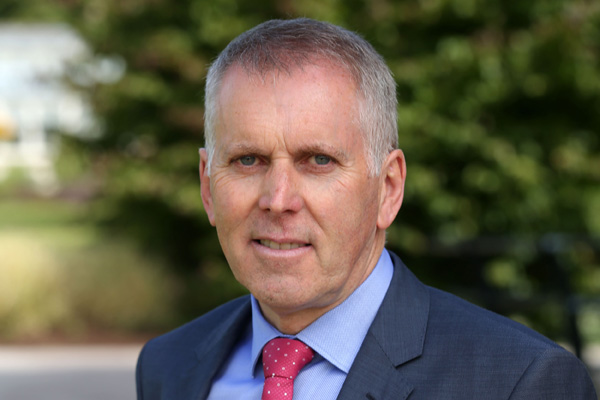
Sir David Sterling

Sir David Robert Sterling KCB (born 7 March 1958) is a Northern Irish civil servant. Since 2017, he was the Interim Head of the Northern Ireland Civil Service, Permanent Secretary of the Executive Office, and Secretary to Northern Ireland Executive: as such, he was the most senior civil servant in Northern Ireland. He was appointed Knight Commander of the Order of the Bath (KCB) in the 2020 Birthday Honours. He stepped down as Head of the Northern Ireland Civil Service on 31 August 2020, after 42 years as a civil servant. He is a keen golfer who plays at Malone Golf Club, Belfast.

In 2024, he was made a member of the Royal Irish Academy.

Government offices
Preceded by Sir Malcolm McKibbin	Interim Head of the Northern Ireland Civil Service; 2017 to 2020	Succeeded by Jenny Pyper
