= William May (Northern Ireland politician) =

Northern Ireland politician (1909–1962)

William Morrison May (8 April 1909 – 2 March 1962) was a unionist politician in Northern Ireland.

May was born in Letterkenny, County Donegal, the son of William May JP, and educated at Methodist College, Belfast. In 1934 he married Olive Muriel Dickinson and had one son and two daughters - Jennifer married, firstly, Thomas Byng, the future Earl of Strafford and, subsequently, Sir Christopher Bland, Chairman of British Telecom. He served in the Royal Auxiliary Air Force from 1936–39 and in the Royal Air Force from 1939-45 as a Wing Commander.

May was a chartered accountant in the firm of Quin, Knox and Co. During the Second World War he served in the RAF and was a Member of Lloyd's from 1954.

At the 1949 Northern Ireland general election, he was elected as the Ulster Unionist Party MP for Ards. He was appointed Minister for Education in 1957, also being raised to the Privy Council (Northern Ireland).

May died at his home, Mertoun Hall, Holywood, County Down in 1962.

Parliament of Northern Ireland
Preceded by Robert Perceval-Maxwell	Member of Parliament for Ards; 1949–1962	Succeeded by William Long
Political offices
Preceded by Harry Midgley	Minister of Education; 1957–1962	Succeeded by Ivan Neill
