= Roland Nugent =

Northern Irish politician

Sir Roland Thomas Nugent, 1st Baronet (19 June 1886 – 18 August 1962) was an Ulster Unionist Party politician from Northern Ireland. He was a member of the Senate of Northern Ireland from 1936 until his resignation in 1961. He served as Deputy Speaker (1938–1939 and 1944), Leader (1944–1950) and Speaker (1950–1961).

== Life ==
Born in Portaferry, County Down, Nugent studied at Eton College, Trinity College, Cambridge, and the University of Bonn. He joined the diplomatic service in 1910, transferring to the Foreign Office in 1913. During World War I, he served with the Grenadier Guards.

He was director of the Federation of British Industries 1916–17 and 1919–32.

Having been knighted in the 1929 Birthday Honours, Nugent was created a baronet in the 1961 Birthday Honours.

== Family ==
Nugent married Cynthia Maud Ramsden, daughter of Captain Frederick William Ramsden and Lady Elizabeth Maud Conyngham (the daughter of The 3rd Marquess Conyngham) on 25 September 1917. The couple had three children; both his sons were killed in action in World War II:

- Elizabeth Anne Nugent (born 10 March 1919)
- Lieutenant Patrick Edmund Charles Nugent (4 November 1920 – 27 April 1943)
- Lieutenant John Andrew Nugent (1 September 1925 – 5 October 1944)

Political offices
Preceded by 6th Viscount Bangor	Speaker of the Senate of Northern Ireland; 1950–1961	Succeeded by Alexander Gordon
Preceded by Sir Basil Brooke	Minister of Commerce and Production; 1945–1949	Succeeded by Brian Maginess
Honorary titles
Preceded by The Earl of Kilmorey	Lord Lieutenant of Down; 1959–1962	Succeeded by The Earl of Clanwilliam
Baronetage of the United Kingdom
New creation	Baronet (of Portaferry); 1961–1962	Extinct
