= Minister of Labour (Northern Ireland) =

The Minister of Labour for Northern Ireland was a member of the Executive Committee of the Privy Council of Northern Ireland (Cabinet) in the Parliament of Northern Ireland which governed Northern Ireland from 1921 to 1972. The post was retitled the Minister of Labour and National Insurance in 1949, and abolished in 1965.

#	Name	Took office	Prime Minister	Party
1.	J. M. Andrews	7 June 1921	Craig	UUP
2.	David Graham Shillington	21 April 1937	Craig	UUP
3.	John Fawcett Gordon	29 August 1938	Craig, Andrews	UUP
4.	William Grant	6 May 1943	Brookeborough	UUP
5.	Harry Midgley	31 May 1944	Brookeborough	Commonwealth Labour
6.	William Grant	17 July 1945	Brookeborough	UUP
7.	Brian Maginess	2 August 1945	Brookeborough	UUP
8.	William McCleery	12 April 1949	Brookeborough	UUP
9.	Harry Midgley	4 November 1949	Brookeborough	UUP
10.	Ivan Neill	12 January 1950	Brookeborough	UUP
11.	Herbert Kirk	12 March 1962	Brookeborough, O'Neill	UUP
12.	William James Morgan	22 July 1964	O'Neill	UUP

== Parliamentary Secretary to the Ministry of Home Affairs ==
- 1921 – 1938 John Fawcett Gordon
- 1938 – 1941 William Grant
