= Harry Midgley =

Northern Irish politician

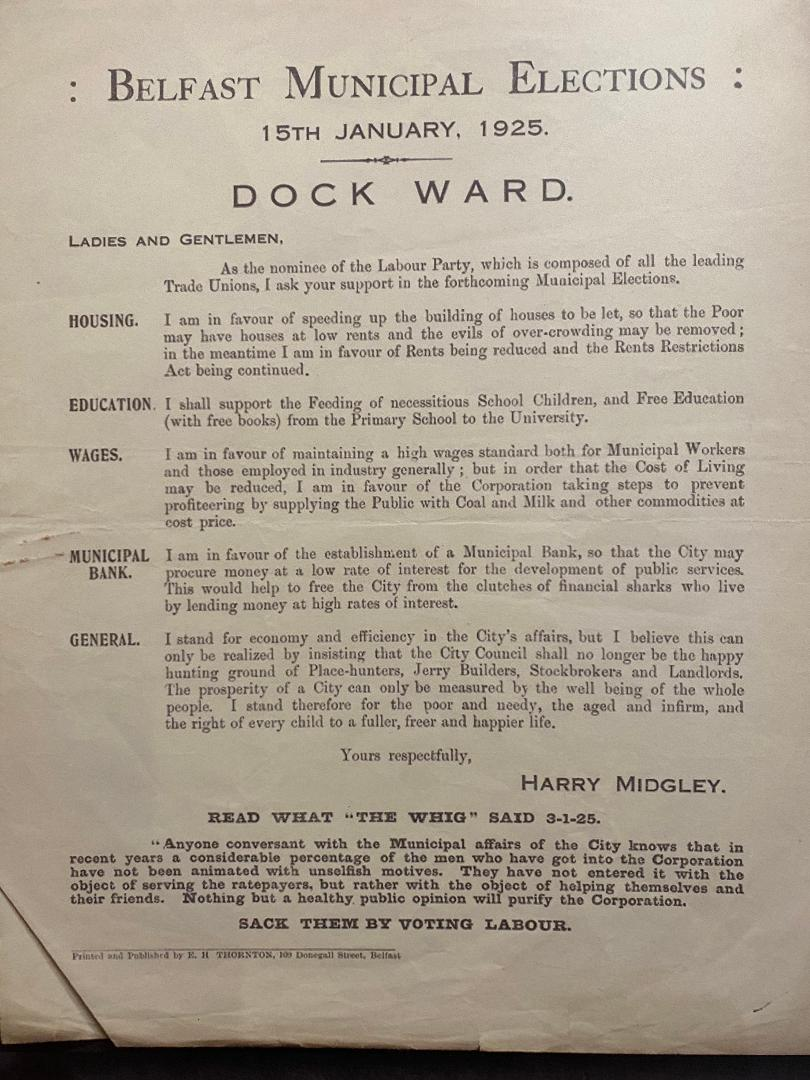
Harry Midgley Labour manifesto for the 1925 Belfast Municipal Election

Henry Cassidy Midgley, PC (NI), known as Harry Midgley (1893 – 29 April 1957) was a prominent trade-unionist and politician in Northern Ireland. Born to a working-class Protestant family in Tiger's Bay, north Belfast, he followed his father into the shipyard. After serving on the Western Front in the Great War, he became an official in a textile workers union and a leading light in the Belfast Labour Party (BLP). He represented the party's efforts in the early 1920s to provide a left opposition to the Unionist government of the new Northern Ireland while remaining non-committal on the divisive question of Irish partition.

From 1932 as secretary of the BLP's successor, the Northern Ireland Labour Party (NILP), he urged a closer relationship to British labour movement. Midgley's support for the Republic in the Spanish Civil War, and more broadly his criticism of Irish neutrality in the Second World War, antagonised Catholic voters and precipitated a split with party colleagues. At the end of 1942 Midgley formed the Commonwealth Labour Party and entered the Northern Ireland government first as Minister for Public Security and then as Minister for Labour. After the war, and as an Ulster Unionist, he served as Minister for Education overseeing the raising of the school leaving age to 15 and an expanded programme of school construction.

== Early political engagement ==
Midgley was third child and eldest son among two daughters and three sons of Alexander Midgley (1860–99), shipyard labourer, originally of Lurgan, Co. Armagh, and Elizabeth Midgley (née Cassidy; c.1862–1929), also of Lurgan. He left school at age twelve, and worked two years as a grocer's helper before following his father (who died when Midgley was just six) into the Workman & Clark shipyard apprenticing as a joiner.

He attended the Socialist Sunday School of the Independent Labour Party (ILP), and in 1907, aged fourteen, he debuted as a speaker at ILP Sunday meetings at Belfast's Custom House steps. That same year he canvassed for William Walker in his third unsuccessful parliamentary campaign in North Belfast. In the debates between Walker and James Connelly in 1911–12, Midgley had supported Connolly's separatist socialist republicanism.

Midgely also had the opportunity to meet and listen to the ILP leader Keir Hardie. In 1907, Hardie, who had been election agent for Walker in 1905, convened in Belfast the first conference of his new parliamentary-based Labour Party.

In 1912 Midgley emigrated to the USA where, working as a labourer, he joined the moderate American Federation of Labor.

== Wartime service and reflections ==
At home in Belfast on a visit at the outbreak of the First World War, Midgley enlisted and served in the 36th (Ulster) Division. Wounded and gassed, he believed that the revulsion throughout Europe to the horrors of the war would hasten the socialist revolution.

In "the heartfelt hope that out of the night of pain and sorrow, we shall emerge into the full light of a perfect day; a world set free from war", Midgely reflected on his wartime experience in a collection of poems, Thoughts from Flanders (1924). A testament to a shell-shocked comrade executed for desertion, these include "Shot at Dawn": "He was only a boy with golden hair / Scarce out of his teens, and yet / I know the men who served out there / 'His Murder' will not forget".

In 1919, Midgely returned to Belfast and got a job as an organiser with the Linenlappers' and Warehouse Workers Union, a position he was to hold until 1942. However, he baulked at the choice now presented by Hardie's party. In 1913, at the height of the Home Rule Crisis, British Labour had decided on a policy of deference to the Irish Labour Party, and of not standing their own candidates in Ireland . As the Irish party had emerged from the war aligned with Sinn Féin, this implied support for complete Irish secession and, Midgely believed, acceptance of the partition that must follow.

== Belfast, and Northern Ireland, Labour parties ==
In 1919, Midgley joined the Belfast Labour Party, and in 1920 he was elected with eleven other party candidates to Belfast City Council. Midgley highlighted the plight of unemployed ex-servicemen, hailed the revolutionary workers' uprisings in Russia and Germany, and urged municipalisation of distribution of essential commodities. At the same time, determined to avoid a partition that would sunder the labour movement in Ireland, Midgley and the BLP supported the policy that the new Sinn Féin majority in the south and west of Ireland had repudiated: all-Ireland home rule. When the expulsion of catholic workers from the shipyards by loyalist mobs was followed by similar attacks on leftist Protestants in July 1920, Midgley was among the trade-union leaders targeted for abuse.

At the time of the 1921 Northern Ireland general election, the first ever election to Northern Ireland's embryonic parliament, the "principal anxiety" of the Unionist Prime Minister James Craig was that the appeal of the BLP to working class Loyalists would split the unionist vote. When Midgely and three other anti-partitionist socialist candidates (their deposits paid by the British Labour Party, but also with covert funding from Sinn Féin) booked the Ulster Hall for a final rally, it was disrupted by 4000 loyalist shipyard workers accompanied by Orange bands. The protesters telegraphed Craig to inform him that they had "captured the Ulster Hall from Bolsheviks [James] Baird, Midgley and [John] Hanna". Craig responded: "...Well done big and wee yards". Midgley lost his bid to take the Belfast East seat.

In the 1923 UK general election, Midgely stood in Belfast West. In the absence of the nationalist Joseph Devlin, who was boycotting the northern parliament, Midgley won 47% of the vote, narrowly losing to the incumbent Unionist. His vote dropped to 40% in the 1924 UK general election as he tried to bridge the constituency's unionist-nationalist divide. In the constituency's Protestant ward of Shankhill Midgley emphasised his loyal wartime military service, while in the Catholic Falls area he attacked the policy of internment directed at Irish republicans. In 1925 he was returned to the Belfast City Council for Dock Ward on a platform that called for new housing and rent restrictions, and for free education. Midgley held his council seat until 1943, becoming an Alderman in 1929.

In September 1932, on the eve of demonstrations (and of running battles with the police) that saw Catholics and Protestants joining in protest against the government's Outdoor Relief policies of bare-subsistance rates and hard outdoor labour, Midgely challenged his fellow Docks councillor, Joseph Cunningham to an open electoral contest. Cunningham, a Unionist, whose claim that he was helping those on Outdoor Relief by supporting the employers' drive for a reduction in wages Midgely dismissed as "laughable", demurred. The invitation was the product, Cunningham suggested, of Midgely's "overweening vanity".

In the 1933 Northern Ireland parliamentary election, Midgley was elected for Belfast Dock, now representing the Northern Ireland Labour Party (NILP) formed by the BLP following the 1924 UK election. Like Midgley, the new party sought to bridge the unionist-nationalist divide, and embrace both Walkerite labour unionists and republican labour admirers of James Connolly. After taking his seat in the Stormont Parliament, Midgely was elected party secretary.

== Anti-Fascist ==
During the Spanish Civil War in the late 1930s, Midgley was outspoken in his support for the beleaguered Spanish Republic and described Franco as a "monstrosity" and a "killer of babies". In turn, Midgley became involved in a public controversy regarding The Irish News' attitude to the Spanish Civil War. The newspaper supported Francisco Franco's Nationalists, partly because of Spanish Republican anti-clericalism, while Midgley saw the Spanish Republican side as fighting a war against fascism and in defence of democracy.

Contesting the Dock constituency in the 1938 Northern Ireland election Midgley saw nationalist protest against his support for the Spanish Republic reduce his vote share to 24%. Night after night during the campaign there had been were violent clashes as Midgley faced hostile crowds shouting 'Up Franco', 'Remember Spain', and 'We want Franco'".

At the outbreak of war in 1939, as Midgley called for an all out effort to defeat Nazism. He not only antagonised the republican/nationalist wing of the party who, with the communist left, characterised the conflict as a conflagration between rival imperialisms. He also alarmed pro-war colleagues unwilling to join Unionists in waving the Union Jack.

== Commonwealth Labour Party ==
In 1941 Midgley made "a full blooded labour-unionist appeal" in a by-election for the Belfast Willowfield constituency. His victory in this strongly loyalist seat left J. M. Andrews, then Prime Minister of Northern Ireland, severely shaken. The Prime Minister later confided to Wilfrid Spender that "if there was a general election now the government would cease to have a majority". But for many within his own party, Midgley's willingness to "evangelise about the Union ran the risk of appearing to steal Unionists' clothes and was difficult to square with the oppositional role Labour occupied".

At the NILP annual conference in October 1942, Midgley used his address as chairman to assert that the NILP "is proud to associate with the labour movements of the British Commonwealth and, indeed, the United Nations, in their resolve to free the world from the barbarities, bestialities and injustices of Nazi-Fascist totalitarianism". He went to suggest that among those who continue to subscribe to "outworn nationalism" there were "quislings, if not actual agents of Nazism". The British Commonwealth", he added, "built up the finest system of social services in the world" (Midgley touted the social security system of New Zealand as second to none).

Jack Beattie (who been campaigning against the extension of conscription to Northern Ireland) disassociated himself from Midgley's views on the floor of the Northern Ireland House of Commons. When in December, the parliamentary NILP chose Beattie as their leader over Midgley, Midgley resigned the party whip, a departure followed by two party branches, Derry and North Belfast.

Midgley was later to attack Beattie in the Northern Ireland House of Commons. On 30 October 1945, he was excluded from the sitting for punching Beattie in what appeared to be a dispute over parliamentary procedure.

Midgley formed the Commonwealth Labour Party. In policy statement issued by the new party in January 1943, the CWLR committed itself to the consolidation of Northern Ireland within the United Kingdom and the British Commonwealth, and to the attainment of a system of social security and justice at par with the Labour's programme for Great Britain. The CWLR also adopted Clause Four of the British party's 1918 constitution:

To secure for the workers by hand or by brain the full fruits of their industry and the most equitable distribution thereof that may be possible upon the basis of the common ownership of the means of production, distribution and exchange, and the best obtainable system of popular administration and control of each industry or service.

Efforts to secure endorsements from British Labour leaders, however, came to nothing.

Although widely known as "Midgley party", the CWLP did build a number of constituency branches and at its height in 1943/44 might have had a membership of 800 to 1000. It represented a sufficiently significant development that when in May 1943, Basil Brooke wished to broaden the base of government and distinguish himself from the leadership of Andrews, discredited in the wake of the Belfast Blitz, he appointed Midgley as Minister of Public Security. Midgley also became a member of the Privy Council of Northern Ireland. While this was shock to many Unionists, Brooke was satisfied that on the Union and support for the war effort, Midgley was sound. The CLP committed itself to collaboration with the Government for the duration of the war. The first non-UUP Stormont minister, Midgley, who could present himself as one of the many thousands in Belfast who had lost their home to German bombs, tirelessly toured Northern Ireland working to maintain civilian morale and civil defence readiness.

In a cabinet reshuffle in June 1944, Midgley became Minister of Labour. Concerned that immigrants from the south would "gravitate to the disloyal element in our population", he enacted a policy of granting the necessary residence permits only when warranted by the labour situation.

In the 1945 Northern Ireland general election, Midgley was the Commonwealth Labour Party's only successful candidate. In the UK general election later that year, he was held at 30% of the vote in Belfast South by a hardening Ulster Unionist opposition. Brooke did not reappoint Midgley. The CWLP, he suggested, was the thin edge of the wedge leading to "the broad edge of communism". The unionists believed they had reason for alarm: in the Stormont election, the CLPs six candidates, contributed 28,079 votes to a total combined vote of the various left-wing political parties of 125,869, compared to a unionist total of 178,662.

== Ulster Unionist ==
The only other electoral foray undertaken by the CLP was in the local elections of 1946, which saw it win several council seats, although only one—Midgley's—in Belfast. Midgley appealed to his Protestant working-class base by calling for a withdrawal of state support for Catholic schools on the "socialist" principle that child education should comprehensive and nondenominational. But at the same time, Midgley was producing statements critical of "state control for the sake of state control" and of "frivolous" strikes, and proposing that "modern conservatism" might be viewed as a dynamic force.

At the end of World War II, the Unionist Government under Basil Brooke (Lord Brookeborough) accepted an offer from London—understood as a reward for the province's wartime service—to match the parity in taxation between Northern Ireland and Great Britain with parity in the services delivered. Once the government began to deliver social policy under the terms of this arrangement, Midgley was professed himself reconciled.

In September 1947 Midgley resigned as chairman of the Commonwealth Labour Party and, followed by some, but not all members, joined the Ulster Unionists. He took the further step, de rigueur for Unionist ministers, of joining the Orange Order. In the election of 1949 Midgley was once again re-elected for the Willowfield Constituency. By doing so he performed a unique feat: he had been returned for the same constituency under three different party labels: Labour, Commonwealth Labour and Ulster Unionist. His success was rewarded by his appointment first as Minister of Labour and then in 1950 (to the dismay of department civil servants) he replaced the liberal Unionist, Colonel Hall Thompson, as Minister of Education.

After 1953, Midgley intensified the construction of new school buildings mandated by the 1947 Education Act, and in 1957 he raised the school leaving age to 15. As minister he also oversaw improvements in teacher training, provision of state scholarships, and education for disabled students.

As minister Midgley contended that thousands of Catholic parents would have liked to send their children to schools with children of other faiths, but that the "dictates of the Hierarchy of their Church" prevented the opportunity this presented for reconciliation.

Midgley's outspoken Unionism did not diminish over the years. In Portadown, in 1957, he said, "All the minority are traitors and have always been traitors to the government of Northern Ireland". Midgley died, while still in office, later that year.

While on military leave in Belfast in August 1918, Midgley had married Eleanor Adgey, also of north Belfast. They had two sons and two daughters.

== Linfield Club ==
Harry Midgley was involved in the management of Linfield Football Club and the reserve pitch beside Windsor Park, is named Midgley Park in his honour.

== Papers ==
The Public Records Office of Northern Ireland (PRONI) holds "around 2000 documents, newspaper cuttings, photographs 1916 to 1987, comprising the records of Harry Midgely, 1892 to 1957, Minister of Public Security in the Stormont war-time government, Minister of Labour in 1949 and Minister of Education in 1950".

Trade union offices
Preceded by S. Dobbin	Organising Secretary of the Irish Linen Lappers' and Warehouse Workers' Trade Union; 1919–1926	Position abolished
Parliament of Northern Ireland
Preceded by Charles Blakiston-Houston	Member of Parliament for Belfast Dock; 1933–1938	Succeeded by George Anthony Clark
Preceded by Arthur Black	Member of Parliament for Belfast Willowfield; 1941–1957	Succeeded by William Hinds
Party political offices
Preceded by Jack Beattie	Leader of the Northern Ireland Labour Party at Stormont; 1933–1938	Succeeded by Paddy Agnew
Preceded by Hugh Gemmell	Chair of the Northern Ireland Labour Party; 1932–1942	Succeeded by Jack Beattie
Political offices
Preceded by William Grant	Minister of Public Security; 1943–44	Office abolished
Preceded by William Grant	Minister of Labour; 1944–45	Succeeded by William Grant
Preceded by William McCleery	Minister of Labour and National Insurance; 1949–50	Succeeded by Ivan Neill
Preceded by Samuel Hall-Thompson	Minister of Education; 1950–57	Succeeded by William May
