= Howard H. Stevenson =

American academic (1941–2026)

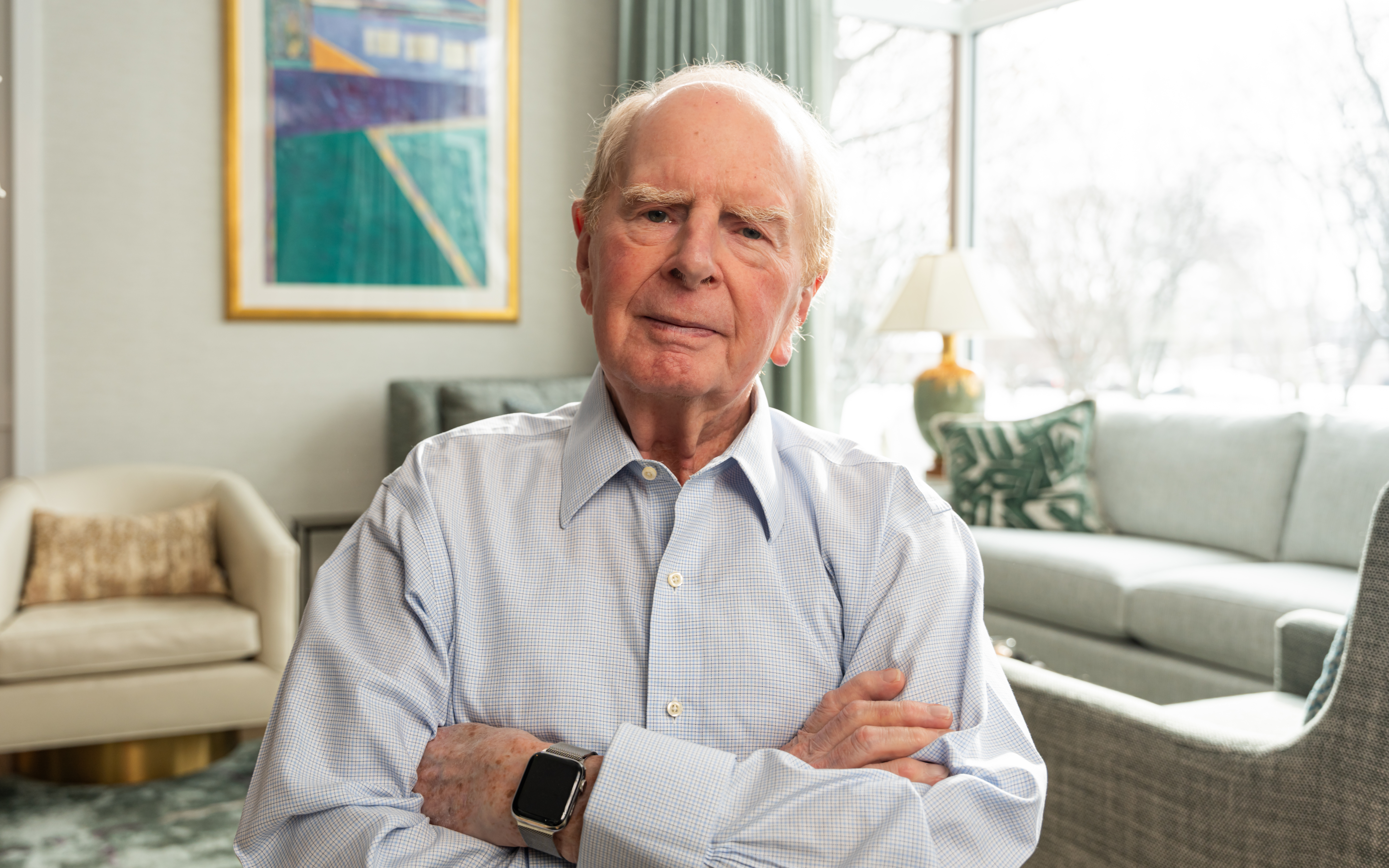
Howard Stevenson (c. 2012)

Howard H. Stevenson (June 27, 1941 – September 27, 2026) was an American academic who was the Sarofim-Rock Baker Foundation Professor Emeritus at Harvard University. He began teaching entrepreneurship at Harvard Business School in 1982 and held a variety of academic and leadership positions at HBS and Harvard University until his retirement in 2011.

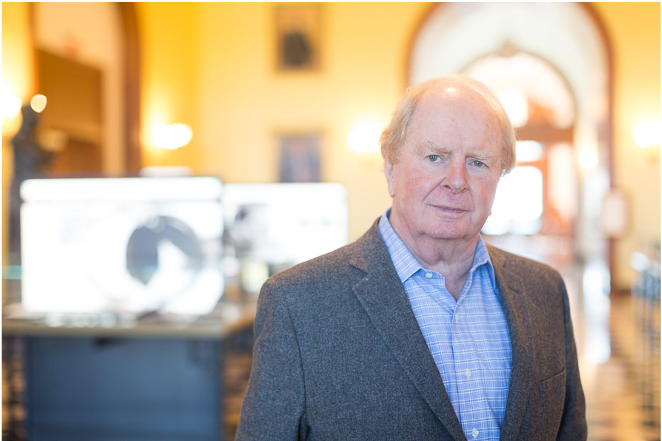
Howard H. Stevenson at Harvard Business School

Forbes described Howard as Harvard Business School's "lion of entrepreneurship" in a 2011 article. He is credited with defining entrepreneurship as "the pursuit of opportunity beyond the resources you currently control." INC described Howard's definition of entrepreneurship as "the best answer ever."

Stevenson was the author of eight books and 41 articles. His past roles at Harvard include chairman of Harvard Business Publishing, vice provost for resources and planning, and senior associate dean at HBS. He is often credited as being the most successful fundraiser in the history of Harvard University, raising over $600 million in philanthropic support for initiatives in business, science, healthcare, and student life.

He was the co-founder and founding president of Baupost Group, a money management firm currently led by Seth Klarman. When he retired from active teaching at HBS, the university named an academic chair in his honor.

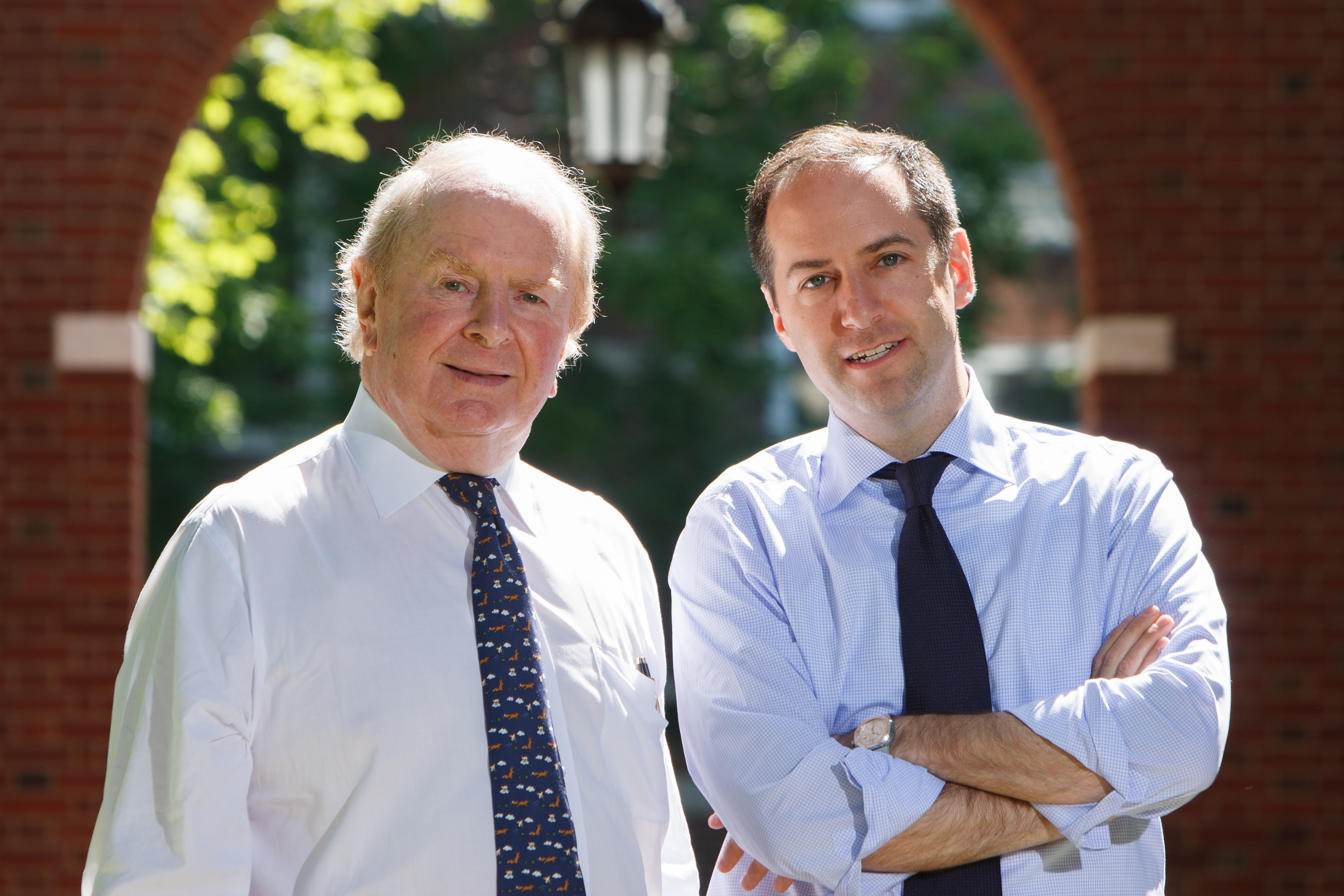
Howard H. Stevenson and Eric Sinoway on the HBS Campus

He graduated from Stanford University and Harvard Business School.

Stevenson died on September 27, 2026, at the age of 85.
