= Department of the Environment (Northern Ireland) =

Defunct Northern Irish government department

Department overview
- Formed: Unknown (on or before 1 January 1974)
- Preceding Department: Ministry of Development
- Dissolved: 6 May 2016
- Jurisdiction: Northern Ireland
- Headquarters: Clarence Court, 10–18 Adelaide Street, Belfast, BT2 8GB
- Employees: 2,681 (September 2011)
- Annual budget: £127.0 million (current) & £5.1 million (capital) for 2011–12
- Website: www.doeni.gov.uk

The Department of the Environment (DOE or DOENI; Irish: An Roinn Comhshaoil; Ulster-Scots: Männystrie o tha Kintraside) was a devolved Northern Irish government department in the Northern Ireland Executive. The Minister for the Environment was overall responsible for the department.

== Aim ==
The DOE's overall aim was to "work in partnership" with the public, private and voluntary sectors to promote the "economic and social welfare of the community" through "promoting sustainable development and seeking to secure a better and safer environment for everyone".

The last Minister was Mark H. Durkan (Social Democratic and Labour Party).

== Responsibilities ==
The main policy responsibilities of the department were:

- the natural environment
- the built environment
- land use planning
- road safety
- regulation of drivers, vehicles and vehicle operators
- local government

The DOE's main counterparts in the United Kingdom Government were:

- the Department for Environment, Food and Rural Affairs (Defra);
- the Department for Communities and Local Government;
- the Department for Transport;
- the Department for Culture, Media and Sport (on built heritage).

In the Irish Government, its main counterparts were:

- the Department of the Environment, Community and Local Government; and
- the Department of Transport, Tourism and Sport.

== History ==
The Ministry of Home Affairs was established on the formation of Northern Ireland in June 1921 and was responsible for a range of non-economic domestic matters, including local government. A separate Ministry of Health and Local Government was formed in 1944 and split in 1965 to create the Ministry of Development. An environment ministry existed in the 1974 Northern Ireland Executive, and the ministry was known as the Department of the Environment under direct rule.

The DoE is still used in everyday language in Northern Ireland to describe the Roads Service, which was once run by the department but is currently an agency of the separate Department for Regional Development.

Following a referendum on the Belfast Agreement on 23 May 1998 and the granting of royal assent to the Northern Ireland Act 1998 on 19 November 1998, a Northern Ireland Assembly and Northern Ireland Executive were established by the United Kingdom Government under Prime Minister Tony Blair. The process was known as devolution and was set up to return devolved legislative powers to Northern Ireland. DoE was one of the six direct rule Northern Ireland departments that continued in existence after devolution in December 1999 by the Northern Ireland Act 1998 and The Departments (Northern Ireland) Order 1999.

A devolved minister first took office on 2 December 1999. Devolution was suspended for four periods, during which the department came under the responsibility of direct rule ministers from the Northern Ireland Office:

- between 12 February 2000 and 30 May 2000;
- on 11 August 2001;
- on 22 September 2001;
- between 15 October 2002 and 8 May 2007.

== Ministers of the Environment ==
Minister	Image	Party	Took office	Left office
Sam Foster		UUP	29 November 1999	11 February 2000
Office suspended
Sam Foster		UUP	30 May 2000	20 February 2002
Dermot Nesbitt		UUP	20 February 2002	14 October 2002
Office suspended
Arlene Foster		DUP	8 May 2007	9 June 2008
Sammy Wilson		DUP	9 June 2008	2 July 2009
Edwin Poots		DUP	3 July 2009	4 May 2011
Alex Attwood		SDLP	16 May 2011	15 July 2013
Mark H. Durkan		SDLP	16 July 2013	30 March 2016
Office and department abolished

=== Direct rule ministers ===
During the periods of suspension, the following ministers of the Northern Ireland Office were responsible for the department:

- George Howarth (2000)
- Angela Smith (2002–05)
- Lord Rooker (2005–06)
- David Cairns (2006–07)

== See also ==
- Committee for the Environment
