= Commonwealth Labour Party =

- Leader: Harry Midgley
- Founded: 1942
- Dissolved: 1947
- Ideology: Unionism; Labourism
- Political position: Centre

The Commonwealth Labour Party (CWLP) was a minor political party in Northern Ireland. The party was founded in 1942 by Harry Midgley, former leader of the Northern Ireland Labour Party (NILP), in order to pursue his brand of labour unionism.

== Split with the Northern Ireland Labour Party ==
Midgley had adopted a position of unswerving loyalty to Britain during World War II, and was increasingly out-of-step with the majority in the NILP, who wished it to remain neutral on the constitutional question, and the nationalist minority in the party, which included his two parliamentary colleagues, Paddy Agnew and Jack Beattie. On 4 December 1942, Beattie was elected leader of the NILP group in Parliament, with Midgley as his deputy, and this was the final straw.

Midgley resigned from the NILP on 15 December, and was followed by the departure of the Londonderry and North Belfast branches of the party. Although his own Willowfield branch expressed its support, it did not disaffiliate. Although some of Midgley's opponents believed that he would join the Ulster Unionist Party (UUP), he instead announced the formation of the Commonwealth Labour Party, on 19 December. The new party first met in January 1943, and adopted all Midgley's positions. It attempted to make links with the British Labour Party, but was rebuffed. Later in the year, Milton Gordon led the Londonderry branch back into the NILP, having come to believe that the new party was harming the labour movement. No trade union branch ever affiliated.

== Organisation ==
The party created a newspaper, Justice, which was initially edited by Midgley's son, and maintained nine branches, three in Belfast and the others in predominantly unionist areas of Northern Ireland, and a total of somewhat fewer than 1,000 members. No longer in opposition to the UUP which dominated the legislature, Midgley accepted an offer of a ministerial post from new Prime Minister Basil Brooke. He used his position to champion the Beveridge Report and the welfare state of New Zealand. The party also supported the idea of a British Commonwealth, although it avoided the question of whether British colonies should become independent states.

== Electoral performance ==
The party stood six candidates in the 1945 Northern Ireland general election. Only Midgley was successful, although Albert McElroy came a close second in Ards.

Midgley also stood in Belfast South in the 1945 UK general election, but was defeated by the Ulster Unionist candidate. In September 1946, the party put up candidates in the local elections, winning seats in Bangor, Newtownards, Richhill and Ballymena, plus Midgley's seat in Belfast. Concerned by the improved performance of the NILP, the party sought to identify itself more closely with unionism, and appealed to the Orange Order to support its candidates. At the end of the year, Justice was replaced by a new journal, Commonwealth.

== Disbanding ==
Increasingly right-wing in his politics, Midgley devoted less time to the party. On 6 September 1947, he resigned as party chairman, joining the UUP two weeks later. The CWLP held a conference under the chairmanship of William Brisbane. However, the party disbanded before the end of the year, with McElroy and some supporters rejoining the NILP, and most other members either joining the UUP or moving away from party politics.
