= Minister of Agriculture (Northern Ireland) =

The Minister of Agriculture was a member of the Executive Committee of the Privy Council of Northern Ireland (Cabinet) in the Parliament of Northern Ireland which governed Northern Ireland from 1921 to 1972. The post was combined with that of the Minister of Commerce until 1925, and was later vacant for three short periods.

#	Name	Took office	Prime Minister	Party
1.	Sir Edward Archdale	7 June 1921	Craig	UUP
2.	Sir Basil Brooke	1 December 1933	Craigavon, Andrews	UUP
3.	Lord Glentoran	16 January 1941	Andrews, Brooke	UUP
4.	Robert Moore	6 May 1943	Brooke	UUP
	Vacant	1 September 1960	Brookeborough	N/A
5.	Harry West	17 October 1960	Brookeborough, O'Neill	UUP
	Vacant	26 April 1967	O'Neill	N/A
6.	James Chichester-Clark	5 May 1967	O'Neill	UUP
	Vacant	23 April 1969	O'Neill	N/A
7.	Phelim O'Neill	3 May 1969	Chichester-Clark	UUP
8.	Harry West	23 March 1971	Faulkner	UUP

== Parliamentary Secretary to the Ministry of Agriculture ==
- 1941 – 1943 Brian Maginess
- 1943 – 1956 vacant
- 1956 – 1958 John Bailey
- 1958 – 1960 Harry West
- 1960 – 1964 vacant
- 1964 – 1965 William Long

Office abolished 1965
