= Northern Ireland (Temporary Provisions) Act 1972 =

Act of the Parliament of the United Kingdom

Northern Ireland (Temporary Provisions) Act 1972 (Note: Section 3.)
- Act of Parliament
- Parliament of the United Kingdom
- Long title: An Act to make temporary provision for the government of Northern Ireland, and for purposes connected therewith.
- Citation: 1972 c. 22
- Territorial extent: United Kingdom

Dates
- Royal assent: 30 March 1972
- Commencement: 30 March 1972 (Note: The Acts of Parliament (Commencement) Act 1793.)
- Repealed: 2 December 1999 (Note: The Northern Ireland Act 1998 (Commencement No. 5) Order 1999 (SI 1999/3209).)
Other legislation
Amended by	Statute Law (Repeals) Act 1977
Repealed by	Northern Ireland Act 1998

Status: Repealed

Text of statute as originally enacted

Revised text of statute as amended

The Northern Ireland (Temporary Provisions) Act 1972 (c. 22) was an act of the Parliament of the United Kingdom that introduced direct rule in Northern Ireland with effect from 30 March 1972.

The act, which took effect immediately on receiving royal assent, provided as follows:

- A new Secretary of State for Northern Ireland was to take over the government functions of Northern Ireland's ceremonial Governor and its executive cabinet ministers, and heads of government departments
- The Attorney General for England and Wales was to take over the duties of the Attorney General for Northern Ireland.
- The Parliament of Northern Ireland was (in effect) indefinitely prorogued, with its legislative powers being made available for exercise by the British Government by Order in Council.

The political institutions that were put into abeyance by this Act were formally abolished the following year by the Northern Ireland Constitution Act 1973.

== Reaction ==
Prominent Northern Ireland MP, William Craig described the enactment of the legislation as "Ulster's El Alamein".

== Subsequent developments ==
The schedule to the act, except paragraphs 6(2) and 7, was repealed by section 1(1) of, and part XII of schedule 1 to, the Statute Law (Repeals) Act 1977, which came into force on 16 June 1977.
