= Minister of Commerce (Northern Ireland) =

The Minister of Commerce was a member of the Executive Committee of the Privy Council of Northern Ireland (Cabinet) in the Parliament of Northern Ireland which governed Northern Ireland from 1921 to 1972. The post was combined with that of the Minister of Agriculture until 1925. In 1943, it was renamed Minister of Commerce and Production and was combined with the post of Prime Minister of Northern Ireland until 1945, then with Leader of the Senate of Northern Ireland until 1949.

#	Name	Took office	Prime Minister	Party
1.	Edward Archdale	7 June 1921	Craig	UUP
2.	John Milne Barbour	16 April 1925	Craig, Andrews	UUP
3.	Sir Basil Brooke	16 January 1941	Andrews, Brookeborough	UUP
4.	Roland Nugent	16 February 1945	Brookeborough	UUP
5.	Brian Maginess	12 April 1949	Brookeborough	UUP
6.	William McCleery	4 November 1949	Brookeborough	UUP
7.	Daniel Dixon	26 October 1953	Brookeborough	UUP
8.	Jack Andrews	17 October 1961	Brookeborough	UUP
9.	Brian Faulkner	25 March 1963	O'Neill	UUP
10.	Roy Bradford	24 January 1969	O'Neill, Chichester-Clark	UUP
11.	Robin Bailie	23 March 1971	Faulkner	UUP

== Parliamentary Secretary to the Ministry of Commerce (and Production) ==
- 1921 – 1925 Robert McKeown
- 1925 – 1941 vacant
- 1941 – 1943 Sir Wilson Hungerford
- 1943 – 1945 Brian Maginess
- 1945 vacant
- 1945 – 1949 Robert Perceval-Maxwell
- 1949 - 1952 vacant
- 1952 – 1953 2nd Baron Glentoran
- 1953 - 1959 vacant
- 1959 – 1961 William Morgan
- 1961 vacant
- 1961 – 1965 William Fitzsimmons
- 1965 - 1969 vacant
- 1969 – 1971 John Brooke

Office abolished 1971
