= Government of Northern Ireland (1921–1972) =

Dissolved executive government

Executive Committee for Northern Ireland
- Arms of the Executive Committee

- Ulster Banner

Government overview
- Formed: 1922
- Dissolved: 1972
- Superseding Government: Northern Ireland Executive
- Jurisdiction: Northern Ireland
- Headquarters: Stormont Castle, Stormont Estate, Belfast, Northern Ireland
- Minister responsible: Prime Minister of Northern Ireland

The Executive Committee for Northern Ireland was the government of Northern Ireland created under the Government of Ireland Act 1920. Generally known as either the Cabinet or the Government, the executive committee existed from 1922 to 1972. It exercised executive authority formally vested in the British monarch in relation to devolved matters.

Under the Act as originally enacted, the "Executive Committee for Northern Ireland" was an executive committee of the Privy Council of Ireland consisting of the ministers appointed by the Lord Lieutenant of Ireland to head departments of state. Ministers so chosen did not have to be members of the Parliament of Northern Ireland but were required to become members within six months. The Irish Free State (Consequential Provisions) Act, which came into force in December 1922, replaced the Lord Lieutenant and Privy Council of Ireland with the Governor of Northern Ireland and Privy Council of Northern Ireland.

As in many Westminster-style systems, the Government of Ireland Act 1920 did not explicitly provide for such an office, but in practice the executive committee was headed by a Prime Minister of Northern Ireland. In theory the executive committee was not answerable to the House of Commons but held their positions "during the pleasure of the Lord Lieutenant". In practice the executive committee was answerable to the elected House of Commons of Northern Ireland. As a result, the executive committee stood in a similar relationship to the legislature and Crown (within devolved Northern Ireland) as the UK's Cabinet does to the Crown and Westminster Parliament. The executive committee thus played an equivalent constitutional role in relation to Northern Ireland as the UK Cabinet did to the United Kingdom as a whole.

The system of government created by the Government of Ireland Act 1920 was first suspended by the Northern Ireland (Temporary Provisions) Act 1972, and then abolished completely the following year by the Government of the United Kingdom under the Northern Ireland Constitution Act 1973.

The executive committee was based in the Stormont Parliament Buildings and the nearby Stormont Castle, whilst the Governor resided at Hillsborough Castle. Original plans to build a separate executive building were abandoned in the 1920s as a result of the economic difficulties that resulted from the Wall Street crash.

== Representation of women ==
From 1937 to 1944, Parker was Parliamentary Secretary (junior minister) to the Ministry of Education. One of her civil servants in that office, J.A. Oliver, described her as an "adroit politician and a formidable operator". She was the only woman to serve in the then cabinet of Northern Ireland (the Executive Committee of the Privy Council of Northern Ireland), as Minister of Health and Local Government from 1949 to 1957.

== Ministries ==
- Craigavon ministry – led by James Craig, 1st Viscount Craigavon – 1922–1940.
- Andrews ministry – led by J. M. Andrews – 1940–1943.
- Brookeborough ministry – led by Basil Brooke, 1st Viscount Brookeborough – 1943–1963.
- O'Neill ministry – led by Terence O'Neill – 1963–1969.
- Chichester-Clark ministry – led by James Chichester-Clark – 1969–1971.
- Faulkner ministry – led by Brian Faulkner – 1971–1972.

== Symbols ==
Ulster Banner, the Executive Committee's flag

Coat of arms of Northern Ireland, the Executive Committee's arms

== Sources ==
- McNamara, Maedhbh; Mooney, Paschal (2000). Women in Parliament: Ireland 1918–2000. Dublin: Wolfhound Press. ISBN 978-0-86327-759-7.
- Taillon, Ruth; Urquhart, Diane, eds. (2002). "Women, Politics and The State in Northern Ireland, 1918–66". The Field Day Anthology of Irish Writing. Vol. 5: Irish Women's Writings and Traditions. New York University Press. pp. 353–403. ISBN 978-0-8147-9907-9.
