= 1946 Down by-election =

UK parliamentary by-election

The 1946 Down by-election was held on 6 June 1946, following the death of James Little, the independent Unionist member of parliament for Down.

The Down constituency elected two members. Since its re-creation in 1922, it had consistently elected unionists, with all other candidates polling less than 15% of the votes cast.

Until the 1945, every MP for the seat had been a member of the Ulster Unionist Party (UUP). Little was elected unopposed for the UUP at a 1939 by-election. The other Down MP, Viscount Castlereagh, decided to retire at the 1945 general election, and the UUP decided to also make Little's seat subject to reselection. Little resigned from the party in protest at this, and easily held his seat as an Independent Ulster Unionist. Official Unionist Walter Smiles won the second seat, narrowly beating the second official Unionist, John Blakiston Houston and a second independent unionist, James Brown. Little took 40% of the votes, and the three other candidates around 20% each.

== Candidates ==
At the by-election, the Ulster Unionist Party hoped to regain the second seat. They stood C. H. Mullan, a lieutenant in the Royal Navy, who had unsuccessfully contested South Down at the 1945 Northern Ireland general election.

The Northern Ireland Labour Party had generally performed well at the 1945 election, although it did not win any seats. It stood Desmond Donnelly, a British politician with Irish ancestry. At the 1945 election, he had taken third place in Evesham standing for the Common Wealth Party, but had since joined the British Labour Party.

Two independent unionist candidates stood: J. Hastings-Little, son of James Little, and James Brown, the unsuccessful candidate from the previous year, and former Stormont MP for South Down.

== Result ==
The by-election was won by Mullan, who took more than half the votes cast. Donnelly took 29% and a clear second place, while Hastings-Little managed 17%. Brown's share of the vote collapsed to only 2%.

At the 1950 general election, all remaining multi-member constituencies were abolished. Down was divided into North Down and South Down. Mullan chose to stand down and pursued his career as a solicitor. Donnelly was elected MP for Pembrokeshire in 1950 and enjoyed a colourful career, eventually joining the Conservative Party.

Down by-election, 1946
Party	Candidate	Votes	%	±%
UUP	C. H. Mullan	50,699	51.4	+30.5
NI Labour	Desmond Donnelly	28,846	29.3	New
Ind. Unionist	J. Hastings-Little	16,895	17.1	−23.3
Ind. Unionist	James Brown	2,125	2.2	−16.9
Majority		21,853	22.1	N/A
Turnout		98,565		
UUP gain from Ind. Unionist		Swing		
