= Robert McBride (politician) =

Unionist politician in Northern Ireland (1856–1934)

Robert McBride (1856–26 November 1934) was a unionist politician in Northern Ireland.

== Biography ==
McBride worked as a farmer, and with textiles. He was also a lay preacher with the Church of Ireland. He joined the Ulster Unionist Party and was elected in Down at the 1921 Northern Ireland general election. He held the seat in 1925, and won West Down at the 1929 general election. He retired in 1933, but was elected to the Senate of Northern Ireland the following year, shortly before his death.

Parliament of Northern Ireland
New constituency	Member of Parliament for Down; 1921–1929; With: J. M. Andrews; James Craig; Éamon de Valera; Thomas Lavery; Thomas McMullan; Harry Mulholland; Patrick O'Neill	Constituency abolished
New constituency	Member of Parliament for West Down; 1929–1933	Succeeded by Samuel Fryar
