= 1939 Down by-election =

UK parliamentary by-election

The 1939 Down by-election was a parliamentary by-election held in the United Kingdom on 10 May 1939 for the House of Commons constituency of Down in Northern Ireland.

== Previous Result ==
General election 1935: Down
Party	Candidate	Votes	%	±%
UUP	David Reid	66,324	46.4	N/A
UUP	John Simms	58,777	43.5	N/A
Ind. Republican	Patrick O'Hagan	20,236	13.3	New
Majority		38,541	30.2	N/A
Turnout		145,337	56.7	N/A
UUP hold		Swing	N/A	
UUP hold		Swing	N/A	

== Result ==
James Little was elected unopposed as an Ulster Unionist.

== Aftermath ==
Little subsequently left the party in the run-up to the 1945 general election in a dispute over re-selection, stood and was re-elected as an Independent Unionist.

General election 1945: Down
Party	Candidate	Votes	%	±%
Ind. Unionist	James Little	46,732	40.4	N/A
UUP	Walter Smiles	24,148	20.9	−22.6
UUP	John Blakiston Houston	22,730	19.6	−26.8
Ind. Unionist	James Brown	22,163	19.1	New
Majority		24,002	20.8	N/A
Turnout		115,773	39.8	−16.9
Ind. Unionist gain from UUP		Swing	N/A	
UUP hold		Swing		
