= Sir Henry Mulholland, 1st Baronet =

Personal information
- Full name: Henry George Hill Mulholland
- Born: 20 December 1888; Ballywalter, Ireland
- Died: 5 March 1971 (aged 82); Bellaghy, Northern Ireland
- Batting: Right-handed
- Bowling: Right-arm slow
- Relatives: Godfrey Mulholland (brother)

Domestic team information
- Years: Team
- 1911–1914: Cambridge University
- 1911: Ireland

Career statistics
Competition	First-class
Matches	32
Runs scored	1,642
Batting average	30.40
100s/50s	4/9
Top score	153
Balls bowled	2,007
Wickets	51
Bowling average	23.86
5 wickets in innings	2
10 wickets in match	–
Best bowling	5/9
Catches/stumpings	37/–
- Source: Cricinfo, 3 January 2022

Sir Henry George Hill Mulholland, 1st Baronet, PC(NI), DL (20 December 1888 – 5 March 1971) was a Northern Ireland politician.

Mulholland was the third son of The 2nd Baron Dunleath and Norah Louisa Fanny Ward. He was educated at Eton and Trinity College, Cambridge. He was a good cricketer at Cambridge University where he won a Blue for cricket in three seasons from 1911 to 1913, and he also played a first-class match for Ireland against Scotland in 1911.

He was a member of the House of Commons of Northern Ireland for Down and was Assistant Parliamentary Secretary at the Ministry of Finance and Assistant Whip from 1925 until 1929, after which he served as Speaker of the House. He was admitted to the Privy Council of Northern Ireland in 1930 and in 1945 he was created a Baronet, of Ballyscullion Park in the County of Londonderry.

Mulholland married Sheelah Brooke (1895–1982), daughter of Sir Arthur Brooke, 4th Baronet, and sister of The 1st Viscount Brookeborough, Prime Minister of Northern Ireland. He died in March 1971, aged 82, and was succeeded in the baronetcy by his son Michael, who in 1993 succeeded his cousin as fifth Baron Dunleath.

Parliament of Northern Ireland
New constituency	Member of Parliament for Down; 1921–1929; With: J. M. Andrews; James Craig; Éamon de Valera; Thomas Lavery; Robert McBride; Thomas McMullan; Patrick O'Neill	Constituency abolished
New constituency	Member of Parliament for Ards; 1929–1945	Succeeded by Robert Perceval-Maxwell
Preceded by Hon. Hugh O'Neill	Speaker of the Northern Ireland House of Commons; 1929–1945	Succeeded by Sir Norman Stronge
Political offices
Preceded by Thomas Henry Burn	Assistant Parliamentary Secretary to the Ministry of Finance; 1925–1929	Succeeded by Sir Basil Brooke
Party political offices
Preceded by Thomas Henry Burn	Unionist Assistant Whip; 1925–1929	Succeeded by Sir Basil Brooke
Baronetage of the United Kingdom
New creation	Baronet (of Ballyscullion Park); 1945–1971	Succeeded by Michael Henry Mulholland
Honorary titles
Preceded by Sir Dudley McCorkell	Lord Lieutenant of County Londonderry; 1960–1965	Succeeded by John Cherry Drennan
