= John Martin Mark =

Northern Ireland Unionist politician

John Martin Mark (17 January 1873 – 5 January 1948) was a Northern Ireland Unionist politician and solicitor. He was born in Artidillon, County Londonderry, the son of Presbyterian Minister John Mark and Jane Martin. He was married in 1905 to Jane Guthrie, with whom he raised a family.

He was elected to the House of Commons of Northern Ireland as an Ulster Unionist Party member for Londonderry at the 1921 general election, and was re-elected at the 1925 general election. He was elected unopposed for the North Londonderry constituency at the 1929 general election. He retired at the 1933 general election.

He was a resident magistrate from 1933 to 1943. He died 5 January 1948

Parliament of Northern Ireland
New parliament	Member of Parliament for Londonderry; 1921–1929	Constituency split
New constituency	Member of Parliament for North Londonderry; 1929–1933	Succeeded by Daniel Hall Christie
