= Mourne (Northern Ireland Parliament constituency) =

Coordinates: 54.164°N 6.134°W

- Former County constituency for the Parliament of Northern Ireland

Former constituency
- Created: 1929
- Abolished: 1973
- Election method: First past the post

Mourne was a constituency of the Parliament of Northern Ireland.

== Boundaries ==
Mourne was a county constituency comprising part of southern County Down, including the Mountains of Mourne. It was created when the House of Commons (Method of Voting and Redistribution of Seats) Act (Northern Ireland) 1929 introduced first-past-the-post elections throughout Northern Ireland. Mourne was created by the division of Down into eight new constituencies. The constituency survived unchanged, returning one Member of Parliament until the Parliament of Northern Ireland was temporarily suspended in 1972, and then formally abolished in 1973.

The seat included the town of Newcastle, the town of Kilkeel (which became an urban district in 1936) and also certain district electoral divisions of the rural districts of Banbridge, Downpatrick, Kilkeel and Newry No. 1.

== Politics ==
The seat had a small nationalist majority, with Nationalist Party candidates defeating unionists at every election, excepting 1938, when no nationalist stood.

== Members of Parliament ==
Elected	Party	Name
1929	Nationalist	Patrick O'Neill
1938	UUP	George Panter
1945	Nationalist	James McSparran
1958	Nationalist	James O'Reilly

== Election results ==
General Election 1929: Mourne
Party	Candidate	Votes	%	±%
Nationalist	Patrick O'Neill	6,575	55.1	
UUP	J. M. Boyle	5,352	44.9	
Majority		1,223	10.2	
Turnout		11,927	80.5	
Nationalist win (new seat)				

General Election 1933: Mourne
Party	Candidate	Votes	%	±%
Nationalist	Patrick O'Neill	6,674	54.1	−1.0
UUP	John Maynard Sinclair	5,667	45.9	+1.0
Majority		1,007	8.2	−2.0
Turnout		12,341	82.3	+1.8
Nationalist hold		Swing		

At the 1938 Northern Ireland general election, Unionist George Panter was elected unopposed.

General Election 1945: Mourne
Party	Candidate	Votes	%	±%
Nationalist	James McSparran	7,784	58.4	New
Ind. Unionist	James Brown	5,544	41.6	New
Majority		2,240	16.8	N/A
Turnout		13,328	85.2	N/A
Nationalist hold		Swing	N/A	

General Election 1949: Mourne
Party	Candidate	Votes	%	±%
Nationalist	James McSparran	7,462	55.3	−3.1
UUP	N. F. Gordon	6,020	44.7	New
Majority		1,442	10.6	−6.2
Turnout		13,482	83.2	−2.0
Nationalist hold		Swing		

General Election 1953: Mourne
Party	Candidate	Votes	%	±%
Nationalist	James McSparran	7,532	55.2	−0.1
UUP	Joseph Fisher	6,113	44.8	+0.1
Majority		1,419	10.4	−0.2
Turnout		13,645	82.6	−0.6
Nationalist hold		Swing		

General Election 1958: Mourne
Party	Candidate	Votes	%	±%
Nationalist	James O'Reilly	7,139	52.3	−2.9
UUP	Eileen Calvert	6,506	47.7	+2.9
Majority		633	4.6	−5.8
Turnout		13,645	84.7	+2.1
Nationalist hold		Swing		
