= West Down (Northern Ireland Parliament constituency) =

Coordinates: 54.344°N 6.041°W

- Former County constituency for the Parliament of Northern Ireland

Former constituency
- Created: 1929
- Abolished: 1973
- Election method: First past the post

West Down was a constituency of the Parliament of Northern Ireland.

== Boundaries ==
West Down was a county constituency comprising part of western County Down. It was created when the House of Commons (Method of Voting and Redistribution of Seats) Act (Northern Ireland) 1929 introduced first-past-the-post elections throughout Northern Ireland. West Down was created by the division of Down into eight new constituencies. It survived unchanged, returning one Member of Parliament, until the Parliament of Northern Ireland was temporarily suspended in 1972, and then formally abolished in 1973.

The seat included the town of Banbridge, and also certain district electoral divisions of the rural districts of Banbridge and Newry No.1.

== Politics ==
The seat had a substantial unionist majority and was always won by Ulster Unionist Party candidates. It was contested on three occasions by independent unionists, each of whom won over 40% of the votes cast, and once by a communist candidate.

== Members of Parliament ==
Elected	Party	Name
1929	UUP	Robert McBride
1933	UUP	Samuel Fryar
1938	UUP	John Edgar Bailey
1959	UUP	David John Little
1965	UUP	John Dobson

== Election results ==
At the 1929 Northern Ireland general election, Robert McBride was elected unopposed.

General Election 1933: West Down
Party	Candidate	Votes	%	±%
UUP	Samuel Fryar	6,168	55.9	N/A
Ind. Unionist	J. U. Finnery	4,863	44.1	New
Majority		1,305	11.8	N/A
Turnout		11,031	70.8	N/A
UUP hold		Swing	N/A	

General Election 1938: West Down
Party	Candidate	Votes	%	±%
UUP	John Edgar Bailey	7,178	59.8	+3.9
Ind. Unionist Party	R. J. Hale	4,833	40.2	New
Majority		2,345	19.6	+7.8
Turnout		12,011	73.4	+2.6
UUP hold		Swing		

General Election 1945: West Down
Party	Candidate	Votes	%	±%
UUP	John Edgar Bailey	8,197	76.5	+16.7
Communist (NI)	S. E. Maitland	2,524	23.5	New
Majority		5,673	53.0	+33.4
Turnout		10,721	66.3	−7.1
UUP hold		Swing		

At the 1949, 1953 and 1958 Northern Ireland general elections, John Edgar Bailey was elected unopposed.

At the 1959 by-election and the 1962 Northern Ireland general election, David John Little was elected unopposed.

At the 1965 by-election and the 1965 Northern Ireland general election, John Dobson was elected unopposed.

General Election 1969: West Down
Party	Candidate	Votes	%	±%
UUP	John Dobson	7,608	59.3	N/A
Ind. Unionist	A. W. Buller	5,219	40.7	New
Majority		2,389	18.6	N/A
Turnout		12,827	77.5	N/A
UUP hold		Swing	N/A	
