= John Dobson (Northern Ireland politician) =

John Dobson (7 May 1929 - 12 September 2009) was a former solicitor and unionist politician in Northern Ireland.

Born in Lurgan, Dobson studied at Lurgan College and Trinity College Dublin. He joined the Ulster Unionist Party and was elected to Banbridge Urban District Council in 1961, serving until 1967. In 1965, he was elected to the Northern Ireland House of Commons, representing West Down. From 1968 he served as chairman of the backbench grouping, the 66 Committee, standing down the following year, when he was appointed Minister and Leader of the House of Commons, a post he held until 1971.

Parliament of Northern Ireland
| Preceded by David John Little | Member of Parliament for West Down; 1965–1973 | Parliament abolished |
Party political offices
| Preceded by Dinah McNabb | Chairman of the 66 Committee; 1968–1969 | Succeeded by Joseph Burns |
| Preceded by Roy Bradford | Ulster Unionist Chief Whip; 1969–1971 | Succeeded by John Brooke |
Political offices
| Preceded by James Chichester-Clark | Minister and Leader of the House of Commons; 1969–1971 | Succeeded by Nat Minford |
