= North Londonderry (Northern Ireland Parliament constituency) =

Coordinates: 55.095°N 6.763°W

- Former County constituency for the Parliament of Northern Ireland
- North Londonderry shown within Northern Ireland

Former constituency
- Created: 1929
- Abolished: 1973
- Election method: First past the post

North Londonderry was a county constituency comprising the northern part of County Londonderry. It was created in 1929, when the House of Commons (Method of Voting and Redistribution of Seats) Act (Northern Ireland) 1929 introduced first-past-the-post elections throughout Northern Ireland. It was created in 1929 as one of five single-member constituencies replacing the former five-member Londonderry constituency. The constituency survived unchanged, returning one member of Parliament until the Parliament of Northern Ireland was temporarily suspended in 1972, and then formally abolished in 1973.

The constituency included the towns of Coleraine, Limavady and Portstewart.

The seat was always held by Ulster Unionist Party candidates, and was rarely contested.

== Members of Parliament ==
- 1929–1933: John Martin Mark, Ulster Unionist Party
- 1933–1938: Daniel Hall Christie, Ulster Unionist Party
- 1938–1958: Robert Moore, Ulster Unionist Party
- 1958–1973: Joseph Burns, Ulster Unionist Party

== Election results ==
At the 1929 Northern Ireland general election, John Martin Mark was elected unopposed.

At the 1933 Northern Ireland general election, Daniel Hall Christie was elected unopposed.

At the 1938 Northern Ireland general election, Robert Moore was elected unopposed.

General Election 1945: North Londonderry
| Party | Candidate | Votes | % | ±% |
|---|---|---|---|---|
| UUP | Robert Moore | 11,003 | 77.4 | N/A |
| NI Labour | J. D. Murphy | 3,219 | 22.6 | New |
| Majority | | 7,784 | 54.8 | N/A |
| Turnout | | 14,222 | 68.3 | N/A |
| UUP hold | | Swing | N/A | |

At the 1949 Northern Ireland general election, Robert Moore was elected unopposed.

General Election 1953: North Londonderry
| Party | Candidate | Votes | % | ±% |
|---|---|---|---|---|
| UUP | Robert Moore | 11,242 | 77.4 | N/A |
| Ind. Unionist | S. J. Henderson | 2,343 | 17.2 | New |
| Majority | | 8,899 | 60.2 | N/A |
| Turnout | | 13,585 | 62.4 | N/A |
| UUP hold | | Swing | N/A | |

At the 1960 North Londonderry by-election, and the 1962 and 1965 Northern Ireland general elections, Joseph Burns was elected unopposed.

General Election 1969: North Londonderry
| Party | Candidate | Votes | % | ±% |
|---|---|---|---|---|
| UUP | Joseph Burns | 9,364 | 50.3 | N/A |
| Ind. Unionist | J. W. S. Barr | 9,249 | 49.7 | New |
| Majority | | 115 | 0.6 | N/A |
| Turnout | | 18,613 | 76.1 | N/A |
| UUP hold | | Swing | N/A | |
