= Central Armagh =

Central Armagh may refer to:

- The central part of County Armagh
- Central Armagh (Northern Ireland Parliament constituency)
