= Mid Down =

Mid Down may refer to:

- The central part of County Down
- Mid Down (Northern Ireland Parliament constituency)
- Mid Down (UK Parliament constituency)
