= Iveagh (Northern Ireland Parliament constituency) =

Coordinates: 54.383°N 6.200°W

- Former County constituency for the Parliament of Northern Ireland

Former constituency
- Created: 1929
- Abolished: 1973
- Election method: First past the post

Iveagh (/ˈaɪveɪ/ EYE-vay) was a constituency of the Parliament of Northern Ireland.

== Boundaries ==
Iveagh was a county constituency comprising part of northern County Down, south west of Belfast. It was created when the House of Commons (Method of Voting and Redistribution of Seats) Act (Northern Ireland) 1929 introduced first-past-the-post elections throughout Northern Ireland. Iveagh was created by the division of Down into eight new constituencies. The constituency survived unchanged until 1969, when its eastern part became part of the new Lagan Valley constituency. It returned one Member of Parliament until the Parliament of Northern Ireland was temporarily suspended in 1972, and then formally abolished in 1973.

The original seat was centred on the town of Dromore and also included parts of the rural districts of Banbridge, Hillsborough, Waringstown and Moira.

== Politics ==
The seat had a substantial unionist majority and was always won by Ulster Unionist Party candidates. It was often contested by independent Unionists, and once by a member of the Protestant Unionist Party, some of whom were able to take more than 40% of the votes cast.

== Members of Parliament ==
Elected	Party	Name
1929	UUP	Margaret Waring
1933	UUP	John Charles Wilson
1938	UUP	Brian Maginess
1964	UUP	Samuel Magowan

== Election results ==
General Election 1929: Iveagh
Party	Candidate	Votes	%	±%
UUP	Margaret Waring	6,945	74.4	
Ind. Unionist	W. I. Wilson	2,392	25.6	
Majority		4,553	48.8	
Turnout		9,337	57.7	
UUP win (new seat)				

At the 1933 Northern Ireland general election, John Charles Wilson was elected unopposed.

General Election 1938: Iveagh
Party	Candidate	Votes	%	±%
UUP	Brian Maginess	6,862	58.2	N/A
Ind. Unionist	W. I. Wilson	4,938	41.8	New
Majority		1,924	16.4	N/A
Turnout		11,800	74.2	N/A
UUP hold		Swing	N/A	

At the 1945 Northern Ireland general election, Brian Maginess was elected unopposed.

General Election 1949: Iveagh
Party	Candidate	Votes	%	±%
UUP	Brian Maginess	9,708	81.9	N/A
Ind. Unionist	J. P. Ferguson	2,150	18.1	New
Majority		7,558	63.8	N/A
Turnout		11,858	72.4	N/A
UUP hold		Swing	N/A	

General Election 1953: Iveagh
Party	Candidate	Votes	%	±%
UUP	Brian Maginess	6,410	56.9	−25.0
Ind. Unionist	W. J. McCracken	4,850	43.1	N/A
Majority		1,560	13.8	−50.0
Turnout		11,260	65.7	−6.7
UUP hold		Swing		

General Election 1958: Iveagh
Party	Candidate	Votes	%	±%
UUP	Brian Maginess	6,625	58.5	+1.6
Ulster Protestant Action	Albert Duff	4,704	41.5	New
Majority		1,921	17.0	+4.2
Turnout		11,329	69.1	+3.4
UUP hold		Swing		

At the 1962 Northern Ireland general election, Brian Maginess was elected unopposed.

At the 1964 by-election and the 1965 Northern Ireland general election, Samuel Magowan was elected unopposed.

General Election 1969: Iveagh
Party	Candidate	Votes	%	±%
UUP	Samuel Magowan	6,869	61.1	N/A
Protestant Unionist	Charles Poots	4,365	38.9	New
Majority		2,504	22.2	N/A
Turnout		11,234	69.5	N/A
UUP hold		Swing	N/A	
