= Patrick O'Neill (politician) =

Northern Irish politician (1875–1938)

Patrick O'Neill (1875 – 2 February 1938) was an Irish nationalist politician and hotel proprietor.

== Life ==
Patrick O'Neill was born in Annaghmore, County Armagh, Ireland, in 1875. He married Mary (Minnie) McConville in 1903 in Portadown, County Armagh, and they moved to Warrenpoint, County Down, where he became the proprietor of the Victoria Hotel. They had five children: Mary Theresa (Molly), Harry Gerard, Bernard, Patrick, and Nora. Mary died (likely in childbirth) in 1911. In 1913, O'Neill married Brigid Smith in Moynalvey, County Meath, and they had four children: Brigid (Dolie), Jim, Teresa V. and Nuala. O'Neill and his family lived at the Crown Hotel in Warrenpoint, which he purchased in 1913. He died in 1938 in Warrenpoint.

== Political career ==
In his early political career, O'Neill served as Chairman of the Warrenpoint Urban District Council, as well as Justice of the Peace, for a number of years. He was appointed as the presiding officer at the Warrenpoint Town Hall polling station during the 1918 general election in Ireland, and then in 1920, he ran unsuccessfully in the election for County Councilors for the County Down constituency. That year, the Government of Ireland Act, 1920 was introduced to establish the partition of Ireland and create two devolved parliaments within the UK. O'Neill was elected to the newly formed Parliament of Northern Ireland as a nationalist MP for the Down constituency in the 1921 Northern Ireland general election. Partition, which had created a northern Catholic and nationalist majority in a primarily Protestant and Unionist state, was a key issue in this election. To protest the fact that Northern Ireland was established to have a Unionist majority, the Nationalist party members, including O'Neill, abstained from taking their seats during the first parliament. O'Neill was re-elected in the 1925 election, and in early 1926 decided to enter parliament after it was decided at a convention in his constituency that it was no longer useful for the nationalist MPs to abstain. In 1928, he was elected as a joint honorary secretary of the newly formed National League of the North. He sat in the Northern parliament for County Down until 1929 when the Unionist government eliminated proportional representation. At the 1929 Northern Ireland general election, he was elected for the Mourne constituency and was re-elected in 1933. He was spokesman of the Irish Nationalist Party on financial matters. O'Neill sat for the Mourne division until his retirement in 1938.

== Archives ==
A selection of the personal and political archives of Patrick O'Neill have been preserved by the Public Record Office of Northern Ireland and the University of St. Michael's College at the University of Toronto. The fonds ranges between 1875-1998, with the majority of the material from 1918-1938. The material available includes incoming and outgoing correspondence with constituents, government officials, supporters, and other MPs. Fonds also contains official documents, political pamphlets and booklets, election posters, newspaper clippings, personal records, photographs, and personal memorabilia.

Parliament of Northern Ireland
New constituency	Member of Parliament for Down; 1921–1929; With: J. M. Andrews; James Craig; Éamon de Valera; Thomas Lavery; Robert McBride; Thomas McMullan; Harry Mulholland	Constituency abolished
New constituency	Member of Parliament for Mourne; 1929–1938	Succeeded by George Panter
