= Joe Connellan =

Joseph Connellan, known as Joe Connellan (1889 – 11 April 1967) was a nationalist politician and newspaper editor in Ireland.

Connellan was educated at the Christian Brothers' School in Newry. He joined Sinn Féin in 1908 and was prominent in the Newry Sluagh. Later in life, he was active in the Gaelic League and was the Senior Vice President of the Ulster Council of the National Athletic and Cycling Association of Ireland.

Connellan was elected to the Newry Board of Governors in 1920, serving until 1922. In the 1929 Northern Ireland general election, he was elected in South Armagh, but stood down in 1933.

In 1949, Connellan was elected to the Northern Ireland House of Commons, representing South Down. He served until his death as a member of the Nationalist Party, and was regarded as a member of the right wing of the party. He was also a member of Newry Urban District Council and the Chairman of the National Popular Front in 1964. From 1965 until 1967, he served as the Shadow Minister of Education.

Parliament of Northern Ireland
New constituency	Member of Parliament for South Armagh; 1929–1933	Succeeded by Paddy McLogan
Preceded by Peter Murnoy	Member of Parliament for South Down; 1949–1967	Succeeded by Max Keogh
