= J. M. Andrews =

Prime Minister of Northern Ireland from 1940 to 1943

The Right Honourable J. M. Andrews CH
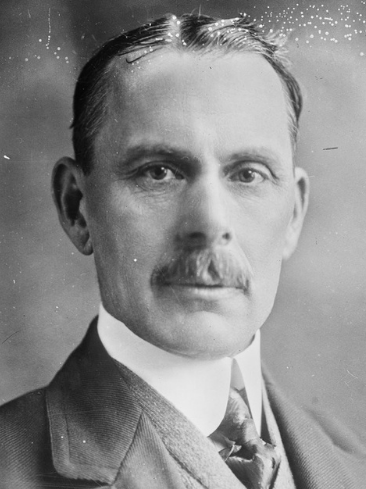
- Andrews, c. 1910s

2nd Prime Minister of Northern Ireland
- In office 27 November 1940 – 1 May 1943
- Monarch: George VI
- Governor: The Duke of Abercorn
- Preceded by: The Viscount Craigavon
- Succeeded by: Sir Basil Brooke, Bt

5th Leader of the Ulster Unionist Party
- In office 24 November 1940 – 1 May 1946
- Preceded by: The Viscount Craigavon
- Succeeded by: Sir Basil Brooke

Minister of Finance
- In office 21 April 1937 – 16 January 1941
- Prime Minister: The Viscount Craigavon; Himself
- Preceded by: Hugh MacDowell Pollock
- Succeeded by: John Milne Barbour

Minister of Labour
- In office 7 June 1921 – 21 April 1937
- Prime Minister: The Viscount Craigavon
- Preceded by: office established
- Succeeded by: David Graham Shillington

Member of the Northern Ireland Parliament for Mid Down
- In office 22 May 1929 – 22 October 1953
- Preceded by: Constituency Created
- Succeeded by: Jack Andrews

Member of the Northern Ireland Parliament for Down
- In office 24 May 1921 – 22 May 1929
- Preceded by: Constituency created
- Succeeded by: Constituency abolished

Personal details
- Born: John Miller Andrews; 17 July 1871 Comber, Ireland
- Died: 5 August 1956 (aged 85) Comber, Northern Ireland
- Party: Ulster Unionist Party
- Spouse: Jessie Andrews (m. 1902; died 1950)
- Children: 3
- Relatives: Thomas Andrews (brother); James Andrews (brother); Viscount Pirrie (uncle)
- Education: Royal Belfast Academical

John Miller Andrews (17 July 1871 – 5 August 1956) was the second Prime Minister of Northern Ireland from 1940 to 1943.

== Family life ==
Andrews was born in Comber, County Down, Ireland in 1871, the eldest child in the family of four sons and one daughter of Thomas Andrews (1843–1916), a wealthy flax spinning mills owner, chairman of the Belfast & County Down Railway Company, appointed Privy Counsellor [Ireland] in 1903 and Deputy Lieutenant and High Sheriff in 1912, and his wife Eliza Pirrie, a sister of Viscount Pirrie, chairman of Harland and Wolff shipbuilders.

He was educated at the Royal Belfast Academical Institution. In business, Andrews was a landowner, a director of his family linen-bleaching company and of the Belfast Ropeworks. His younger brother, Thomas Andrews, who died in the 1912 sinking of the RMS Titanic, was managing director of the Harland and Wolff shipyard in Belfast; another brother, Sir James Andrews, 1st Baronet, was Lord Chief Justice of Northern Ireland.

In 1902 he married Jessie (died 1950), eldest daughter of Bolton stockbroker Joseph Ormrod at Rivington Unitarian Chapel, Rivington, near Chorley, Lancashire, England. They had one son and two daughters. His younger brother, Sir James, married Jessie's sister.

== Political career ==
Andrews was elected as a member of parliament in the House of Commons of Northern Ireland, sitting from 1921 until 1953 (for County Down constituency from 1921 to 1929 and for Mid-Down from 1929 to 1953). He was a founder member of the Ulster Unionist Labour Association, which he chaired, and was Minister of Labour from 1921 to 1937. He was Minister of Finance from 1937 to 1940, succeeding to the position on the death of Hugh MacDowell Pollock; on the death of Lord Craigavon, in 1940, he became leader of the Ulster Unionist Party (UUP) and the second Prime Minister of Northern Ireland. Andrews was an opponent of the Irish language and called for it to be banned in schools. While serving as Minister of Labour (during the Partition of Ireland) Andrews commented on potential loss of areas within Northern Ireland by the Irish Boundary Commission. Speaking at a Unionist rally in Newry, County Armagh, Anderson said that the Northern Government would not concede the town to the newly formed Irish Free State "even if the Boundary Commission recommended it."

In April 1943 backbench dissent forced him from office. He was replaced as Prime Minister by Sir Basil Brooke. Andrews remained, however, the recognised leader of the UUP for a further three years. Five years later he became the Grand Master of the Grand Orange Lodge of Ireland. From 1949, he was the last parliamentary survivor of the original 1921 Northern Ireland Parliament, and as such was recognised as the Father of the House. He is the only Prime Minister of Northern Ireland not to have been granted a peerage; his predecessor and successor received hereditary viscountcies, and later Prime Ministers were granted life peerages.

Throughout his life he was deeply involved in the Orange Order; he held the positions of Grand Master of County Down from 1941 and Grand Master of Ireland (1948–1954). In 1949 he was appointed Imperial Grand Master of the Grand Orange Council of the World.

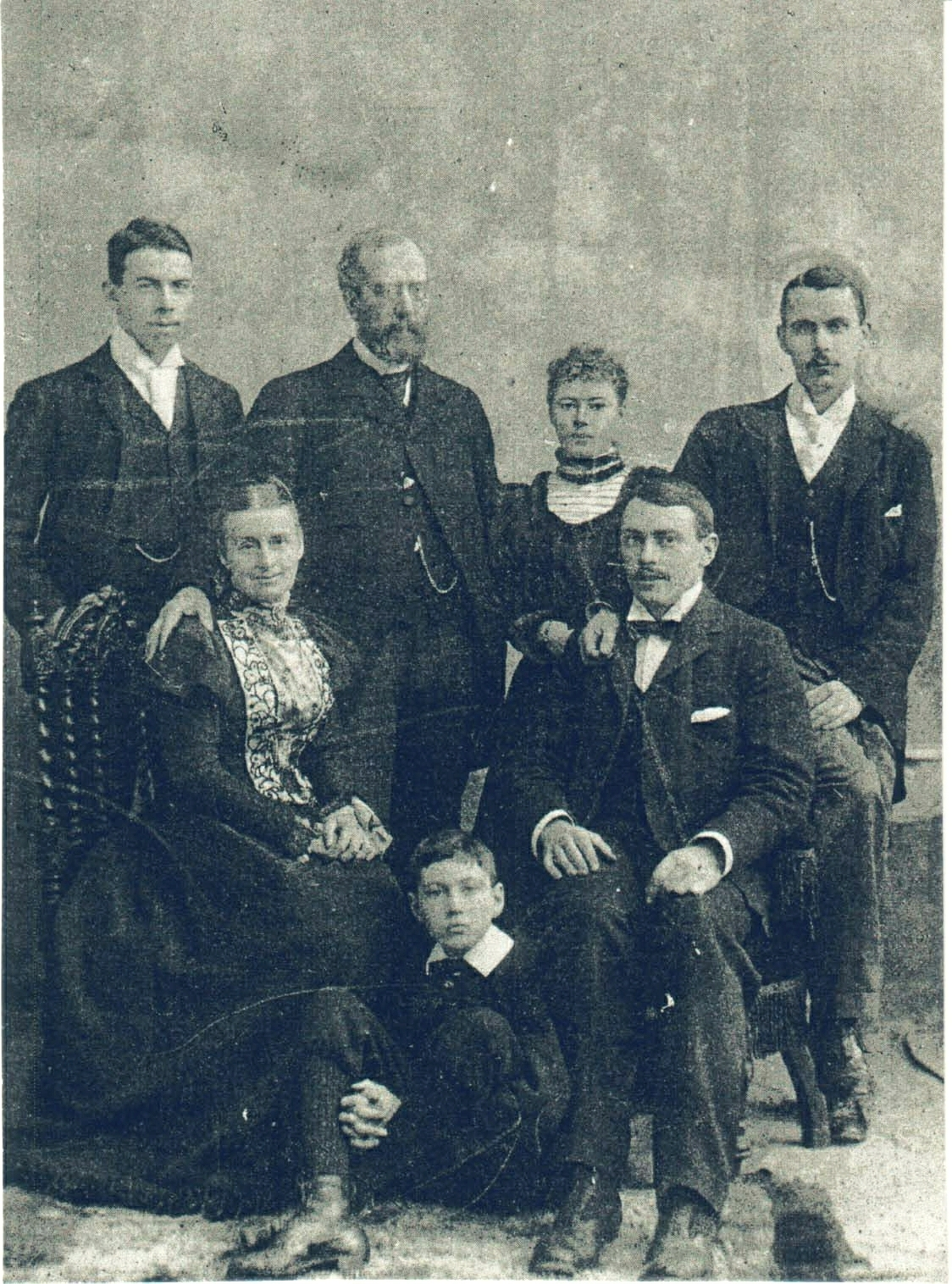
John Miller Andrews as a young man, with his parents and family, including his brother Thomas

Andrews was a committed and active member of the Non-subscribing Presbyterian Church of Ireland. He regularly attended Sunday worship, in the church built on land donated by his great-grandfather James Andrews in his home town Comber. Andrews served on the Comber Congregational Committee from 1896 until his death in 1956 (holding the position of Chairman from 1935 onwards). He is buried in the small graveyard adjoining the church.

He was named after his maternal great-uncle, John Miller of Comber (1795–1883).

== Sources ==
- Prominent Persons Index card from the Public Record Office of Northern Ireland
- History of Party leaders at the Ulster Unionist Party website
- The National Archives of the United Kingdom, with reference to the Public Records Office of Northern Ireland and containing a link to the Oxford Dictionary of National Biography (for subscribers only)
- Scoular, Clive (2004). John M. Andrews: Northern Ireland's Wartime Prime Minister by Clive Scoular. Printed by W & G Baird Ltd. An online review can be found at .

Parliament of Northern Ireland
New constituency	Member of Parliament for Down; 1921–1929; With: John Miller Andrews; Éamon de Valera; Thomas Lavery; Robert McBride; Thomas McMullan; Harry Mulholland; Patrick O'Neill	Constituency abolished
New constituency	Member of Parliament for Mid Down; 1929–1953	Succeeded by Jack Andrews
First	Father of the House; 1929–1953	Succeeded by Cahir Healy
Political offices
First	Minister of Labour; 1921–1937	Succeeded by David Graham Shillington
Preceded by Hugh MacDowell Pollock	Minister of Finance; 1937–1941	Succeeded by John Milne Barbour
Preceded by James Craig, 1st Viscount Craigavon	Prime Minister of Northern Ireland; 1940–1943	Succeeded by Sir Basil Brooke
Party political offices
Preceded by James Craig, 1st Viscount Craigavon	Leader of the Ulster Unionist Party; 1940–1946	Succeeded by Sir Basil Brooke
Non-profit organization positions
Preceded by Sir Joseph Davison	Grand Master of the Orange Institution of Ireland; 1948–1954	Succeeded by William McCleery
