= Thomas Lavery =

Irish Unionist politician (1852–1938)

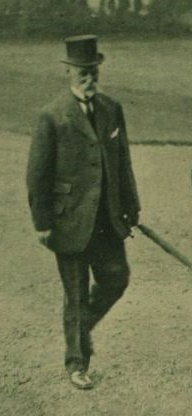
- Lavery in 1921

Member of the Senate of Northern Ireland
- In office 1930-1938

Member of Parliament for Down
- In office 1921-1929

Personal details
- Born: 1852
- Died: 1938 (aged 85–86)
- Political party: Unionist

Thomas Robert Lavery (1852–1938) was an Irish Unionist (and later Northern Irish Unionist) politician. He worked as a director of a hemstitching company before his election as an Ulster Unionist Party member of Down County Council.

== Biography ==
He served as Deputy Lieutenant of County Down. At the 1921 Northern Ireland general election, he was elected in Down, and he held his seat, unopposed, at the 1925 general election. He stood down in 1929, due to illness, but was nonetheless elected the following year to the Senate of Northern Ireland, serving until his death in 1938.

Parliament of Northern Ireland
New constituency	Member of Parliament for Down; 1921–1929; With: J. M. Andrews; James Craig; Éamon de Valera; Robert McBride; Thomas McMullan; Harry Mulholland; Patrick O'Neill	Constituency abolished
