= Margaret Waring =

Politician (1887–1968) from Northern Ireland

Member of the Northern Irish Parliament for Iveagh
- In office 1929–1933

Personal details
- Born: 14 November 1887
- Died: 9 May 1968 (aged 80)

Margaret Alicia Waring (14 November 1887 – 9 May 1968) was an Ulster Unionist Party politician.

The daughter of Joseph Charlton Parr of Grappallhen Heyes, Warrington, she married Major Holt Waring of Waringstown, County Down in 1914. He was killed in action at Kemmel Hill, 18 April 1918. The couple had no children.

She lived at her late husband's estate, Waringstown. She was elected as the MP for Iveagh in 1929, but stood down at the next election, in 1933. The Waringstown estate was inherited by her nephew, Michael Harnett, Esq., who still resides there.

Parliament of Northern Ireland
New constituency	Member of Parliament for Iveagh; 1929–1933	Succeeded by John Charles Wilson
