= John Charles Wilson =

Politician and physician from Northern Ireland

John Charles Wilson (1892–1968) was a Northern Irish physician and Ulster Unionist Party politician.

Wilson was educated at Queen's University of Belfast, and qualified as a physician. He served in World War I, from 1914 to 1918, in the RAMC.

In the Parliament of Northern Ireland, Wilson was the Member of Parliament (MP) for Iveagh from 1933 to 1938. He was a member of the Orange Order and Masonic Order.

Parliament of Northern Ireland
Preceded by Margaret Waring	Member of Parliament for Iveagh; 1933–1938	Succeeded by Brian Maginess
