= Down (Northern Ireland Parliament constituency) =

County constituency of the Parliament of Northern Ireland from 1921 - 1929

Coordinates: 54.557°N 6.311°W

- Former County constituency for the Parliament of Northern Ireland
- Down shown within Northern Ireland

Former constituency
- Created: 1921
- Abolished: 1929
- Election method: Single transferable vote

Down was a county constituency of the Parliament of Northern Ireland from 1921 to 1929. It returned eight MPs, using proportional representation by means of the single transferable vote.

== Boundaries ==
Down was created by the Government of Ireland Act 1920 and consisted of the administrative County Down, excluding the parts of the historic county within the County Borough of Belfast. The House of Commons (Method of Voting and Redistribution of Seats) Act (Northern Ireland) 1929 divided the constituency into eight constituencies elected under first past the post: Ards, East Down, Iveagh, Mid Down, Mourne, North Down, South Down and West Down.

== Second Dáil ==
In May 1921, Dáil Éireann, the parliament of the self-declared Irish Republic run by Sinn Féin, passed a resolution declaring that elections to the House of Commons of Northern Ireland and the House of Commons of Southern Ireland would also serve as the election for the Second Dáil. All those elected were on the roll of the Second Dáil, but Éamon de Valera, who was also elected for Clare, was the only MP elected for Down to sit as a TD in Dáil Éireann.

== Politics ==
Down had a Unionist majority, but with strong Nationalist support in the south. In both elections, six Unionists were elected, alongside one Nationalist and one Republican.

== Members of Parliament ==
Election	MP (Party)	MP (Party)	MP (Party)	MP (Party)	MP (Party)	MP (Party)	MP (Party)	MP (Party)
1921	James Craig (UUP)	J. M. Andrews (UUP)	Thomas Lavery (UUP)	Harry Mulholland (UUP)	Robert McBride (UUP)	Thomas McMullan (UUP)	Patrick O'Neill (Nationalist)	Éamon de Valera (Sinn Féin/Republican)
1925	James Craig (UUP)	J. M. Andrews (UUP)	Thomas Lavery (UUP)	Harry Mulholland (UUP)	Robert McBride (UUP)	Thomas McMullan (UUP)	Patrick O'Neill (Nationalist)	Éamon de Valera (Sinn Féin/Republican)

== Election results ==
1921 General Election: Down (8 seats)
Party	Candidate	FPv%	Count								
Party	Candidate	FPv%	1	2	3	4	5	6	7	8	9
UUP	James Craig	36.7	29,829								
Sinn Féin	Éamon de Valera	20.0	16,269								
UUP	J. M. Andrews	15.5	12,584								
Nationalist	Patrick O'Neill	9.0	7,317	7,332	7,806	7,809	7,811	7,814	7,818	7,820	8,171
UUP	Harry Mulholland	5.7	4,665	10,183							
UUP	Robert McBride	4.1	3,297	5,944	5,956	8,715	11,819				
UUP	Thomas Lavery	3.5	2,863	12,883							
UUP	Thomas McMullan	3.3	2,692	4,738	4,751	5,421	6,147	7,282	10,041		
Independent Labour	A. Adams	1.5	1,188	1,448	1,463	1,514	1,532	1,547	1,564	1,569	
Sinn Féin	Patrick Lavery	0.4	327	581	6,276	6,347	6,352	6,358	6,359	6,359	7,470
Sinn Féin	Patrick M. Moore	0.2	149	197	1,236	1,245	1,252	1,255	1,272	1,284	
Electorate: 93,138 Valid: 81,180 Quota: 9,021 Turnout: 87.2%

1925 General Election: Down (8 seats) (uncontested)
Party	Candidate
UUP	J. M. Andrews
UUP	James Craig
Republican	Éamon de Valera
UUP	Thomas Lavery
UUP	Robert McBride
UUP	Thomas McMullan
UUP	Harry Mulholland
Nationalist	Patrick O'Neill
