= Samuel Fryar =

- In office 1933–1938
- Constituency: West Down

Personal details
- Born: 4 February 1863 Banbridge, County Down, Ireland
- Died: 4 October 1938 (aged 75) Banbridge, County Down, Northern Ireland
- Party: Ulster Unionist
- Profession: Solicitor

Samuel Fryar (4 February 1863 – 4 October 1938) was an Irish solicitor, councillor and politician from Northern Ireland.

Samuel Fryar was born on 4 February 1863 at Banbridge, County Down in Ireland, to parents James Fryar and his wife Jane née Hamilton. He was educated at Banbridge Academy and Queen’s College, Galway, as a solicitor. He married Letitia Elizabeth Card née Sterling in 1893 and together they had two children.

In 1887, Fryar went into partnership with John Fawcett Gordon and opened a legal firm on Bridge Street called, Fryar and Gordon Solicitors. The firm operated under that name for nearly 100 years.

Fryar was a member of the Banbridge Urban District Council from 1894 to 1938. He was also a Solicitor to Banbridge Board of Guardians, Banbridge Rural District Council, and Tandragee Rural District Council. This included four years as Chairman of Banbridge Urban District Council.

In 1933, Fryar, an Ulster Unionist member sat for the general election of 1933 and defeated the Independent Unionist representative, James Finnery. Fryar remained a Member of Parliament until the general election of 1938, when he retired. Fryar died shortly after his retirement; on 4 October 1938, aged 75. His son, William Leonard Fryar, was awarded the British Victory Medal and the British War Medal for service during World War I.

Parliament of Northern Ireland
Preceded by Robert McBride	Member of Parliament for West Down; 1933–1938	Succeeded by John Edgar Bailey
