= Joseph Fisher (Northern Ireland politician) =

Joseph Fisher (1901 or 1902–1963) was a unionist politician in Northern Ireland.

Fisher worked as a solicitor and became an urban district councillor for the Ulster Unionist Party. At the 1953 Northern Ireland general election, he stood unsuccessfully for the party in Mourne. In 1957, he was elected to the Senate of Northern Ireland, serving until his death in 1963. From 1961 to 1962, he was a Deputy Speaker of the Senate.
