= Sir David Reid, 1st Baronet =

Politician from Northern Ireland

Sir David Douglas Reid Bt JP MP
- Born: 24 August 1872
- Died: 23 March 1939 (aged 66); London
- Resting place: Kilmore, County Down
- Education: New College, Oxford (B.A. 1896)
- Occupations: Barrister, Politician
- Spouse: Florence Reid (m.1904)
- Children: none

Sir David Douglas Reid, 1st Baronet, JP (24 August 1872 – 23 March 1939) was the Unionist Member of Parliament for Down from 1922 until his death in 1939.

Only son of Joseph Reid, of 22 Elmwood Avenue, Belfast, he attended Queens College, Belfast and New College, Oxford, graduating with 1st Class Honours in History. He then became a barrister at the Inner Temple and was called to the Bar in 1898. He contested East Tyrone in 1910 before becoming a Unionist Member of Parliament (MP) for East Down from 1918 to 1922, when the constituency was abolished. He was Chairman of the Ulster Unionist Party at Westminster.

In 1936, when appointed Sheriff of Down, he was created a Baronet, of Rademon. (Prior to his creation as a baronet, he was known as "D. D. Reid".) Upon his death the baronetcy became extinct.

Sir David died in Brown's Hotel, London and was buried in Kilmore, Crossgar, County Down.

== Arms ==
Coat of arms of Sir David Reid, 1st Baronet

Notes
Granted by Sir Nevile Rodwell Wilkinson, 16th June 1936.
Crest
A double-headed eagle displayed Sable armed and langued Vert gorged with a mural crown Proper.
Escutcheon
Per chevron Argent and Or in base a double-headed eagle displayed Sable armed and langued Vert and in chief three thistles Proper.
Motto
Spectemur Agendo

Parliament of the United Kingdom
Preceded by James Craig	Member of Parliament for East Down; 1918–1922	Constituency abolished
New constituency	Member of Parliament for Down; 1922–1939; With: John Simms 1922–31; Viscount Castlereagh 1931–39	Succeeded by James Little; Viscount Castlereagh
Baronetage of the United Kingdom
New creation	Baronet (of Rademon); 1936–1939	Extinct
