= James Craig, 2nd Viscount Craigavon =

British peer (1906–1974)

The Right Honourable The Viscount Craigavon
- Portrait of James Craig, 1939

Member of the House of Lords Lord Temporal
- In office 25 November 1940 – 18 May 1974; Hereditary Peerage
- Preceded by: The 1st Viscount Craigavon
- Succeeded by: The 3rd Viscount Craigavon

Personal details
- Born: 2 March 1906
- Died: 18 May 1974 (aged 68)
- Spouse: Angela Tatchell
- Children: 3

James Craig, 2nd Viscount Craigavon (2 March 1906 – 18 May 1974), was a British hereditary peer who sat in the House of Lords.

He was the son of James Craig, 1st Viscount Craigavon, first Prime Minister of Northern Ireland and Cecil Mary Nowell Dering Craig. He succeeded to his father's peerage upon his death in 1940.

He was educated at Eton College and served in the Royal Navy. He later worked as a Liaison and Entertainments Officer on the Orient Line and the Peninsular and Oriental Steam Navigation Company on its Liner, Cruise and Round World Voyages. Lord Craigavon was married to Angela Fiona (1918-2007), daughter of Percy Tatchell, MRCS, and had three children:

== Issue ==
- The Hon. Janitha Stormont Craig (born 31 August 1940) in 1965 married Gordon Robert MacInnes, eldest son of Robert Wood MacInnes, of Ruislip and has issue.
  - Avila MacInnes (born 19 October 1967)
  - Córdova MacInnes (born 10 December 1972)
  - Jimena MacInnes (born 20 March 1975)
- The Rt. Hon. Janric Fraser Craig, 3rd Viscount Craigavon
- The Hon. Jacaranda Fiona Craig (born 8 January 1949) in 1972 married Dudley Francis Macdonald, of 26 Paroman Towers, George Street, London W1 and has issue. They divorced in 1983.
  - Toby James Francis Macdonald (born 19 August 1975)
  - Rose Carole Macdonald (born 18 January 1978)

== Arms ==
Coat of arms of James Craig, 2nd Viscount Craigavon
Notes Coat of arms of the Craig family Crest A demi-lion rampant per fess Gules and Sable holding in the dexter paw a mullet Or. Escutcheon Gules a fess Ermine between three bridges of as many arches Proper. Supporters Dexter a Constable of the Ulster Special Constabulary his hand resting on a rifle Proper sinister a Private of the Royal Ulster Rifles armed and accoutred also Proper. Motto Charity Provokes Charity

Peerage of the United Kingdom
Preceded by James Craig	Viscount Craigavon; 1940 – 1974	Succeeded by Janric Craig
