= D.H. Christie Memorial Primary School =

Coordinates: 55°08′24.7″N 6°40′54.7″W

D. H. Christie Memorial Primary School

Location
- Ballycairn Road; Coleraine, BT51 3HX; Northern Ireland

Information
- Type: Controlled primary school
- Motto: Working Together to be the Best We Can Be
- Established: 1967
- Founder: The Honourable The Irish Society
- Principal: Mr P. Henry
- Headmaster: Mr P. Henry
- Age range: 4–11
- Colors: Grey; Red; White
- Website: www.dhchristiemps.org

D. H. Christie Memorial Primary School is a controlled primary school located on Ballycairn Road in Coleraine, Northern Ireland. Opened in 1967, the school was named after a local politician, Daniel Hall Christie.

== History ==
The school was established in 1967 by The Honourable The Irish Society. It was named in honour of Daniel Hall Christie (1881–1965), a member of Londonderry County and Coleraine Borough councils, chairman of Coleraine District Council, mayor of Coleraine, a Member of the Parliament of Northern Ireland and High Sheriff of County Londonderry.

== Notable alumni ==
- Alan Jones (architect)
- Hannah Scott (rower)
- Jayne Wisener (actress)
