= Central Armagh (Northern Ireland Parliament constituency) =

Coordinates: 54.393°N 6.417°W

- Former County constituency for the Parliament of Northern Ireland
- Central Armagh shown within Northern Ireland

Former constituency
- Created: 1929
- Abolished: 1973
- Election method: First past the post

Central Armagh was a constituency of the Parliament of Northern Ireland.

== Boundaries ==
Central Armagh was a county constituency comprising the north central part of County Armagh. It was created when the House of Commons (Method of Voting and Redistribution of Seats) Act (Northern Ireland) 1929 introduced first-past-the-post elections throughout Northern Ireland. Central Armagh was created by the division of Armagh into four new constituencies. The constituency survived unchanged, returning one member of Parliament, until the Parliament of Northern Ireland was temporarily suspended in 1972, and then formally abolished in 1973.

The seat was centred on the towns of Portadown and Tandragee and included parts of the rural districts of Armagh, Lurgan and Tandragee.

== Politics ==
The seat was always won by Ulster Unionist Party candidates. It was twice contested by labour movement candidates, who took around one third of the votes cast.

== Members of Parliament ==
Elected	Party	Name
1929	UUP	David Shillington
1941	UUP	George Dougan
1955	UUP	Isaac Hawthorne
1969	UUP	Herbert Whitten

== Election results ==
At the 1929, 1933 and 1938 Northern Ireland general elections, David Shillington was elected unopposed.

At the 1941 by-election, George Dougan was elected unopposed.

General Election 1945: Central Armagh
Party	Candidate	Votes	%	±%
UUP	George Dougan	9,508	67.6	N/A
Commonwealth Labour	Thomas Martin	4,559	32.4	New
Majority		4,949	35.2	N/A
Turnout		14,067	74.0	N/A
UUP hold		Swing	N/A	

At the 1949, and 1953 Northern Ireland general elections, George Dougan was elected unopposed.

At the 1955 by-election and the 1958 Northern Ireland general election, Isaac Hawthorne was elected unopposed.

General Election 1962: Central Armagh
Party	Candidate	Votes	%	±%
UUP	Isaac Hawthorne	9,390	64.8	N/A
NI Labour	Thomas Newell	5,101	35.2	New
Majority		4,289	29.6	N/A
Turnout		14,491	67.0	N/A
UUP hold		Swing	N/A	

At 1965 Northern Ireland general election, Isaac Hawthorne was elected unopposed.

At 1969 Northern Ireland general election, Herbert Whitten was elected unopposed.
