= Robert Moore (Northern Ireland politician) =

The Rt Hon. and Reverend Robert Moore, PC (1886 – 1 September 1960), was a Northern Irish politician and Presbyterian minister.

He was born and raised at Ballymacannon, a townland near the village of Ringsend in County Londonderry in Ulster, the northern province in Ireland. His father was Kennedy Moore, a local farmer, while his mother was Mary Elizabeth Moore (née McFetridge). He was later educated at Coleraine Academical Institution and Queen's College, Galway (QCG). He took his theological course at Magee College, Derry. Ordained in 1912, he was installed as the Presbyterian minister in his native village of Ringsend, near Coleraine, in County Londonderry, succeeding his uncle, the Rev. R.J.O. Moore, as minister.

President of the Ulster Farmers' Union (UFU) from 1937 to 1940 and from 1941 to 1942, he was returned to the House of Commons of Northern Ireland (Stormont) for North Londonderry from the 1938 election until his death. Moore was made Minister of Agriculture for Northern Ireland on 6 May 1943, in which capacity he ensured that Northern Irish farmers shared in guaranteed prices for all farmers in the United Kingdom and that Northern Irish farmers would be compensated for their remoteness from the British market. He served in this position until his death on 1 September 1960.

Moore was made a member of the Privy Council of Northern Ireland (PC) in 1943.

Parliament of Northern Ireland
| Preceded by Daniel Hall Christie | Member of Parliament for North Londonderry; 1938–1960 | Succeeded by Joseph Burns |
Political offices
| Preceded by The 1st Baron Glentoran | Minister of Agriculture; 1943–1960 | Succeeded by Harry West |
