= Isaac George Hawthorne =

Isaac George Hawthorne (12 November 1912 – December 1992) was a Unionist politician in Northern Ireland.

Hawthorne was schooled in Portadown and Sheffield before becoming a farmer. He was elected to Armagh County Council in 1947 as an Ulster Unionist Party member, holding his seat until 1958. In 1955, he was elected to the Parliament of Northern Ireland in a bye-election in Central Armagh.

From 1959 to 1963, Hawthorne served as Ulster Unionist Chief Whip, a position which was accompanied by the title Parliamentary Secretary to the Ministry of Finance. From 1965, he served as an Assistant Whip then, in 1966, he became Parliamentary Secretary to the Ministry of Development. In September 1967, he was convicted of drink driving and resigned his post. He was unable to secure reselection by his constituency party for the 1969 Northern Ireland general election, and decided to stand down from Parliament.

== Notes ==
Parliament of Northern Ireland
Preceded by George Dougan	Member of Parliament for Central Armagh; 1955–1969	Succeeded by Herbert Whitten
Party political offices
Preceded by Brian Faulkner	Unionist Chief Whip; 1959–1963	Succeeded by William Craig
Vacant Title last held by James Chichester-Clark	Unionist Assistant Whip; 1965–1966	Succeeded by Roy Bradford; Samuel Magowan
Political offices
Preceded by Brian Faulkner	Parliamentary Secretary to the Ministry of Finance; 1956–1963	Succeeded by William Craig
Vacant Title last held by James Chichester-Clark	Assistant Parliamentary Secretary to the Ministry of Finance; 1965–1966	Succeeded by Roy Bradford; Samuel Magowan
