= Cecil Craig, Viscountess Craigavon =

The Right Honourable The Viscountess Craigavon DBE
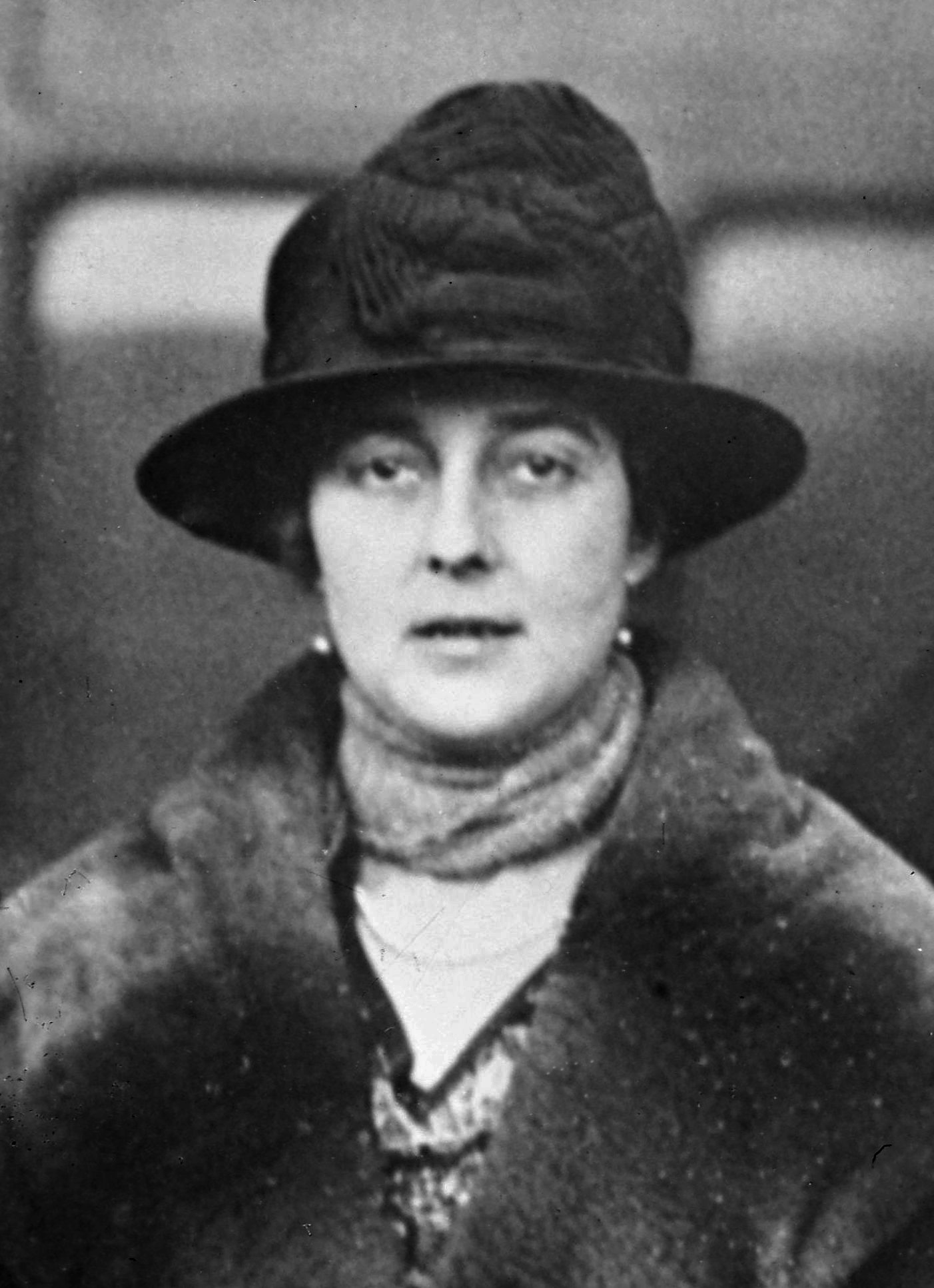
- Craig in 1924

Personal details
- Born: Cecil Mary Nowell Dering Tupper; 22 January 1883; Belgravia, London, England
- Died: 23 March 1960 (aged 77); Merle, Wiltshire, England
- Spouse: James Craig, 1st Viscount Craigavon
- Children: James Craig, 2nd Viscount Craigavon; Patrick William Denis Craig; Ellinor Aileen Cecil Craig
- Parents: Sir Daniel Tupper (father); Mary Dering (mother)

Cecil Mary Nowell Dering Craig, Viscountess Craigavon, DBE (née Tupper; 22 January 1883 – 23 March 1960) was an English-born Ulster Unionist activist and politician in Northern Ireland.

== Life ==
Cecil Mary Nowell Dering Tupper was born at 26 Chester Terrace, Belgrave Square, London on 22 January 1883. Her father was assistant comptroller of the lord chamberlain's department in the king's household, Sir Daniel Tupper, and her mother was Mary Tupper (née Dering). In 1904 she met her future husband, James Craig, 1st Viscount Craigavon at a shooting party in County Tyrone. They were married in March 1905 at the Chapel Royal, St James's Palace, London. They had twin sons and one daughter, James Craig, 2nd Viscount Craigavon, Major Hon. Patrick William Dennis Craig (2 March 1906 – 15 August 1972), and Hon. Ellinor Aileen Cecil Craig (20 August 1907 – 23 April 1978).

Having moved to Ulster, she became active in local politics. Craig was a founding member of the Ulster Women's Unionist Council (UWUC), serving as vice-president from 1912 to 1923 and president from 1923 to 1942. She led the UWUC's delegation at the 1933 women's conference in London. She also served for more than 20 years as the vice-president of the Ulster Unionist Council.

In 1927, she became Lady Craigavon when her husband was created Viscount Craigavon. Throughout her husband's political career, Craig took an interest and participated in his political activities.

Due to her husband's poor health, she took responsibility for many of his public duties during the 1937 royal visit to Northern Ireland. Throughout the 1920s and 1930s, she accompanied him on his many cruises and international visits. She served as the governor and patron of the Ulster Hospital for Women and Children.

In 1941, she was awarded a DBE, and was also a commander of the Order of St John. She settled in England after the death of her husband in 1940.

== Death ==
Craig died at her home in Mere, Wiltshire on 23 March 1960, and was buried beside her husband in the grounds of Stormont. A bridge on the Upper Lough Erne from Transa Island to Derrymacusey, which opened in 1936, is named in her honour.
