= John Simms (minister) =

British clergyman

The Reverend John Simms CB CMG
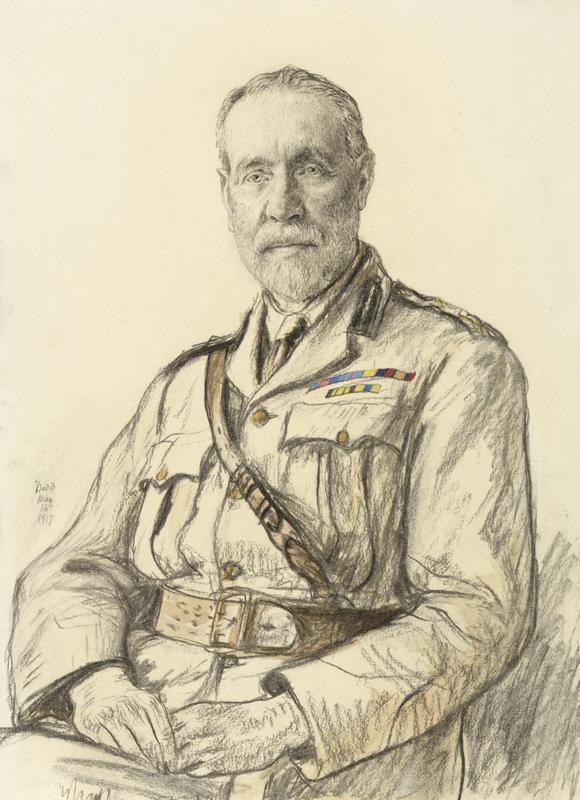

Member of Parliament for Down North Down (July–November 1922)
- In office 21 July 1922 – 7 October 1931 Serving with David Reid (Nov. 1922–1931)
- Preceded by: Henry Wilson
- Succeeded by: James Little; Viscount Castlereagh

Personal details
- Born: 23 November 1854 Newtownards, Ireland
- Died: 29 April 1934 (aged 79) Belfast, Northern Ireland
- Party: Ulster Unionist Party
- Education: Queen's University Belfast; University of Edinburgh; Leipzig University
- Profession: Clergyman; Soldier

John Morrow Simms CB CMG (23 November 1854 – 29 April 1934) was a Presbyterian minister and unionist politician in Northern Ireland.

== Biography ==
Born in Newtownards, Simms studied at the Belfast Academy, the Coleraine Academical Institution, Queen's University, Belfast, the University of Edinburgh and Leipzig University. In 1882, he was ordained as a Presbyterian Church in Ireland clergyman, and became a British Army chaplain in 1887. He was elected for the Ulster Unionist Party at the July 1922 North Down by-election, and when the seat was abolished later in the year, won a seat in Down, serving until the 1931 UK general election. From 1914 to 1920, he was Principal Chaplain to the Forces, and held rank relative to major-general. He subsequently became Honorary Chaplain to George V of the United Kingdom.

Presbyterian Church titles
Preceded by James McGranahan (1918)	Moderator of the Presbyterian Church in Ireland; 1919	Succeeded by Hugh Patterson Glenn (1920)
Parliament of the United Kingdom
Preceded by Henry Wilson	Member of Parliament for North Down; 1922–1922	constituency abolished
New constituency	Member of Parliament for Down; 1922–1931; With: David Reid	Succeeded by Robin Vane-Tempest-Stewart; David Reid
