= Peter Murnoy =

Politician from Northern Ireland

Peter Murney

Member of Parliament for South Down
- In office 1945–1949

Personal details
- Born: Kilowen Co. Down
- Political party: Nationalist
- Military career
- Allegiance: Ireland
- Service / branch: Irish Republican Army

Peter Murney was a nationalist politician and political activist in Northern Ireland.

== Biography ==
Murney was a farmer and was a volunteer in the Irish Republican Army from 1916 until 1922, as were his brothers Míchaél and Pól Murney who were both interned in Larne prison camp, he along with his brothers joined the Anti-Treaty side of the Civil war. In 1926, he was the joint founder of the National Defence Association, which opposed recognition of Stormont. In 1937, Murney launched the National Council of Unity, which aimed to apply the new Constitution of Ireland to the whole of the island.

Murney was elected to the Parliament of Northern Ireland as the Nationalist Party MP for South Down at the 1945 general election. He was active in the Irish Anti-Partition League, but controversially refused to condemn T. J. Campbell leaving the Parliament to become a judge. Murney was defeated at the South Down Nationalist selection convention before the 1949 Northern Ireland general election, and stood down.

Parliament of Northern Ireland
Preceded by James Brown	Member of Parliament for South Down; 1945–1949	Succeeded by Joe Connellan
