= Londonderry (Northern Ireland Parliament constituency) =

Northern Ireland Parliament constituency, 1921–1929

Coordinates: 54.922°N 6.953°W

- Former County constituency for the Parliament of Northern Ireland
- Londonderry shown within Northern Ireland

Former constituency
- Created: 1921
- Abolished: 1929
- Replaced by: City of Londonderry; Foyle; Mid Londonderry; North Londonderry; South Londonderry
- Election method: Single transferable vote

Londonderry was a county constituency of the Parliament of Northern Ireland from 1921 to 1929. It returned five MPs, using proportional representation by means of the single transferable vote. It was abolished in 1929 when proportional representation was replaced with first past the post and split into five separate constituencies as a result.

== Boundaries ==
Londonderry was created by the Government of Ireland Act 1920 and consisted of the entirety of County Londonderry, including the county borough of Londonderry. The constituency was abolished under the House of Commons (Method of Voting and Redistribution of Seats) Act (Northern Ireland) 1929, which created five new constituencies elected under first past the post: City of Londonderry, Foyle, Mid Londonderry, North Londonderry and South Londonderry.

== Second Dáil ==
In May 1921, Dáil Éireann, the parliament of the self-declared Irish Republic run by Sinn Féin in Southern Ireland, passed a resolution declaring that elections to the House of Commons of Northern Ireland and the House of Commons of Southern Ireland would be used as the election for the Second Dáil. All those elected were on the roll of the Second Dáil, but Eoin MacNeill, who was also elected for the National University of Ireland, was the only MP elected for Londonderry to sit as a TD in Dáil Éireann.

== Politics ==
Londonderry was a predominantly Unionist constituency with a substantial Nationalist minority, electing three Unionists, one Nationalist and one Sinn Féin member in 1921 and three Unionists and two Nationalists in 1925.

== Members of Parliament ==
Election	MP (Party)	MP (Party)	MP (Party)	MP (Party)	MP (Party)
1921	Robert Newton Anderson (UUP)	Dehra Chichester (UUP)	John Martin Mark (UUP)	George Leeke (Nationalist)	Eoin MacNeill; Sinn Féin
1925	Robert Newton Anderson (UUP)	Dehra Chichester (UUP)	John Martin Mark (UUP)	George Leeke (Nationalist)	Basil McGuckin (Nationalist)

== Elections results ==
1921 General Election: Londonderry (5 seats)
Party	Candidate	FPv%	Count					
Party	Candidate	FPv%	1	2	3	4	5	6
UUP	Robert Newton Anderson	24.9	13,466					
Sinn Féin	Eoin MacNeill	22.0	11,866					
UUP	Dehra Chichester	16.1	8,709	12,544				
UUP	John Martin Mark	15.1	8,155	8,764	8,801	12,280		
Nationalist	George Leeke	11.7	6,298	6,315	6,483	6,543	6,550	7,710
Sinn Féin	J. Walsh	7.4	4,020	4,022	6,519	6,521	6,521	6,980
Nationalist	H. W. Shields	2.7	1,474	1,478	1,643	1,647	1,647	
Electorate: 62,111 Valid: 53,988 Quota: 8,999 Turnout: 86.9%

1925 General Election: Londonderry (5 seats)
Party	Candidate	FPv%	Count				
Party	Candidate	FPv%	1	2	3	4	5
Nationalist	George Leeke	27.2	13,671				
UUP	Robert Newton Anderson	24.0	12,085				
UUP	John Martin Mark	17.5	8,804				
UUP	Dehra Chichester	16.4	8,261	8,288	11,969		
Republican	C. MacWhinney	11.0	5,546	5,701	5,705	5,749	5,756
Nationalist	Basil McGuckin	3.9	1,973	7,071	7,080	7,171	7,184
Electorate: 63,174 Valid: 50,340 Quota: 8,391 Turnout: 79.7%
