= John William Kennedy =

Northern Irish politician

John William Kennedy (born 1910, date of death unknown) was a Northern Irish Ulster Unionist politician who was a member of the Parliament of Northern Ireland. He represented Belfast Cromac from 1962 to 1973.

Kennedy was an area supervisor for a tailoring firm and member of Belfast Corporation. He was the founder of the British Sailors Friendly League. He was the only post-World War II member of the Ulster Unionist Labour Association to sit in the Stormont House of Commons.

Kennedy served as Assistant Whip from 1969 until 1972, also holding the office of Assistant Parliamentary Secretary at the Ministry of Finance from March to May 1969.

== Sources ==
- Biographies of Members of the Northern Ireland House of Commons
- The Government of Northern Ireland

Parliament of Northern Ireland
Preceded by Joseph William Morgan	Member of Parliament for Belfast Cromac; 1962–1973	Parliament abolished
Party political offices
Preceded by Joseph Burns; Samuel Magowan	Unionist Assistant Whip; 1969–1972	Office abolished
Political offices
Preceded by Joseph Burns; Samuel Magowan	Assistant Parliamentary Secretary to the Ministry of Finance; 1969–1972	Office abolished
Civic offices
Preceded by Myles Humphreys	High Sheriff of Belfast; 1970–1971	Succeeded by Francis Watson
