= Roy Bradford =

British Unionist politician in Northern Ireland and government minister

Mayor of North Down
- In office 1994–1995
- Preceded by: Brian Wilson
- Succeeded by: Susan O'Brien

Member of North Down Borough Council
- In office 17 May 1989 – 7 June 2001
- Preceded by: Cecil Braniff
- Succeeded by: Royston Davies
- Constituency: Bangor West

Member of the Northern Ireland Assembly for East Belfast
- In office 1973–1974

Minister of Development
- In office 25 March 1971 – 30 March 1972
- Monarch: Elizabeth II
- Prime Minister: Brian Faulkner
- Preceded by: Brian Faulkner
- Succeeded by: Abolished

Minister of Commerce
- In office 24 January 1969 – 23 March 1971
- Monarch: Elizabeth II
- Prime Minister: Terence O'Neill 1963–69; James Chichester-Clark 1969-1971
- Preceded by: Brian Faulkner
- Succeeded by: Robin Bailie

Member of Parliament for Belfast Victoria
- In office 25 November 1965 – 30 March 1972
- Preceded by: David Bleakley
- Succeeded by: Parliament abolished
- Majority: 423 (3.2%)

Personal details
- Born: Roy Hamilton Bradford; 7 July 1921 Ligoniel, Belfast, Northern Ireland
- Died: 2 September 1998 (aged 77) Belfast, Northern Ireland
- Party: Ulster Unionist Party
- Other political affiliations: Unionist Party NI (1974)
- Spouse: Hazel Bradford
- Children: Conor Bradford
- Education: Trinity College Dublin
- Occupation: Politician

Roy Hamilton Bradford (7 July 1921 – 2 September 1998) was a Northern Irish unionist politician. Bradford was a government minister in both the Parliament of Northern Ireland and the 1973 Northern Ireland Assembly.

== Background ==
Born in Ligoniel in Belfast, Bradford studied at the Royal Belfast Academical Institution and Trinity College Dublin, where he was elected a Scholar. He then worked in British Army intelligence before moving to London, where he worked for the BBC and ITV. In 1960, he published a novel, Excelsior.

At the 1965 Northern Ireland general election, Bradford was elected for the Ulster Unionist Party (UUP) in Belfast Victoria, defeating David Bleakley MP of the Northern Ireland Labour Party. In 1966, he was appointed as an Assistant Whip, then in 1968 as Chief Whip. From 1969 to 1971 he was the Minister of Commerce, becoming Minister of Development from 1971 to 1972.

At the 1973 Northern Ireland Assembly election, Bradford was elected in Belfast East. He sided in favour of the Sunningdale Agreement and remained loyal to Brian Faulkner, and was Minister in charge of the Department of the Environment until June 1974. He stood unsuccessfully in North Down at the February 1974 general election. He followed Brian Faulkner into the Unionist Party of Northern Ireland after the collapse of the power-sharing executive, but in June 1974 he returned to the UUP. He was not elected to the 1975 Northern Ireland Constitutional Convention.

Bradford completed a second novel, Last Ditch, in 1982. In 1989, he was elected to North Down Borough Council, where he joined his wife, Hazel, in the UUP group. He worked as a journalist, writing an influential weekly column in the Belfast News Letter and also served as a councillor and Mayor of North Down. In 1996, he was an unsuccessful candidate in the Northern Ireland Forum election in North Down.

His papers were deposited in the Public Record Office of Northern Ireland. Roy and Hazel Bradford's son, Conor Bradford, is a presenter of Good Morning Ulster for BBC Northern Ireland.

Parliament of Northern Ireland
Preceded by David Bleakley	Member of Parliament for Belfast Victoria; 1965–1973	Parliament abolished
Northern Ireland Assembly (1973)
New assembly	Assembly Member for East Belfast; 1973–1974	Assembly abolished
Party political offices
Preceded by Isaac George Hawthorne	Unionist Assistant Whip; 1966–1967; With: Samuel Magowan	Succeeded by Samuel Magowan
Vacant Title last held by James Chichester-Clark	Unionist Chief Whip; 1968–1969	Succeeded by John Dobson
Political offices
Preceded by Isaac George Hawthorne	Assistant Parliamentary Secretary to the Ministry of Finance; 1966–1967; With: Samuel Magowan	Succeeded by Samuel Magowan
Political offices
Vacant	Parliamentary Secretary to the Ministry of Education; 1967–1968	Office abolished
Vacant Title last held by James Chichester-Clark	Parliamentary Secretary to the Ministry of Finance; 1968–1969	Office abolished
Preceded by Brian Faulkner	Minister of Commerce and Production; 1969–1971	Succeeded by Robin Bailie
Civic offices
Preceded by Brian Wilson	Mayor of North Down; 1994–95	Succeeded by Susan O'Brien
