= James Craig, 1st Viscount Craigavon =

Northern Irish Unionist politician (1871–1940)

The Right Honourable The Viscount Craigavon PC PC (NI) DL
- Craig in 1917

1st Prime Minister of Northern Ireland
- In office 7 June 1921 – 24 November 1940
- Monarchs: George V Edward VIII; George VI
- Governor: The Duke of Abercorn
- Preceded by: Office established
- Succeeded by: J. M. Andrews

4th Leader of the Ulster Unionist Party
- In office 7 June 1921 – 24 November 1940
- Preceded by: Sir Edward Carson
- Succeeded by: J. M. Andrews
Ministerial positions
Parliamentary and Financial Secretary to the Admiralty
In office 2 April 1920 – 1 April 1921
Prime Minister	David Lloyd George
Preceded by	Thomas James Macnamara
Succeeded by	Leo Amery
Parliamentary Secretary to the Minister for Pensions
In office 10 January 1919 – 2 April 1920
Prime Minister	David Lloyd George
Preceded by	Arthur Griffith-Boscawen
Succeeded by	George Tryon
Treasurer of the Household
In office 14 December 1916 – 22 January 1918
Prime Minister	David Lloyd George
Preceded by	James Hope
Succeeded by	Robert Sanders
Northern Ireland Parliament
Member of the Northern Ireland Parliament for North Down
In office 22 May 1929 – 24 November 1940
Preceded by	Constituency established
Succeeded by	Thomas Bailie
Member of the Northern Ireland Parliament for Down
In office 24 May 1921 – 22 May 1929
Preceded by	Constituency established
Succeeded by	Constituency abolished
British Parliament
Member of the House of Lords Lord Temporal
In office 1 January 1927 – 24 November 1940; Hereditary Peerage
Succeeded by	The 2nd Viscount Craigavon
Member of Parliament for Mid Down
In office 14 December 1918 – 2 July 1921
Preceded by	Constituency established
Succeeded by	Robert Sharman-Crawford
Member of Parliament for East Down
In office 8 February 1906 – 14 December 1918
Preceded by	James Wood
Succeeded by	Sir David Reid

Personal details
- Born: 8 January 1871 Belfast, Ireland
- Died: 24 November 1940 (aged 69) Glencraig, Northern Ireland
- Resting place: Stormont Parliament Buildings
- Party: Ulster Unionist Party
- Spouse: Cecil Mary Tupper
- Children: 3
- Education: Merchiston

Military service
- Allegiance: United Kingdom
- Branch/service: British Army
- Years of service: 1899–1901
- Rank: Captain
- Unit: 3rd (Militia) Royal Irish Rifles
- Battles/wars: Second Boer War

James Craig, 1st Viscount Craigavon, PC, PC (NI), DL (8 January 1871 – 24 November 1940), was a leading Irish unionist and a key architect of Northern Ireland as a devolved region within the United Kingdom. During the Home Rule Crisis of 1912–14, he defied the British government in preparing an armed resistance in Ulster to an all-Ireland parliament. He accepted partition as a final settlement, securing the opt out of six Ulster counties from the dominion statehood accorded Ireland under the terms of the 1921 Anglo-Irish Treaty. From then until his death in 1940, he led the Ulster Unionist Party and served Northern Ireland as its first Prime Minister. He publicly characterised his administration as a "Protestant" counterpart to the "Catholic state" nationalists had established in the south. Craig was created a baronet in 1918 and raised to the Peerage in 1927.

== Early life ==
Craig was born at Sydenham, Belfast, the son of James Craig (1828–1900), a wealthy whiskey distiller who had entered the firm of Dunville & Co as a clerk: by age 40 he was a millionaire and a partner in the firm. James Craig Snr. owned a large house called Craigavon, overlooking Belfast Lough. His mother, Eleanor Gilmore Browne, was the daughter of Robert Browne, a prosperous man who owned property in Belfast and a farm outside Lisburn. Craig was the seventh child and sixth son in the family; there were eight sons and one daughter in all.

He was educated at Merchiston Castle School in Edinburgh, Scotland; his father had taken a conscious decision not to send his sons to any of the more fashionable public schools. After school he began work as a stockbroker, eventually opening his own firm in Belfast.

== Military career ==
Craig enlisted in the 3rd (Militia) battalion of the Royal Irish Rifles on 17 January 1900 to serve in the Second Boer War. He was seconded to the Imperial Yeomanry, a cavalry force created for service during the war, as a lieutenant in the 13th battalion on 24 February 1900, and left Liverpool for South Africa on the SS Cymric in March 1900. After arrival he was soon sent to the front, and was taken prisoner in May 1900, but released by the Boers because of a perforated colon. On his recovery he became deputy assistant director of the Imperial Military Railways, showing the qualities of organisation that were to mark his involvement in both British and Ulster politics. In June 1901 he was sent home suffering from dysentery, and by the time he was fit for service again the war was over. He was promoted to captain in the 3rd Royal Irish Rifles on 20 September 1902, while still seconded to South Africa.

Service in South Africa is said to have made Craig far more politically aware and "had given him a heightened awareness of the Empire and a pride in Ulster's place in it".

== Politics ==
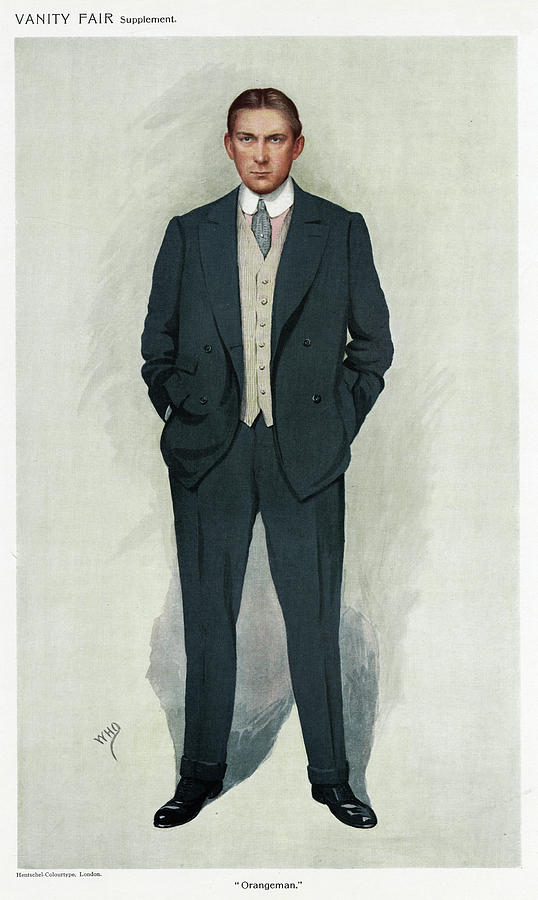
Craig caricatured by WHO for Vanity Fair, 1911

=== Leader of Ulster opposition to Irish Home Rule ===
On his return to Ireland, having received a £100,000 legacy from his father's will, he turned to politics. Following his brother Charles who had successfully stood as an Irish Unionist in a by-election in South Antrim the previous month, in the March 1903 by-election Craig attempted to secure the unionist seat of North Fermanagh. Unlike his brother, he narrowly failed to defeat his Russellite rival (Edward Mitchell). He had to wait until the 1906 General Election to win his first seat, East Down (the constituency he represented until returned from Mid Down in 1918). Already he was playing a leading organisational role for Irish Unionism in Ulster.

In 1905, he had co-founded the Ulster Unionist Council to coalesce loyalist opposition to Irish Home Rule in the northern Ulster province. In this task he regarded the contribution of the parading Orange Order (that commanded 50 of 200 seats on the council) as key. Opening an Orange Hall in after the 1906 election he declared that he was "an Orangeman first and a Member of Parliament afterwards" and called for "the Protestant community to rally around the [Orange] lodges, strengthen and support them".

In 1912, Craig helped orchestrate "Ulster Day". In a massed demonstration in Belfast, Edward Carson, the Dublin barrister he had nominated for the leadership of the UUC, led in signing the Ulster Covenant. The signatories pledged "to stand by one another in defending for ourselves and our children our position of equal citizenship in the United Kingdom", and to use "all means which may be found necessary to defeat the present conspiracy to set up a Home Rule Parliament in Ireland".

In January 1913, unable to prevent passage of the Liberal government's Home Rule Bill at Westminster, the UUC called for the exclusion of Ulster from its provisions, a demand backed with a call for up to 100,000 Covenanters to be drilled and armed as Ulster Volunteers. On 23 September, Craig persuaded Carson to accept Chairmanship of a Provisional Government which he had planned and primed to assume the administration of Ulster should the Government move to enforce the authority of a new Dublin parliament.

In April 1914, Craig supported Major Frederick Crawford in arming the Ulster Volunteers (UVF) with rifles and ammunition purchased, and smuggled, from Imperial Germany. Years later (1934) in a speech in the House of Commons of Northern Ireland the political leader of the Northern Ireland Nationalists Cahir Healy spoke of Craig's support in the arming of Loyalists and the potential for armed resistance to the Government of Ireland Act 1914:

"Did not the Irish Republican Army march in the footsteps of the gentleman who is now the King's Prime Minister in Northern Ireland? I shall be told your treason was of the conditional type. You knew and Sir Edward Carson knew you would never be obliged to make good in the flesh your promises to the mob. And you were right in that. For you and the ringleaders in rebellion, there was to be the Government Bench and the profitable post of a law lord. For Casement, Pearse, Connolly and the rest there was a bullet at dawn and a grave of quick lime. That is how justice is administered...When treason prospers men do not call it treason. Treason has prospered with you. You have achieved place and power by treason."

=== On women's suffrage ===
In 1912, Craig broke with other Irish MPs, both unionist and nationalist, in voting for the Conciliation bill that would have extended the parliamentary vote (albeit on a restrictive property basis) for the first time to women. Consistent with the prominent role in mobilising opposition to home rule played by the Ulster Women's Unionist Council (UWUC), and the invitation to women to sign their own declaration in support of the Ulster Covenant, in September 1913 Craig's UUC informed the Women's Council that the draft articles for the Provisional Government included provisions for female suffrage.

When in the spring of 1914, Carson, seeming to overrule Craig, made it clear that a potentially divisive endorsement of votes for women was not a political option for unionism, Dorothy Evans, organiser in Belfast for Women's Social and Political Union declared an end to "the truce" that the organisation had "held in Ulster". In the months that followed WSPU militants were implicated in a series of outrages against property that, in addition to arson attacks on Unionist-owned buildings and on male recreational and sports facilities, included forced entry into Craig's home.

On 3 April 1913 police raided the flat in Belfast Evans was sharing with local activist Midge Muir, and found explosives. In court, five days later, the pair created uproar when they demanded to know why the gun-runner Craig was not appearing on the same charges.

=== Wartime government service ===
Following the United Kingdom declaration of war upon Germany in August 1914, Craig persuaded Lord Kitchener to remould the UVF into the 36th Ulster Division. He was given the rank of lieutenant-colonel, but unift for front line service he resigned his commission at the end of 1916 and took up a junior post, Treasurer of the Household, in the wartime coalition government of Lloyd George. He spoke in favour of conscripting Irishmen into the army in 1918 as the Government looked to extend the Military Services Act.

After the World War, Craig continued in the service of the coalition government first as Parliamentary Secretary to the Minister for Pensions (1919–1920) and then Parliamentary Secretary to the Admiralty (1920–21). In February 1921, with the war of independence underway in the south, Craig succeeded Edward Carson as leader of the Ulster Unionist Party.

=== Proponent of a devolved Belfast administration ===
Craig persuaded his fellow Unionists and the British Government that if exclusion, and thus partition, was to be the solution to the challenge posed by the Catholic-majority desire for Irish self government, it should apply to only six of the nine Ulster counties. In three, Donegal, Cavan and Monaghan, he argued Sinn Féiners would make government "absolutely impossible for us". He also led Ulster Unionists in accepting that the six counties—Northern Ireland as they were to become—should have their own home-rule parliament in Belfast.

Writing to Prime Minister David Lloyd George, Craig had declared that it was only as a "sacrifice in the interest of peace" that unionists would accept a Northern Ireland parliament they had not asked for. But in debating the Government of Ireland Bill 1920, Craig noted that having "all the paraphernalia of Government" might make it more difficult for future Liberal and/or Labour government to push Northern Ireland against the will of its majority into all-Ireland arrangements Once Unionists had their own parliament, Craig felt able to assure his followers "no power on earth would ever be able to touch them".

In an early 1922 meeting with Michael Collins (the Chairman of the Provisional Government of the Irish Free State), Craig made it clear that some Nationalist majority locations (such as Derry City and Enniskillen, County Fermanagh) would never be transferred to the Irish Free State due to their historic and sentimental importance to Protestants. To make such assurance against British pressure for Irish unity doubly sure, in November 1921 Craig suggested to Lloyd George that Northern Ireland's status be changed to that of a Crown dominion outside of the United Kingdom. Although in signing the Anglo-Irish Treaty, only weeks later the Prime Minister conceded Southern Ireland precisely this Canada-style form of statehood, to Craig he replied that he was not willing to give "the character of an international boundary" to "a frontier based neither upon natural features nor broad geographical considerations".

Lloyd George was nonetheless persuaded in October 1920 to secure that still unsettled frontier by endorsing Craig's proposal for a new "volunteer constabulary ... raised from the loyal population" and "armed for duty within the six county area only". Into this Ulster Special Constabulary former UVF units were "incorporated en masse".

=== Prime Minister of Northern Ireland ===
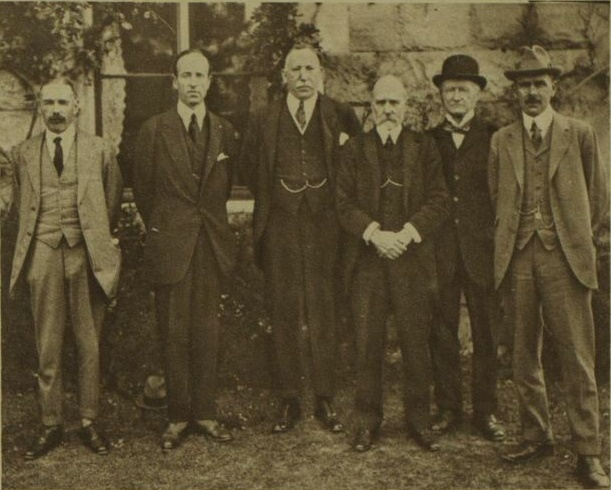
Craig (third from left) with his first cabinet, in 1921

In the 1921 Northern Ireland general election, the first ever, Craig was elected to the newly created Northern Ireland House of Commons as one of the members for County Down. On 7 June 1921, Craig was appointed the first Prime Minister of Northern Ireland by the Lord Lieutenant of Ireland. The House of Commons of Northern Ireland assembled for the first time later that day. By 1932 opposition to some of Craig's policies became more direct. Opposition leader Cahir Healy pointed out the sectarian nature of the Prime Minister's rule:

We know how it began. He began by interning 500 Nationalists, many of them from the most peaceful parts of the Six Counties, but not a single man of his own gunmen in Belfast were interned. He began by gerrymandering local government areas, even in places where the Nationalists in relation to the Protestants were as two and a quarter to one. They were left without any control of the local councils. He drove the Nationalists out of every public position where it was possible to do so, and he made, and continues to make, public appointments on sectarian and political grounds, totally ignoring merit. That is how he began and that is how he continues.

In April 1934, in response to George Leeke's question regarding the Protestant nature of the Unionist dominated parliament, Craig famously replied:

The hon. Member must remember that in the South they boasted of a Catholic State. They still boast of Southern Ireland being a Catholic State. All I boast of is that we are a Protestant Parliament and a Protestant State. It would be rather interesting for historians of the future to compare a Catholic State launched in the South with a Protestant State launched in the North and to see which gets on the better and prospers the more. It is most interesting for me at the moment to watch how they are progressing. I am doing my best always to top the bill and to be ahead of the South.

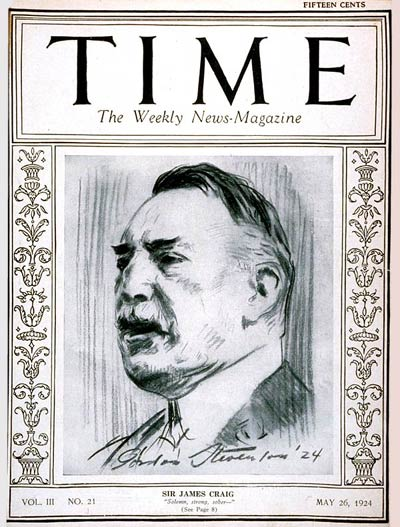
Time cover, 26 May 1924

This speech is often misquoted, intentionally or otherwise, as: "A Protestant Parliament for a Protestant People", and conflated with an incident which occurred respective to the naming of the New City of Craigavon. Knockmena (a corruption of the townland name, Knockmenagh) was the preferred name nationalists hoped would be used, and which might have attracted broad acceptance on both sides. On 6 July 1965, it was announced that the new city would be named Craigavon after Craig. A noted nationalist, Joseph Connellan, interrupted the announcement with the comment, "A Protestant city for a Protestant people".

Later that year, speaking in the House of Commons at Stormont on 21 November 1934 in response to an accusation that all government appointments in Northern Ireland were carried out on a religious basis, he replied: "... it is undoubtedly our duty and our privilege, and always will be, to see that those appointed by us possess the most unimpeachable loyalty to the King and Constitution. That is my whole object in carrying on a Protestant Government for a Protestant people. I repeat it in this House".

He was made a baronet in 1918, and in 1927 was created Viscount Craigavon, of Stormont in the County of Down. He was also the recipient of honorary degrees from The Queen's University of Belfast (1922) and Oxford University (1926).

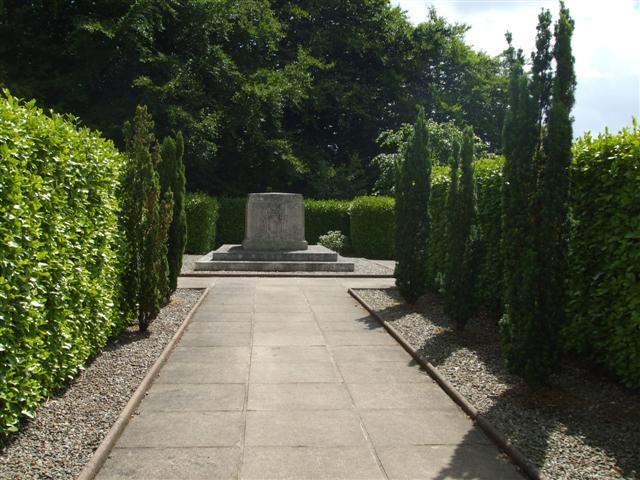
Lord Craigavon's tomb, Stormont Parliament grounds

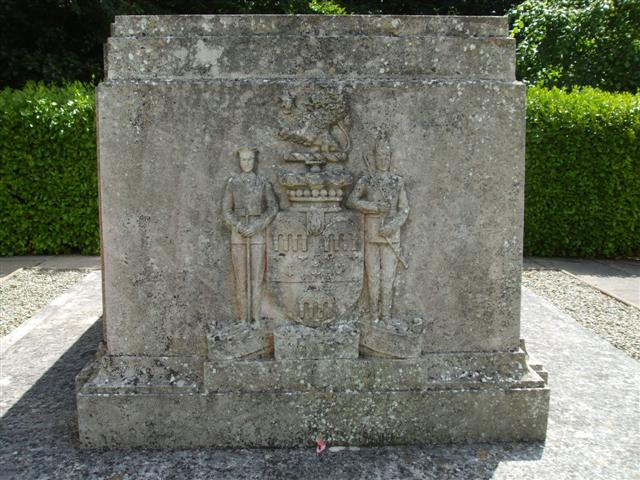
Close-up of the tomb carving

Craig had made his career in British as well as Northern Irish politics; but his premiership showed little sign of his earlier close acquaintance with the British political world. He became intensely parochial, and suffered from his loss of intimacy with British politicians in 1938, when the British government concluded agreements with Dublin to end the Anglo-Irish economic war between the two countries. He never tried to persuade Westminster to protect Northern Ireland's industries, especially the linen industry, which was central to its economy. He was anxious not to provoke Westminster, given the precarious state of Northern Ireland's position.

He admitted privately around 1938 that partition was unlikely to last saying, "In this island we cannot live always separated from one another. We are too small to be apart or for the border to be there for all time. The change will not come in my time but it will come." In April 1939, and again in May 1940 in the Second World War, he called for conscription to be introduced in Northern Ireland (which the British government, fearing a backlash from nationalists, refused). He also called for Churchill to invade Ireland, alternatively known as Éire, using Scottish and Welsh troops in order to seize the valuable ports and install a Governor-General at Dublin. Lady Londonderry confided to Sir Samuel Hoare, the Home Secretary until the outbreak of the war, that Craigavon had become "ga-ga" but Craigavon was still Prime Minister when he died peacefully at his home at Glencraig, County Down, at the age of 69. He was buried on the Stormont Estate on 5 December 1940, and was succeeded as the Prime Minister of Northern Ireland by the Minister of Finance, J. M. Andrews.

Craig had a dual Irish-British self-identity, saying in a 1929 parliamentary debate that "We are Irishmen ... always hold that Ulstermen are Irishmen and the best of Irishmen – much the best".

== Personal life ==
His wife, Cecil Mary Nowell Dering Tupper (Viscountess Craigavon), whom he married on 22 March 1905 after a very brief courtship, was English, the daughter of Sir Daniel Tupper, assistant comptroller of the Lord Chamberlain's department of the king's household, and a fourth cousin of the future Queen Mother, Elizabeth Angela Marguerite Bowes-Lyon. They had twin sons and a daughter. A president of the Ulster Women's Unionist Council, she was created a Dame Commander of the Order of the British Empire in 1941.

Craigavon was succeeded as second viscount by his elder son, James (1906–1974). His estate was valued at £3,228, 2s., 6d. effects in England: probate, 20 March 1941, CGPLA NIre., £24, 138 9s. 9d.: probate, 3 March 1941, CGPLA NIre.

Craig had a keen interest in Ulster Agriculture and was vice-president of Listooder and District Ploughing Society (the oldest in Ireland) from November 1906 until November 1921 and continued to present the all-Ireland cup class until 1926.

== Arms ==
Coat of arms of James Craig, 1st Viscount Craigavon
Notes Coat of arms of the Craig family Crest A demi-lion rampant per fess Gules and Sable holding in the dexter paw a mullet Or. Escutcheon Gules a fess Ermine between three bridges of as many arches Proper. Supporters Dexter a Constable of the Ulster Special Constabulary his hand resting on a rifle Proper sinister a Private of the Royal Ulster Rifles armed and accoutred also Proper. Motto Charity Provokes Charity

== See also ==
- Belfast Blitz
- The Emergency
- List of Northern Ireland Members of the House of Lords
- Craigavon, the planned town named after Craig

== Notes ==
Parliament of the United Kingdom
Preceded by James Wood	Member of Parliament for East Down; 1906–1918	Succeeded by David Reid
New constituency	Member of Parliament for Mid Down; 1918–1921	Succeeded by Robert Sharman-Crawford
Political offices
Preceded by James Hope	Treasurer of the Household; 1916–1918	Vacant Title next held by Robert Sanders
Preceded by Thomas Macnamara	Parliamentary and Financial Secretary to the Admiralty; 1920–1921	Succeeded by Leo Amery
New office	Prime Minister of Northern Ireland; 1921–1940	Succeeded by J. M. Andrews
Parliament of Northern Ireland
New constituency	Member of Parliament for Down; 1921–1929; With: J. M. Andrews; Éamon de Valera; Thomas Lavery; Robert McBride; Thomas McMullan; Harry Mulholland; Patrick O'Neill	Constituency abolished
New constituency	Member of Parliament for North Down; 1929–1940	Succeeded by Thomas Bailie
Party political offices
Preceded by Edward Carson	Leader of the Ulster Unionist Party; 1921–1940	Succeeded by J. M. Andrews
Peerage of the United Kingdom
New creation	Viscount Craigavon; 1927–1940	Succeeded by James Craig
Baronetage of the United Kingdom
New creation	Baronet (of Craigavon); 1918–1940	Succeeded by James Craig
Awards and achievements
Preceded by Henry Seidel Canby	Cover of Time Magazine; 26 May 1924	Succeeded by Alfred von Tirpitz
