= Mid Down (Northern Ireland Parliament constituency) =

Coordinates: 54.496°N 5.916°W

- Former County constituency for the Parliament of Northern Ireland

Former constituency
- Created: 1929
- Abolished: 1973
- Election method: First past the post

Mid Down was a constituency of the Parliament of Northern Ireland.

== Boundaries ==
Mid Down was a county constituency comprising part of northern County Down, immediately south east of Belfast. It was created when the House of Commons (Method of Voting and Redistribution of Seats) Act (Northern Ireland) 1929 introduced first-past-the-post elections throughout Northern Ireland. Mid Down was created by the division of Down into eight new constituencies. The constituency survived unchanged until 1969, when it was considerably reduced in size, with areas of the seat being transferred to Lagan Valley and North Down. It returned one Member of Parliament until the Parliament of Northern Ireland was temporarily suspended in 1972, and then formally abolished in 1973.

The seat comprised parts of the rural districts of Castlereagh, Hillsborough and Newtownards.

== Politics ==
The seat had a substantial unionist majority and was always won by Ulster Unionist Party candidates. It was only contested on one occasion, by a Northern Ireland Labour Party candidate who received only 23% of the votes cast.

== Members of Parliament ==
Elected	Party	Name
1929	UUP	J. M. Andrews
1953	UUP	Jack Andrews
1964	UUP	Basil Kelly

== Election results ==
At the 1929, 1933, 1938, 1945 and 1949 Northern Ireland general elections, J. M. Andrews was elected unopposed.

At the 1953, 1958 and 1962 Northern Ireland general elections, Jack Andrews was elected unopposed.

Mid Down by-election, 1964
Party	Candidate	Votes	%	±%
UUP	Basil Kelly	8,674	77.1	N/A
NI Labour	J. S. Gardner	2,572	22.9	New
Majority		6,102	54.2	N/A
Turnout		11,246	27.2	N/A
UUP hold		Swing	N/A	

At the 1965 and 1969 Northern Ireland general elections, Basil Kelly was elected unopposed.
