= Samuel Magowan =

Politician from Northern Ireland (1910–1976)

Member of Parliament for Iveagh
- In office 1964–1973

Personal details
- Born: 5 February 1910
- Died: 1976 (aged 65–66)
- Political party: Ulster Unionist

Samuel Magowan (5 February 1910 – 1976) was an Ulster Unionist member of the Parliament of Northern Ireland. He represented Iveagh from 1964 to 1973.

He was a shopkeeper and a member of Hillsborough Rural District Council from 1955 to 1964.

He served as Assistant Whip from 1966 until 1972, also holding the office of Assistant Parliamentary Secretary at the Ministry of Finance from 1966 to 1969.

== Sources ==
- Biographies of Members of the Northern Ireland House of Commons
- The Government of Northern Ireland

Parliament of Northern Ireland
Preceded by Brian Maginess	Member of Parliament for Iveagh; 1964–1973	Parliament abolished
Party political offices
Preceded by Isaac George Hawthorne	Unionist Assistant Whip; 1966–1969; With: Roy Bradford 1966; Joseph Burns 1968–1969; John William Kennedy 1969	Office abolished
Political offices
Preceded by Isaac George Hawthorne	Assistant Parliamentary Secretary to the Ministry of Finance; 1966–1969; With: Roy Bradford 1966; Joseph Burns 1968–1969; John William Kennedy 1969	Office abolished
