= Michael Keogh (politician) =

Northern Irish politician

Michael Keogh, known as Max Keogh (1917 – April 2001), was a nationalist politician and journalist in Northern Ireland.

Based in Newry, Keogh became the editor of the Frontier Sentinel.

Keogh was elected to Newry Urban District Council, as a member of the Anti-Partition League of Ireland, and became chairman in 1949, holding the post until 1958. He was succeeded by a war of Independence veteran, Tom Kelly, following the Irish Labour Party landslide. He held various posts in the Nationalist Party, including Secretary of the party's Executive from 1966. He was also elected Secretary of the Newry branch of Unity.

In 1967, Keogh was elected to the Parliament of Northern Ireland, representing the Nationalists in South Down. He held his seat until the Parliament was abolished in 1973. He was invited to join the Social Democratic and Labour Party on its formation, but chose to remain a Nationalist Party member.

Parliament of Northern Ireland
Preceded by Joseph Connellan	Member of Parliament for South Down; 1967–1973	Parliament abolished
