= Basil Kelly =

Northern Irish barrister, judge and politician

The Right Honourable Sir Basil Kelly QC

Member of Parliament for Mid Down
- In office 1964–1973

Attorney General for Northern Ireland
- In office 1968–1972

Personal details
- Born: John William Basil Kelly; 10 May 1920 Clones, Ireland
- Died: 5 December 2008 (aged 88) Berkshire, England
- Party: Ulster Unionist
- Education: Trinity College, Dublin

Sir John William Basil Kelly, PC, PC (NI), QC (10 May 1920 – 5 December 2008) was a Northern Irish barrister, judge and politician.

== Life ==
Basil Kelly was born into an Ulster Protestant family in the townland of Corkeenan, on the outskirts of Clones in the west of County Monaghan, on 10 May 1920 as one of the two children, and the only son, of Thomas William Kelly and Emily Frances Kelly (née Donaldson). His parents were small farmers in West Monaghan, who had their house 'burnt out' during the revolutionary period in Ireland in the early 1920s. Shortly after this, the family moved, around 1925, north-east to Belfast, settling in a working-class area of East Belfast, where Basil and his sister were raised. Here he attended Mersey Street Primary School, where he later won a scholarship to the prestigious Methodist College, Belfast, later receiving his university education at Trinity College, Dublin (TCD). He was called to the Northern Irish Bar in 1944 and took silk in 1958. He served as senior Crown Counsel in counties Tyrone, Fermanagh and Armagh from 1958 to 1968.

== Later career ==
In 1964, he was elected to the House of Commons of Northern Ireland as Ulster Unionist member for Mid Down. He was appointed as Attorney General for Northern Ireland in 1968. He was appointed to the Privy Council of Northern Ireland in 1969, entitling him to the style The Right Honourable.

In March 1972, the entire Government of Northern Ireland resigned, and the Parliament of Northern Ireland was prorogued. As a result, Kelly ceased to be Attorney General. The office of Attorney General for Northern Ireland was transferred to the Attorney General for England and Wales, and Kelly was the last person to serve as Stormont's Attorney General until the re-establishment of the position in its own right in April 2010. In 1973, he was appointed as a judge of the High Court of Northern Ireland, and then as a Lord Justice of Appeal of Northern Ireland in 1984, when he was also knighted and appointed to the Privy Council of the United Kingdom.

At the Institute of Professional Legal Studies, Queen's University Belfast, a tutorial room was named in his honour.

== Death ==
Lord Justice Sir Basil Kelly died at his home in Berkshire on 5 December 2008 after a short illness. He was 88 years old.

== Sources ==
- Flackes, W.D. and Elliott, S. (1989), Northern Ireland: A Political Directory (3rd ed.). Belfast: Blackstaff Press Ltd

Parliament of Northern Ireland
Preceded by Jack Andrews	Member of Parliament for Mid Down; 1964–1973	Parliament abolished
Political offices
Preceded by Edward Warburton Jones	Attorney General for Northern Ireland; 1968–1972	Succeeded by Sir Peter Rawlinson
