= C. H. Mullan =

Judge and politician in Northern Ireland (1912–1996)

Member of Parliament for Down
- In office 1946-1950 Serving with Sir W. D. Smiles

Personal details
- Born: Charles Heron Mullan; 17 February 1912
- Died: 26 October 1996 (aged 84)
- Party: Unionist
- Education: University of Cambridge
- Military career
- Allegiance: United Kingdom
- Branch: Navy
- Service years: 1937-1951
- Rank: Lieutenant Commander
- Conflicts: World War II

Charles Heron Mullan CBE DL (17 February 1912 – 26 October 1996), known as C. H. Mullan, was a judge and unionist politician in Northern Ireland.

== Biography ==
Mullan studied at Rossall School, then read law at Clare College, Cambridge, graduating in 1934. He joined the Royal Naval Volunteer Reserve in 1937 and was called up on the outbreak of World War II, soon becoming a lieutenant. He served on HMS Rodney and HMS Lewes before becoming a naval liaison officer with the Royal Norwegian Navy.

At the 1945 Northern Ireland general election, Mullan unsuccessfully contested South Down for the Ulster Unionist Party. However, he was elected to the Westminster Parliament at the 1946 Down by-election. He then became a member of the Ulster Unionist Council. In 1948, he qualified as a solicitor. He was also promoted to Lieutenant Commander.

The Down constituency was abolished in 1950, and Mullan did not stand for an alternative seat. In 1951, he left the Royal Navy. He remained a member of the Ulster Unionist Council until 1960, when he became a magistrate. In 1974, he served as Deputy Lieutenant of County Down, and in 1979 he was appointed a CBE.

Parliament of the United Kingdom
Preceded by James Little; Sir W. D. Smiles	Member of Parliament for Down; 1946–1950; With: Sir W. D. Smiles	Constituency abolished
