= Godfrey Mulholland =

Irish cricketer

Personal information
- Full name: Godfrey John Arthur Murray Lyle Mulholland
- Born: 3 October 1892; Bellaghy, Ireland
- Died: 1 March 1948 (aged 55); St Pancras, London, England
- Batting: Unknown
- Relatives: Sir Henry Mulholland (brother)

Domestic team information
- Years: Team
- 1912: Cambridge University

Career statistics
Competition	First-class
Matches	1
Runs scored	9
Batting average	9.00
100s/50s	–/–
Top score	6
Catches/stumpings	1/–
- Source: Cricinfo, 9 January 2022

Godfrey John Arthur Murray Lyle Mulholland MC (3 October 1892 – 1 March 1948) was an Irish first-class cricketer, civil servant, British Army officer and banking director.

The son of Henry Mulholland, 2nd Baron Dunleath, he was born at the family estate near Bellaghy in October 1892. He was educated at Eton College, before going up to Trinity College, Cambridge. While studying at Cambridge, Mulholland made a single appearance in first-class cricket for Cambridge University Cricket Club against the touring South Africans at Fenner's in 1912. Batting twice in the match, he was dismissed in the Cambridge first innings by Claude Carter for 6 runs, while in their second innings he was unbeaten on 3 runs. After graduating from Cambridge in 1913, Mulholland entered into the Colonial Office and was sent to Australia, where he served as the private secretary to John A. Gilruth, the Administrator of the Northern Territory. However, this appointment was short lived due to the beginning of the First World War in Europe.

Mulholland returned to Europe, where he served in the Royal Army Service Corps. By June 1917 he held the temporary rank of captain, while the following year he was decorated with the Military Cross. He ended the war as an adjutant, a position he vacated in June 1919. Following the war, he served as a director of the National Westminster Bank and later as a partner with the bank Edward de Stein and Company. He was married to the Hon. Olivia Vernon Harcourt, daughter of the 1st Viscount Harcourt, with the couple having three children.

Mulholland was resident in his later years at Langhurst Manor in Surrey. He died at the Royal Free Hospital at St Pancras in March 1948. His brother, Sir Henry, was also a first-class cricketer, in addition to being the Speaker of the House of Commons of Northern Ireland.
