= Herbert Whitten =

Mayor of Craigavon
- In office 1978–1979

Member of Craigavon Borough Council
- In office 30 May 1973 – 1981
- Preceded by: Council established
- Constituency: Craigavon Area B

Member of the Constitutional Convention for Armagh
- In office 1975–1976
- Preceded by: Convention established
- Succeeded by: Convention dissolved

Member of the Northern Ireland Assembly for Armagh
- In office 28 June 1973 – 1974

Member of Parliament for Central Armagh
- In office 24 February 1969 – 1972
- Preceded by: Isaac Hawthorne
- Succeeded by: Parliament abolished

Member of Portadown District Council
- In office 1968–1973
- Succeeded by: Council abolished

Personal details
- Born: 1909; Portadown, Northern Ireland
- Died: 1981
- Political party: Ulster Unionist Party

Herbert Whitten (1909–1981) was a Northern Irish unionist politician.

== Background ==
Born in Portadown, Whitten became the managing director of T. A. Shillington, a builders' merchants. He was elected to Portadown District Council as an Ulster Unionist Party member in 1968, and at the 1969 Northern Ireland general election, he was elected for Central Armagh.

In 1973, following the reorganisation of local government in Northern Ireland, Whitten was elected to Craigavon Borough Council, and he also took a seat in Armagh on the 1973 Northern Ireland Assembly. He held this seat on the Northern Ireland Constitutional Convention. In 1978–79, he served as Mayor of Craigavon.

Parliament of Northern Ireland
| Preceded by Isaac Hawthorne | Member of Parliament for Central Armagh; 1969–1973 | Parliament abolished |
Northern Ireland Assembly (1973)
| New assembly | Assembly Member for Armagh; 1973–1974 | Assembly abolished |
Northern Ireland Constitutional Convention
| New convention | Member for Armagh; 1975–1976 | Assembly abolished |
Civic offices
| Preceded by Sydney Cairns | Mayor of Craigavon; 1978–1979 | Succeeded by A. Locke |
