= Janric Craig, 3rd Viscount Craigavon =

British Crossbench politician (1944–2025)

The Right Honourable The Viscount Craigavon
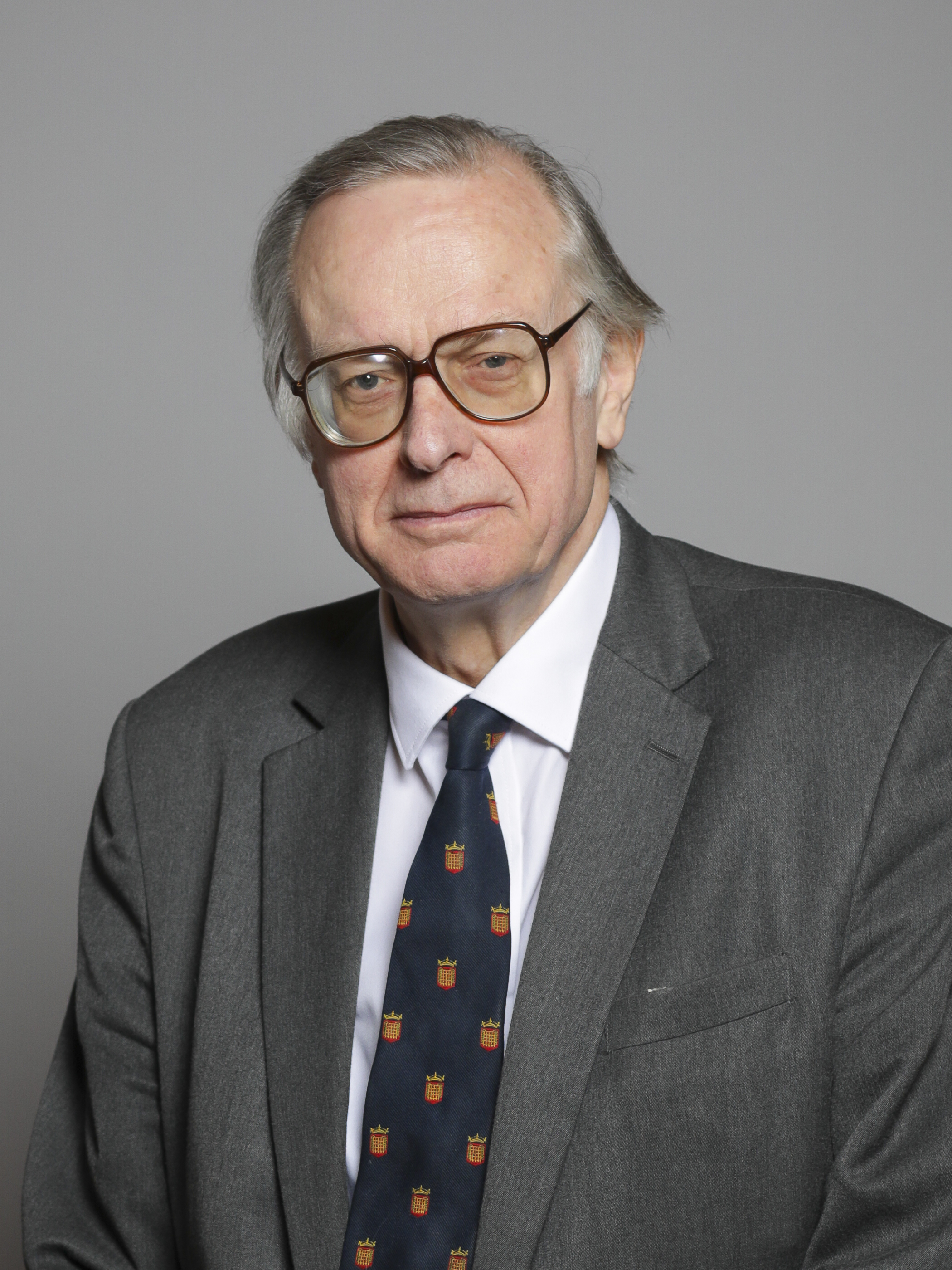

Member of the House of Lords
- Lord Temporal
- Hereditary peerage 26 July 1974 – 11 November 1999
- Preceded by: The 2nd Viscount Craigavon
- Succeeded by: Seat abolished
- Elected Hereditary Peer; 11 November 1999 – 31 March 2025
- Election: 1999
- Preceded by: Seat established
- Succeeded by: Seat abolished

Personal details
- Born: 9 June 1944
- Died: 31 March 2025 (aged 80)
- Party: Crossbench

Janric Fraser Craig, 3rd Viscount Craigavon (9 June 1944 – 31 March 2025) was a British peer and chartered accountant. He was one of the 92 hereditary peers elected to remain in the House of Lords after the passing of the House of Lords Act 1999; he sat as a crossbencher.

The son of the 2nd Viscount Craigavon, he was born into a famous Ulster family and was educated at Eton College, Berkshire, and at the University of London, where he graduated with a Bachelor of Arts and a Bachelor of Science. In 1974, he succeeded to his father's titles. Lord Craigavon was a member of the Executive Committee of the Anglo-Austrian Society. He was made a Commander of the Order of the Lion of Finland in 1998, a Commander of the Swedish Royal Order of the Polar Star in the following year and a Knight of the Danish Order of the Dannebrog in 2006.

Craig was a onetime trustee of the Progress Educational Trust, and was later an adviser for the Trust. He was a patron of Humanists UK, sitting in the Parliamentary Humanists group.

Craig died on 31 March 2025, at the age of 80. His title became extinct upon his death.

== Arms ==
Coat of arms of Janric Craig, 3rd Viscount Craigavon
Notes Coat of arms of the Craig family Crest A demi-lion rampant per fess Gules and Sable holding in the dexter paw a mullet Or. Escutcheon Gules a fess Ermine between three bridges of as many arches Proper. Supporters Dexter a Constable of the Ulster Special Constabulary his hand resting on a rifle Proper sinister a Private of the Royal Ulster Rifles armed and accoutred also Proper. Motto Charity Provokes Charity

== Sources ==
- "DodOnline". Archived from the original on 8 February 2007.

Peerage of the United Kingdom
Preceded by James Craig	Viscount Craigavon; 1974–2025; Member of the House of Lords (1974–1999)	Extinct
Parliament of the United Kingdom
New office created by the House of Lords Act 1999	Elected hereditary peer to the House of Lords under the House of Lords Act 1999; 1999–2025	Vacant
