= February 1922 North Down by-election =

UK parliamentary by-election

The February 1922 North Down by-election was held on 21 February 1922. The by-election was held due to the appointment of the incumbent Ulster Unionist Party MP, Thomas Watters Brown, as a judge to the High Court of Justice in Northern Ireland. It was won unopposed by the Ulster Unionist Party candidate Henry Hughes Wilson. Wilson was assassinated four months later, leading to the July 1922 North Down by-election.

== Result ==
February 1922 North Down by-election
Party	Candidate	Votes	%	±%
UUP	Henry Wilson	Unopposed		
Registered electors				
UUP hold				
