= Viscount Craigavon =

Title in the Peerage of the United Kingdom

James Craig, 1st Viscount Craigavon

Viscount Craigavon, of Stormont in the County of Down, was a title in the Peerage of the United Kingdom. It was created in 1927 for Sir James Craig, 1st Baronet, the Prime Minister of Northern Ireland. He had already been created a baronet, 'of Craigavon, (Note: Meaning Craigavon House, not to be confused with the planned town of Craigavon, County Armagh named in honour of the 1st Viscount) in the County of Down' in 1918. The titles were last held by his grandson, the third Viscount, who succeeded his father in 1974. He was one of the ninety elected hereditary peers that remained in the House of Lords after the passing of the House of Lords Act 1999, and sat as a crossbencher. The title became extinct upon the 3rd Viscount's death.

The family seat was Craigavon House at Sydenham in the County Down portion of Belfast.

== Viscounts Craigavon (1927) ==
- James Craig, 1st Viscount Craigavon (1871–1940)
- James Craig, 2nd Viscount Craigavon (1906–1974)
- Janric Fraser Craig, 3rd Viscount Craigavon (1944–2025)

== Arms ==
Coat of arms of Viscount Craigavon
Notes Coat of arms of the Craig family Crest A demi-lion rampant per fess Gules and Sable holding in the dexter paw a mullet Or. Escutcheon Gules a fess Ermine between three bridges of as many arches Proper. Supporters Dexter a Constable of the Ulster Special Constabulary his hand resting on a rifle Proper sinister a Private of the Royal Ulster Rifles armed and accoutred also Proper. Motto Charity Provokes Charity
