= Daniel Hall Christie =

Northern Irish politician

Daniel Hall Christie CBE

Member of the Northern Ireland Parliament for North Londonderry
- In office 1933–1938

High Sheriff of County Londonderry
- In office 1943–1943

Mayor of Coleraine

Personal details
- Born: 1881
- Died: 1965 (aged 83–84)
- Party: Ulster Unionist Party

Daniel Hall Christie (1881–1965) was a politician in County Londonderry, Northern Ireland.

Christie was a member of Londonderry County and Coleraine Borough councils, chairman of Coleraine Urban Council, the first recipient of the Freedom of the Borough of Coleraine (1928), the first mayor of Coleraine, an Ulster Unionist member of the House of Commons of Northern Ireland (the lower house of the Parliament of Northern Ireland; 1933–1938) and High Sheriff of County Londonderry (1943). He was also a member of the Northern Ireland General Health Services Board (1948). He was awarded a CBE in the 1950 Birthday Honours, for public services in Northern Ireland.

He was married to Jessie Eliza Parker, youngest daughter of English engineer and scientist Thomas Parker.

== Legacy ==
The D.H. Christie Memorial Primary School in Coleraine was established in 1967 and named after Christie, recognising his public service and contributions to the Coleraine area.

Parliament of Northern Ireland
Preceded by John Martin Mark	Member of Parliament for North Londonderry; 1933–1938	Succeeded by Robert Moore
