= David John Little =

David John Little KC (d. 16 April 1984) was an Ulster Unionist Party politician in the Parliament of Northern Ireland, a barrister and a county court judge.

Little was the son of Rev. Dr. James Little, erstwhile MP for County Down, and educated at Royal Belfast Academical Institution, St. Andrew's College, Dublin and later at Trinity College Dublin, where he graduated MA and LL.B. He was called to the Bar of Northern Ireland in 1938 and to the Inner Bar in 1963.

In 1959 he was elected to the Stormont Parliament for West Down, a seat he held until 1965. On his retirement from Parliament, he was appointed Recorder of Londonderry (1965–1979) and then a Judge for North Antrim Division (1979); he retired in 1980.

Parliament of Northern Ireland
Preceded by John Edgar Bailey	Member of Parliament for West Down; 1959–1965	Succeeded by John Dobson
