= July 1922 North Down by-election =

UK parliamentary by-election

The 1922 North Down by-election was held on 21 July 1922. The by-election was held due to the assassination of the incumbent UUP MP, Henry Wilson who had been elected in the February 1922 North Down by-election. It was won unopposed by the UUP candidate John Simms.

== Result ==
July 1922 North Down by-election
Party	Candidate	Votes	%	±%
UUP	John Simms	Unopposed		
Registered electors				
UUP hold				
