= John Edgar Bailey =

Northern Ireland politician

John Edgar Bailey (27th March 1896 – 14th November 1958) was a Unionist politician in Northern Ireland.

A farmer by profession, he was educated at private school and was a member of Down County Council. He was elected to the House of Commons of Northern Ireland from the West Down seat in 1938, and represented the constituency until his death in 1958. He served as Assistant Parliamentary Secretary to the Ministry of Finance and Assistant Whip from 1945 to 1958.

Parliament of Northern Ireland
Preceded by Samuel Fryar	Member of Parliament for West Down; 1938–1958	Succeeded by David John Little
Party political offices
Vacant Title last held by Robert Corkey	Unionist Assistant Whip; 1945–1958	Succeeded by Harry West
Political offices
Vacant	Parliamentary Secretary at the Ministry of Agriculture; 1956–1958	Succeeded by Harry West
Vacant Title last held by Robert Corkey	Assistant Parliamentary Secretary to the Ministry of Finance; 1945–1958	Succeeded by Harry West
