= James Brown (Northern Ireland politician) =

James Brown (1897 – 15 July 1969) was a Unionist politician and journalist in Northern Ireland.

Brown stood as an independent Farmers and New Industries candidate in South Down at the 1938 Northern Ireland general election. The seat had previously elected Irish nationalists, but no nationalist candidate stood in 1938, and Brown easily beat his only opponent, a Northern Ireland Labour Party candidate. He immediately took the Ulster Unionist Party whip in Parliament.

At the 1945 Northern Ireland general election, Brown contested Mourne as an independent Unionist, but was defeated by the Nationalist Party candidate James McSparran. He then stood for Down at the 1945 Westminster general election. He came last out of four candidates, but took 19.1% of the vote and was less than 2,000 votes behind the last elected candidate.

A by-election was held in Down in 1946, and Brown again stood, this time as an independent "Democratic Unionist". He again placed last, his share of the vote shrinking to 2.2%.

Brown's final political contest was in South Down at the 1958 Northern Ireland general election. For the first time, he stood as an official Ulster Unionist Party candidate, but he was not able to regain the seat.

Parliament of Northern Ireland
Preceded by Éamon de Valera	Member of Parliament for South Down; 1938–1945	Succeeded by Peter Murnoy
