= Joseph Burns (Northern Ireland politician) =

Politician from Northern Ireland

Joseph Burns (born 19 July 1906, date of death unknown) was an Ulster Unionist member of the Parliament of Northern Ireland. He represented North Londonderry from 1960 to 1973.

Born in Belfast and educated at Rainey Endowed School, Magherafelt, County Londonderry and New York University, he was an auctioneer and valuer, a farmer in Canada and a stockbroker. In 1920, he joined the Ulster Special Constabulary.

He served as Assistant Parliamentary Secretary at the Ministry of Finance and Assistant Whip from 1968 until 1969, when he resigned his post. He was chairman of the '66 Committee of Unionist backbenchers from 1970. He served as Parliamentary Secretary to the Ministry of Health and Social Services from 1971 until the prorogation of the Parliament in 1972. He was Chairman of the United Unionist Action Council in 1977. As a member of the then NI Government, he is held to have been a key figure in discussions to bring the University of Ulster to Coleraine in the early 1970s.

== Sources ==
- Biographies of Members of the Northern Ireland House of Commons

Parliament of Northern Ireland
Preceded by Robert Moore	Member of Parliament for North Londonderry; 1960–1973	Parliament abolished
Party political offices
Preceded by Samuel Magowan	Unionist Assistant Whip; 1968–1969; With: Samuel Magowan	Succeeded by Samuel Magowan; John William Kennedy
Political offices
Preceded by Samuel Magowan	Assistant Parliamentary Secretary to the Ministry of Finance; 1968–1969; With: Samuel Magowan	Succeeded by Samuel Magowan; John William Kennedy
Vacant	Parliamentary Secretary to the Ministry of Health and Social Services; 1971-1972	Office abolished
