= Robin Vane-Tempest-Stewart, 8th Marquess of Londonderry =

British peer and politician

The Most Honourable The Marquess of Londonderry DL
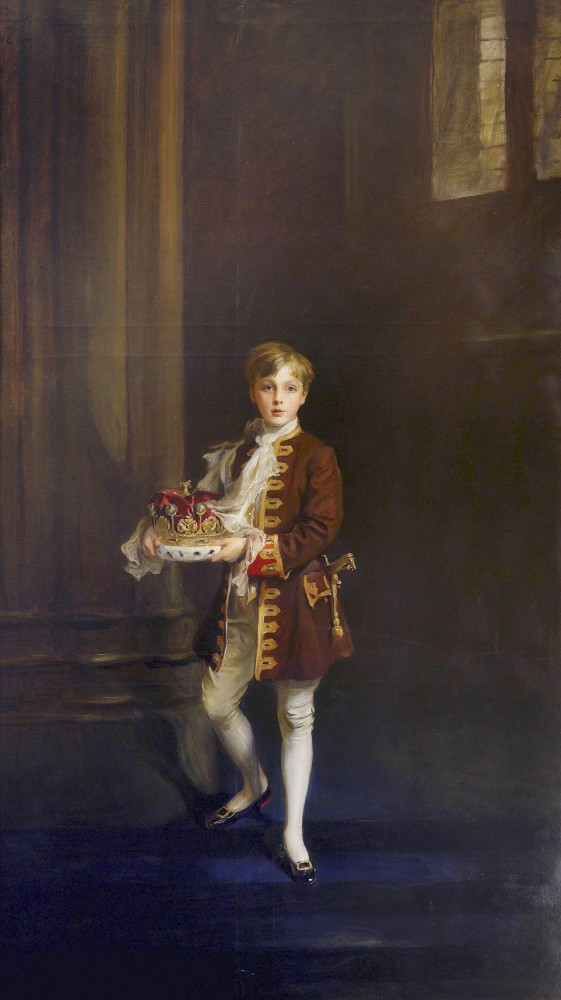
- Vane-Tempest-Stewart wearing a page's uniform for the coronation of King George V in 1911 and holding his grandfather's coronet

Member of the House of Lords Lord Temporal
- In office 10 February 1949 – 17 October 1955; Hereditary Peerage
- Preceded by: The 7th Marquess of Londonderry
- Succeeded by: The 9th Marquess of Londonderry

Member of Parliament for Down
- In office 27 October 1931 – 15 June 1945
- Preceded by: Sir David Reid; John Simms
- Succeeded by: James Little; Sir Walter Smiles

Personal details
- Born: Edward Charles Stewart Robert Vane-Tempest-Stewart; 18 November 1902 Mount Stewart, County Down, Northern Ireland or London, England
- Died: 17 October 1955 (aged 52) Stepney, Tower Hamlets, Middlesex, England
- Party: Ulster Unionist
- Spouse: Romaine Combe (m. 1931; died 1951)
- Children: Lady Jane Lacey; Lady Annabel Goldsmith; Alistair Vane-Tempest-Stewart, 9th Marquess of Londonderry
- Parent(s): Charles Vane-Tempest-Stewart, 7th Marquess of Londonderry; The Hon. Edith Chaplin
- Education: Eton College

Edward Charles Stewart Robert "Robin" Vane-Tempest-Stewart, 8th Marquess of Londonderry, DL (18 November 1902 – 17 October 1955), styled Lord Stewart until 1915 and Viscount Castlereagh between 1915 and 1949, was a British peer and politician.

== Early life ==
Born on 18 November 1902 into an Anglo-Irish noble family with roots in Ulster and County Durham, he was the second child and only son of the 7th Marquess of Londonderry and his wife, the Honourable Edith Helen Chaplin. King Edward VII stood sponsor at his christening in the Chapel Royal (St. James's Palace) on 16 December 1902, and the other sponsors were his grandfather Lord Londonderry, the Honourable Arthur Meade (later Earl of Clanwilliam), and the Duchess of Teck.

He was educated at Eton College. He served as a page at the coronation of King George V and Queen Mary in 1911. Philip de László painted a portrait of him holding his grandfather's coronet. This portrait now hangs at Mount Stewart in County Down.

He was known formally by his courtesy title, Viscount Castlereagh, before he inherited the marquessate, and as Robin by close friends and family throughout his life.

== Career ==
He worked as an honorary attaché at the British Embassy in Rome and as a director of Londonderry Collieries, the family's coal mining company. A keen football fan, he was first a director and then chairman of Arsenal Football Club from 1939 to 1946.

He was an accomplished public speaker and, before succeeding his father as Marquess of Londonderry in 1949, was the Unionist Member of Parliament for Down in the House of Commons of the United Kingdom from 1931 to 1945.

== Marriage and family ==
He was married on 31 October 1931 at St Martin-in-the-Fields to Romaine Combe (1 August 1904 – 19 December 1951), the daughter of Major Boyce Combe, of Farnham, Surrey. They had three children:

- Lady Jane Vane-Tempest-Stewart (born 11 August 1932)
- Lady Annabel Vane-Tempest-Stewart (13 June 1934 – 18 October 2025)
- Alistair Vane-Tempest-Stewart, 9th Marquess of Londonderry (7 September 1937 – 20 June 2012)

Lord Londonderry was a celebrated host and practical joker, reportedly once decorating the Christmas tree at Wynyard with condoms to startle a visiting cleric. He was an attentive husband and devoted father, entertaining his family with stories and tales. Also regarded as slightly eccentric, on one occasion Lord Londonderry had taken to his bed drunk, when Ruth Graham, the wife of the American evangelist Billy Graham, came to call. Although informed that his lordship was "indisposed", Mrs Graham insisted upon admission to his bedroom, having "come all the way on Billy's account". She was duly announced, after which Lord Londonderry threw aside the bedsheets and shouted, "Get in."

He had an awkward and distant relationship with his parents, especially his father. The two men took opposite sides during industrial disputes involving the family's coal mines, most notably during the General Strike in 1926. When he married Romaine Combe, a brewer's daughter, his family viewed the union with disdain. It was a happy marriage by all accounts, but after she died from cancer in 1951, her husband plunged into depression and alcoholism.

"Daddy changed, literally overnight, into a complete drunk," Lady Annabel Goldsmith, his daughter, recalled. "It was awful. He would collapse while making speeches to the cricket club, that kind of thing. He was on the bottle night and day."

Lord Londonderry died from liver failure on 17 October 1955, at age 52. He was buried alongside his wife at Wynyard Park and both were later re-interred in the Londonderry family vault at St Mary's Church, Longnewton, County Durham.

Parliament of the United Kingdom
Preceded by Sir David Reid; John Simms	Member of Parliament for Down; 1931–1945; With: Sir David Reid 1931–1939; James Little 1939–1945	Succeeded by James Little; Sir Walter Smiles
Peerage of Ireland
Preceded by Charles Vane-Tempest-Stewart	Marquess of Londonderry; 1949–1955	Succeeded by Alexander Vane-Tempest-Stewart
