= James Little (British politician) =

James Little (1868 – 1 April 1946) was a unionist politician in Northern Ireland.

Little studied at Queen's College and Assembly's College in Belfast before being ordained as a Presbyterian clergyman in 1900. He was elected for the Ulster Unionist Party (UUP) at the 1939 Down by-election, but was upset when he was put up for re-selection before the 1945 general election, and decided instead to stand as an independent Unionist. He easily topped the poll and was elected. He refused to rejoin the UUP, and died a few months later.

His son was David John Little, a judge and MP.

Parliament of the United Kingdom
Preceded by David Reid; Robin Vane-Tempest-Stewart	Member of Parliament for Down; 1939–1946; With: Robin Vane-Tempest-Stewart to 1945; W. D. Smiles from 1945	Succeeded by C. H. Mullan; W. D. Smiles
