= Ulster Unionist Chief Whip =

This is a list of people who served as Chief Whip of the Ulster Unionist Party in the Parliament of the United Kingdom, the Parliament of Northern Ireland and the Northern Ireland Assembly.

== Parliament of the United Kingdom ==
- 1886: William Ellison-Macartney and Robert Uniacke-Penrose-Fitzgerald
- James Kilfedder
- 1974: Robert Bradford
- 1975: Harold McCusker
- 1978: William Ross
- 1997: Martin Smyth
- 2001: Roy Beggs
- 2005: Post vacant
- 2015: None appointed
- 2024: Robin Swann (sole Ulster Unionist Member of Parliament (MP))

== Parliament of Northern Ireland ==
Until 1969, Chief Whips were given the title "Parliamentary Secretary to the Ministry of Finance".

- 1921: Herbert Dixon, 1st Baron Glentoran
- 1942: Sir Norman Stronge
- 1944: Sir Wilson Hungerford
- 1945: Lancelot Curran
- 1947: Walter Topping
- 1956: Brian Faulkner
- 1959: Isaac George Hawthorne
- 1963: William Craig
- 1963: James Chichester-Clark
- 1966: Post vacant
- 1968: Roy Bradford
- 1969: John Dobson
- 1971: John Brooke

=== Assistant Whips ===
Until 1969, Assistant Whips were given the title "Assistant Parliamentary Secretary to the Ministry of Finance".

- 1921: Thomas Henry Burn
- 1925: Henry Mulholland
- 1929: Sir Basil Brooke
- 1933: Sir Wilson Hungerford
- 1941: Sir Norman Stronge
- 1942: Robert Corkey
- 1943: vacant
- 1945: John Edgar Bailey
- 1958: Harry West
- 1958: William James Morgan
- 1961: William Fitzsimmons
- 1963: James Chichester-Clark
- 1963: vacant
- 1965: Isaac George Hawthorne
- 1966: Roy Bradford and Samuel Magowan
- 1967: Samuel Magowan and vacancy
- 1968: Samuel Magowan and Joseph Burns
- 1969: Samuel Magowan and John William Kennedy

== Northern Ireland Assembly ==
- 1973: Lloyd Hall-Thompson
- 1975: Austin Ardill
- 1982: William Douglas
- 1996: Robert Coulter
- 1998: Jim Wilson
- 2001: Ivan Davis
- 2004: David McClarty
- 2007: David McNarry
- 2008: Fred Cobain
- 2011: John McCallister
- 2012: Robin Swann
- 2017: Steve Aiken
- 2019: Robbie Butler
- 2021: John Stewart
- April 2024: Robbie Butler
- October 2024: Andy Allen
- 2025: Robbie Butler
- 2026: Diana Armstrong
