= South Down (Northern Ireland Parliament constituency) =

Coordinates: 54.145°N 6.297°W

- Former County constituency for the Parliament of Northern Ireland

Former constituency
- Created: 1929
- Abolished: 1973
- Election method: First past the post

South Down was a constituency of the Parliament of Northern Ireland.

== Boundaries ==
South Down was a county constituency comprising part of southern County Down. It was created when the House of Commons (Method of Voting and Redistribution of Seats) Act (Northern Ireland) 1929 introduced first-past-the-post elections throughout Northern Ireland. South Armagh was created by the division of Down into eight new constituencies. The constituency survived unchanged, returning one Member of Parliament until the Parliament of Northern Ireland was temporarily suspended in 1972, and then formally abolished in 1973.

The seat was centred on the towns of Newry and Warrenpoint, and also included certain district electoral divisions of the rural districts of Kilkeel and Newry No. 1.

== Politics ==
The seat had a substantial nationalist majority, with nationalist candidates winning every election, excepting 1938, when no nationalist stood. In 1933 it elected Irish Prime Minister Éamon de Valera, though he did not sit in the Stormont Parliament.

== Members of Parliament ==
Elected	Party	Name
1929	Nationalist	John Henry Collins
1933	Fianna Fáil	Éamon de Valera
1938	Ind. Unionist	James Brown
1938	UUP	James Brown
1945	Nationalist	Peter Murnoy
1949	Nationalist	Joe Connellan
1967	Nationalist	Max Keogh

== Election results ==
General Election 1929: South Down
Party	Candidate	Votes	%	±%
Nationalist	John Henry Collins	5,637	77.6	
Independent Labour	W. F. Cunningham	1,626	22.4	
Majority		4,011	55.2	
Turnout		7,263	46.4	
Nationalist win (new seat)				

General Election 1933: South Down
Party	Candidate	Votes	%	±%
Fianna Fáil	Éamon de Valera	7,404	92.3	New
Irish Republican	T. G. McGrath	622	7.7	New
Majority		6,782	84.6	+29.4
Turnout		8,026	49.7	+3.3
Fianna Fáil gain from Nationalist		Swing	N/A	

General Election 1938: South Down
Party	Candidate	Votes	%	±%
Ind. Unionist	James Brown	3,866	93.6	New
NI Labour	J. Byrne	263	6.4	New
Majority		3,603	87.2	N/A
Turnout		4,129	24.6	−25.1
Ind. Unionist gain from Fianna Fáil		Swing	N/A	

General Election 1945: South Down
Party	Candidate	Votes	%	±%
Nationalist	Peter Murnoy	9,006	68.1	New
UUP	C. H. Mullan	4,222	31.9	New
Majority		4,784	36.2	−51.0
Turnout		13,228	80.8	+56.2
Nationalist gain from Ind. Unionist		Swing	N/A	

General Election 1949: South Down
Party	Candidate	Votes	%	±%
Nationalist	Joe Connellan	9,478	70.2	+2.1
UUP	Robert Harcourt	4,032	29.8	−2.1
Majority		5,446	40.4	+4.2
Turnout		13,510	78.2	−2.6
Nationalist hold		Swing		

General Election 1953: South Down
Party	Candidate	Votes	%	±%
Nationalist	Joe Connellan	6,449	47.7	−22.5
UUP	J. Y. Thompson	4,065	30.0	+0.2
Irish Labour	T. J. Kelly	3,016	22.3	New
Majority		2,384	17.7	−22.7
Turnout		13,530	74.4	−3.8
Nationalist hold		Swing		

General Election 1958: South Down
Party	Candidate	Votes	%	±%
Nationalist	Joe Connellan	6,686	51.5	+3.8
UUP	James Brown	3,978	30.7	+0.7
Irish Labour	T. J. Kelly	2,316	17.8	−4.5
Majority		2,708	20.8	+3.1
Turnout		12,980	75.2	+0.8
Nationalist hold		Swing		

At the 1962 Northern Ireland general election, Joe Connellan was elected unopposed.

General Election 1965: South Down
Party	Candidate	Votes	%	±%
Nationalist	Joe Connellan	6,907	68.2	N/A
UUP	I. C. W. Hutchieson	3,227	31.8	New
Majority		3,680	36.4	N/A
Turnout		10,134	58.0	N/A
Nationalist hold		Swing	N/A	

South Down by-election, 1967
Party	Candidate	Votes	%	±%
Nationalist	Max Keogh	8,598	74.3	+6.1
UUP	J. Fisher	2,971	25.7	−6.1
Majority		5,627	48.6	−12.2
Turnout		11,569	67.0	+9.0
Nationalist hold		Swing		

General Election 1969: South Down
Party	Candidate	Votes	%	±%
Nationalist	Max Keogh	4,830	51.2	−17.0
People's Democracy	Fergus Woods	4,610	48.8	New
Majority		220	2.4	−34.0
Turnout		9,440	54.0	−4.0
Nationalist hold		Swing		
