= Thomas McMullan =

Sir Thomas Wallace McMullan (1864–1945) was a Northern Ireland businessman and politician.

== Life ==
Born 3 October 1864, he was the son of Thomas McMullan of Belfast and his wife Susan, daughter of David McMullan. He was educated at Methodist College Belfast and Queen's College. He went into business, becoming managing director and chairman of a wholesale grocers, Thomas McMullan Co. Ltd. of Belfast.

In 1921 McMullan, who was president of the Ulster Liberal Unionist Association, was elected as Ulster Unionist Party candidate to the Down constituency, retiring from politics and giving up his seat in 1929. He was knighted on 10 July of that year.

McMullan died on 20 January 1945.

== Family ==
McMullan married in 1892 Florence Henrietta Maclean, daughter of S. R. MacLean of Rye, New York.
