= 1933 Northern Ireland general election =

- 30 November 1933

All 52 seats to the House of Commons of Northern Ireland 27 seats were needed for a majority

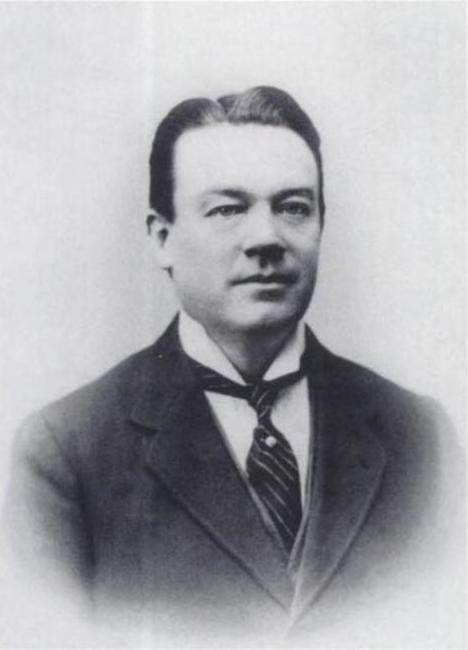
	First party	Second party	Third party
			NIL
Leader	Viscount Craigavon	Joe Devlin	Jack Beattie
Party	UUP	Nationalist	NI Labour
Leader since	7 June 1921	1918	1929
Leader's seat	North Down	Belfast Central	Belfast Pottinger
Last election	37 seats, 50.8%	11 seats, 11.7%	1 seat, 8.0%
Seats won	36 (Note: Includes 27 members elected unopposed.)	9 (Note: Includes 6 members elected unopposed.)	2
Seat change	▼1	▼2	▲1
Popular vote	73,791 (Note: Voting only took place in 19 of 52 seats. The other 33 MPs were unopposed.)	22,269	14,436
Percentage	43.5%	13.2%	8.5%
Swing	▼5.3%	▲1.4%	▲0.5%
- Election results by constituency
Prime Minister before election
James Craig
UUP
Prime Minister after election
James Craig
UUP

The 1933 Northern Ireland general election was held on 30 November 1933. Like all previous elections to the Parliament of Northern Ireland, it produced a large majority for the Ulster Unionist Party.

33 of the 52 MPs (63%) were elected unopposed, the largest number in the history of the House of Commons. The vast majority of those elected without a contest were Ulster Unionists.

== Results ==
↓
36	9	3	2	3
UUP	Nationalist	IU	L	Oth

1933 Northern Ireland general election
Party	Candidates						Votes		
Party	Stood	Elected	Gained	Unseated	Net	% of total	%	No.	Net %
UUP	41	36	0	1	-1	69.2	43.5	73,791	-5.3
Ind. Unionist	8	3	0	0	0	5.8	21.3	36,142	+7.0
Nationalist	10	9	0	2	-2	17.3	13.1	22,269	+1.4
NI Labour	3	2	1	0	+1	3.8	8.5	14,436	+0.5
Ind. Republican	4	1	1	0	+1	1.9	7.7	13,106	N/A
Fianna Fáil	1	1	1	0	+1	1.9	4.4	7,404	N/A
National League	1	0	0	0	0		1.3	2,211	N/A
Independent	1	0	0	0	0		0.2	331	-1.0

Electorate 793,952 (250,519 in contested seats); Turnout 67.7% (169,690). The sole member elected for Fianna Fáil was the President of the Executive Council (Prime Minister) of the Irish Free State, Éamon de Valera.

=== Seat changes ===
Constituency	From	To
Belfast Dock	UUP	NI Labour
South Armagh	Nationalist	Ind. Nationalist
South Down	Nationalist	Fianna Fáil

=== Votes summary ===
Popular vote
Ulster Unionist	43.5%
Independent Unionist	21.3%
Nationalist Party	13.1%
Labour	8.5%
Independent Republican	7.7%
Fianna Fáil	4.4%
National League	1.3%
Independent	0.2%

=== Seats summary ===
Parliamentary seats
Ulster Unionist	69.23%
Nationalist Party	17.31%
Independent Unionist	5.77%
Labour	3.85%
Independent Republican	1.92%
Fianna Fáil	1.92%

=== Contested seats ===
Only 19 of the 52 seats (37%) were actually contested.

1933 Northern Ireland general election (contested seats)
Party	Popular vote		Candidates		
Party	Votes	%	Stood	Elected	%
Ulster Unionist	73,791	43.5	14	9	47.4
Ind. Unionist	36,142	21.3	8	3	15.8
Nationalist	22,269	13.1	4	3	15.8
Labour	14,436	8.5	3	2	10.5
Ind. Republican	13,106	7.7	4	1	5.3
Fianna Fáil	7,404	4.4	1	1	5.3
Ind. Nationalist	2,211	1.3	1	0	—
Independent	331	0.2	1	0	—
Total	169,690	67.7	36	19	—

=== Uncontested seats ===
In 33 of the 52 seats (63%), only one candidate stood and they were elected unopposed without any votes cast. The vast majority of the MPs elected without a contest were Ulster Unionists.

1933 Northern Ireland general election (uncontested seats)
Party	Popular vote		Candidates		
Party	Votes	%	Stood	Elected	%
Ulster Unionist	Unopposed		27	27	81.8
Nationalist	Unopposed		6	6	18.2
Total			33	33	100
