= Cynthia Brooke, Viscountess Brookeborough =

Cynthia Mary Brooke, Viscountess Brookeborough, DBE (née Sergison; 10 May 1897 – 2 March 1970), was a British peeress and the first wife of the 1st Viscount Brookeborough, Prime Minister of Northern Ireland from 1943 to 1963.

Cynthia was born in Cuckfield, Sussex, to Captain Charles Warden Sergison and Florence Emma Louise Hanbury-Tracy, daughter of the 4th Baron Sudeley. In 1919, she married the then Sir Basil Brooke, 5th Baronet (9 June 1888 – 18 August 1973), son of Sir Arthur Douglas Brooke, 4th Bt., and Gertrude Isabella Batson, on 3 June 1919. Sir Basil was created the 1st Viscount Brookeborough in 1952. The future Lord and Lady Brookeborough had three sons, two of whom were killed in action during the Second World War. Only one son of the three survived his parents. They were:

- Lieutenant Basil Julian David Brooke (18 April 1920 – March 1943 (Killed in action)
- John Warden Brooke, 2nd Viscount Brookeborough (9 November 1922 – 5 March 1987)
- Lieutenant Henry Alan Brooke (29 October 1923 - April 1945) (Killed in action)

During the Second World War, she was Senior Commandant of the Auxiliary Territorial Service. Lady Brooke was styled as Viscountess Brookeborough from 1 July 1952, when her husband was created Viscount Brookeborough. In the 1959 Birthday Honours, she was invested as a Dame Commander of the Order of the British Empire (DBE), for public services in Northern Ireland.

== Death ==
Lady Brookeborough died on 2 March 1970, aged 72. After her death, Lord Brookeborough married Sarah Eileen Bell, daughter of Henry Healey, of Belfast, and widow of Cecil Armstrong Calvert, former director of neurosurgery at the Royal Victoria Hospital, Belfast.
