= Downshire =

Downshire may refer to the following:

Antarctica

- Downshire Cliffs

Northern Ireland

- County Down
- Downshire Hospital, psychiatric hospital at Downpatrick, County Down
- Downshire School, Carrickfergus, County Antrim
- Downshire railway station, Carrickfergus, County Antrim
- Downshire Young Men F.C., Hillsborough, County Down
- Downshire, electoral area of Lisburn City Council
- Marquess of Downshire

England

- Downshire Hill, street in Hampstead, London
