= Hanvey =

Hanvey is a surname of Irish origin. Notable people with the surname include:

- Bobbie Hanvey (born 1945), Northern Irish photographer and radio broadcaster
- Jock Hanvey (1882–1935), American college football player and coach
- Keith Hanvey (born 1952), English professional footballer
- Neale Hanvey (born 1964), Scottish politician
- Robert Jackson Hanvey (1899–1989), England international rugby union player
