= Francis Brooke =

Francis or Frank Brooke may refer to:

- Francis T. Brooke (1763–1851), politician from Virginia
- Francis Brooke (cricketer, born 1884) (1884–1960), English cricketer
- Francis Brooke (cricketer, born 1810) (1810–1886), English cricketer and British Army officer
- Francis Key Brooke (1852–1918), missionary bishop of what is now the Episcopal Diocese of Oklahoma
- Frank Brooke (1851–1920), Anglo-Irish Director of Great Southern and Eastern Railways and a member of the Earl of Ypres' Advisory Council
- Francis Brooke (political advisor), Acting Under Secretary for International Affairs of the US Department of the Treasury in 2026

== See also ==
- Frances Brooke (1724–1789), English novelist, essayist, playwright and translator
- Francis Gerard Brooks (1924–2010), Irish bishop
