= Fergal O'Hanlon =

Irish republican soldier

- Born: 2 February 1936; Ballybay, County Monaghan, Irish Free State
- Died: 1 January 1957 (age 20); Brookeborough, County Fermanagh, Northern Ireland
- Relatives: Eighneachán Ó hAnnluain (Brother)
- Military career
- Allegiance: Irish Republican Army
- Service years: 1956 - 1957
- Rank: Volunteer
- Conflicts: Border Campaign

Fergal O'Hanlon (Irish: Feargal Ó hAnnluain (2 February 1936 – 1 January 1957) was a volunteer in the Pearse Column of the Irish Republican Army (IRA).

== Background ==
Born in Ballybay, County Monaghan, Ireland, into a staunchly republican family, Feargal O'Hanlon was a draughtsman employed by Monaghan County Council. He was a Gaelic footballer and a keen Irish language activist. A devout Catholic, O'Hanlon considered becoming a priest and spent one year at the seminary in St. Macartan's College in Monaghan Town. In his diary in he stated his feelings on the use of force: "I know of no way by which freedom can be obtained, maintained except by armed men." He joined the IRA in 1956.

== Brookeborough raid ==
Aged 20, O'Hanlon was killed along with Seán South while taking part in an attack on the Royal Ulster Constabulary barracks in Brookeborough, County Fermanagh, during the Border Campaign. Several other IRA members were wounded in the botched attack. The IRA fled the scene in a dumper truck. They abandoned it near the border. They left South and O'Hanlon, both then unconscious, in a cow byre at Moane's Cross in the townland of Altawark, up in the hills between Brookeborough and Roslea in the south-east of County Fermanagh, and crossed into County Monaghan in the Republic of Ireland on foot for help for their comrades. The wounded IRA men were treated as "car crash victims" by sympathetic staff in the Mater Misericordiae Hospital in Dublin.

The events and personalities are sympathetically recalled in Dominic Behan's ballad "The Patriot Game". O'Hanlon is mentioned in the song Sean South of Garryowen ("Brave Hanlon by his side").

== Reaction ==
O'Hanlon's mother remained firmly committed to the IRA and was hurt by the suggestion that there was an alternative to IRA activity or that her son was anything other than an Irish hero.

A marble monument now stands at the spot where South and O'Hanlon lost their lives. An annual lecture has been held in memory of O’Hanlon since 1982, and approximately 500 people attended a 50th commemoration of the men's deaths in January 2007 in Limerick.

In 1971, a monument was unveiled to O'Hanlon in his hometown - on a hill overlooking the Clones Road on which he had made his last journey home. A Gaelic football team was founded in Monaghan in 2003 and called the Fergal O'Hanlons.

His brother Eighneachán Ó hAnnluain was elected a Sinn Féin abstentionist TD in the 1957 general election to Dáil Éireann. His sister Pádraigín Uí Mhurchadha was a Sinn Féin Councillor on Monaghan Urban Council.

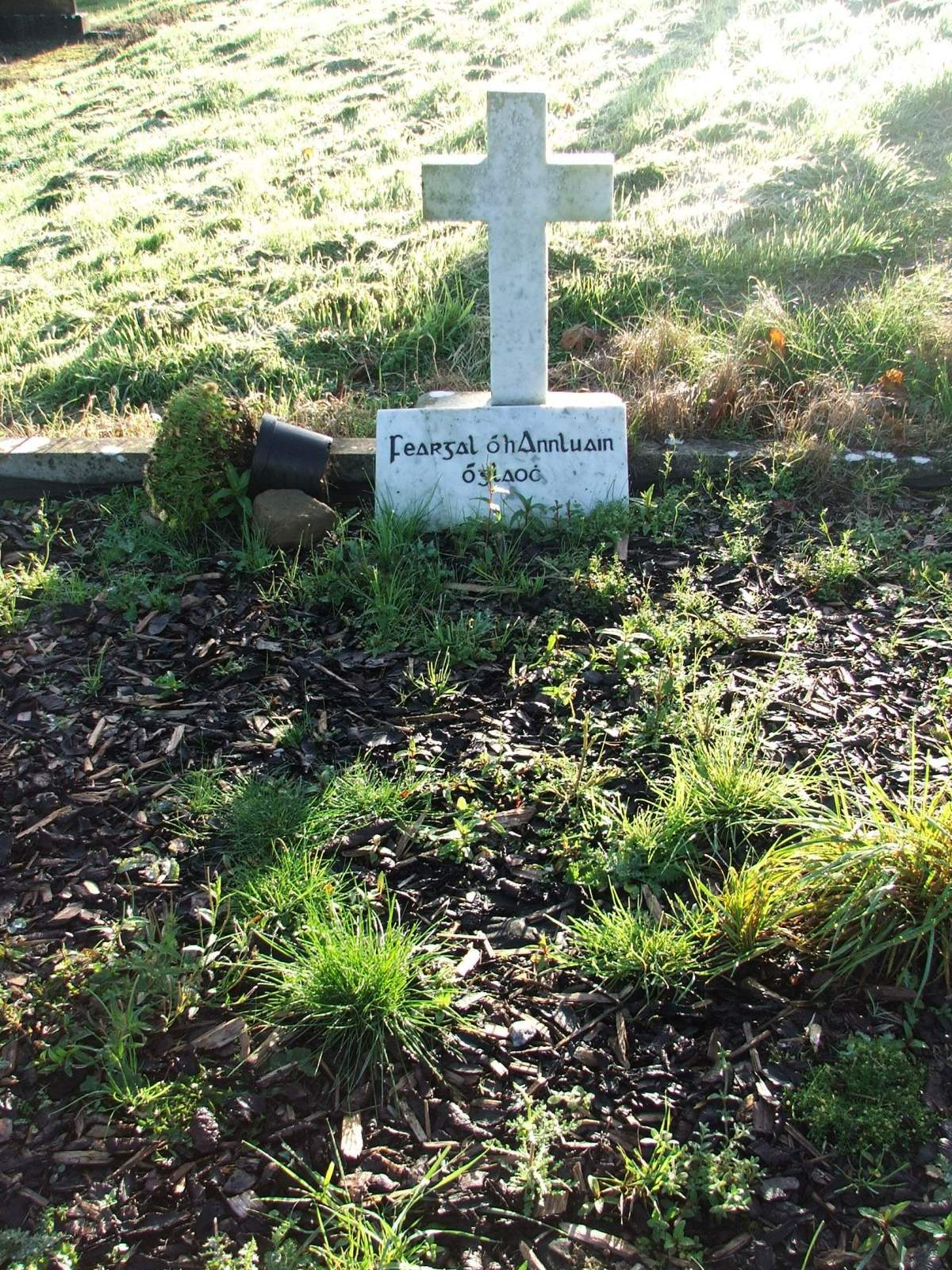
Fergal O'Hanlon's gravestone.

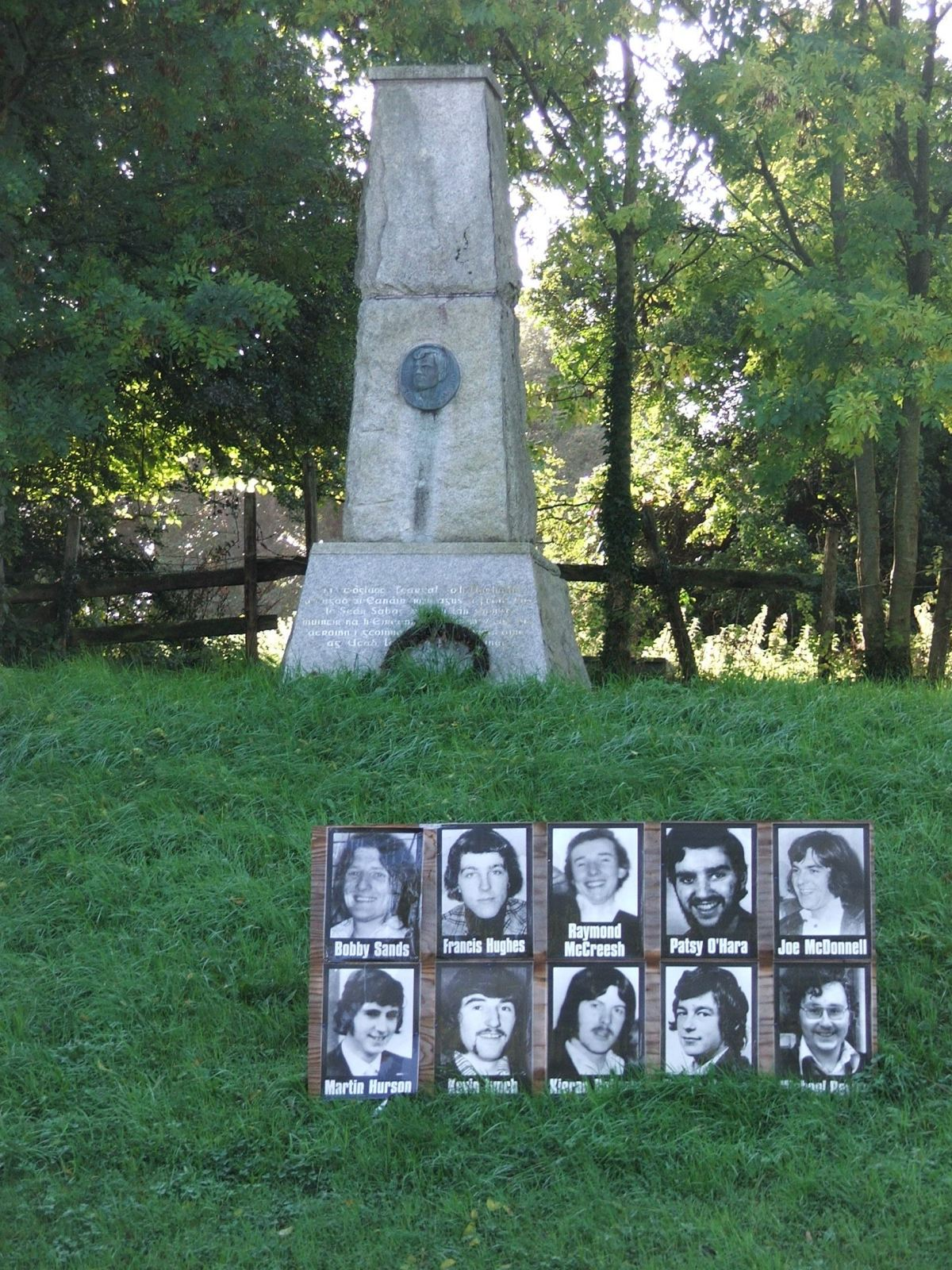
Monument erected in memory of Fergal O'Hanlon.

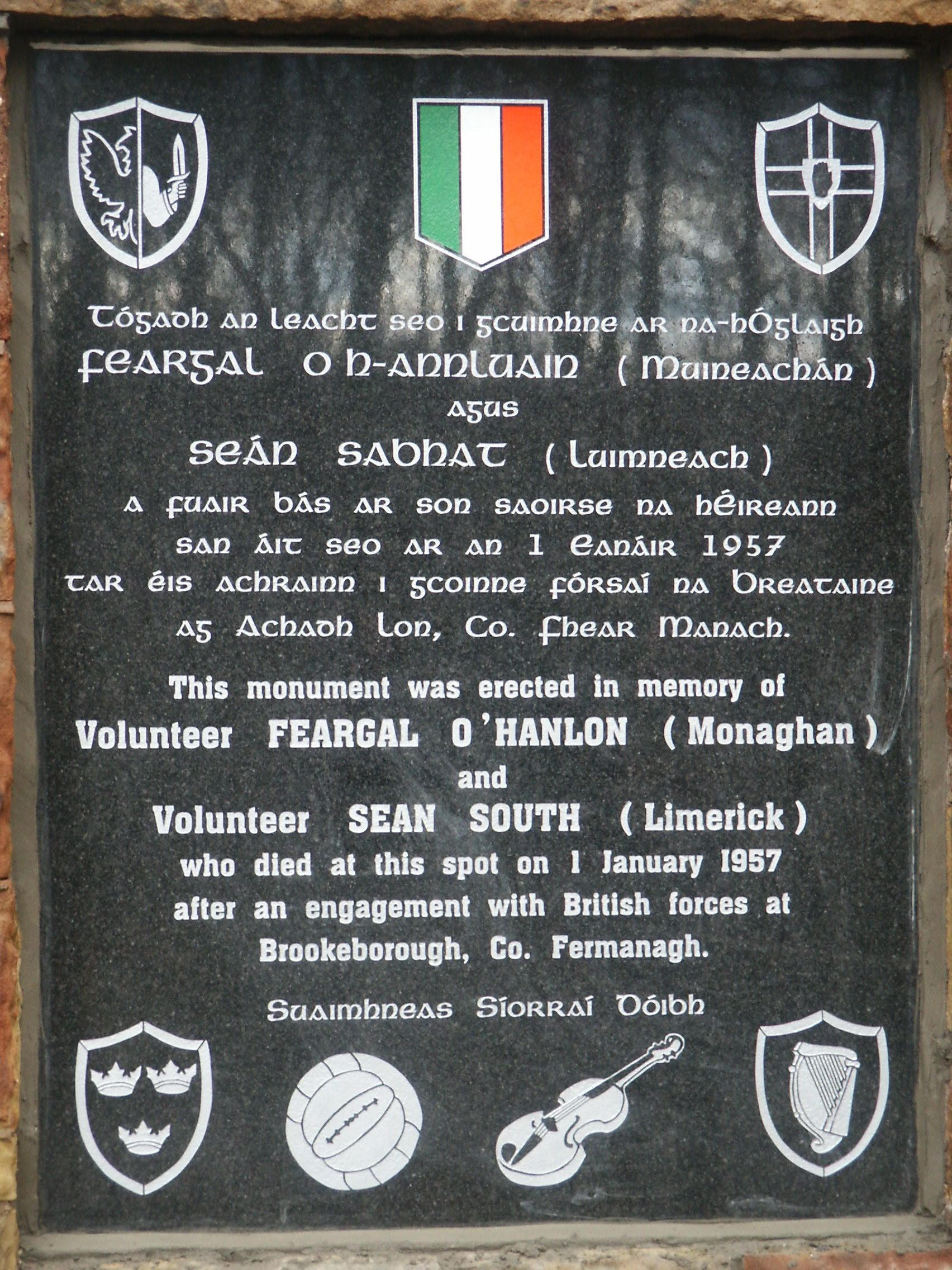
Monument in Moane's Cross, Fermanagh to South and O'Hanlon.

== Link ==
- The Patriot Game song lyrics chords and video about Fergal O'Hanlon
