= Lisnaskea (Northern Ireland Parliament constituency) =

Coordinates: 54.254°N 7.441°W

- Former County constituency for the Parliament of Northern Ireland
- Lisnaskea shown within Northern Ireland

Former constituency
- Created: 1929
- Abolished: 1973
- Election method: First past the post

Lisnaskea was a constituency of the Parliament of Northern Ireland. It was located in County Fermanagh and included the namesake town of Lisnaskea.

== Boundaries ==
Lisnaskea was a county constituency comprising the eastern part of County Fermanagh. It was created in 1929, when the House of Commons (Method of Voting and Redistribution of Seats) Act (Northern Ireland) 1929 introduced first-past-the-post elections throughout Northern Ireland. The constituency survived unchanged, returning one member of Parliament, until the Parliament of Northern Ireland was temporarily suspended in 1972, and then formally abolished in 1973.

== Politics ==
Lisnaskea had a unionist majority, but a substantial nationalist minority. The seat was consistently won by the Ulster Unionist Party candidate, and it was only contested on three occasions: in 1949 by a Nationalist candidate, in 1968 by Liberal and independent candidates and in 1969 by the People's Democracy and an independent Unionist candidate.

== Members of Parliament ==
| First elected | Party | Name |
|---|---|---|
| 1929 | UUP | Captain The 1st Viscount Brookeborough |
| 1968 | UUP | Captain John Brooke |

== Election results ==
At the 1929, 1933, 1938 and 1945 general elections, Captain Sir Basil Brooke, 5th Bt., was elected unopposed. From May 1943 to March 1963, Sir Basil (created Viscount Brookeborough in 1952) also served as the 3rd Prime Minister of Northern Ireland.

General Election 10 February 1949: Lisnaskea
| Party | Candidate | Votes | % | ±% |
|---|---|---|---|---|
| UUP | Sir Basil Brooke | 5,593 | 57.3 | N/A |
| Nationalist | John Carron | 4,173 | 42.7 | New |
| Majority | | 1,420 | 14.6 | N/A |
| Turnout | | 9,766 | 87.1 | N/A |
| UUP hold | | Swing | N/A | |

At the 1953, 1958, 1962 and 1965 general elections, Lord Brookeborough (formerly Sir Basil Brooke) was elected unopposed.

1968 Lisnaskea by-election
| Party | Candidate | Votes | % | ±% |
|---|---|---|---|---|
| UUP | Captain John Brooke | 4,428 | 50.3 | N/A |
| Independent | F. G. Patterson | 3,270 | 37.2 | New |
| Ulster Liberal | Stanley Wynne | 1,104 | 12.5 | New |
| Majority | | 1,158 | 13.1 | N/A |
| Turnout | | 8,802 | 83.0 | N/A |
| UUP hold | | Swing | N/A | |

General Election 24 February 1969: Lisnaskea
| Party | Candidate | Votes | % | ±% |
|---|---|---|---|---|
| UUP | Captain John Brooke | 4,794 | 52.0 | +1.7 |
| Ind. Unionist | J. D. A. Henderson | 2,702 | 29.3 | New |
| People's Democracy | M. Carey | 1,726 | 18.7 | New |
| Majority | | 2,092 | 22.7 | +9.6 |
| Turnout | | 9,222 | 87.8 | +4.8 |
| UUP hold | | Swing | N/A | |

- Parliament prorogued 30 March 1972 and abolished 18 July 1973
