= Alan Brooke, 3rd Viscount Brookeborough =

British peer (born 1952)

Lieutenant Colonel The Right Honourable The Viscount Brookeborough Bt KG KStJ
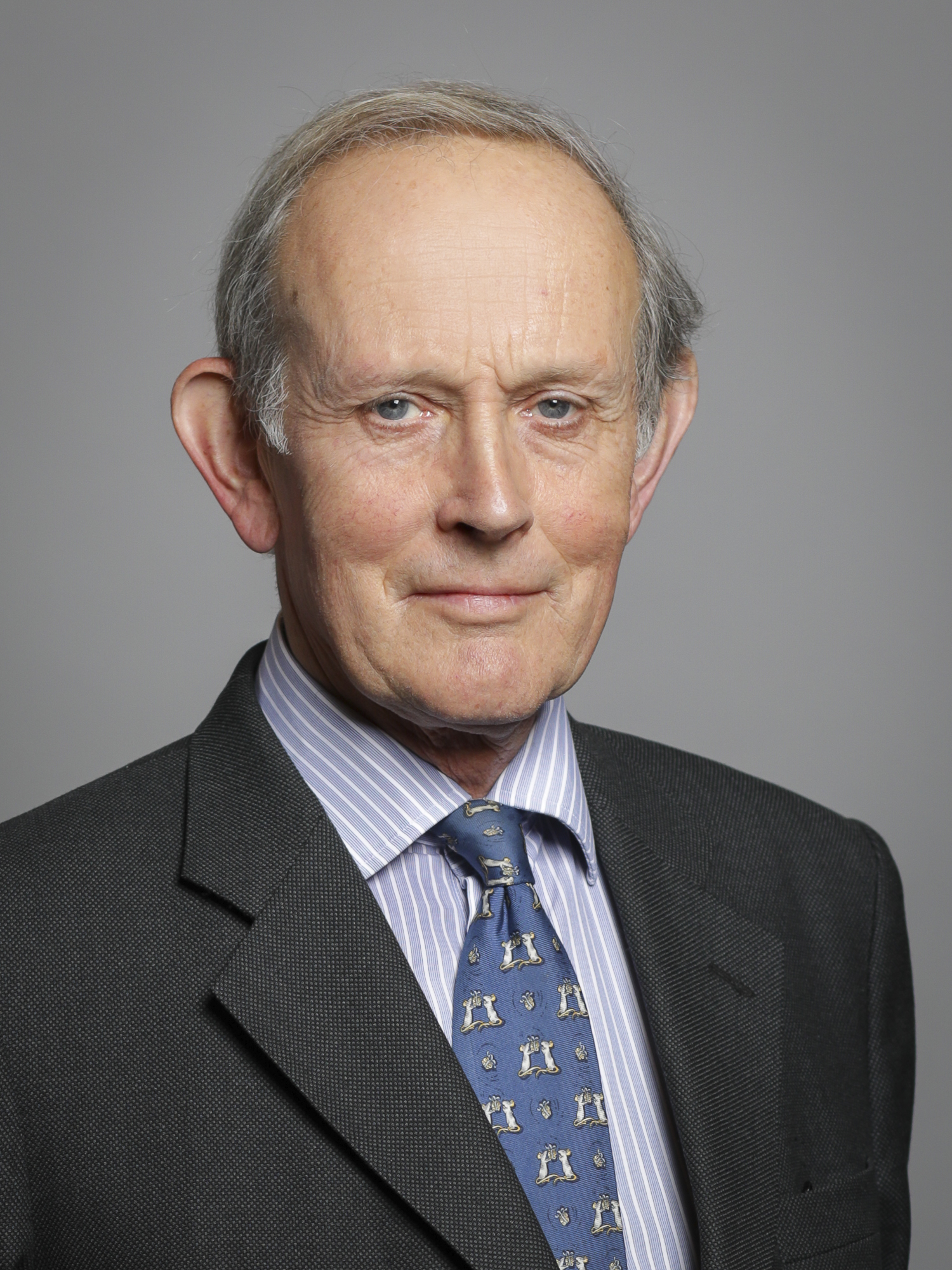
- Official portrait of Lord Brookeborough, 2019

Lord Lieutenant of Fermanagh
- Incumbent
- Assumed office 2 July 2012
- Monarchs: Elizabeth II; Charles III
- Preceded by: The Earl Erne

Deputy Lieutenant of Fermanagh
- In office 10 September 1987 – 2 July 2012
- Monarch: Elizabeth II

High Sheriff of Fermanagh
- In office 1995–1996
- Monarch: Elizabeth II
- Preceded by: W. R. M. Farrell
- Succeeded by: Peter Moffitt Crawford

HM's Personal Lord-in-waiting
- Incumbent
- Assumed office 1997
- Monarchs: Elizabeth II; Charles III

Member of the House of Lords
- Lord Temporal
- Hereditary peerage 10 September 1987 – 11 November 1999
- Preceded by: The 2nd Viscount Brookeborough
- Succeeded by: Seat abolished
- Elected Hereditary Peer; 11 November 1999 – 29 April 2026
- Election: 1999
- Preceded by: Seat established
- Succeeded by: Seat abolished

Personal details
- Born: 30 June 1952 (age 74)
- Party: Crossbench
- Education: Royal Agricultural University

Alan Henry Brooke, 3rd Viscount Brookeborough (born 30 June 1952) is a Northern Irish peer and landowner. He was one of the 92 hereditary peers who remained in the House of Lords until the House of Lords (Hereditary Peers) Act 2026; he sat as a crossbencher. He is the current Lord Lieutenant of Fermanagh.

== Early life and career ==
Lord Brookeborough was educated at Harrow School, Millfield and at the Royal Agricultural College (now Royal Agricultural University), Cirencester.

He joined the British Army in 1971, being commissioned into the 17th/21st Lancers. In 1977 he transferred to the Ulster Defence Regiment (UDR), which was to become the Royal Irish Regiment (RIR) in 1992. He was promoted to lieutenant-colonel in 1993, and became honorary colonel of the 4th/5th Battalion, Royal Irish Rangers, in 1997.

== Marriage and family ==
Lord Brookeborough (known to his family and friends as Alan Brooke or Alan Brookeborough) married Janet Elizabeth Cooke (daughter of J. P. Cooke, of Doagh), now Viscountess Brookeborough, in 1980. They farm the 1,000 acres (4.0 km^{2}) Colebrooke Estate, just outside Brookeborough in County Fermanagh, Northern Ireland. The centre of the estate is Colebrooke Park, an early 19th-century Neoclassical country house that is the ancestral seat of the Brooke family.

Lord Brookeborough has no children. His younger brother, The Hon Christopher Brooke (who has four sons and a daughter), is heir presumptive to the viscountcy. Lord Brookeborough intends to leave the Colebrooke Estate, including Colebrooke Park, to his nephew, his brother's eldest son and heir. He is third cousin to Queen Camilla, both descending from the 1st Baron Ashcombe.

Field Marshal The 1st Viscount Alanbrooke (1883–1963) was also a member of the same family. Lord Alanbrooke was an uncle of the 1st Viscount Brookeborough.

== Honours ==
Brooke succeeded his father as Viscount Brookeborough in 1987. Although he lost his automatic right to a seat in the House of Lords, with all other hereditary peers after the passage of the House of Lords Act 1999, Lord Brookeborough remained in the House as an elected crossbench hereditary peer.

He was a lord-in-waiting to Queen Elizabeth II from 1997 until her death in 2022, and has continued in the role under King Charles III. He is President of the Co Fermanagh Ulster Unionist Association and was appointed an independent member of the Northern Ireland Policing Board in 2001. Lord Brookeborough represented the Queen as Lord-in-Waiting at the arrival of U.S. President Barack Obama and First Lady Michelle Obama in the United Kingdom on their state visit on 24 May 2011.

Knight Companion of the Order of the Garter (KG)	23 April 2018
Baronet (Bt)	7th Baronet Brooke of Colebrooke
Knight of the Order of St John (KStJ)	26 June 2014
General Service Medal	with clasp Northern Ireland
Queen Elizabeth II Diamond Jubilee Medal	6 February 2012
Queen Elizabeth II Platinum Jubilee Medal	6 February 2022
King Charles III Coronation Medal	6 May 2023
Accumulated Campaign Service Medal	
Sash of the Order of the Aztec Eagle	(Mexico, 9 September 2015)
Commander of the Order of Isabella the Catholic	(Spain, 12 July 2017)

== Arms ==
Coat of arms of Alan Brooke, 3rd Viscount Brookeborough
Coronet Coronet of a Viscount Crest A Brock or Badger passant Argent. Escutcheon Or, a Cross engrailed per pale Gules and Sable differenced by a Crescent Sable, a canton of a baronet. Supporters Dexter: a Dolphin Sable. Sinister: a Lion double-queued Gules, langued Azure. Motto GLORIA FINES (Glory to the end) Orders Order of the Garter circlet (Appointed 23 April 2018) HONI SOIT QUI MAL Y PENSE (Shame on him who thinks evil of it); Venerable Order of Saint John (Appointed KStJ 26 June 2014) Banner The banner of the Viscount's arms used as knight of the Garter depicted at St George's Chapel.

== See also ==
- List of Northern Ireland members of the House of Lords

Peerage of the United Kingdom
Preceded by John Brooke	Viscount Brookeborough; 1987–present Member of the House of Lords (1987–1999)	Incumbent
Parliament of the United Kingdom
New office created by the House of Lords Act 1999	Elected hereditary peer to the House of Lords under the House of Lords Act 1999; 1999–2026	Office abolished under the House of Lords (Hereditary Peers) Act 2026
Honorary titles
Preceded by The Earl Erne	Lord Lieutenant of Fermanagh; 2012–present	Incumbent
