= The Patriot Game =

Irish ballad by Dominic Behan

"The Patriot Game" is an Irish ballad with lyrics by Dominic Behan and a melody from the traditional tune "One Morning in May", first released in 1958.

== History ==
The song concerns an incident during the Border Campaign launched by the Irish Republican Army during the 1950s. It was written by Dominic Behan, younger brother of playwright Brendan Behan, to the tune of an earlier folksong, "One Morning in May" (recorded by Jo Stafford and Burl Ives as "The Nightingale"). It tells the story of Fergal O'Hanlon, an IRA Volunteer from Monaghan Town, County Monaghan who was killed at the age of 20 in an attack on Brookeborough Royal Ulster Constabulary barracks in County Fermanagh on 1 January 1957. The operation was devised and led by Seán Garland, an IRA man from Dublin. Another volunteer, Seán South from Limerick, was also killed during the raid.

Behan later became close friends with Seán Garland, officiating as the best man at Garland's wedding. Behan had been involved with the IRA before writing the song but he did not support the continuing campaign of the IRA at the time, and altered the first verse from his initial lyrics to distance himself from nationalism.

The song is one of the best known to emerge from the Irish nationalist struggle and has been popular amongst Nationalists. It has been covered by artists from different traditions such as Harvey Andrews and Christy Moore, who said that British soldiers often requested the song at his gigs. "The Patriot Game" has been recorded by numerous artists, including The Kingston Trio, The Bluebells, The Dubliners, The Wolfe Tones, Schooner Fare, and The Clancy Brothers. It also appears on the Judy Collins LP record Whales and Nightingales. In December 1965 it was performed on Granada Television’s “Opportunity Knocks” by the folk group “The Exiles” to great acclaim by the audience.

== Versions ==
There are variations on the lyrics, some of which date from Behan's different versions. For example, the last line can be sung as either "... cowards who sold out the patriot game" or "... Quislings who sold out the patriot game".

The Clancy Brothers chose not to sing the verses which sanctioned the murders of Irish police officers or which criticised Éamon de Valera, a choice to which Behan took exception:

This Ireland of mine has for long been half free,
Six counties are under John Bull's tyranny.
And still de Valera is greatly to blame
For shirking his part in the patriot game.

I don't mind a bit if I shoot down police
They are lackeys for war never guardians of peace
And yet at deserters I'm never let aim
The rebels who sold out the patriot game

When Liam Clancy sang the song with the Clancy Brothers, he did include the John Bull verse, but rewrote the second half of it as "So I gave up my boyhood to drill and to train, to play my own part in the patriot game". A handful of other artists have since then used those new lyrics in their covers. Most musicians who sang the verse as written by Behan still adjusted the lyric about de Valera and sang it in a more general manner as "the leaders". The verse about police officers is very commonly omitted, even by nationalist bands such as the Irish Brigade and the Wolfe Tones, although Harvey Andrews and Declan Hunt included it unaltered.

"They are lackeys for war never guardians of peace" is a reference to the Garda Síochána, the Irish police force, whose name means 'guardians of peace'.

The version by the Bluebells altered many of the lyrics to criticise "the old men who pay for the patriot game", implying that young volunteers are manipulated into dying for a cause that they believe to be just. One verse is entirely new.

Where is the young man, this Earth ever taught
Whose life is less sacred than all the old frauds
Whose boyhood less lovely, whose vision less vain
Than the old men who paid for the patriot game

== Appropriation ==
Like Behan, Bob Dylan used the melody of "The Merry Month of May" for his own song "With God on Our Side". Behan criticised Dylan publicly by claiming the melody as an original composition. He was annoyed because the first two verses of Dylan's song were a parody of his own song. Behan took the view that the provenance of Dylan's entire body of work must be questioned. Mike Evans writes that "legend has it" that, during an early tour of the UK by Bob Dylan, Behan rang him at his hotel room with an uncompromising tirade. When Bob Dylan suggested that "My lawyers can speak with your lawyers", Behan replied, "I've got two lawyers, and they're on the end of my wrists."

== Popular culture ==
American filmmaker Arthur MacCaig named his 1979 documentary after the song, a portrayal of Irish history from a Republican perspective. The title was also used as the title of a 1986 book The Patriot Game by Canadian author Peter Brimelow. The book evokes the same cynicism about nationalism, but in a Canadian context. Tom Clancy's 1987 novel Patriot Games and the 1992 film based on the novel are named for the song. The song features heavily in Martin McDonagh's play The Lieutenant of Inishmore, where it is used to comment on the character's misunderstanding of IRA splinter groups. Damien Dempsey's song "Colony" also references the title.
