= Brooke baronets =

There have been six baronetcies created for persons with the surname Brooke, one in the Baronetage of England, one in the Baronetage of Ireland and four in the Baronetage of the United Kingdom. As of 2026 four of the creations are extant, with one of those subsumed into a peerage.

- Brooke baronets of Norton (1662)
- Brooke baronets, of Colebrooke (first creation, 1764): see Sir Arthur Brooke, 1st Baronet (died 1785)
- Brooke baronets, of Colebrooke (second creation, 1822): see Viscount Brookeborough
- Brooke baronets of Armitage Bridge (1899): see Sir Thomas Brooke, 1st Baronet (1830–1908)
- Brooke baronets of Summerton (1903)
- Brooke baronets of Almondbury (1919)

== See also ==
- de Capell-Brooke baronets
- Brooks baronets
