= Bobbie Hanvey =

Bobbie Hanvey (born 31 October 1945) is a Northern Irish photographer and radio broadcaster. He won the Northern Ireland Provincial Press Photographer of the Year Award for himself and the Down Recorder newspaper of Downpatrick, County Down, in 1985, 1986, and 1987. He also won the Northern Ireland overall award for "Best People Picture" in 1985 and 1987. These were the only three years that he entered the competitions. His work has also been exhibited at Down County Museum. His photographs have appeared in The Sunday Times and he writes a weekly column featuring his photographs for the Down Recorder.

== Personal life ==
Hanvey was born in Brookeborough, County Fermanagh. His autobiography, The Mental, describes everyday life in Fermanagh during the 1950s and charts his time as a psychiatric nurse in the Downshire Hospital in Downpatrick during the 1960s. He lives in Downpatrick and has three children: Steafán, Ciarán, and Sarah Ann.

== Radio ==
Hanvey has been hosting his popular programme, The Ramblin' Man, on Downtown Radio since the late 1970s. Guests on his programme have included Ulster Volunteer Force leader Gusty Spence, Provisional Irish Republican Army veteran Joe Cahill, the last four Chief Constables of the Royal Ulster Constabulary (RUC) and its successor organisation, the Police Service of Northern Ireland – Sir Jack Hermon, Sir Hugh Annesley, Sir Ronnie Flanagan, and Sir Hugh Orde. Other guests have included writers Eugene McCabe, Maurice Leitch, and J. P. Donleavy, as well as soldiers, sailors, and travelling people.

== Books ==
Hanvey is one of Ireland's foremost photographers. His first photographic book, Merely Players, presents portraits taken since the 1970s of poets, playwrights, paramilitaries, priests, and politicians. They include Brian Friel, Danny Morrison, David Hammond, Gerry Adams, Sammy Duddy, Seamus Heaney, and others. His most recent photographic book, The Last Days of the RUC, presents the only historic account of the transition of the Royal Ulster Constabulary to the Police Service of Northern Ireland. Hanvey's autobiography, "The Mental," provides insights into life in Fermanagh during the 1950s and his experiences as a psychiatric nurse at the Downshire Hospital in Downpatrick during the 1960s.
