= Seán South =

Irish republican soldier

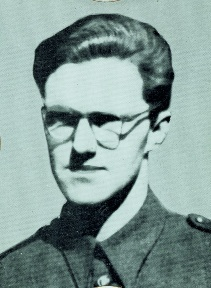
- Born: 8 February 1928; Limerick, County Limerick, Ireland
- Died: 1 January 1957 (aged 28); Brookeborough, County Fermanagh, Northern Ireland
- Burial place: Mount St Lawrence Cemetery, Limerick, County Limerick
- Military career
- Allegiance: Irish Republic
- Branch: Irish Republican Army
- Service years: 1956–1957
- Rank: Volunteer
- Unit: Pearse Column
- Conflicts: Border Campaign

Seán South (Irish: Seán Sabhat; 8 February 1928 – 1 January 1957) was a member of an IRA military column led by Seán Garland on a raid against a Royal Ulster Constabulary (RUC) barracks in Brookeborough, County Fermanagh, Northern Ireland, on New Year's Day 1957. South, along with Fergal O'Hanlon from County Monaghan, died of wounds sustained during the raid. South has subsequently been commemorated as a martyr by Republicans.

== Life ==
Seán South was born in Limerick, where he was educated at Sexton Street Christian Brothers School, later working as a clerk in a local wood-importing company called McMahon's. He was a member of a number of organisations, including Clann na Poblachta (who he worked for during the 1948 election), Sinn Féin, the Gaelic League and the Legion of Mary. In Limerick he founded the local branch of Maria Duce, a conservative and anti-Semitic Roman Catholic organisation led by Father Denis Fahey, where South also edited both An Gath and An Giolla. While not a member, South is also suggested by some, though disputed by others, to have been associated with the fascist Ailtirí na hAiséirghe political party, whose members he met through the Irish language organisations Craobh na hAiséirghe (a branch of the Gaelic League) and Glún na Buaidhe, which coexisted and cooperated with Ailtirí na hAiséirghe. Although South's 1964 biographer Mainchin Seoighe believed he was a member, the historian R.M. Douglas stated there was "no evidence" South had connections to Ailtiri na hAiséirghe, adding that had he been a member it was "extremely unlikely" that the party would not have publicized this in the wake of his death

He had received military training as a lieutenant of the Irish army reserve, the Local Defence Force, which would later become An Fórsa Cosanta Áitiúil, before he became a volunteer in the Irish Republican Army.

Being a member of An Réalt (the Irish-speaking chapter of the Legion of Mary), South was a devout Catholic and a conservative, even by the standards of the day. It was at a meeting of An Réalt that he met his only serious girlfriend, Máire de Paor. She was a schoolteacher from Limerick and was a great lover of the Irish language. He was also a member of the Knights of Columbanus.

In 1949, South wrote a series of letters to his local newspaper, the Limerick Leader. These letters condemned Hollywood films for what South regarded as their immoral messages. South accused these films of promoting a "stream of insidious propaganda which proceeds from Judeo-Masonic controlled sources, and which warps and corrupts the minds of our youth." South also claimed that the American film industry was controlled by "Jewish and Masonic executives dictating to Communist rank and file." In his letters, South also denounced Irish trade unions, and praised the activities of Senator Joseph McCarthy in the United States. In other writings in later years, South quoted material from A. K. Chesterton, a member of the British Union of Fascists and the founder of the League of Empire Loyalists.

== Death ==
On New Year's Day 1957, 14 IRA volunteers crossed the border into County Fermanagh to launch an attack on a joint RUC/B Specials barracks at Moane's Cross in Altawark townland near Cooneen, six miles from Brookeborough. During the attack a number of volunteers were injured, two fatally. South and Fergal O'Hanlon died of their wounds as they were making their escape. Their bodies were brought into an old sandstone barn by their comrades. The stone from the barn was used to build a memorial at the site. The site is located at the intersection of Cooneen Road and Teiges Hill Road about six miles northwest of Roslea.

South's funeral was held on 5 January 1957 and drew massive crowds numbering in the thousands, including members of the Catholic clergy and Ted Russell, Mayor of Limerick.

== Legacy ==
South's legacy remains a controversial and contested issue, particularly in Northern Ireland where South died. In 2019, Ulster Unionist Party MLA Rosemary Barton denounced Martin Kenny of Sinn Féin for praising South's legacy at an annual memorial held for South in Limerick. Barton suggested South's 1957 raid on the Brookeborough barracks was a terrorist act and called South "a well-known fascist and an anti-Semite". Each year in Limerick Sinn Féin organise a commemoration of South with Limerick Sinn Féin councillor John Costelloe saying "for a man to come up from Limerick and take on the might of the British Empire took some guts...we should honour our heroes".

The Limerick City cumann of Official Sinn Féin was named after South.

In 2025, Irish republican and historian Pádraig Óg Ó Ruairc condemned South as a fascist and stated that South was not someone the Republican movement should commemorate.

=== Commemoration ===
The attack on the barracks inspired two popular rebel songs: "Seán South of Garryowen" and "The Patriot Game".

- "Sean South", also known as "Sean South of Garryowen", written by Sean Costello to the tune of another republican ballad "Roddy McCorley" and made famous by the Wolfe Tones.
- South is also mentioned in the Rubberbandits' song "Up Da Ra", which pokes fun at the concept of armchair republicanism using the literary device of the unreliable narrator.
- There is a plaque dedicated to him outside his birthplace on Henry Street, Limerick.

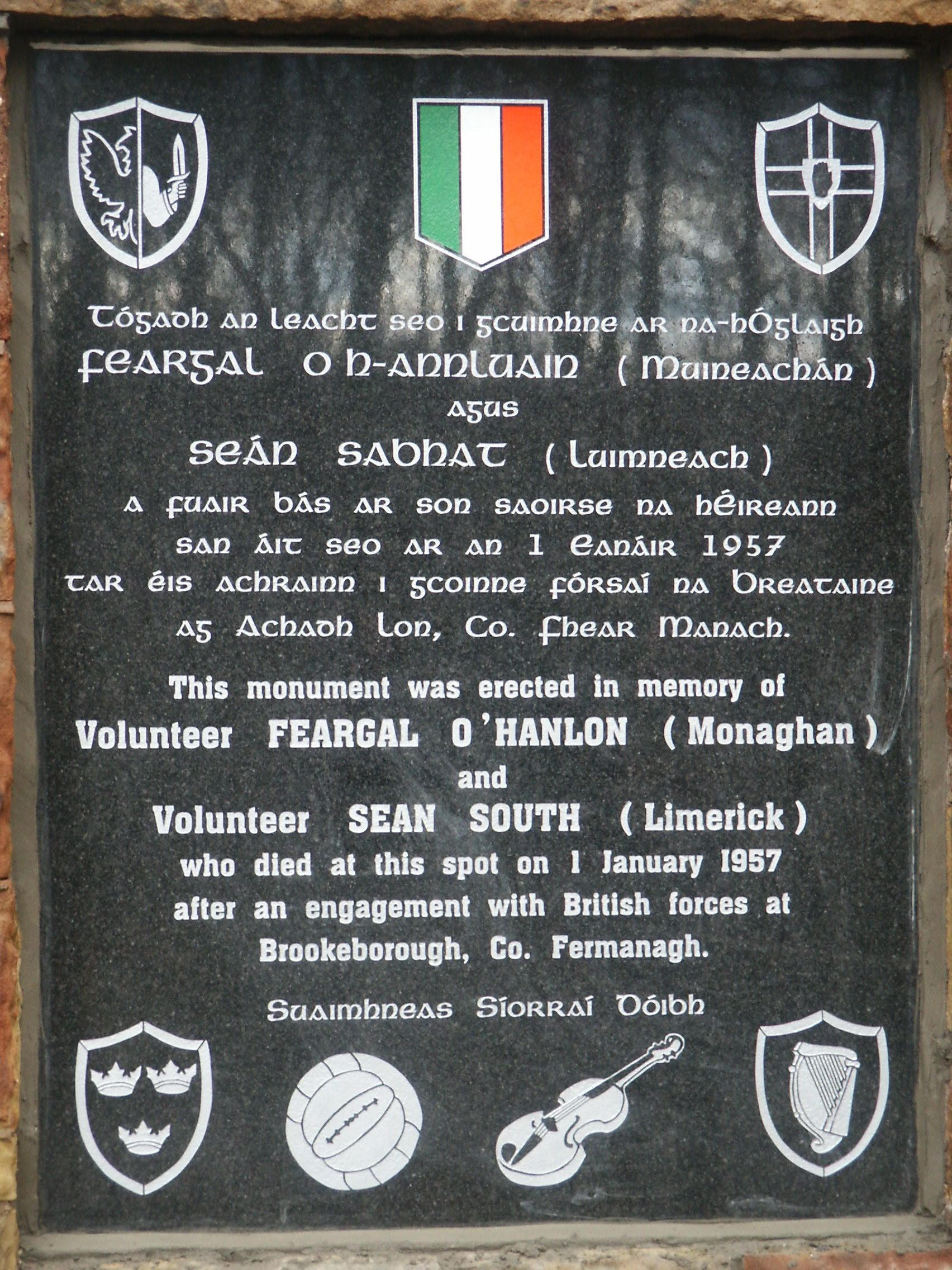
Monument in Moane's Cross, Fermanagh to South and O'Hanlon
