= Carrickfergus College =

Coordinates: 54.7275°N 5.8133°W

- Carrickfergus College logo/emblem

Location
- 110 North Road; Carrickfergus, County Antrim; Northern Ireland

Information
- Type: Secondary School
- Motto: "Discendo Sciamas"
- Established: 1959
- School board: NEELB
- Principal: H Webb
- Enrolment: Approx. 800
- Colours: Blue and White
- Website: carrickferguscollege.co.uk

Carrickfergus College was a secondary school in Carrickfergus, County Antrim, Northern Ireland. The college was opened in 1959 and has over 750 students and 52 teachers. It is within the North Eastern Education and Library Board.

== History ==
Carrickfergus College was previously known as Carrickfergus High School. It is locally (and colloquially) known simply as "Carrick College".

In May 2007 the school became one of 25 specialist secondary and grammar schools in Northern Ireland. Its specialty is Business and Enterprise. As a specialist school they received additional funding of about £400,000 for the next four years.

During the school year 2009/2010, Carrickfergus College celebrated its 50th anniversary. In 2010 the school began offering GCSE Ancient History.

In 2011, the College achieved its highest ever GCSE pass rate for pupils achieving 5+ GCSE grades A* - C of 72%, above the Northern Ireland average for similar schools of 67%. This was a considerable increase from the previous year's 42%. In 2012 GCSE grades were 66.4% achieving 5+ grades at A* - C grade or equivalent. In 2013 GCSE results increased to a pass rate of 68.4% for pupils gaining 5+ GCSEs at grades A* - C.

In 2013, a planned amalgamation of Carrickfergus College with Ulidia College and Downshire School was shelved.

In 2015, a pupil from the school had achieved the highest mark in GCSE Ancient History from the previous school year in Northern Ireland.

Carrickfergus College merged with Downshire School and they became Carrickfergus Academy.

Year	% gaining 5+ GCSEs grades A*-C
2007	42%
2008	42%
2009	46%
2010	42%
2011	72%
2012	66.4%
2013	68.4%

== Carrickfergus Learning Community (CLC) ==
Carrickfergus College is currently involved in a new curricular scheme called the Carrickfergus Learning Community (CLC), along with Carrickfergus Grammar School, Downshire, and Ulidia Integrated College. Students wishing to access these courses must have met the school criteria for returning to their own school to complete sixth form studies and meet the entry requirements for the individual subject they wish to study.

== House system ==
The school has set up a house system similar to Carrickfergus Grammar with houses Castle, Fergus, Knockagh and Thornfield.

== Podcast ==
In October 2012 after a visit from local CityBeat DJ Stephen Clements, Carrickfergus College launched a podcast feature on their school website. Updated monthly, the podcast highlights pupils of the school reporting on important events throughout the year. In December 2012 the podcasts were made available for download on iTunes.
