= List of Northern Ireland members of the House of Lords =

This is a list of Members of the United Kingdom House of Lords who were born, held office in, live or lived in Northern Ireland.

This list does not include hereditary peers whose only parliamentary service was in the House of Lords prior to the passage of the House of Lords Act 1999, and who lost their seats under that Act. Nor does it include those in the Peerage of Ireland, who have never had an automatic right to a seat in the House of Lords at Westminster. (Note: Irish Peers sat in the Irish House of Lords, with the passing of the Act of Union 1800 this House was abolished and twenty-eight Peers in the peerage of Ireland were elected to sit in the United Kingdom House of Lords between 1800 and 1922, when the right was exhausted due to the Government of Ireland Act 1920.)

There is no such thing as the Peerage of Northern Ireland and peers do not represent geographic areas as such. (Note: In the Earl of Antrim's Petition [1967] 1 A.C. 691 it was held that Irish representative peer did, in fact, represent Ireland as an entity, thus on the passing of the Government of Ireland Act 1920 elections from the Irish Peerage could no longer take place, as the Ireland of the Act of Union 1800 ceased to exist.) Some do, however, choose titles which reflect geographical localities, e.g. Lord Kilclooney; this is, however, entirely nominal.

== Current members ==
Name	Party	Entered Lords	Notes
The Lord Alderdice	Liberal Democrat	8 October 1996	former leader of the Alliance Party
The Lord Bew	Crossbencher	26 March 2007	Academic and Chair of the Committee on Standards in Public Life
The Lord Browne of Belmont	DUP	12 June 2006	former MLA and former Lord Mayor of Belfast
The Lord Dodds of Duncairn	DUP	18 September 2020	deputy leader of the DUP and former House of Commons leader of the DUP.
The Lord Eames	Crossbencher	25 August 1995	former Anglican Archbishop of Armagh
The Lord Elliott of Ballinamallard	UUP	16 August 2024	former leader of the Ulster Unionist Party
The Lord Empey	UUP	19 January 2011	former leader of the Ulster Unionist Party
The Baroness Foster of Aghadrumsee	Non-Affiliated	9 November 2022	former First Minister of Northern Ireland and leader of the Democratic Unionist Party
The Lord Hay of Ballyore	DUP	16 December 2014	former Speaker of the Northern Ireland Assembly
The Baroness Hoey	Non-Affiliated	14 September 2020	former Labour Party Westminster MP
The Lord Kilclooney	Crossbencher	17 July 2001	former deputy leader of the Ulster Unionist Party and former Stormont MP
The Lord Lexden	Conservative	23 December 2010	Academic (formerly at The Queen's University, Belfast), and historian.
The Lord Maginnis of Drumglass	Independent Unionist	20 July 2001	former Ulster Unionist Westminster MP; Suspended from the House since 7 September 2020 for "at least 18 months"
The Lord McCrea of Magherafelt and Cookstown	DUP	19 June 2018	former Westminster MP
The Lord Morrow	DUP	7 June 2006	former MLA
The Baroness O'Loan	Crossbencher	11 September 2009	former Police Ombudsman for Northern Ireland
The Baroness O'Neill of Bengarve	Crossbencher	25 February 1999	Academic and President of the British Academy
The Baroness Ritchie of Downpatrick	Labour	16 October 2019	former leader of the Social Democratic and Labour Party
The Lord Rogan	UUP	22 July 1999	former chairman of the Ulster Unionist Party
The Lord Weir of Ballyholme	DUP	16 November 2022	former MLA and former Minister of Education

== Living former members ==
- The Duke of Abercorn, former Ulster Unionist Westminster MP (Note: The Duke of Abercorn lost his seat under section 1 of the House of Lords Act 1999 on 11 November 1999.)
- The Viscount Brookeborough, Elected hereditary peer, grandson of a Prime Minister of Northern Ireland and son of an Ulster Unionist Stormont MP (Note: Viscount Brookeborough lost his seat under section 1 of the House of Lords (Hereditary Peers) Act 2026 on 29 April 2026.)
- The Lord Glentoran, elected hereditary peer, son and grandson of Ulster Unionist Stormont MPs (Note: Lord Glentoran resigned from the House of Lords under section 1 of the House of Lords Reform Act 2014 on 30 October 2017.)
- The Baroness Paisley of St. George's, vice-president of the Democratic Unionist Party, widow of Lord Bannside (Note: Baroness Paisley of St George's resigned from the House of Lords under section 1 of the House of Lords Reform Act 2014 on 1 June 2017.)
- The Lord Rana, Indian-born Belfast businessman (Note: Lord Rana resigned from the House of Lords under section 1 of the House of Lords Reform Act 2014 on 2 July 2024.)

== Deceased members ==
- The 4th Duke of Abercorn, member of the Senate of Northern Ireland.
- The Lord Ballyedmond, businessman and member of the Conservative Party. Previously, he sat as a Fianna Fáil senator in Seanad Éireann in Dublin.
- The Lord Bannside, First Minister of Northern Ireland and founding leader of the Democratic Unionist Party (DUP).
- The Lord Blease, trade unionist and one-time member of the Northern Ireland Labour Party
- The Baroness Blood Trade unionist and women's campaigner
- The 1st Viscount Brookeborough, Prime Minister of Northern Ireland, leader of the Ulster Unionist Party
- The 2nd Viscount Brookeborough, Ulster Unionist Stormont MP
- The Lord Carson, Irish Unionist and latterly Ulster Unionist Westminster MP, leader of the Ulster Unionist Party and Law Lord
- The Lord Carswell, former Lord Chief Justice of Northern Ireland and Law Lord
- The Lord Cooke of Islandreagh, member of the Senate of Northern Ireland
- The 1st Viscount Craigavon, Prime Minister of Northern Ireland, leader of the Ulster Unionist Party
- The 2nd Viscount Craigavon, son of a Prime Minister of Northern Ireland
- The 3rd Viscount Craigavon, Elected hereditary peer, grandson of a Prime Minister of Northern Ireland
- The 4th Lord Dunleath, Alliance Party Stormont MP.
- The Lord Faulkner of Downpatrick, Prime Minister of Northern Ireland, Chief Executive of Northern Ireland, leader of the Ulster Unionist Party
- The Lord Fitt, founder leader of the Social Democratic and Labour Party (SDLP)
- The 1st Lord Glentoran, Ulster Unionist Stormont MP.
- The 2nd Lord Glentoran, Ulster Unionist Stormont MP.
- The Lord Hutton, Lord Chief Justice of Northern Ireland and Law Lord
- The Lord Kerr of Tonaghmore, Justice of the Supreme Court of the United Kingdom, Lord Chief Justice of Northern Ireland and Law Lord
- The Lord Laird, chairman of the Ulster-Scots Agency and Stormont MP
- The Lord Lowry, Lord Chief Justice of Northern Ireland
- The Lord MacDermott, Lord Chief Justice of Northern Ireland
- Lord Mawhinney, Conservative Shadow Home Secretary, Minister without Portfolio, Secretary of State for Transport and Minister of State for Health
- The Lord McConnell, Ulster Unionist Stormont MP
- The Lord Molyneaux of Killead, leader of the Ulster Unionist Party
- The Lord Moyola, Prime Minister of Northern Ireland and Ulster Unionist leader.
- The Lord O'Neill of the Maine, Prime Minister of Northern Ireland, leader of the Ulster Unionist Party.
- The 1st Lord Rathcavan, Ulster Unionist Westminster and Stormont MP.
- The 2nd Lord Rathcavan, Ulster Unionist and, later, Alliance Party politician.
- The 27th Baroness de Ros, suo jure peeress.
- The Lord Smith of Clifton, Liberal Democrat spokesman on Northern Ireland
- The Lord Steinberg, businessman and member of the Conservative Party
- The Lord Trimble First Minister of Northern Ireland, leader of the Ulster Unionist Party.
- The 5th Duke of Westminster, Ulster Unionist Westminster MP.

== See also ==
- Demographics and politics of Northern Ireland
- List of Northern Ireland members of the Privy Council
