= Frank Brooke =

Royal Navy officer

Francis Theophilius Brooke PC, JP, DL (1851 – 30 July 1920) was an Anglo-Irish Director of Dublin and South Eastern Railways and a member of the Earl of Ypres' Advisory Council. He was gunned down, aged 69, by elements of Michael Collins’s IRA squad. He was marked out for his activities as a judge, anti-republican activities, and his friendship with Sir John French. As an Irish Privy Counsellor, Brooke was a signatory of the order proclaiming Dáil Éireann illegal.

== Family ==
Brooke was a cousin of Sir Basil Brooke (who was later created, in 1952, the 1st Viscount Brookeborough), the future Prime Minister of Northern Ireland.

== Career ==
Brooke was also Deputy Lieutenant of County Wicklow and County Fermanagh, a Lieutenant in the Royal Navy, a Justice of the Peace for County Fermanagh and an Irish Privy Counsellor (1918), thus he was styled The Rt. Hon. Francis Brooke.

In July 1912 he had attended the house party at Wentworth Woodhouse hosted for George V's stay there.

== Death ==
On 30 July 1920, Brooke was killed at his Dublin offices, allegedly by Irish Republican Army (IRA) members Paddy Daly, Tom Keogh and Jim Slattery, in view of a colleague, who was spared. The inquest found Brooke had a pistol in his jacket pocket. Brooke's killing has been termed the only outright political assassination of the Irish War of Independence.
