= Brooke baronets of Almondbury (1919) =

Escutcheon of the Brooke baronets of Almondbury

The Brooke baronetcy, of Almondbury in the West Riding of the County of York, was created in the Baronetage of the United Kingdom on 13 September 1919 for John Brooke, a Director of John Brooke & Sons, of Huddersfield, and a Justice of the Peace for the West Riding of Yorkshire and Ross-shire. He was the younger brother of the 1st Baronet of the 1899 creation.

He was succeeded by his eldest surviving son, Robert, the 2nd Baronet. He was a Deputy Lieutenant of Ross and Cromarty. His eldest son, John, the 3rd Baronet, was a justice of the peace and Deputy Lieutenant for Ross-shire. As of 2026, the title is held by his son, the 4th Baronet, who succeeded in 1983.

== Brooke baronets, of Almondbury (1919) ==
- Sir John Arthur Brooke, 1st Baronet (1844–1920) married 1873, Blanche, daughter of Major Charles Samuel Weston, of Morvich, Sutherland.
- Sir Robert Weston Brooke, 2nd Baronet (1885–1942) married 1909, Margery Jean, daughter of businessman Alexander Geddes, of Blairmore, Aberdeenshire (also great-great-grandfather of David Cameron).
- Sir John Weston Brooke, 3rd Baronet (1911–1983) married firstly, in 1945, Rosemary, daughter of Percy Llewelyn Nevill (grandson of William Nevill, 4th Earl of Abergavenny).
- Sir Alistair Weston Brooke, 4th Baronet (born 1947)

The heir presumptive is the present holder's nephew, John Weston Brooke (born 1992).
