= Brookeborough railway station =

Railway station in Brookeborough, Northern Ireland

Brookeborough
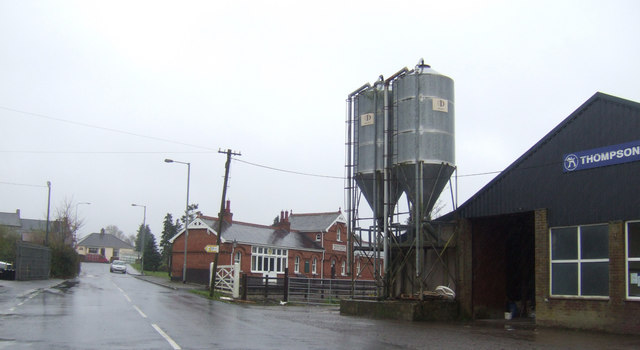
- Brookeborough station and level crossing gate, which are still in evidence next to an agricultural feed supplier.

General information
- Location: Brookeborough, County Fermanagh, Northern Ireland; UK
- Coordinates: 54.314236°N 7.408536°W

History
- Post-grouping: Clogher Valley Railway

Key dates
- 2 May 1887: Station opens
- 1 January 1942: Station closes
Location

Brookeborough railway station first opened by the Clogher Valley Railway, which is a three foot gauge line. It opened in May 1887 and closed on 1 January 1942 (with the last trains running the previous day). The station is in the village of Brookeborough, in County Fermanagh, Northern Ireland.
