= Eighneachán Ó hAnnluain =

Irish politician (1933–1994)

- Ó hAnnluain, c. 1957

Teachta Dála
- In office March 1957 – October 1961
- Constituency: Monaghan

Personal details
- Born: 1933 County Monaghan, Ireland
- Died: 14 December 1994 (aged 60–61) County Monaghan, Ireland
- Party: Sinn Féin
- Relatives: Fergal O'Hanlon (brother)

Éighneachán Ó hAnnluain (Irish pronunciation: [ˈeːnʲəxaːn̪ˠ oː ˈhan̪ˠl̪ˠuənʲ]; 1933 – 14 December 1994; sometimes spelled Éineachán) was an Irish Sinn Féin politician. He was elected as a Teachta Dála (TD) at the 1957 general election for the Monaghan constituency. He was one of four successful Sinn Féin candidates in that election, the others being Ruairí Ó Brádaigh, John Joe McGirl and John Joe Rice. None of the four took their seats, for Sinn Féin ran on an abstentionist platform.

In 1960, he was imprisoned for one month in Mountjoy Prison after refusing to pay a fine for the offence of collecting money for republican prisoners' dependents without a permit.

He did not contest the 1961 general election.

Ó hAnnluain died on 14 December 1994, aged 61, in Monaghan.

His brother Fergal O'Hanlon was a member of the anti-Treaty Irish Republican Army. From 1999 until 2012, his sister Pádraigín Uí Mhurchadha was a Monaghan town councillor for Sinn Féin.

Dáil	Election	Deputy (Party)	Deputy (Party)	Deputy (Party)
2nd	1921	Seán MacEntee (SF)	Eoin O'Duffy (SF)	Ernest Blythe (SF)
3rd	1922	Patrick MacCarvill (AT-SF)	Eoin O'Duffy (PT-SF)	Ernest Blythe (PT-SF)
4th	1923	Patrick MacCarvill (Rep)	Patrick Duffy (CnaG)	Ernest Blythe (CnaG)
5th	1927 (Jun)	Patrick MacCarvill (FF)	Alexander Haslett (Ind.)	Ernest Blythe (CnaG)
6th	1927 (Sep)	Conn Ward (FF)	Alexander Haslett (Ind.)	Ernest Blythe (CnaG)
7th	1932	Conn Ward (FF)	Eamon Rice (FF)	Ernest Blythe (CnaG)
8th	1933	Conn Ward (FF)	Eamon Rice (FF)	Alexander Haslett (Ind.)
9th	1937	Conn Ward (FF)	Eamon Rice (FF)	James Dillon (FG)
10th	1938	Conn Ward (FF)	Bridget Rice (FF)	James Dillon (FG)
11th	1943	Conn Ward (FF)	Bridget Rice (FF)	James Dillon (Ind.)
12th	1944	Conn Ward (FF)	Bridget Rice (FF)	James Dillon (Ind.)
13th	1948	Patrick Maguire (FF)	Bridget Rice (FF)	James Dillon (Ind.)
14th	1951	Patrick Maguire (FF)	Bridget Rice (FF)	James Dillon (Ind.)
15th	1954	Patrick Mooney (FF)	Edward Kelly (FF)	James Dillon (FG)
16th	1957	Patrick Mooney (FF)	Eighneachán Ó hAnnluain (SF)	James Dillon (FG)
17th	1961	Patrick Mooney (FF)	Erskine H. Childers (FF)	James Dillon (FG)
18th	1965	Patrick Mooney (FF)	Erskine H. Childers (FF)	James Dillon (FG)
19th	1969	Billy Fox (FG)	Erskine H. Childers (FF)	John Conlan (FG)
20th	1973	Jimmy Leonard (FF)	Erskine H. Childers (FF)	John Conlan (FG)
20th	1973 by-election	Jimmy Leonard (FF)	Brendan Toal (FG)	John Conlan (FG)
21st	1977	Constituency abolished. See Cavan–Monaghan		
