= Sean South (song) =

1957 song about Seán South written by Seán Costello

“Sean South of Garryowen” is a song about Seán South (written by Seán Costello), a member of the Pearse Column of the Irish Republican Army, who was fatally wounded during the attack on Brookeborough barracks in 1957. It is sung to the same tune as "Roddy McCorley". The words were first published in The Irish Catholic, the Irish weekly Roman Catholic newspaper, within a week of South's death.

Contrary to popular belief, South was not from the area of Garryowen, this being poetic licence on the part of the writer. It has also been satirised in the Rubberbandits song "Up da Ra", from their 2011 album Serious About Men.
