= John Brooke, 2nd Viscount Brookeborough =

Northern Irish politician (1922–1987)

The Right Honourable The Viscount Brookeborough PC (NI)

Parliamentary Secretary to the Prime Minister of Northern Ireland
- In office 1970–1972
- Preceded by: Daniel McGladdery
- Succeeded by: Office abolished

Member of the House of Lords Lord Temporal
- In office 19 August 1973 – 5 March 1987; Hereditary Peerage
- Preceded by: The 1st Viscount Brookeborough
- Succeeded by: The 3rd Viscount Brookeborough

Member of the Northern Ireland Parliament for Lisnaskea
- In office 22 March 1968 – 28 June 1973
- Preceded by: The 1st Viscount Brookeborough (known as Sir Basil Brooke up until 1952)
- Succeeded by: constituency abolished

Personal details
- Born: 9 November 1922
- Died: 5 March 1987 (aged 64)
- Party: Ulster Unionist Party

John Warden Brooke, 2nd Viscount Brookeborough, PC (NI) (9 November 1922 – 5 March 1987), was a Northern Irish politician. He was the son of the 1st Viscount Brookeborough, third Prime Minister of Northern Ireland.

== Early life ==
He was educated at Eton College. During the Second World War he served in the British Army in North Africa, Italy and Germany. He was on the personal staff of Field Marshal Sir Harold Alexander (later created Lord Alexander). He was an Aide-de-Camp to Field Marshal Lord Wavell, the Viceroy of India, early in 1947.

In 1934, his father claimed in the House of Commons of Northern Ireland at Stormont that there had been a plot to kidnap the young John Brooke by Irish Republicans during Sir Basil Brooke's time as Commandant of the Ulster Special Constabulary (USC). This report led Sir Basil (as he then was) to dismiss every Catholic worker in his employ, for which he was accused of sectarianism.

== Political career ==
As Captain John Brooke, he was elected to Fermanagh County Council for the Ulster Unionist Party (UUP) in 1947, serving until 1973, and was Chairman of the council from 1961 to 1973. He was appointed High Sheriff of Fermanagh for 1955. He succeeded his father as the UUP Stormont MP for Lisnaskea in a by-election on 22 March 1968. He retained that seat until the abolition of the Parliament of Northern Ireland in 1973.

Brookeborough (when he was still Captain Brooke) was a member of a dissident group of Ulster Unionist backbench MPs who campaigned for the removal of Terence O'Neill as Prime Minister of Northern Ireland. When O'Neill finally resigned in April 1969 his successor, Major James Chichester-Clark, brought some of this dissident group into his government. Capt. Brooke was made Parliamentary Secretary at the Ministry of Commerce (1969–1970), and then Parliamentary Secretary at the Department of the Prime Minister (1970–1972). Under Brian Faulkner's premiership, he was Government Chief Whip (1971–1972) and also served in the Cabinet from 1971 as Minister of State in the Ministry of Finance.

In the Northern Ireland Assembly (1973–74) he represented North Down. When the Unionist Party of Northern Ireland (UPNI) was founded by pro-Sunningdale Agreement members of the UUP, Brooke joined in 1974 and was again elected for North Down to the Northern Ireland Constitutional Convention (1975–76). He also represented the views of the UPNI in the House of Lords from 1973.

At 5:13pm on 28 March 1972, Capt. Brooke delivered the final speech from the dispatch box in the House of Commons of Northern Ireland at Stormont prior to the proroguing of the Parliament of Northern Ireland by Edward Heath's Conservative government. In it, he quoted from a poem by Rudyard Kipling entitled Ulster, written in 1914, about the time his father's involvement in Ulster loyalism might be said to have begun. It ended:

"Before an empire's eyes the traitor claims his price.
What need of further lies? We are the sacrifice."

== Family ==
Lord Brookeborough married Rosemary Chichester, daughter of Lieutenant-Colonel Arthur O'Neill Cubitt Chichester, of Galgorm Castle, County Antrim, in 1949. They had five children: Alan, Christopher, Juliana, Melinda, and Susanna. Rosemary, Lady Brookeborough, died in January 2007. She had lived at Ashbrooke House, the dower house on the family's Colebrooke Estate near Brookeborough in County Fermanagh, for many years.

== See also ==
- List of Northern Ireland Members of the House of Lords

Parliament of Northern Ireland
Preceded by Basil Brooke	Member of Parliament for Lisnaskea; 1968–1973	Parliament abolished
Northern Ireland Assembly (1973)
New assembly	Assembly Member for North Down; 1973–1974	Assembly abolished
Northern Ireland Constitutional Convention
New convention	Member for North Down; 1975–1976	Convention dissolved
Party political offices
Preceded by John Dobson	Ulster Unionist Chief Whip; 1971–1972	Office abolished
Political offices
Vacant	Parliamentary Secretary to the Ministry of Commerce and Production; 1969–1971	Office abolished
Preceded by Daniel McGladdery	Parliamentary Secretary, Department of the Prime Minister (Northern Ireland); 1970–1972	Office abolished
New office	Minister of State, Ministry of Finance; 1971–1972	Office abolished
Peerage of the United Kingdom
Preceded by Basil Brooke	Viscount Brookeborough; 1973–1987	Succeeded by Alan Brooke
