= Downshire Cliffs =

Cliffs of Antarctica

Coordinates: 71°37′S 170°36′E

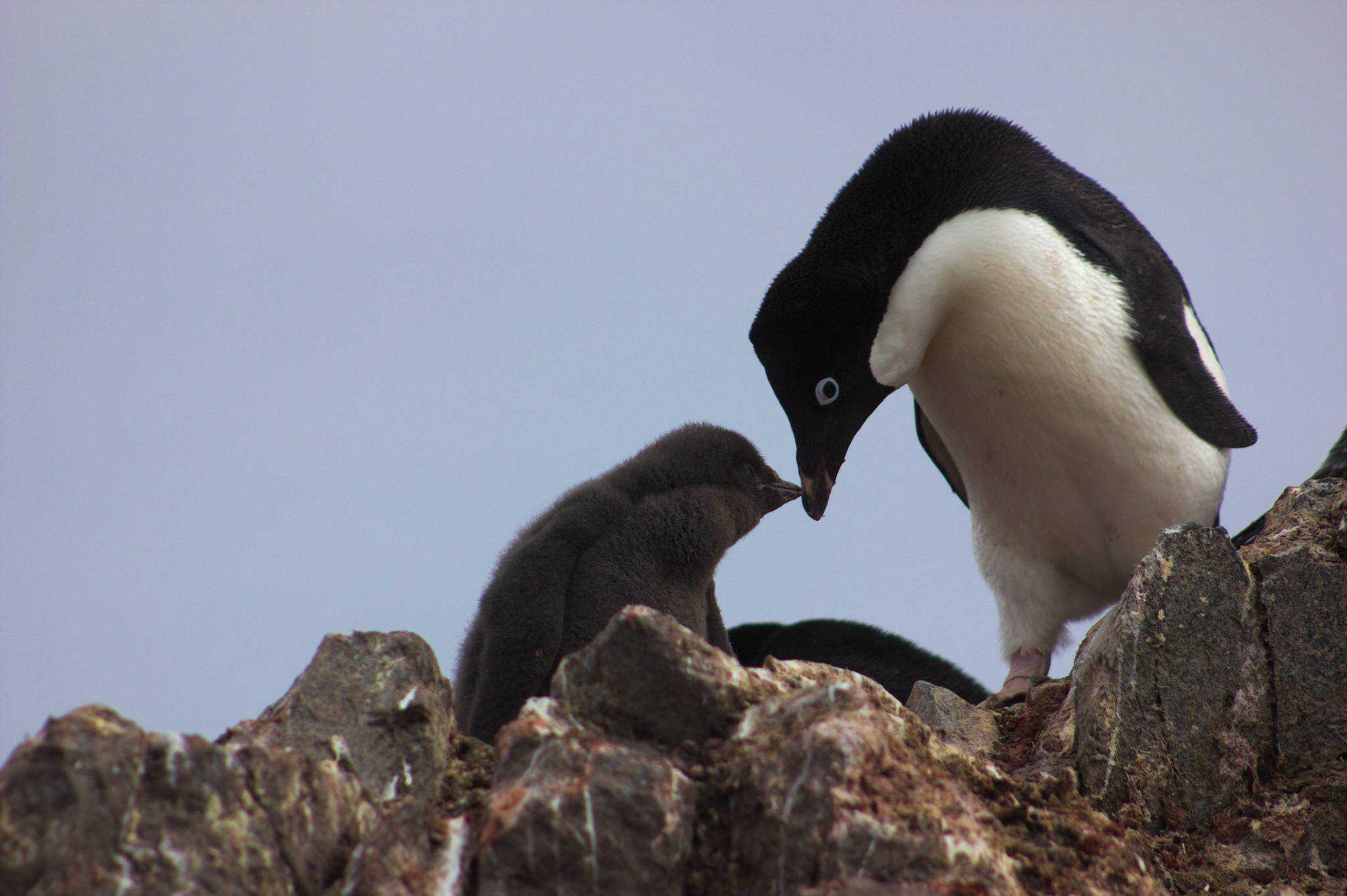
Large numbers of Adélie penguins breed on the slopes beneath the cliffs

The Downshire Cliffs are a line of precipitous basalt cliffs rising to 2,000 m above the Ross Sea and forming much of the eastern side of the Adare Peninsula, along the Borchgrevink Coast of northern Victoria Land, Antarctica. The nearest permanent research stations are the Italian Mario Zucchelli and South Korean Jang Bogo Stations some 400 km to the south in Terra Nova Bay.

== Discovery and naming ==
In 1841 Captain James Clark Ross applied the name "Cape Downshire" to a part of these cliffs. He did so at the request of Commander Francis Crozier of HMS Downshire, which itself was named after County Down. No prominent cape exists here and, for the sake of historical continuity, the name was reapplied to the cliffs.

== Important Bird Area ==
A 243 ha site comprising the ice-free slopes beneath the cliffs has been designated an Important Bird Area (IBA) by BirdLife International because it supports about 20,000 breeding pairs of Adélie penguins, the number based on counts carried out over five seasons sampled between 1981 and 2012.
