= Downshire School =

Coordinates: 54.729°N 5.790°W

Information
- School type: Secondary school
- Established: 1977
- Teaching staff: 59
- Gender: Mixed
- Age: 11 to 18
- Enrollment: 803

Downshire Community School was a co-educational, 11-18 secondary school in Carrickfergus, County Antrim, Northern Ireland, situated on Downshire Road. Downshire is a Specialist School in Business Studies and Enterprise with Sport. The school opened in 1977 and had an enrolment of 803 pupils and 59 teachers.

The school includes twenty general classrooms occupied by the English, Drama, Media Studies, Mathematics, Business Studies, Social Studies, French, Special Educational Needs and Religious Education Departments.

Two Computer Suites, two Music Rooms with separate sound-proofed Practice Rooms, a Business Studies room with Computer network facility, six Science rooms, Animal House and Art Block with Dark Room, Technology and Design block consisting of three multi-material manufacturing rooms, one systems/multi manufacturing room, one systems design room and three planning areas.

Two Home Economics rooms, a careers area, Library, Lecture Theatre with Drama area, a cafeteria, a sports block with Sports Hall, Minor Games Area, Social Area, Coffee Bar, Committee Room, Changing and Shower rooms. Externally there are extensive playing fields with three all-weather pitches and two grass pitches and a Garden area. The largest block of the school building has three floors. Facing east the third floor classrooms include panoramic views across Belfast Lough, and the County Down coastline. The Art and Technology corridors circle an enclosed garden, the garden is an extensive plot of trees and a large rockery. The garden is also home to the schools pet club and garden club.

Downshire School merged with Carrickfergus College and they became Carrickfergus Academy

Downshire also has a youth club which operates weekdays Monday-Thursday. The club has many activities such as football.
