= Robert Jackson Hanvey =

England international rugby union player

Robert Jackson Hanvey, born at Blennerhasset, Cumbria, on 16 August 1899, was an English sportsman.

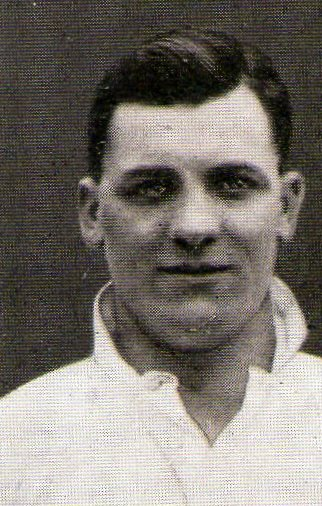
R. J. Hanvey, Aspatria and England

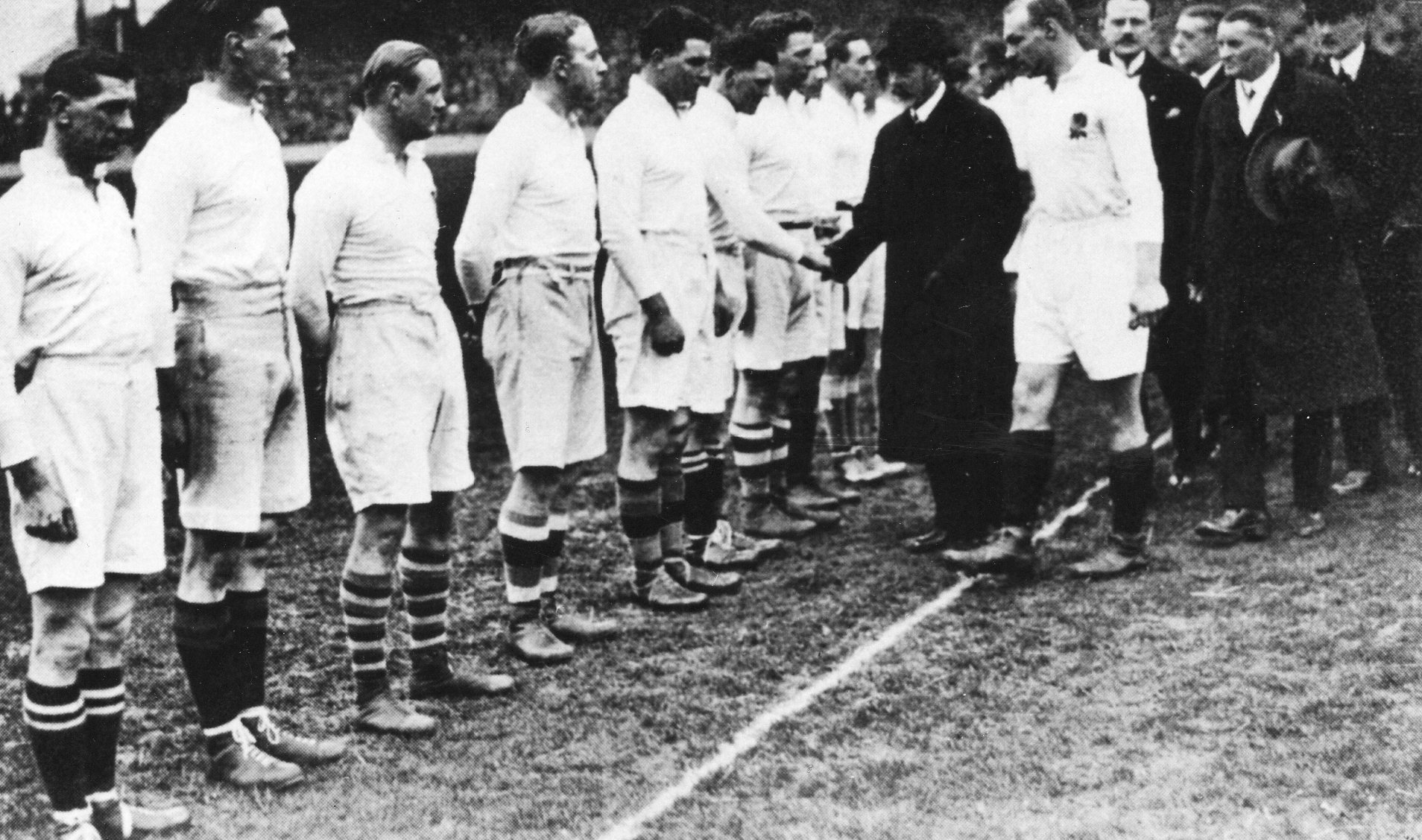
Twickenham 1926, Bob Hanvey & Tosh Holliday, presented to the King

Robert Jackson Hanvey, or Bob as he preferred, was born at Blennerhasset Cumbria on 16 August 1899. Conscripted into the Border Regiment in 1918, he took up Rugby Union and joined the newly formed Blennerhasset 'Reds' in the following season. Strongly built and of fine physique, his ability as a prop forward was quickly recognised. He gained the first of his forty-seven Cumberland County caps in 1919 and with a few exceptions, through injury, continued to play until 1929. He was a member of the Cumberland County team which won the English County Championship, when they defeated Kent in 1924. In 1922, he represented the North in their annual game against the South, an honour he would repeat on five further occasions. He also played in five international trial matches. In 1923, he joined Aspatria RUFC and helped them to gain three victories in the Cumberland County Cup. The year 1926, was the pinnacle of Bob's playing career, playing in all four of the Home international series; against Wales at Cardiff, Ireland at Dublin, and Scotland and France at Twickenham. Although tipped to play for England again in 1929, he received an injury before the final trial. Contemporary reports described him as:

"A forward of the bustling type, a good tackler, with a rare turn of speed, and a man who can last the full eighty minutes."

After he retired from the game in 1931, he became a respected referee and handled county games in his third season; and elected to the international panel of referees in 1937. As a referee he officiated at the North versus South match at Twickenham, England versus The Rest of the World, and the English Midlands versus the New Zealand All Blacks; in addition to several international trial games. He served as Cumberland and Westmorland Rugby Union County president between 1956 and 1958, and afterwards elected one of its few life members. In 1965 he became president of Aspatria RUFC a position he held until his death on 17 October 1989. Perhaps his greatest achievement came in 1971, when he addressed the Rugby Union Centenary Congress at Cambridge University. Bob enthralled the representative's from forty-nine countries with a memorable speech entitled: – "What the game meant to me." Dickie Jeeps remarked at the time.

"Bob put everyone’s thoughts into words, it was straight from the heart and extremely moving."

Sir William Ramsay, President of the Rugby Football Union added:-

We gave much thought as to whom we should invite as speaker. We thought we wanted to have a typical great man representative of Rugby Football, so we came to Aspatria and invited the president Mr Bob Hanvey to Corpus Christi College, and no-one could have spoken better."
