= Sir Thomas Brooke, 1st Baronet =

British justice and baronet (1830–1908)

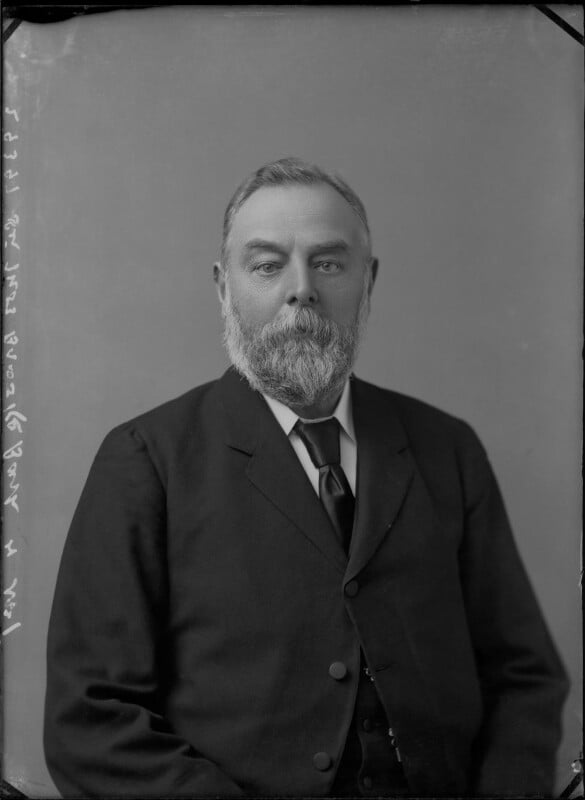
Brooke in 1899

Sir Thomas Brooke, 1st Baronet, DL, JP, FRSA (31 May 1830 in Honley – 16 July 1908 in Huddersfield) was a British textile manufacturer and merchant, created a baronet on 4 August 1899.

== Life ==
The son of Thomas Brooke of Northgate House, Honley, Yorkshire, and his wife Ann Ingham, daughter of Joseph Ingham of Hunslet, Thomas Brooke the younger was born into the Brooke family, who had a long-established woollens business: John Brooke & Sons built a new mill in 1828. He was educated at Cheltenham College and then went into John Brooke & Sons at the Armitage Bridge mills. He retired from the business in 1879.

=== Political candidate ===
Brooke twice stood unsuccessfully for Parliament, standing as a Conservative. In 1874 he was defeated by Edward Leatham at Huddersfield, and in 1885 he lost at Colne Valley to Henry Frederick Beaumont.

=== Interests ===
Brooke became a Chairman of Quarter Sessions for the West Riding of Yorkshire and Commanding Officer of the 5th Administrative Battalion, Yorkshire West Riding Rifle Volunteer Corps.

== Family ==
Brooke married firstly, in 1854, Eliza (d. 1855), daughter of Enoch Vickerman; their son, Francis Thomas, was born in 1855 and predeceased his father in 1872. He married secondly, in 1860, Amelia (d. 1901), daughter of David Dewar, of Dunfermline, Fife; his third wife was Mary (d. 1938), daughter of James Priestley, J.P., of Bankfield, Huddersfield, Yorkshire, and widow of Rev. Charles Farrar Forster.

Escutcheon of the Brooke baronets of Armitage Bridge

Baronetage of the United Kingdom
New creation	Baronet (of Armitage Bridge); 1899–1908	Extinct
Preceded by Way baronets	Brooke baronets of Armitage Bridge; 4 August 1899	Succeeded by Hoare baronets
