= Viscount Brookeborough =

Viscountcy in the Peerage of the United Kingdom

Viscountcy Brookeborough
- Arms: Or, a Cross engrailed per pale Gules and Sable, a Crescent for difference. The arms also display a canton of a baronet. Crest: A Brock or Badger passant proper. Supporters: Dexter: A Dolphin Sable; Sinister: A Lion double-queued Gules, langued Azure.
- Creation date: 5 July 1952
- Created by: Queen Elizabeth II
- Peerage: Peerage of the United Kingdom
- First holder: Sir Basil Brooke, 5th Baronet ‘of Colebrooke’
- Present holder: Alan Brooke, 3rd Viscount Brookeborough
- Heir presumptive: Hon. Christopher Brooke
- Remainder to: The 1st Viscount’s heirs male of the body lawfully begotten
- Subsidiary titles: Baronet ‘of Colebrooke'
- Status: Extant
- Seat: Colebrooke Park
- Motto: GLORIA FINIS (Glory to the end)

Viscount Brookeborough, of Colebrooke in the County of Fermanagh, is a title in the Peerage of the United Kingdom. It was created in 1952 for the Ulster Unionist politician and Prime Minister of Northern Ireland, Captain The Rt. Hon. Sir Basil Brooke, 5th Bt., P.C. (N.I.), M.P.

== History ==
The Brooke family descends from Sir Basil Brooke (born 1567), a captain in the English Army in Ireland and Governor of County Donegal in West Ulster, who was granted extensive lands in that county. His son, Sir Henry Brooke (died 1671), was granted the lands of and around Achadh Lon (renamed in English as Brookeborough) in County Fermanagh, also in West Ulster. He was Governor of County Donegal and a Member of the Irish Parliament for Brookeborough. His son, Thomas Brooke (died c. 1696), of Colebrooke, County Fermanagh, was a Member of the Irish Parliament and supporter of William III and Mary II. The estates were forfeited by James II.

Next in line, the son, Henry Brooke (1671–1761), represented Dundalk and County Fermanagh in the Irish Parliament. His younger son was Francis Brooke, of Colebrooke. His son, Henry Brooke, was created a baronet, of Colebrooke in the County of Fermanagh, in the Baronetage of the United Kingdom on 7 January 1822. He was succeeded by his son, Arthur, the second Baronet. He was Conservative Member of Parliament for County Fermanagh at Westminster.

On his death in 1854, the title passed to his eldest son, Victor, the third Baronet. He served as a Deputy Lieutenant and was High Sheriff of County Fermanagh in 1867. His eldest son, Arthur, the fourth Baronet, was Sheriff of County Fermanagh in 1896 and a Deputy Lieutenant and Justice of the Peace for the county. He was succeeded by his eldest son, the aforementioned fifth Baronet, who was elevated to the peerage in 1952. His second but eldest surviving son, the second Viscount, was also a controversial politician. As of 2017 the titles are held by the latter's eldest son, the third Viscount, who succeeded in 1987. He was one of the ninety elected hereditary peers that remained in the House of Lords after the passing of the House of Lords Act 1999 and before the passing of the House of Lords (Hereditary Peers) Act 2026, sitting as a cross-bencher. Hereditary peers lost

Numerous other members of the Brooke family have also gained distinction. Arthur Brooke, uncle of the first Baronet, was created a baronet in 1764 (see Brooke baronets). Sir Arthur Brooke (died 1843), brother of the first Baronet, was a lieutenant-general in the British Army. Richard Prittie Brooke (died 1836), younger brother of the first Baronet, was a major-general in the British Army. George Brooke, grandson of George Frederick Brooke, brother of the first Baronet, was created a baronet in 1903 (see Brooke baronets, of Summerton).

George Augustus Frederick Brooke, younger son of the first Baronet, was the father of 1) Arthur Thomas Brooke (died 1893), a captain in the Royal Navy, 2) Henry Francis Brooke (1836–1880), a brigadier-general in the British Army, 3) Lionel Godolphin Brooke (1849–1931), a brigadier-general in the Connaught Rangers, and 4) Frank Brooke (1851–1920), a businessman and public servant. The latter was the grandfather of Frank Hastings Brooke (1909–1982), a major-general in the Federation Army of Malaya, and Oliver George Brooke (born 1911), a brigadier in the Welch Regiment.

Sir Harry Vesey Brooke (1845–1921), younger son of the second Baronet, was a Deputy Lieutenant and Justice of the Peace. Arthur Basil Brooke (1847–1884), younger son of the second Baronet, was the father of Sir Basil Vernon Brooke (1876–1945), a rear admiral in the Royal Navy, and of Sir Bertram Norman Sergison-Brooke (1880–1967), a lieutenant-general in the British Army. The noted military strategist and commander Field Marshal The 1st Viscount Alanbrooke, sometime Chief of the Imperial General Staff, was the sixth son of the third Baronet (see the Viscount Alanbrooke for further history of this branch of the family).

The family seat is Colebrooke Park, near Enniskillen, County Fermanagh.

== Brooke baronets, of Colebrooke (1822) ==
- Sir Henry Brooke, 1st Baronet (1770–1834)
- Sir Arthur Brinsley Brooke, 2nd Baronet (1797–1854)
- Sir Victor Alexander Brooke, 3rd Baronet (1843–1891)
- Sir Arthur Douglas Brooke, 4th Baronet (1865–1907)
- Sir Basil Stanlake Brooke, 5th Baronet (1888–1973) (created Viscount Brookeborough in 1952)

== Viscounts Brookeborough (1952) ==
- Basil Stanlake Brooke, 1st Viscount Brookeborough (1888–1973)
- John Warden Brooke, 2nd Viscount Brookeborough (1922–1987)
- Alan Henry Brooke, 3rd Viscount Brookeborough (b. 1952)

The heir presumptive is the present holder's brother, the Hon. Christopher Arthur Brooke (b. 1954).
The heir presumptive's heir apparent is his son, Archie Alan John Brooke (b. 1991).

== Line of succession to the titles ==
- Sir Henry Brooke, 1st Baronet, of Colebrooke (1770–1834)
  - Sir Arthur Brinsley Brooke, 2nd Baronet (1797–1854)
    - Sir Victor Alexander Brooke, 3rd Baronet (1843–1891)
      - Sir Arthur Douglas Brooke, 4th Baronet (1865–1907)
        - Basil Stanlake Brooke, 1st Viscount Brookeborough (1888–1973)
          - John Warden Brooke, 2nd Viscount Brookeborough (1922–1987)
            - Lt-Col Alan Henry Brooke, 3rd Viscount Brookeborough (born 1952) Elected to remain in 1999.
            - (1) Hon. Christopher Arthur Clarke Brooke (b. 1954)
              - (2) Archie Alan John Brooke (b. 1991)
              - (3) Henry Arthur Oliver Brooke (b. 1993)
              - (4) Mathew Victor Francis Brooke (b. 1995)
              - (5) Arthur George Basil Brooke (b. 2000)
    - Arthur Basil Brooke (1847–1884)
      - Lt-Gen Sir Bertram Norman Sergison-Brooke (1880–1967)
        - Timothy Mark Sergison-Brooke (1924–2005)
          - (6) Nicholas Mark Sergison-Brooke (b. 1966)
  - George Augustus Frederick Brooke (1805–1874)
    - Brig-Gen Henry Francis Brooke (1836–1880)
      - Major George Cecil Brooke (1870–1915)
        - Commander Henry John Allen Brooke (1913–2003)
          - (7) Colonel Michael Henry Hastings Brooke (b. 1948)
            - (8) Simon Mark Hastings Brooke (b. 1974)
            - (9) James Matthew Crowdy Brooke (b. 1976)
          - (10) Dr. George John Brooke (b. 1952)
            - (11) Peter George Brooke (b. 1979)
            - (12) David John Brooke (b. 1981)
    - Rt. Hon. Francis Theophilius Brooke (1851–1920)
      - Lt-Col George Frank Brooke (1878–1966)
        - Maj-Gen Frank Hastings Brooke (1909–1982)
          - (13) Major George Hugo Hastings Brooke (b. 1936)
            - (14) Andrew Robert Hastings Brooke (b. 1969)
          - Nigel Francis Brooke (1937-2021)

Only those numbered (1) – (5) are in line to succeed to the Viscountcy, all others are only in line to succeed to the Baronetcy.

== See also ==
- Viscount Alanbrooke
- Brooke baronets

== Notes ==
Baronetage of the United Kingdom
Preceded by FitzGerald baronets	Brooke baronets of Colebrooke; 7 January 1822	Succeeded by Silvester baronets
