= Downshire Hospital =

- South Eastern Health and Social Care Trust
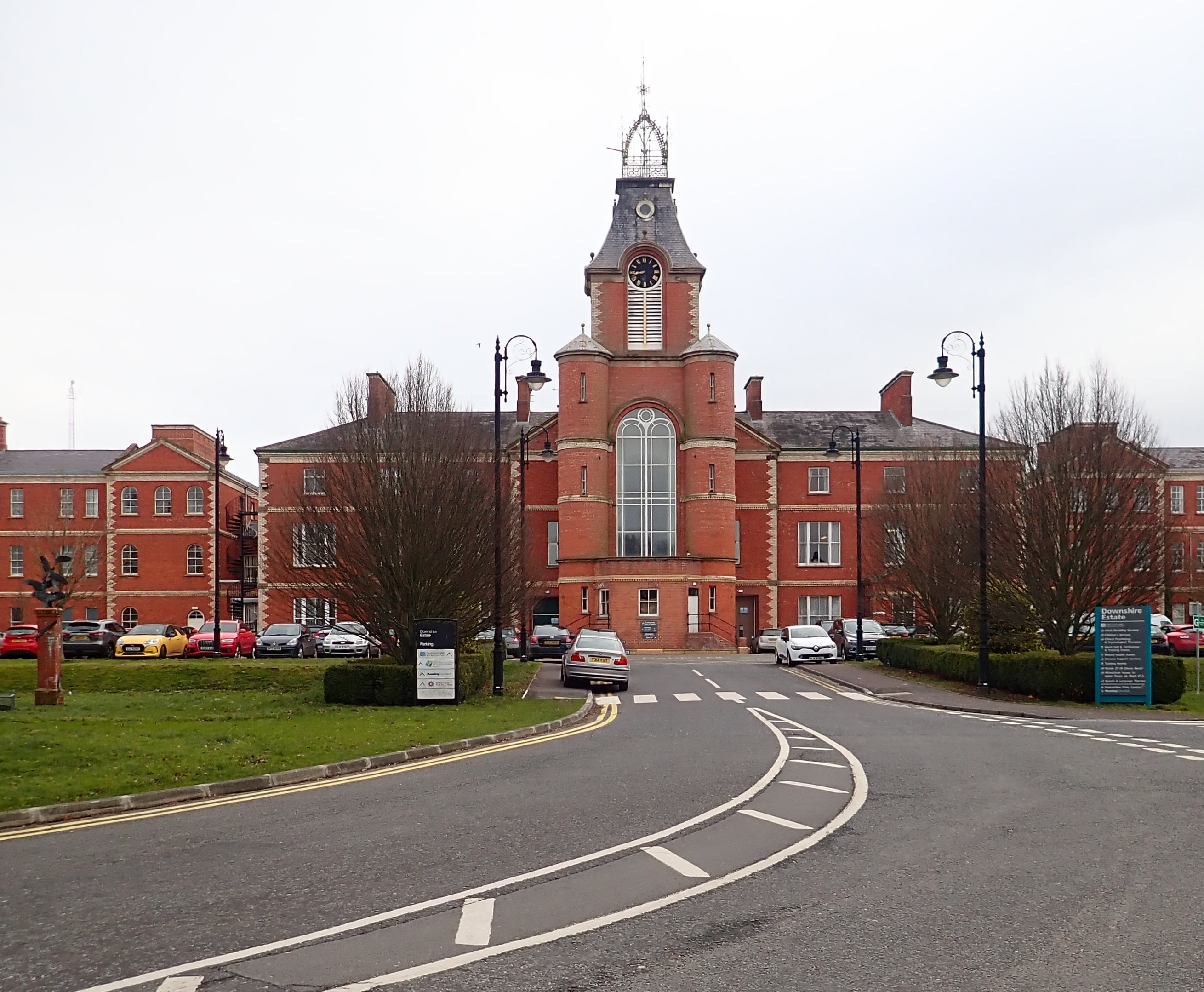
- Downshire Hospital

- Shown in Northern Ireland

Geography
- Location: Downpatrick, County Down, Northern Ireland
- Coordinates: 54.32267°N 5.69459°W

Organisation
- Type: Specialist

Services
- Speciality: Psychiatric hospital

History
- Founded: 1869

The Downshire Hospital is a 16-bed psychiatric hospital at Downpatrick, County Down, Northern Ireland, for both psychiatric intensive-care patients and low secure rehabilitation.

== History ==
The hospital, which was designed by Henry Smyth, was opened as the Down Lunatic Asylum in 1869. It was extended in 1883, 1895 and 1904. It became the Down Mental Hospital in the 1920s and joined the National Health Service as Downshire Hospital in 1948. Following the introduction of Care in the Community in the early 1980s, the hospital went into a period of decline and provision for patients reduced from over 300 beds to just 16. Part of the building was subsequently converted for use as offices for Down District Council who began operating there in October 2012.
