= Basil Brooke, 1st Viscount Brookeborough =

Prime Minister of Northern Ireland from 1943 to 1963

The Right Honourable The Viscount Brookeborough KG CBE MC TD PC (NI)
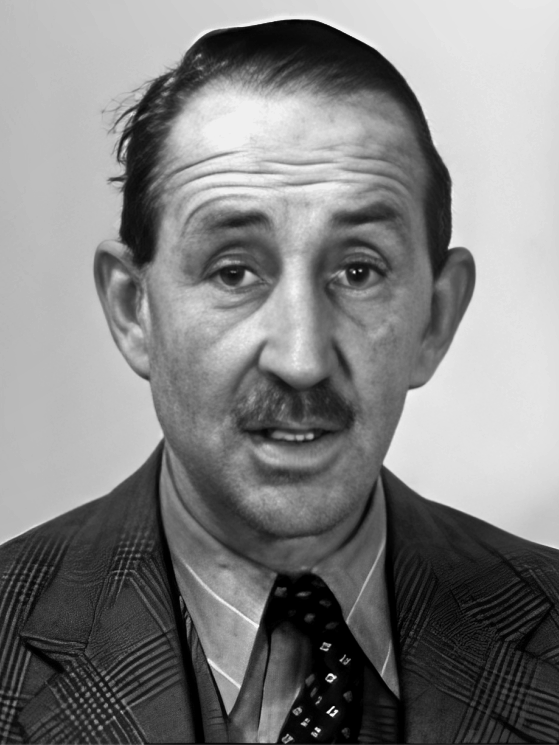
- Brooke in 1941

3rd Prime Minister of Northern Ireland
- In office 1 May 1943 – 26 March 1963
- Monarchs: George VI; Elizabeth II
- Governor: The Duke of Abercorn; The Earl Granville; The Lord Wakehurst
- Preceded by: J. M. Andrews
- Succeeded by: Terence O'Neill

6th Lord Lieutenant of Fermanagh
- In office 26 April 1963 – February 1969
- Monarch: Elizabeth II
- Preceded by: Earl of Enniskillen
- Succeeded by: Vacant (1969–1971); Thomas Scott (1971–1976)

6th Leader of the Ulster Unionist Party
- In office 1 May 1946 – 25 March 1963
- Preceded by: J. M. Andrews
- Succeeded by: Terence O'Neill

Minister of Commerce
- In office 16 January 1941 – 16 February 1945
- Prime Minister: J. M. Andrews; Himself
- Preceded by: John Milne Barbour
- Succeeded by: Roland Nugent

Minister of Agriculture
- In office 1 December 1933 – 16 January 1941
- Prime Minister: The Viscount Craigavon; J. M. Andrews
- Preceded by: Sir Edward Archdale
- Succeeded by: The Lord Glentoran

Member of the House of Lords Lord Temporal
- In office 5 July 1952 – 18 August 1973; Hereditary Peerage
- Preceded by: Peerage created
- Succeeded by: The 2nd Viscount Brookeborough

Member of the Northern Ireland Parliament for Lisnaskea
- In office 22 May 1929 – 22 March 1968
- Preceded by: New constituency
- Succeeded by: John Brooke

Personal details
- Born: 9 June 1888 Colebrooke Park, Brookeborough, County Fermanagh, Ireland
- Died: 18 August 1973 (aged 85) Colebrooke Park, Brookeborough, County Fermanagh, Northern Ireland
- Party: Ulster Unionist Party
- Spouses: Cynthia Brooke (m. 1919; died 1970) Sarah Eileen Bell Calvert (m. 1971)
- Children: 3
- Education: Winchester College
- Alma mater: Royal Military College, Sandhurst

Military service
- Allegiance: United Kingdom
- Branch/service: British Army
- Years of service: 1908–1920
- Rank: Captain
- Unit: Royal Fusiliers; 10th Hussars
- Battles/wars: First World War
- Awards: Military Cross; Croix de Guerre (France)

Basil Stanlake Brooke, 1st Viscount Brookeborough (9 June 1888 – 18 August 1973), styled Sir Basil Brooke, 5th Baronet, between 1907 and 1952, and commonly referred to as Lord Brookeborough, was an Ulster Unionist Party (UUP) politician who served as the third Prime Minister of Northern Ireland from May 1943, until March 1963.

Lord Brookeborough had previously held several ministerial positions in the Government of Northern Ireland, and has been described as "perhaps the last Unionist leader to command respect, loyalty and affection across the social and political spectrum". Equally well, he has also been described as one of the most hard-line anti-Catholic leaders of the UUP, and his legacy involves founding his own paramilitary group, which fed in to the reactivation of the Ulster Volunteers (UVF). It has also been said that his "amateurish governance visibly failed to address the province's economic problems" and that his prejudiced pronouncements, notably his 1933 calls for exclusive Protestant employment and denunciations of Catholics, significantly exacerbated sectarian tensions in Northern Ireland.

== Early life ==
Basil Stanlake Brooke was born on 9 June 1888 at Colebrooke Park, his family's neo-Classical ancestral seat on (what was then) the several-thousand acre Colebrooke Estate, just outside Brookeborough, a village near Lisnaskea in County Fermanagh, Ireland. He was the eldest son of Sir Arthur Douglas Brooke, 4th Baronet, whom he succeeded as 5th Baronet when his father died in 1907. His mother was Gertrude Isabella Batson. He was a nephew of Field Marshal The 1st Viscount Alanbrooke, Chief of the Imperial General Staff during World War II, who was only five years his senior. His sister Sheelah married Sir Henry Mulholland, Speaker of the Stormont House of Commons and son of Lord Dunleath. He was educated for five years at St. George's School in Pau, France, and then at Winchester College (1901–05).

== Military and paramilitary career ==
After graduating from the Royal Military College, Sandhurst, the young Sir Basil Brooke, 5th Bt, was commissioned into the Royal Fusiliers on 26 September 1908 as a second lieutenant. He transferred to the 10th Hussars in 1911. He was awarded the Military Cross and Croix de Guerre with palm for his service during the First World War.

Brooke was a very active Ulster Unionist Party member and ally of Edward Carson. He founded his own paramilitary group, Brooke's Fermanagh Vigilance, from men returning from the war front in 1918. Although the umbrella Ulster Volunteers (UVF) had been quiescent during the war, it was not defunct. It re-emerged strongly in 1920, subsuming groups like Brooke's.

In 1920, having reached the rank of captain, Brooke left the British Army to farm the Colebrooke Estate, his family's country estate at Brookeborough in west Ulster, at which point he turned towards a career in politics.

== Political career ==
Brooke had a very long political career. When he resigned the Premiership of Northern Ireland in March 1963, he was Northern Ireland's longest-serving prime minister, having held office for two months short of 20 years. He had also established a United Kingdom record by holding government office continuously for 33 years.

In 1921 Captain Brooke was elected to the Senate of Northern Ireland, but he resigned the following year to become Commandant of the Ulster Special Constabulary (USC) in their fight against the Irish Republican Army (IRA). He was created a Commander of the Order of the British Empire in 1921.

In 1929 he was elected to the House of Commons of Northern Ireland as Ulster Unionist Party MP for the Lisnaskea division of County Fermanagh. In the words of the Oxford Dictionary of National Biography, "his thin, wiry frame, with the inevitable cigarette in hand, and clipped, anglicised accent were to be a feature of Stormont for the next forty years."

=== Cabinet minister ===
Brooke became Minister of Agriculture in 1933. By virtue of this appointment, he also acquired the rank of Privy Councillor of Northern Ireland. He was thus known, from 1933 until his elevation to the peerage in 1952, as Captain The Right Honourable Sir Basil Brooke, 5th Baronet, Commander of the Order of the British Empire, Military Cross, Privy Council of Northern Ireland, Member of Parliament. From 1941 to 1943 he was Minister of Commerce.

Capt. Brooke addressed an Orange Institution rally at Newtownbutler on 12 July 1933, where he said:

Many in this audience employ Catholics, but I have not one about my place. Catholics are out to destroy Ulster...If we in Ulster allow Roman Catholics to work on our farms we are traitors to Ulster...I would appeal to loyalists, therefore, wherever possible, to employ good Protestant lads and lassies.

In later years he expressed regret for the statement. However, on 19 March 1934 Brooke publicly repeated his feelings on the employment of Catholics – "I recommend people not to employ Roman Catholics, who are 99 per cent disloyal."

=== As Prime Minister of Northern Ireland ===
On 2 May 1943 he succeeded John M. Andrews as Prime Minister.

In 1952 Brookeborough, whilst Prime Minister, was raised to the peerage as Viscount Brookeborough, the title taken from the village named after the Brookes. Although a peer, he retained his seat in the House of Commons at Stormont and remained PM for another decade.

As the Northern Ireland economy began to de-industrialise in the mid-1950s, leading to high unemployment amongst the Protestant working classes, Brookeborough faced increasing disenchantment amongst UUP backbenchers for what was regarded as his indifferent and ineffectual approach to mounting economic problems. As this disenchantment grew, British civil servants and some members of the UUP combined to exert discreet and ultimately effective pressure on Brookeborough to resign to make way for Captain Terence O'Neill, who was Minister of Finance.

In 1959, Brooke expressed scepticism at the idea of Catholics joining the Ulster Unionist Party, saying

There is no use blinking the fact that political differences in Northern Ireland closely follow religious differences. It may not be impossible, but is certainly not easy for any person to discard the political conceptions, the influence and impressions acquired from religious and education instruction by those whose aims are openly declared to be an all-Ireland republic. The Unionist Party is dedicated to the resistance of those aims and its constitution and composition reflect that basic fact. There is no change in the fundamental character of the Unionist Party or in the loyalties it observes and preserves. If that is called intolerance I say at once it is not the fault of the Unionist party. If it is called inflexible then it shows that our principles are not elastic.

In 1963, his health having worsened, he resigned (at the age of 75) as Prime Minister. But he remained a member of the House of Commons of Northern Ireland until the 1969 general election, becoming the Father of the House in 1965. During his last years in the Parliament of Northern Ireland he publicly opposed the liberal policies of his successor Terence O'Neill, who actively sought to improve relationships with the Republic of Ireland, and who attempted to address some of the grievances of Catholics and grant many of the demands of the Northern Ireland Civil Rights Association.

Brookeborough was noted for his casual style towards his ministerial duties. Terence O'Neill later wrote of him: "he was good company and a good raconteur, and those who met him imagined that he was relaxing away from his desk. However they did not realise that there was no desk."

While Graham Walker wrote "...Brookeborough's achievements over twenty years were substantial: the Unionist Party maintained essential unity, the anti-partitionist project was thwarted, and a potentially difficult post-war relationship with Britain under Labour was managed to the long-term benefit of Northern Ireland's full participation in the welfare state and new educational opportunities...", increased educational opportunities for Catholics increased their self-confidence and expectations, which added momentum to the 1960s civil rights movement.

== Later life and death ==
In his retirement Brookeborough developed commercial interests; as chairman of Carreras (Northern Ireland), a director of Devenish Trade, and president of the Northern Ireland Institute of Directors. He was also made an honorary LLD of The Queen's University of Belfast.

From 1970 to 1973, years in which the Stormont institution came under its greatest strain and eventually crumbled, Brookeborough made only occasional forays into political life. In 1972 he appeared next to Bill Craig MP on the balcony of Parliament Buildings at Stormont, a diminutive figure beside the leader of the Ulster Vanguard who was rallying right-wing Unionists against the Government of Northern Ireland. He opposed the Westminster white paper on the future of Northern Ireland and caused some embarrassment to his son, Captain John Brooke, the UUP Chief Whip and an ally of Brian Faulkner, by speaking against the Faulkner ministry's proposals.

Lord Brookeborough died at his home, Colebrooke Park, on the Colebrooke Estate, on 18 August 1973. His remains were cremated at Roselawn Cemetery, East Belfast, three days later, and, in accordance with his wishes, his ashes were scattered on the demesne surrounding his beloved Colebrooke Park. In its obituary, The Times indirectly blamed him for the continuing Troubles: "Brookeborough was a man of courage, conviction and great charm. But his political sense was seriously found wanting by the intransigence with which he excluded the Roman Catholic minority from responsibility and participation". The obituary continued remarking that Brookeborough was "[a] staunch representative of the Anglo-Irish aristocracy and an unyielding believer in the Protestant Ascendancy...The sectarian strife now tearing at the fabric of Northern Ireland's society is in part attributable to the immobility imposed in his long period of political leadership".

Brookeborough's estate was valued at £406,591.83. His only surviving son, Captain The Right Honourable John W. Brooke, Privy Council of Northern Ireland, MP, succeeded to the viscountcy.

== Personal life and family ==
Brooke married, firstly, Cynthia Mary Surgison (1897–1970), second daughter and co-heir of Captain Charles Warden Surgison, of Cuckfield Park, Sussex. They were married on 3 June 1919 at St George's, Hanover Square. Their families were already close owing to Surgison's sister's being married to Brookeborough's cousin. Following their marriage the Brookes went to live at Colebrooke Park. They had three sons, two of whom were killed in action during the Second World War.

Brooke was a member of the Hanover Loyal Orange Lodge 1639, which served the Brookeborough estate. Involvement with the Orange Order was a longstanding family tradition.

Lady Brookeborough died in 1970 and the following year, aged 83, Lord Brookeborough married Sarah Eileen Bell Calvert, daughter of Henry Healey, of Belfast, and widow of Cecil Armstrong Calvert, FRCS, director of neurosurgery at the Royal Victoria Hospital, Belfast. Sarah Eileen, Viscountess Brookeborough, died in 1989.

In his private life, Brookeborough enjoyed farming, and he won many awards for it. He also liked shooting, fishing, golf, and dirking.

=== Children ===
By his first wife, Brookeborough had the following children:

- Lieutenant Basil Julian David Brooke (18 April 1920 – March 1943 – killed in action)
- John Warden Brooke, 2nd Viscount Brookeborough (9 November 1922 – 5 March 1987)
- Lieutenant Henry Alan Brooke (29 October 1923 – April 1945 – killed in action)

== Awards and decorations ==
Armorial achievement

He was awarded the Military Cross for "Distinguished Service in the Field" on 3 June 1916. He was awarded the Croix de Guerre in 1918.

Having been appointed CBE in 1921, Brooke was, on 1 July 1952, raised to the House of Lords as Viscount Brookeborough, of Colebrooke, County Fermanagh. He was appointed a Knight Companion of the Garter in 1965. He held the office of Vice-Admiral of Ulster between 1961 and 1973. He held the office of Lord Lieutenant of County Fermanagh and was Custos Rotulorum of County Fermanagh between 1963 and 1969.

Ribbon	Award	Date	Post-nominal letters
	Order of the British Empire	1921	CBE
	Military Cross	1916	MC
	Order of the Garter	1965	KG
	Croix de Guerre	1918	

== See also ==
- List of Northern Ireland Members of the House of Lords

Political offices
Preceded by Henry Mulholland	Assistant Parliamentary Secretary to the Ministry of Finance; 1929–1933	Succeeded by Sir Wilson Hungerford
Preceded by Edward Mervyn Archdale	Minister of Agriculture; 1933–1941	Succeeded by Lord Glentoran
Preceded by John Milne Barbour	Minister of Commerce; 1941–1943	Succeeded by Himself as Minister of Commerce and Production
Preceded by Himself as Minister of Commerce	Minister of Commerce and Production; 1943–1945	Succeeded by Roland Thomas Nugent
Preceded by J. M. Andrews	Prime Minister of Northern Ireland; 1943–1963	Succeeded by Terence O'Neill
Parliament of Northern Ireland
New constituency	Member of Parliament for Lisnaskea; 1929–1968	Succeeded by John Brooke
Party political offices
Preceded by Henry Mulholland	Unionist Assistant Whip; 1929–1933	Succeeded by Sir Wilson Hungerford
Preceded by J. M. Andrews	Leader of the Unionist Party; 1946–1963	Succeeded by Terence O'Neill
Honorary titles
Preceded by The Earl of Enniskillen	Lord Lieutenant of Fermanagh; 1963–1969	Vacant Title next held by Thomas Patrick David Scott
Preceded by Cahir Healy	Father of the House; 1965–1968	Succeeded by Sir Norman Stronge
Baronetage of the United Kingdom
Preceded by Arthur Brooke	Baronet of Colebrooke; 1907–1973	Succeeded by John Brooke
Peerage of the United Kingdom
New creation	Viscount Brookeborough; 1952–1973	Succeeded by John Brooke
