= Brookeborough =

Village in County Fermanagh, Northern Ireland

Coordinates: 54.315°N 7.406°W

Brookeborough: Irish: Achadh Lon
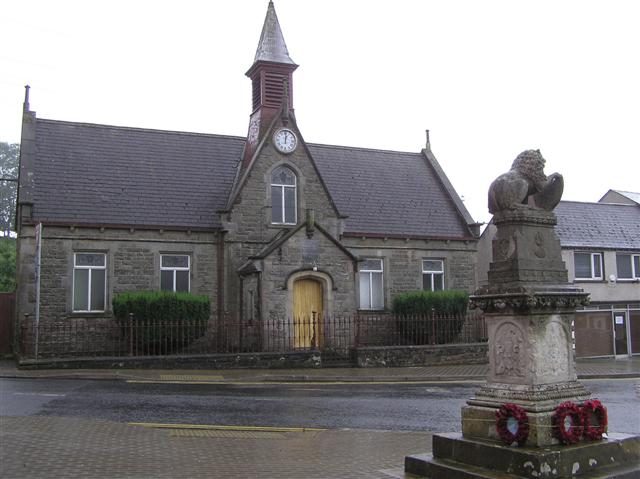
- Lady Brooke Memorial Hall, Brookeborough

- Location within Northern Ireland
- Population: 438 (2021 census)
- Irish grid reference: H380410
  - Belfast: 69 miles (111 km)
- District: Fermanagh and Omagh
- County: County Fermanagh
- Country: Northern Ireland
- Sovereign state: United Kingdom
- Post town: Enniskillen
- Postcode district: BT94
- Dialling code: 028
- UK Parliament: Fermanagh and South Tyrone
- NI Assembly: Fermanagh and South Tyrone

Brookeborough (/brʊkˈbʌrə/; Irish: Achadh Lon, meaning 'Field of the Blackbirds') is a village in County Fermanagh, Northern Ireland, at the westerly foot of Slieve Beagh. It lies about eleven miles east of Enniskillen, just off the A4 trunk road, and about five miles west of the County Tyrone boundary. It is situated in the civil parish of Aghavea and the historic barony of Magherastephana. It is situated within Fermanagh and Omagh district.

According to the 2021 census, Brookeborough had a population of 438. The economy is heavily dependent on cattle and sheep farming. There are five places of Christian worship; a Catholic church, a Methodist church (built in 1839), an Elim Pentecostal church, a Church of Ireland church and a Baptist church; two public houses; and two primary (elementary) schools.

== History ==
Before the Plantation of Ulster the area of Brookeborough was known as Achadh Lon (anglicised as Aghalun), the townland in which it lies. It is believed that the Irish name refers to a "field of blackbirds". Aghalun was in the hands of the Maguire Clan until the 1641 rebellion when it was given to the Brooke family. The village was then named after Sir Henry Brooke, who was granted the village in 1666 and settled at Colebrooke Park nearby.

On 1 January 1957 at 6.55pm, members of an Irish Republican Army (IRA) column led by Seán Garland, equipped with grenades and firebombs, launched an attack on Brookesborough Royal Ulster Constabulary (RUC) barracks as part of the ongoing Border Campaign. Two IRA members, Seán South and Fergal O'Hanlon, were killed in a battle that lasted 'ten minutes', with three of their comrades wounded.

In 2002, the Brookeborough Community Development Association, in conjunction with a similar organisation in Riverstown, County Sligo, Republic of Ireland, launched the Riverbrooke Cross-Border Initiative linking the two villages in a programme of cross-community/cross-border working.

== Places of interest ==
- Colebrooke House is a B+ listed Neoclassical country house, built in 1820, and situated in an estate of 1,000 acres. Colebrooke Park was recently renovated and refurbished by the present Viscount Brookeborough and his wife, Viscountess Brookeborough. This renovation of Colebrooke included the installation of the new Colebrooke spa, which was featured on the television show Country House Rescue in June 2012. The Colebrooke Spa closed after operating for ten years. Part of this renovation also includes additional accommodation in the form of The Triumphal Arch Lodge. Today Colebrooke Park, and the buildings around it, provide a tranquil getaway from the rush of the main A4 road between Brookeborough and Fivemiletown, which eventually becomes a section of motorway between Ballygawley and Dungannon, on the way to Belfast. This homely and historic rural retreat has also featured in a number of programmes and publications on the culture of Northern Ireland, and also includes holiday cottages and The Ashbrooke Riding School. Equestrianism has long been a part of the history of this area.
- Memorial to Seán South and Fergal O'Hanlon at Altawalk Cross.
- Brookeborough Railway Station House (Formerly on the Clogher Valley railway which ran through the village from May 1887 to January 1942) – This small redbrick building now hosts a playgroup and community centre, and pays homage to its railway tradition through the artwork of Amanda Montgomery, who produced a specially commissioned piece of artwork based around themes of travel and railway history. Also in 1998 President Mary McAleese visited the station house as part of a celebration of its opening and as a testament to the cross community work taking place in the area at this time.
- Brookeborough Heber McMahons GAA grounds and complex – Located on the Carrickaheenan Road this facility includes two football pitches, changing rooms, and clubhouse.
- Aghavea Parish Church

== Transport ==
The Clogher Valley Railway, ran through the village from 1887 (Brookeborough station opened on 2 May 1887) until its closure on 1 January 1942. Its route started in Maguiresbridge, passing through Brookebrough, Fivemiletown, Clogher, Augher, Ballygawley, Aughnacloy before eventually terminating at Tynan near Caledon.

The main road to Belfast bypassed the village in the mid-1960s.

== Demographics ==
As of the 2001 census, Brookeborough was classified as a small village or hamlet by the Northern Ireland Statistics and Research Agency (NISRA) (i.e. with a population of between 500 and 1,000 people). On census day 29 April 2001, there were 517 people living in Brookeborough. Of these:

- 25.5% were aged under 16 years
- 16.8% were aged 60 and over
- the average age was 34.7 years (NI average age 35.8 years)
- 50.3% of the population were male and 49.7% were female
- 50.2% were from a Catholic community background
- 48.1% were from a Protestant and other Christian
- 8.2% were born outside Northern Ireland

== Sport ==
In his youth Roy Carroll, the Northern Ireland international goalkeeper, played for the Brookeborough football team.

The local Gaelic Athletic Association team is known as Brookeborough Heber MacMahon's Gaelic Football Club. It is named after Dr. Heber MacMahon (1600–1650), Bishop of Clogher, a Catholic prelate who was executed during the Irish Confederate Wars. The team has never won honours at Senior Championship level but has won a number of Junior, Under-age and Intermediate Level competitions.

== Notable people ==
- John Armstrong – American Congressman and revolutionary
- Field Marshal The 1st Viscount Alanbrooke – soldier and Chief of the Imperial General Staff (CIGS) during most of the Second World War
- The 1st Viscount Brookeborough – Prime Minister of Northern Ireland from 1943 until 1963
- The 2nd Viscount Brookeborough – son of the 1st Viscount; he served, when he was Captain John Brooke, as a junior Government minister in the old Stormont regime in the early 1970s.
- Sir Victor Brooke, 3rd Baronet – landlord and naturalist
- The Baroness Foster of Aghadrumsee – former First Minister of Northern Ireland. Raised in Aghadrumsee and, later, in Lisnaskea, her principal residence is now on the outskirts of Brookeborough.
- Bobbie Hanvey – Photographer & Radio Broadcaster
- Jeremiah Jordan – Irish Nationalist MP
- Charitie Lees Smith – Hymn writer
- Sir Evelyn Wrench – Editor of The Spectator, 1925–1932. Also founded the Royal Over-Seas League in 1910.

== See also ==
- List of towns and villages in Northern Ireland
- List of towns and villages in Northern Ireland
- Market houses in Northern Ireland
