= List of members of the 3rd House of Commons of Northern Ireland =

This is a list of the members of Parliament elected in the 1929 Northern Ireland general election. Elections to the 3rd Northern Ireland House of Commons were held on 22 May 1929.

All members of the Northern Ireland House of Commons elected at the 1929 Northern Ireland general election are listed.

Sir James Craig, (created Viscount Craigavon following the election) continued as Prime Minister.

== Members ==
Name	Constituency	Party
J. M. Andrews	Mid Down	UUP
Edward Archdale	Enniskillen	UUP
Anthony Babington	Belfast Cromac	UUP
John Milne Barbour	South Antrim	UUP
Dawson Bates	Belfast Victoria	UUP
Jack Beattie	Belfast Pottinger	NI Labour
Arthur Black	Belfast Willowfield	UUP
Charles Blakiston-Houston	Belfast Dock	UUP
Basil Brooke	Lisnaskea	UUP
Richard Byrne	Belfast Falls	Nationalist
James Chichester-Clark	South Londonderry	UUP
John Henry Collins	South Down	Nationalist
Joe Connellan	South Armagh	Nationalist
Robert Corkey	Queen's University of Belfast	UUP
James Craig	North Down	UUP
Robert Crawford	Mid Antrim	UUP
John Clarke Davison	Mid Armagh	UUP
Joe Devlin	Belfast Central	Nationalist
Herbert Dixon	Belfast Bloomfield	UUP
Alexander Donnelly	West Tyrone	Nationalist
Rowley Elliott	South Tyrone	UUP
Alexander Gordon	East Down	UUP
John Fawcett Gordon	Carrick	UUP
William Grant	Belfast Duncairn	UUP
Samuel Hall-Thompson	Belfast Clifton	UUP
George Hanna	Larne	UUP
Cahir Healy	South Fermanagh	Nationalist
Tommy Henderson	Belfast Shankill	Ind. Unionist
Alexander Hungerford	Belfast Oldpark	UUP
John Johnston	North Armagh	UUP
Robert James Johnstone	Queen's University of Belfast	UUP
George Leeke	Mid Londonderry	Nationalist
Robert Lynn	North Antrim	UUP
John Martin Mark	North Londonderry	UUP
Hugh McAleer	Mid Tyrone	Nationalist
Robert McBride	West Down	UUP
James Joseph McCarroll	Foyle	Nationalist
James Hanna McCormick	Belfast St Annes	UUP
Robert Norman McNeill	Queen's University of Belfast	Ind. Unionist
William Thomas Miller	North Tyrone	UUP
Hugh Minford	Antrim	UUP
Thomas Moles	Belfast Ballynafeigh	UUP
Henry Mulholland	Ards	UUP
Edward Sullivan Murphy	City of Londonderry	UUP
John William Nixon	Belfast Woodvale	Ind. Unionist
Patrick O'Neill	Mourne	Nationalist
Hugh Pollock	Belfast Windsor	UUP
John Hanna Robb	Queen's University of Belfast	UUP
David Shillington	Central Armagh	UUP
Joe Stewart	East Tyrone	Nationalist
Margaret Alicia Waring	Iveagh	UUP
George Charles Gillespie Young	Bannside	UUP

== Changes ==
10 November 1930: James Fulton Gamble elected for the Unionists in North Tyrone, following the death of William Thomas Miller.
31 January 1933: Death of James Lenox-Conyngham Chichester-Clark. This vacancy remained unfilled at the time of the next general election.
