= List of members of the 2nd House of Commons of Northern Ireland =

This is a list of members of Parliament elected in the 1925 Northern Ireland general election. Elections to the 2nd Northern Ireland House of Commons were held on 3 April 1925.

All members of the Northern Ireland House of Commons elected at the 1925 Northern Ireland general election are listed.

Sir James Craig, (later Viscount Craigavon) continued as Prime Minister following the election. The second place Nationalist Party ended its policy of abstentionism and took their seats but refused to accept the role of Official Opposition.

== Members ==
Name	Constituency	Party
Robert Anderson	Londonderry	UUP
J. M. Andrews	Down	UUP
Edward Archdale	Fermanagh and Tyrone	UUP
John Milne Barbour	Antrim	UUP
Richard Dawson Bates	Belfast East	UUP
Jack Beattie	Belfast East	NI Labour
Richard Best	Armagh	UUP
Arthur Black	Belfast South	UUP
Sir John Campbell	Queens University of Belfast	UUP
Lloyd Campbell	Belfast North	UUP
Dehra Chichester	Londonderry	UUP
John Henry Collins	Armagh	Nationalist
James Cooper	Fermanagh and Tyrone	UUP
James Craig	Down	UUP
Robert Crawford	Antrim	UUP
Joe Devlin	Belfast West	Nationalist
Herbert Dixon	Belfast East	UUP
Alex Donnelly	Fermanagh and Tyrone	Nationalist
Eamon Donnelly	Armagh	Republican
Rowley Elliott	Fermanagh and Tyrone	UUP
John Fawcett Gordon	Antrim	UUP
William Grant	Belfast North	UUP
James Woods Gyle	Belfast East	Ind. Unionist
George Hanna	Antrim	UUP
Thomas Harbison	Fermanagh and Tyrone	Nationalist
Cahir Healy	Fermanagh and Tyrone	Nationalist
George Henderson	Antrim	Unbought Tenants
Tommy Henderson	Belfast North	Ind. Unionist
Robert Johnstone	Queens University of Belfast	UUP
Sam Kyle	Belfast North	NI Labour
Thomas Lavery	Down	UUP
George Leeke	Londonderry	Nationalist
Robert Lynn	Belfast West	UUP
Thomas Stanislaus McAllister	Antrim	Nationalist
Robert McBride	Down	UUP
Basil McGuckin	Londonderry	Nationalist
John McHugh	Fermanagh and Tyrone	Nationalist
Thomas McMullan	Down	UUP
William McMullen	Belfast West	NI Labour
John Martin Mark	Londonderry	UUP
William Miller	Fermanagh and Tyrone	UUP
Thomas Moles	Belfast South	UUP
Hugh Morrison	Queens University of Belfast	UUP
Harry Mulholland	Down	UUP
Patrick O'Neill	Down	Nationalist
Robert William O'Neill	Antrim	UUP
Hugh Pollock	Belfast South	UUP
John Hanna Robb	Queens University of Belfast	UUP
David Shillington	Armagh	UUP
Éamon de Valera	Down	Republican
Philip James Woods ^{1}	Belfast South	Ind. Unionist
Philip James Woods ^{1}	Belfast West	Ind. Unionist

== Changes ==
- ^1 Philip James Woods (Independent Unionist) was elected in both the Belfast West and Belfast South constituencies. He declined the Belfast South seat resulting in a by-election held on 6 November 1925, which was won by Anthony Brutus Babington (UUP).
