= List of members of the 4th House of Commons of Northern Ireland =

This is a list of members of Parliament elected in the 1933 Northern Ireland general election. Elections to the 4th Northern Ireland House of Commons were held on 30 November 1933.

All members of the Northern Ireland House of Commons elected at the 1933 Northern Ireland general election are listed.

== Members ==
Name	Constituency	Party
J. M. Andrews	Mid Down	UUP
Sir Edward Archdale	Enniskillen	UUP
Anthony Babington	Belfast Cromac	UUP
John Milne Barbour	South Antrim	UUP
Dawson Bates	Belfast Victoria	UUP
Jack Beattie	Belfast Pottinger	NI Labour
Arthur Black	Belfast Willowfield	UUP
Basil Brooke	Lisnaskea	UUP
Richard Byrne	Belfast Falls	Nationalist
Daniel Hall Christie	North Londonderry	UUP
Robert Corkey	Queen's University of Belfast	UUP
James Craig	North Down	UUP
Robert Crawford	Mid Antrim	UUP
John Clarke Davison	Mid Armagh	UUP
Joseph Devlin	Belfast Central	Nationalist
Herbert Dixon	Belfast Bloomfield	UUP
Alexander Donnelly	West Tyrone	Nationalist
Rowley Elliott	South Tyrone	UUP
Samuel Fryar	West Down	UUP
James Fulton Gamble	North Tyrone	UUP
Alexander Gordon	East Down	UUP
John Fawcett Gordon	Carrick	UUP
William Grant	Belfast Duncairn	UUP
Samuel Hall-Thompson	Belfast Clifton	UUP
George Hanna	Larne	UUP
Cahir Healy	South Fermanagh	Nationalist
Tommy Henderson	Belfast Shankill	Ind. Unionist
Alexander Hungerford	Belfast Oldpark	UUP
John Johnston	North Armagh	UUP
Robert James Johnstone	Queen's University of Belfast	UUP
George Leeke	Mid Londonderry	Nationalist
Robert Lynn	North Antrim	UUP
Hugh McAleer	Mid Tyrone	Nationalist
James Joseph McCarroll	Foyle	Nationalist
James Hanna McCormick	Belfast St Annes	UUP
Paddy McLogan	South Armagh	Ind. Republican
Robert McNeill	Queen's University of Belfast	Ind. Unionist
Harry Midgley	Belfast Dock	NI Labour
Hugh Minford	Antrim	UUP
Thomas Moles	Belfast Ballynafeigh	UUP
Henry Mulholland	Ards	UUP
Edward Sullivan Murphy	City of Londonderry	UUP
John William Nixon	Belfast Woodvale	Ind. Unionist
Patrick O'Neill	Mourne	Nationalist
Dehra Parker	South Londonderry	UUP
Hugh Pollock	Belfast Windsor	UUP
John Hanna Robb	Queen's University of Belfast	UUP
David Shillington	Central Armagh	UUP
Joe Stewart	East Tyrone	Nationalist
Éamon de Valera	South Down	Fianna Fáil
John Charles Wilson	Iveagh	UUP
George Charles Gillespie Young	Bannside	UUP

== Changes ==
- 1933: Robert McNeill began taking the Unionist whip.
- 1934: Jack Beattie expelled from the Northern Ireland Labour Party, and sat as an independent Labour member.
- 4 June 1934: Thomas Joseph Campbell elected for the Nationalists in Belfast Central, following the death of Joseph Devlin.
- 22 March 1935: Arthur Brownlow Mitchell elected for the Unionists in Queen's University of Belfast, following the resignation of Robert McNeill.
- 2 April 1937: Frederick Thompson elected for the Unionists in Belfast Ballynafeigh, following the death of Thomas Moles.
- 7 May 1937: Patrick Maxwell elected for the Nationalists in Foyle, following the death of James Joseph McCarroll.
- 27 May 1937: Harold Claude Robinson elected for the Unionists in Larne, following the resignation of George Hanna.
- 2 February 1938: Death of Patrick O'Neill. His seat remained unfilled at the time of the general election.
