= John McHugh (Irish politician) =

Irish politician (fl. 1898–1945)

John McHugh (fl. 1898–1945) was an Irish nationalist politician.

McHugh worked as a farmer. In 1898, he was elected to Fermanagh County Council, serving until 1922. By the end of this period, he was the Chairman of the council. He was elected for the Nationalist Party in Fermanagh and Tyrone at the 1925 Northern Ireland general election, taking his seat in November 1927, but standing down at the 1929 general election. That same year, he was elected to the Senate of Northern Ireland and served until 1945.

Parliament of Northern Ireland
Preceded by Arthur Griffith; Edward Archdale; William Coote; Seán Milroy; William Thomas Miller; James Cooper; Seán O'Μahony; Thomas Harbison	Member of Parliament for Fermanagh and Tyrone; 1925–1929; With: Edward Archdale; Rowley Elliott; William Thomas Miller; Cahir Healy; Thomas Harbison; James Cooper; Alex Donnelly	Constituency divided
