= South Tyrone (Northern Ireland Parliament constituency) =

Coordinates: 54.440°N 7.129°W

- Former County constituency for the Parliament of Northern Ireland
- South Tyrone shown within Northern Ireland

Former constituency
- Created: 1929
- Abolished: 1973
- Election method: First past the post

South Tyrone was a constituency of the Parliament of Northern Ireland.

== Boundaries ==
South Tyrone was a county constituency comprising the central part of County Tyrone. It was created when the House of Commons (Method of Voting and Redistribution of Seats) Act (Northern Ireland) 1929 introduced first-past-the-post elections throughout Northern Ireland. South Tyrone was created by the division of Fermanagh and Tyrone into eight new constituencies, of which five were in County Tyrone. The constituency survived unchanged, returning one member of Parliament, until the Parliament of Northern Ireland was temporarily suspended in 1972 and then formally abolished in 1973.

The seat was made up from parts of the rural districts of Clogher and Dungannon as well as the town of Dungannon.

== Politics ==
County Tyrone had five Stormont MPs from 1929 until 1972. The seats in the North and South of the county were Unionist, the constituency covering the East could be considered marginal, whilst those in the West and centre of the county were nationalist.

South Tyrone was contested by the Nationalist Party once, in 1949. All other contests were triggered by either an independent unionist or member of the Northern Ireland Labour Party standing against the Ulster Unionist Party, which consistently held the seat.

MPs for the area included Stormont's last Minister of State for Home Affairs, John Taylor, and William Frederick McCoy who served briefly as Speaker to the House of Commons of Northern Ireland from 25 January 1956 until 23 April 1956.

== Members of Parliament ==
Year	Member	Party
1929	Rowley Elliott	UUP
1944	William Frederick McCoy	UUP
1965	John Taylor	UUP

== Election results ==
General Election 1929: South Tyrone
Party	Candidate	Votes	%	±%
UUP	Rowley Elliott	8,743	65.0	
Ind. Unionist	J. J. Hazlett	4,699	35.0	
Majority		4,044	30.0	
Turnout		17,486	74.2	
UUP win (new seat)				

At the 1933 Northern Ireland general election, Rowley Elliott was elected unopposed.

General Election 1938: South Tyrone
Party	Candidate	Votes	%	±%
UUP	Rowley Elliott	9,478	71.6	N/A
NI Labour	A. Graham	3,754	28.4	New
Majority		5,724	43.2	N/A
Turnout		13,232	75.0	N/A
UUP hold		Swing	N/A	

South Tyrone by-election, 1945
Party	Candidate	Votes	%	±%
UUP	William Frederick McCoy	6,352	81.9	+10.3
NI Labour	William Leeburn	1,400	18.1	−10.3
Majority		4,952	63.8	+20.6
Turnout		7,752	44.8	−30.2
UUP hold		Swing		

At the 1945 Northern Ireland general election, William Frederick McCoy was elected unopposed.

General Election 1949: South Tyrone
Party	Candidate	Votes	%	±%
UUP	William Frederick McCoy	8,855	61.1	N/A
Nationalist	James Slevin	5,630	38.9	New
Majority		3,225	22.2	N/A
Turnout		14,485	84.3	N/A
UUP hold		Swing	N/A	

At the 1953, 1958 and 1962 Northern Ireland general elections, William Frederick McCoy was elected unopposed.

General Election 1965: South Tyrone
Party	Candidate	Votes	%	±%
UUP	John Taylor	8,935	64.8	N/A
NI Labour	Jack Hassard	4,862	35.2	New
Majority		4,073	29.6	N/A
Turnout		13,797	77.5	N/A
UUP hold		Swing	N/A	

General Election 1969: South Tyrone
Party	Candidate	Votes	%	±%
UUP	John Taylor	7,683	54.0	−10.8
Ind. Unionist	Thomas Gerard Eakins	6,533	46.0	New
Majority		1,150	8.0	−21.6
Turnout		14,216	83.0	+5.5
UUP hold		Swing		
