= North Armagh =

North Armagh may refer to:

- The northern part of County Armagh
- North Armagh (Northern Ireland Parliament constituency)
- North Armagh (UK Parliament constituency)
