= James Pringle (Northern Ireland politician) =

Northern Irish politician (1874–1935)

James Alexander Pringle KC (18 August 1874 – 7 July 1935) was a barrister and Unionist politician in Northern Ireland.

James Pringle was the son of Henry Pringle, of Clonbay House, Clones, Co. Monaghan, Ireland. He was admitted, firstly as a solicitor in 1900, and was then called to the Bar of Ireland at King's Inns, Dublin twelve years later. After just nine years, in 1921, he was called to the Inner Bar - becoming King's Counsel (K.C.); traditionally, one must be a member of the utter bar for ten years.

Pringle stood for the UK Parliament in Fermanagh and Tyrone in the 1922 and 1923 general elections, on each occasion being narrowly defeated by two Nationalist Party members. In 1924, the Nationalists stood aside, and Pringle was elected alongside fellow Ulster Unionist Party member Charles Falls, easily beating two Sinn Féin members. Pringle did not stand in 1929, when two Nationalist Party members gained the constituency unopposed. A Presbyterian, Pringle was a cousin of Victoria Cross winning doctor John Alexander Sinton.

At the 1929 Northern Ireland general election, Pringle stood as a Local Option candidate in Larne, but was not elected.

Pringle lived at Cranmore Park, Malone Road, Belfast. His son, Prof. John Seton Pringle, became a Fellow of the Royal College of Surgeons and married Nancy Chaloner (a descendant of John Cole, 1st Baron Mountflorence, Sir William Montgomery, 1st Baronet, John Beresford and Marcus Beresford, 1st Earl of Tyrone).

Parliament of the United Kingdom
Preceded by Thomas Harbison and Cahir Healy	Member of Parliament for Fermanagh & Tyrone; 1924–1929; With: Charles Falls	Succeeded by Joseph Devlin and Thomas Harbison
