= South Tyrone =

South Tyrone may refer to:

- The southern part of County Tyrone
- South Tyrone (Northern Ireland Parliament constituency)
- South Tyrone (UK Parliament constituency)
