= North Tyrone =

North Tyrone may refer to:

- The northern part of County Tyrone
- North Tyrone (Northern Ireland Parliament constituency)
- North Tyrone (UK Parliament constituency)
