= James Cooper (Northern Ireland politician) =

Northern Ireland Unionist politician and solicitor (1882–1949)

James Cooper (26 February 1882 – 21 July 1949) was a Northern Ireland Unionist politician and solicitor.

He was educated at Portora Royal School and Wesley College, Dublin. He was the chairman of Fermanagh County Council from 1924 to 1928. He was elected to the House of Commons of Northern Ireland as an Ulster Unionist Party member for Fermanagh and Tyrone at the 1921 general election and was re-elected at the 1925 general election. He retired at the 1929 general election.

Parliament of Northern Ireland
New parliament	Member of Parliament for Fermanagh and Tyrone; 1921–1929; With: Arthur Griffith 1921–1922; William Coote 1921–1924; Seán Milroy 1921–1925; Edward Archdale 1921–1929; William Thomas Miller 1921–1929; Seán O'Mahony 1921–1925; Thomas Harbison 1921–1929; Alex Donnelly 1925–1929; Rowley Elliott 1925–1929; Cahir Healy 1925–1929; John McHugh 1925–1929	Constituency divided
