= Fermanagh and Tyrone =

Fermanagh and Tyrone can refer to:

- Fermanagh and Tyrone (Northern Ireland Parliament constituency)
- Fermanagh and Tyrone (UK Parliament constituency)
