= Seán O'Mahony =

Irish politician (1872–1934)

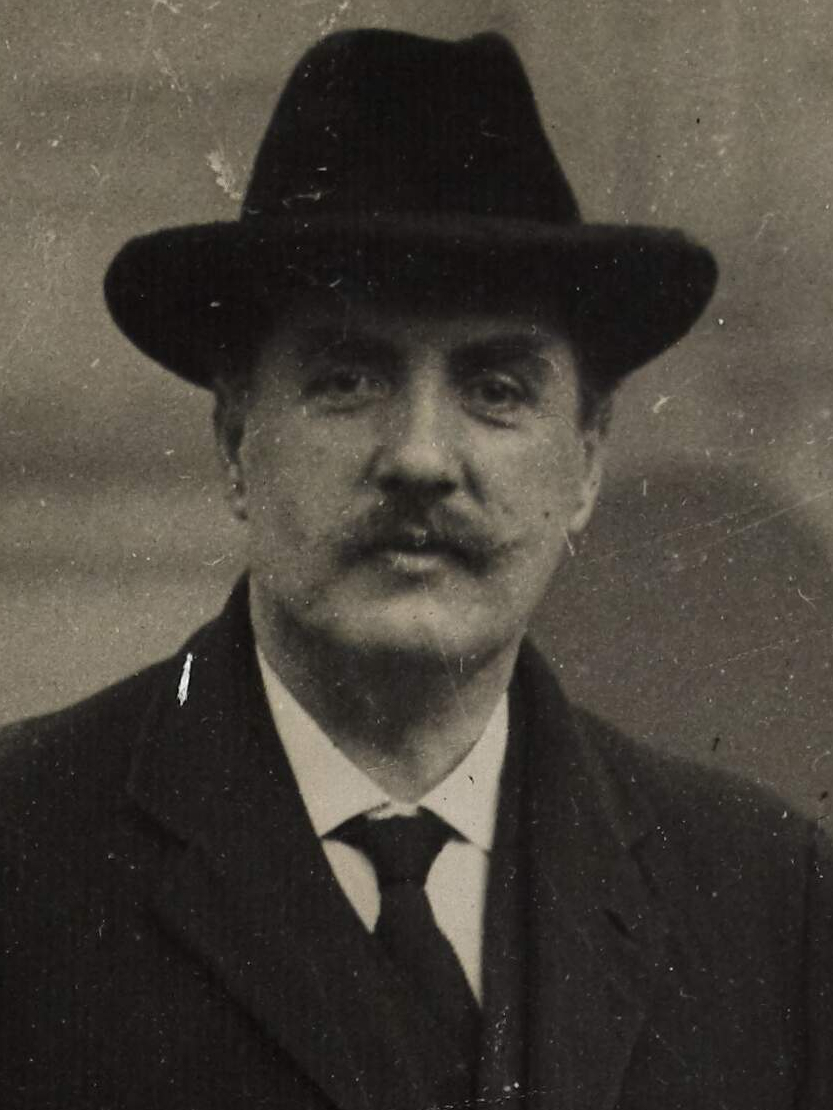
- O'Mahoney, c. 1921

Member of the Northern Ireland Parliament
- In office May 1921 – April 1925
- Constituency: Fermanagh and Tyrone

Teachta Dála
- In office December 1918 – May 1921
- Constituency: Fermanagh South

Personal details
- Born: John Mahony; 20 October 1872 Thomastown, County Kilkenny, Ireland
- Died: 28 November 1934 (aged 62) Dublin, Ireland
- Resting place: Glasnevin Cemetery, Dublin
- Party: Sinn Féin
- Children: 2

Military service
- Branch/service: Irish Volunteers
- Battles/wars: Easter Rising

Seán O'Mahony (also John O'Mahoney) (20 October 1872 – 28 November 1934) was an Irish Sinn Féin politician and member of the First and Second Dáil.

He was born as John Mahony in Logan Street, Thomastown, County Kilkenny, to James Mahony, a tailor, and Mary Cantwell. A successful businessman he was a tea merchant and a commercial traveller. His company, John O'Mahoney & Co., was located on Middle Abbey Street, and was destroyed during the 1916 Easter Rising. It subsequently reestablished on Parnell Square. He subsequently purchased and ran Fleming's Hotel which was located at 31–32 Gardiner Place, Dublin. A close friend of Arthur Griffith, he became an organiser for Sinn Féin and was elected to Dublin Corporation for the party.

He participated in the Easter Rising and was subsequently interned at Frongoch and Lincoln Gaol. He remained with Sinn Féin after it was re-constituted as a republican party at the 1917 Ardfheis.

He was arrested during the German Plot of 1917 and was imprisoned in Lincoln Gaol. While imprisoned he was elected as a Sinn Féin MP for Fermanagh South in the 1918 general election. He was released from prison in 1919 and attended the proceedings of the First Dáil. He was re-arrested at the Sinn Féin offices in November 1919 and was imprisoned for three months in England. He would be arrested several more times throughout the Anglo-Irish War and his hotel was used as a meeting place by Sinn Féin members throughout the time.

He was elected in the 1921 general election to the Second Dáil for Fermanagh and Tyrone. As a result of the Government of Ireland Act 1920 this election was to provide the membership of two assemblies: the Southern Ireland House of Commons and the Northern Ireland House of Commons. The eight seat Fermanagh-Tyrone constituency was one of several in the Northern Ireland House of Commons. As members of Sinn Féin did not recognise either assembly he and the other five Sinn Féin TDs continued to attend the Dáil. Significantly, this represented six nationalists elected from Fermanagh and Tyrone; five in the Sinn Féin interest and Harbison as a Nationalist to two Unionists. During the debates on the Anglo-Irish Treaty he opposed ratification of the document and voted against ratification. He left the Dáil with Éamon de Valera and the other Anti-Treaty TDs.

As the only member of the Second Dáil not elected to the Southern Ireland House of Commons, his status in the 3rd Dáil in 1922 was unclear. O'Mahony was not invited to attend the opening of the Provisional Parliament. De Valera was keen for him to attend since if he had been refused entry it would have demonstrated, in the minds of Anti-Treaty supporters, that the assembly was not an All-Ireland Dáil. In the end O'Mahony did not attend, but his case was taken up by Laurence Ginnell. This was to demonstrate de jure existence of the Second Dáil as a representative for Fermanagh was unable to attend the assembly, the point made by Ginnell and argued in theoretical republican ideology. O'Mahony remained an abstentionist MP to Stormont until the 1925 Northern Ireland general election, which he did not contest.

Remaining with Sinn Féin after the 1926 split he served on the party's Ard Chomairle until his death.

He died in 1934. His funeral was attended by representatives of Sinn Féin, the Irish Republican Army, Fianna Fáil, Fianna Éireann, Cumann na mBan, and Mná na Poblachta. He is buried in Glasnevin Cemetery.

He was survived by his wife, and a son, Malachy, and a daughter, Máire.

== Sources ==
- Dorothy Macardle, (1937), The Irish Republic.
- Frank Gallagher, The Four Glorious Years, 2005 edition.
- Biography from Northern Ireland Parliamentary Election Results
- Irish Independent, 29 & 30 November, 1 December 1934.

Parliament of the United Kingdom
Preceded by Patrick Crumley	Member of Parliament for Fermanagh South; 1918–1922	Constituency abolished
Parliament of Northern Ireland
New parliament	Member of Parliament for Fermanagh and Tyrone; 1921–1925; With: Arthur Griffith 1921–1922; Edward Archdale 1921–1929; William Coote 1921–1924; Seán Milroy 1921–1925; William Thomas Miller 1921–1929; James Cooper 1921–1929; Thomas Harbison 1921–1929	Succeeded by Alexander Donnelly 1925–1929; Edward Archdale 1921–1929; Rowley Elliott 1925–1929; William Thomas Miller 1921–1929; Cahir Healy 1925–1929; Thomas Harbison 1921–1929; James Cooper 1921–1929; John McHugh 1925–1929
