= Fermanagh and Tyrone (Northern Ireland Parliament constituency) =

Coordinates: 54.579°N 7.197°W

- Former County constituency for the Parliament of Northern Ireland
- Fermanagh and Tyrone shown within Northern Ireland

Former constituency
- Created: 1921
- Abolished: 1929
- Election method: Single transferable vote

Fermanagh and Tyrone was a county constituency of the Parliament of Northern Ireland from 1921 to 1929. It returned eight MPs, using proportional representation by means of the single transferable vote.

== Boundaries ==
Fermanagh and Tyrone was created by the Government of Ireland Act 1920 and consisted of the entirety of County Fermanagh and County Tyrone. The House of Commons (Method of Voting and Redistribution of Seats) Act (Northern Ireland) 1929 divided the constituency into eight constituencies elected under first past the post: East Tyrone, Enniskillen, Lisnaskea, Mid Tyrone, North Tyrone, South Fermanagh, South Tyrone and West Tyrone.

== Second Dáil ==
In May 1921, Dáil Éireann, the parliament of the self-declared Irish Republic run by Sinn Féin, passed a resolution declaring that elections to the House of Commons of Northern Ireland and the House of Commons of Southern Ireland would be used as the election for the Second Dáil. All those elected were on the roll of the Second Dáil, but only three of the 8 MPs elected for Fermanagh and Tyrone also sat as TDs in Dáil Éireann: Arthur Griffith and Seán Milroy, both of whom were also elected for Clare, and Seán O'Mahony. O'Mahony was the only Sinn Féin TD in the Second Dáil who represented only a constituency in Northern Ireland.

== Politics ==
Fermanagh and Tyrone had a slight Nationalist majority, but this was fairly evenly balanced with a Unionist minority. In both elections, four Unionists were elected, alongside three Sinn Féin members and one Nationalist in 1921, and four Nationalists in 1925.

== Members of Parliament ==
Election	Member (Party)	Member (Party)	Member (Party)	Member (Party)	Member (Party)	Member (Party)	Member (Party)	Member (Party)
MPs (1921)	Arthur Griffith (Sinn Féin)	Edward Archdale (Ulster Unionist)	William Coote (Ulster Unionist)	William Thomas Miller (Ulster Unionist)	James Cooper (Ulster Unionist)	Thomas Harbison (Nationalist Party)	Seán O'Mahony (Sinn Féin)	Seán Milroy (Sinn Féin)
MPs (1925)	Alexander Donnelly (Nationalist Party)	Edward Archdale (Ulster Unionist)	Rowley Elliott (Ulster Unionist)	William Thomas Miller (Ulster Unionist)	James Cooper (Ulster Unionist)	Thomas Harbison (Nationalist Party)	Cahir Healy (Nationalist Party)	John McHugh (Nationalist Party)

== Election results ==
1921 General Election: Fermanagh and Tyrone (8 seats)
Party	Candidate	FPv%	Count									
Party	Candidate	FPv%	1	2	3	4	5	6	7	8	9	10
Sinn Féin	Arthur Griffith	25.9	21,677									
UUP	Edward Archdale	12.3	10,336									
UUP	William Coote	11.5	9,672									
UUP	William Thomas Miller	10.9	9,165	9,343								
UUP	James Cooper	10.5	8,754	8,762	9,789							
Nationalist	Thomas Harbison	8.5	7,090	7,754	7,754	7,771	7,806	7,807	7,814	7,886	7,992	9,444
Nationalist	J. P. Gillin	6.7	5,591	5,782	5,784	5,824	5,832	5,832	5,842	5,867	6,115	8,109
Sinn Féin	Seán O'Mahony	5.9	4,979	5,211	5,211	5,215	7,085	7,118	7,119	7,975	12,752	
Sinn Féin	Kevin Roantree O'Shiel	5.3	4,464	4,994	4,995	5,004	5,236	5,238	5,239	5,330		
Sinn Féin	Seán Milroy	2.2	1,846	11,556								
Sinn Féin	Seán MacEntee	0.2	179	1,037	1,037	1,065	1,170	1,171	1,172			
Electorate: 95,272 Valid: 83,753 Quota: 9,306 Turnout: 87.9%

- Griffith died on 12 August 1922; his seat remained vacant at dissolution.
- Coote died on 14 December 1924; his seat remained vacant at dissolution.

1925 General Election: Fermanagh and Tyrone (8 seats)
Party	Candidate	FPv%	Count							
Party	Candidate	FPv%	1	2	3	4	5	6	7	8
Nationalist	Alexander Donnelly	14.6	12,098							
UUP	Edward Archdale	14.3	11,834							
UUP	Rowley Elliott	12.2	10,115							
UUP	William Thomas Miller	11.6	9,593							
Nationalist	Cahir Healy	11.1	9,191	9,358						
UUP	James Cooper	10.8	8,923	8,935	11,569					
Nationalist	Thomas Harbison	10.0	8,257	10,920						
Nationalist	John McHugh	8.0	6,584	6,617	6,620	6,716	6,743	6,848	8,328	8,337
Republican	Thomas Larkin	5.4	4,483	4,504	4,507	4,560	4,585	4,607	4,838	4,840
Republican	Seán O'Mahoney	2.0	1,652	1,661	1,662	1,672	1,681	1,692	1,708	1,713
Electorate: 96,388 Valid: 82,730 Quota: 9,193 Turnout: 85.8%
