= Roderick O'Connor (politician) =

Politician from Northern Ireland

Roderick O'Connor (1910 – 23 January 2000) was a nationalist politician in Northern Ireland.

O'Connor was a solicitor and a director of the Ulster Herald series of newspapers. He became active in the Nationalist Party and sat on various boards in County Tyrone.

O'Connor was elected at the 1949 Northern Ireland general election for West Tyrone, and held his seat at each subsequent election, until the Parliament of Northern Ireland was abolished in 1972. In 1958, he worked with Eddie McAteer to prevent the Nationalist Party becoming the official opposition at Stormont. When, in 1965, they finally accepted the role, O'Connor became the Opposition Chief Whip and the Shadow Minister of Home Affairs. In 1969, he became the final Chairman of the Nationalist Party at Stormont.

Parliament of Northern Ireland
Preceded by Alex Donnelly	Member of Parliament for West Tyrone; 1949–1973	Parliament abolished
Party political offices
Preceded by Eddie McAteer	Leader of the Nationalist Party at Stormont; 1969–1972	Parliament abolished
