= Robert Newton Anderson =

Unionist politician from Northern Ireland

- Born: 8 December 1871; County Fermanagh, Ireland
- Died: 23 May 1948 (aged 76)
- Occupations: Politician, Merchant, and Manufacturer
- Spouse: Lydia "Lily" Elizabeth Smith
- Children: 5

Sir Robert Newton Anderson (8 December 1871 – 23 May 1948) was a unionist politician in Ireland.

== Biography ==
Born in County Fermanagh, Anderson ran a company making hosiery in Derry. He became active in the Irish Unionist Party and was elected as Mayor of Derry, serving from 1915 until 1919. After the partition of Ireland, he was elected to the Parliament of Northern Ireland representing Londonderry, serving from 1921 until the seat's abolition in 1929. He also served on the Irish Convention as the Deputy Lieutenant for the City of Derry.

Anderson was knighted in the 1918 New Year Honours, and appointed to the Privy Council of Northern Ireland in 1927. His son, Albert, followed him into politics.

Civic offices
Preceded by William McLearn	Mayor of Londonderry; 1915–1919	Succeeded by Hugh O'Doherty
