= Cahir Healy =

Irish politician (1877–1970)

Healy in 1932

Charles Everard Healy (2 December 1877 – 8 February 1970) was an Irish politician. He was a leader of northern nationalists and a self-educated man who made major contributions to Ireland's political, cultural and literary heritage.

== Background ==
Born in Mountcharles in County Donegal, Healy became a journalist working on various local papers. He joined the Irish Republican organisation Sinn Féin at its founding in 1905.

== Opposition to partition ==
Healy later became anti-partitionist and campaigned against the inclusion of County Fermanagh and County Tyrone into Northern Ireland as they had Irish nationalist majorities. With the pending partition of Ireland, Healy worked with the cabinet of the Second Dáil (the southern Irish parliament) and, in 1922, was a member of Michael Collins' special advisory committee on the north-east of the island. In August 1921 Healy was part of a Fermanagh nationalist delegation that met with Éamon de Valera and made clear their feelings on a Northern Irish parliament: "Fermanagh by a large majority ... resolved that it would not submit to the partition parliament in Ulster". In a letter from Lloyd George to de Valera (dated 7 September 1921) regarding the inclusion of Tyrone and Fermanagh into a new northern state, the British prime minister stated that his government had a very weak case on the issue of "forcing these two counties against their will" into Northern Ireland.

Following the 22 May 1922 assassination of William J. Twaddell (a Unionist Member of Parliament in Belfast), Healy was interned for eighteen months along with 300 others under brutal conditions on the prison ship HMS Argenta. Healy is quoted on the reasons for his arrest and internment: "All my life, I have been a man of peace. It is not, therefore, because they feared that I would disturb the peace of Northern Ireland that they dragged me away from my wife and family, but for political reasons. I have been engaged in preparing the case for the inclusion of these areas (Fermanagh and Tyrone) in the Free State. To get me out of the way, local politicians urged my arrest."

== Parliamentary representative ==
While interned on the Argenta, Healy was elected in the 1922 UK general election to represent Fermanagh and Tyrone as a Nationalist Party MP, with the support of Sinn Féin. Healy was re-elected in 1923 but remained in custody until February 1924 and was prohibited from entering the western part of Fermanagh (he did not defend his seat). In June 1924 Healy pressed the government to compensate the thousands of Northern Ireland citizens that were forced to flee Belfast during serious sectarian violence.

Healy was also elected to the Northern Ireland House of Commons in the 1925 Northern Ireland general election but did not take his seat until 1927 due to the nationalist abstentionist policy. In his fight against partition, Healy did not support the use of physical force or abstentionism: "... physical force only consolidates Unionist opinion against us, and result in injury to Catholics as a whole ... if abstention is to become a policy ... it should be abstention from public boards ... as well as refusal to pay rates and taxes. If this policy of civil disobedience is not feasible (and I admit it is not), then abstention from Stormont is just an insincere gesture." In 1928, Healy and the influential nationalist politician Joe Devlin became founder members of the National League of the North, which was committed to bringing about Irish reunification through consent and parliamentary means. Whenever Healy or Devlin raised issues relating to Northern Ireland (in both the British and Northern Ireland parliaments), they were routinely ruled out of order. In 1929, with the break-up of the large Fermanagh and Tyrone constituency, Healy switched to sit for the new seat of South Fermanagh. In a 1931 by-election, he was again elected for Fermanagh and Tyrone to the Westminster parliament but stood down again in 1935. In a 24 April 1934 speech to the Northern Ireland parliament, Healy made clear his feelings on the ruling Unionist government and its treatment of Catholics:

"We know there is today no place for a Catholic in any public office. They are banned more effectively by the bigotry, secret and open, of the Northern Ministers, than they were in the days before the passing of the Catholic Emancipation. But for all that, we are not despairing...What Cromwell attempted in vain you will also attempt in vain. God and right are with us and will prevail over all your machinations. This is not the last generation. Neither will your threats cause us to change our ideals, of a united and free Ireland".

== World War II and beyond ==
Healy was interned again by the UK government for a year during the Second World War, under Defence Regulation 18B, and held in Brixton Prison until December 1942. After the war Healy helped launch the broad based Irish Anti-Partition League, which worked to foster public and political opinion in Britain and the United States against partition. Healy also worked with the Labour Party in Britain and helped establish the parliamentary pressure group Friends of Ireland (UK). In 1945 Healy wrote the widely read anti-partition pamphlet The Mutilation of a Nation, which sold over 10.000 copies. In 1950 he was elected to the British House of Commons for a third time, on this occasion representing Fermanagh and South Tyrone. He was returned to Westminster for the final time in 1952 and took his seat in parliament the same year. He held the seat until he stood down in 1955. He left the Northern Ireland House of Commons in 1965, by which point he was the Father of the House.

== Later life ==
Healy became an insurance official in Enniskillen but continued to write, his output including journalism, poetry, short stories and at least one volume of poetry The Lane and the Thrushes with Cathal O'Byrne. He was a correspondent for a number of Irish and American papers. Over the years, Healy wrote hundreds of historical articles, scripts and plays for the Irish, British and United States media. Possessing a special interest in Irish history and folklore, in the 1960s he was a founder of the Ulster Folk and Transport Museum. In 2025 the book Mind the Gap: Borders, Limits and Frontiers: Collected Essays and Cahir Healy's Memoirs from a ‘Northern Ireland’ Prison Ship was published presenting Healys experiences on the Argenta. He died on 8 February 1970 and was buried at Breandrum Cemetery, Enniskillen, County Fermanagh.

Parliament of the United Kingdom
New constituency	MP for Fermanagh and Tyrone; 1922–1924; With: Thomas Harbison	Succeeded by James Pringle / Charles Falls
Preceded by Thomas Harbison	MP for Fermanagh and Tyrone; 1931–1935; With: Joseph Devlin to 1934; Joe Stewart from 1934	Succeeded by Patrick Cunningham / Anthony Mulvey
New constituency	MP for Fermanagh and South Tyrone; 1950–1955	Succeeded by Philip Clarke
Parliament of Northern Ireland
Preceded by Arthur Griffith; Edward Archdale; William Coote; Seán Milroy; William Thomas Miller; James Cooper; Seán O'Mahony; Thomas Harbison	MP for Fermanagh and Tyrone; 1925–1929; With: Edward Archdale; Alexander Donnelly; William Thomas Miller; Rowley Elliott; Thomas Harbison; James Cooper; John McHugh	Constituency abolished
New constituency	MP for South Fermanagh; 1929–1965	Succeeded by John Carron
Preceded by J. M. Andrews	Father of the House; 1953–1965	Succeeded by 1st Viscount Brookeborough
