= Thomas Lyons (politician) =

Northern Irish politician

William Samuel Fyffe

Chairman of Ways and Means and Deputy Speaker of the Northern Ireland House of Commons
- In office 1955–1969
- Preceded by: Terence O'Neill
- Succeeded by: Walter Scott (Northern Ireland politician)

Member of Parliament for North Tyrone
- In office 1943–1969
- Preceded by: James Fulton Gamble
- Succeeded by: William Samuel Fyffe

Personal details
- Born: February 18, 1896
- Died: May 18, 1985 (aged 89)

Thomas Lyons (18 February 1896 – 16 May 1985) was a unionist politician in Northern Ireland.

Lyons studied at Albert Agricultural College in Glasnevin, then emigrated to Australia in 1922. He returned to Ireland in 1939, and was elected for the Ulster Unionist Party in North Tyrone in 1943. At the 1945 general election, he stood unsuccessfully in Fermanagh and Tyrone. He served as Chairman of Ways and Means and Deputy Speaker of the Northern Ireland House of Commons from 1955 until 1969, when he was deselected by his constituency association and stood down. In 1961, he served as High Sheriff of County Tyrone.

Parliament of Northern Ireland
Preceded by James Fulton Gamble	Member of Parliament for North Tyrone; 1943–1969	Succeeded by William Samuel Fyffe
Political offices
Preceded by Terence O'Neill	Chairman of Ways and Means and Deputy Speaker of the Northern Ireland House of Commons; 1955–1969	Succeeded by Walter Scott
