= Robert James Mitchell =

Politician from Northern Ireland

Member of Parliament for North Armagh
- In office 1969–1973
- Preceded by: Dinah McNabb
- Succeeded by: Parliament abolished

Personal details
- Born: 1912
- Died: 5 January, 1998 (aged 85–86)

Robert James Mitchell (1912 – 5 January 1998) was a unionist politician in Northern Ireland.

After becoming a captain during World War II, Mitchell worked as a sales representative. He was elected to Lurgan Borough Council in 1957 for the Ulster Unionist Party, serving until its abolition in 1973. He was elected in the 1969 Northern Ireland general election in North Armagh, serving from 1971 until 1972 as Secretary of the 1966 Committee of backbenchers. He was expelled from the Ulster Unionist Parliamentary Party in January 1972 when he voted for a Democratic Unionist Party censure motion opposing a ban on certain processions planned for 12 July.

The Parliament was prorogued in 1972 and abolished the following year. Mitchell stood in Armagh for the 1973 Assembly, but was not elected. In 1989, he joined the Conservatives in Northern Ireland, and became Vice-Chairman of the party's East Londonderry association.

Parliament of Northern Ireland
Preceded by Dinah McNabb	Member of Parliament for North Armagh; 1969–1973	Parliament abolished
