= Charles Falls =

Charles Fausset Falls (1 January 1860 – 20 September 1936) was a unionist politician in Northern Ireland.

Falls studied on HMS Conway and then at Trinity College, Dublin, then managed the family estate, at Fallsbrook, County Tyrone. During World War I, he served as a major in the Royal Inniskilling Fusiliers.

Falls stood unsuccessfully for the Ulster Unionist Party (UUP) in Fermanagh and Tyrone at the 1923 UK general election, being defeated by two Nationalist Party candidates. At the 1924 election, the Nationalist Party did not stand, and Falls was elected alongside fellow UUP member James Pringle, easily beating two Sinn Féin members. Falls did not stand in 1929, when two Nationalist Party members gained the constituency unopposed.

== Personal life ==
Falls' eldest son was the historian Cyril Falls.

Parliament of the United Kingdom
| Preceded by Thomas Harbison and Cahir Healy | Member of Parliament for Fermanagh & Tyrone; 1924–1929; With: James Pringle | Succeeded by Joseph Devlin and Thomas Harbison |
