= Stormont constituencies =

Stormont constituencies may refer to:

- Northern Ireland Parliament constituencies, used for the Northern Ireland Parliament 1921–1972
- Northern Ireland Assembly constituencies, used for Northern Ireland Assemblies 1973, 1982, and since 1998
