= William Samuel Fyffe =

Member of Parliament for North Tyrone
- In office 1969–1973
- Preceded by: Thomas Lyons
- Succeeded by: Parliament abolished

Personal details
- Born: 7 September 1914 Strabane, Northern Ireland
- Died: 15 April 1989 (aged 74)

William Samuel Fyffe (7 September 1914 – 15 April 1989) was a unionist politician in Northern Ireland.

Born on Gourlieville Terrace in Strabane, Fyffe was the son of Wilson Fyffe, a Solicitors Clerk, and Margaret Cochrane. Fyffe worked as a journalist and became active in the Ulster Unionist Party. He was the Chairman of the North West Cricket Union, and was known for his strident opposition to civil rights marches.

Fyffe was narrowly elected in North Tyrone at the 1969 Northern Ireland general election, serving until the Parliament was prorogued in 1972.

Parliament of Northern Ireland
Preceded by Thomas Lyons	Member of Parliament for North Tyrone; 1969–1973	Parliament abolished
