= Florence Elliott =

Northern Irish nurse (1905–1996)

Florence Eileen Elliott
- Born: 6 October 1905; Randalstown, Ireland
- Died: 2 August 1996 (aged 90); Northern Ireland
- Occupation: Nurse

Florence Eileen Elliott OBE (6 October 1905 – 2 August 1996) was a Northern Irish nurse who has been described as "one of the most outstanding nurses that Northern Ireland has produced". She was awarded an OBE in 1951.

== Family and early life ==
Born in 1905 to Robert (Robin) Cummings Elliott, Presbyterian minister of Duneane (Antrim) and Florence Wheeler Elliott (nee Steed) in Randalstown. She had a sister, Doreen Mary and a brother Robert (Robin)Cummings. Her uncle on her father's side was Rowley Elliott, MP. Affectionately known as "Lyla", she was a sickly child, which may have led her to a career as a nurse.

== Training ==
Elliott trained at the Royal Victoria Hospital, Belfast, qualifying as a registered nurse in 1930.

After several years she attended the Elsie Inglis Memorial Maternity Hospital in Edinburgh to train for six months as a midwife.

== Career ==
After she qualified, Elliott remained at the Royal working as Sister of Wards 7 and 8 before going to Edinburgh to train as midwife. She then remained there working as a midwife and midwifery sister following her training.

She returned to Belfast somewhat reluctantly to take up the post of Matron of Whiteabbey Sanatorium in 1943, after being encouraged to apply for the position. The sanatorium was in a state of low morale further acerbated by a newspaper scandal and over a three-year period, Elliott worked to readdress these issues, establishing a training scheme for all the nurses, affiliating the sanatorium with Belfast City Hospital, as they were previously unable to get recognition outside the hospital.

Again somewhat reluctantly, in 1946 she took up the post of Matron at the Royal Victoria Hospital, the first Royal trained nurse as well as the first from Northern Ireland to hold this position, remaining there until retirement in 1966.

Whilst at the Royal she ensured that nurses under her charge went on training courses across the UK as well as locally. She also sought out bursaries and scholarships from Denmark, Paris and Columbia University to help her staff.

Starting out in the role Elliott was instrumental in the successful transition of her staff and patients into the new National Health Service in 1948. With the resulting expansion of the hospital in 1950 Elliott "compelled the respect of the Medical Staff and the devotion of her nurses throughout this difficult period".

In 1949 Elliott formed the Royal Victoria Hospital League of Nurses, which was instrumental to keeping nurses in contact with the hospital and contributed to staffing issues by attracting former nurses to work again.

A highly respected nurse, Elliott was known for her work not only augmenting the training and working conditions of her nurses but improving patients' comfort and experience. This included such changes as coloured bedsheets, individual trays, full evening meals, cooked breakfast, full bed curtains for added privacy, extended visiting periods, and a night admissions unit to minimise disturbance of sleeping patients.

== Later years ==
Following retirement she was awarded an Honorary Masters from Queen's University, Belfast. She moved to Melbourne, Australia, living with her friend Joyce Long, establishing an Australian branch of the Royal Victoria Hospital League of Nurses and was a point of contact for Royal nurses, medical students and doctors.

She returned to Belfast in 1990, accompanied by Long, settling in Templepatrick, remaining there until her death.

== Awards and legacy ==
- 1951 OBE (civil division)
- 1964-65 UK vice-president of Royal College of Nursing
- 1966 Life Governor of the Royal Victoria Hospital
- 1967 Honorary Master of Arts (MA) Degree at Queen's University, Belfast
- 1982 Annual Florence Elliott Lecture was instituted in her honour
- 1994 The Florence Elliott Prize for candidates for the BSc (Honours) or Diploma in Nursing Sciences at Queen's University
- 1994 The Florence Elliott Scholarship Fund for staff in School of Nursing and Midwifery, Queen's University
