= Alex Donnelly =

Alexander Ernest Donnelly, known as Alex Donnelly (1878 – 9 May 1958), was a nationalist politician and solicitor in Ireland.

Donnelly studied at the Christian Brothers School in Omagh and the Royal University of Ireland. He was elected to Tyrone County Council in 1914, holding his seat until 1951, holding the post of council chairman from 1920 to 1924. He was also a member of Omagh Urban District Council. In 1916, he was a founder member of Sinn Féin in the county, alongside Cahir Healy, James McHugh and Basil McGuckin.

At the 1925 Northern Ireland general election, Donnelly was elected for the Nationalist Party in Fermanagh and Tyrone. He first took his seat in November 1927. His seat was abolished in 1929, and he was instead elected for West Tyrone. He held this seat until he retired in 1949.

Parliament of Northern Ireland
| Preceded by Edward Archdale; William Coote; Seán Milroy; William Thomas Miller; James Cooper; Seán O'Mahony; Thomas Harbison | Member of Parliament for Fermanagh and Tyrone; 1925–1929; With: Edward Archdale; Rowley Elliott; William Thomas Miller; Cahir Healy; Thomas Harbison; James Cooper; John McHugh | Constituency divided |
| New constituency | Member of Parliament for West Tyrone; 1929–1949 | Succeeded by Roderick O'Connor |
