= North Armagh (Northern Ireland Parliament constituency) =

Coordinates: 54.453°N 6.327°W

- Former County constituency for the Parliament of Northern Ireland
- North Armagh shown within Northern Ireland

Former constituency
- Created: 1929
- Abolished: 1973
- Election method: First past the post

North Armagh was a constituency of the Parliament of Northern Ireland.

== Boundaries ==
North Armagh was a county constituency comprising the northern part of County Armagh. It was created when the House of Commons (Method of Voting and Redistribution of Seats) Act (Northern Ireland) 1929 introduced first-past-the-post elections throughout Northern Ireland. North Armagh was created by the division of Armagh into four new constituencies. The constituency survived unchanged, returning one member of Parliament, until the Parliament of Northern Ireland was temporarily suspended in 1972, and then formally abolished in 1973.

The seat was centred on the town of Lurgan and included parts of the rural districts of Armagh and Lurgan.

== Politics ==
The seat was always won by Ulster Unionist Party candidates. It was contested on five occasions, three times by nationalist candidates, once by a Northern Ireland Labour Party member, and once by an independent Unionist. The nationalist and Labour candidates each took 30 - 40% of the votes cast.

== Members of Parliament ==
Elected	Party	Name
1929	UUP	John Johnston
1945	UUP	Dinah McNabb
1969	UUP	Robert James Mitchell

== Election results ==
At the 1929, 1933 and 1938 Northern Ireland general elections, John Johnston was elected unopposed.

General Election 1945: North Armagh
Party	Candidate	Votes	%	±%
UUP	Dinah McNabb	8,645	64.1	N/A
NI Labour	Thompson Ferron	4,849	35.9	New
Majority		3,796	28.2	N/A
Turnout		13,494	76.9	N/A
UUP hold		Swing	N/A	

General Election 1949: North Armagh
Party	Candidate	Votes	%	±%
UUP	Dinah McNabb	9,705	65.6	+1.5
Nationalist	John McAlinden	5,099	34.4	New
Majority		4,606	31.2	+3.0
Turnout		14,804	79.2	+2.3
UUP hold		Swing		

At the 1953 Northern Ireland general election, Dinah McNabb was elected unopposed.

General Election 1958: North Armagh
Party	Candidate	Votes	%	±%
UUP	Dinah McNabb	9,584	81.1	N/A
Ind. Unionist	Samuel Blevins	2,230	18.9	New
Majority		7,354	62.2	N/A
Turnout		11,814	61.1	N/A
UUP hold		Swing	N/A	

At the 1962 Northern Ireland general election, Dinah McNabb was elected unopposed.

General Election 1965: North Armagh
Party	Candidate	Votes	%	±%
UUP	Dinah McNabb	8,546	68.2	N/A
National Democratic	John F. B. Elliott	3,981	31.8	New
Majority		4,565	36.4	N/A
Turnout		12,527	62.4	N/A
UUP hold		Swing	N/A	

General Election 1969: North Armagh
Party	Candidate	Votes	%	±%
UUP	Robert James Mitchell	9,087	60.8	−7.4
National Democratic	Adrian James Kennedy	5,847	39.2	+7.4
Majority		3,240	21.6	−14.8
Turnout		14,961	72.3	+0.9
UUP hold		Swing		
