= Dinah McNabb =

Member of Parliament for North Armagh
- In office 1945–1969
- Preceded by: John Johnston
- Succeeded by: Robert James Mitchell

Personal details
- Born: Lurgan, Northern Ireland

Dinah McNabb (died December 1988) was a unionist politician in Northern Ireland.

Born in Lurgan, McNabb studied at Queen's University, Belfast. She was elected to Armagh County Council for the Ulster Unionist Party, and was then elected at the 1945 Northern Ireland general election in North Armagh, serving until her retirement in 1969.

McNabb was a strong supporter of the Lord's Day Observance Society and throughout the 1940s campaigned against greyhound racing on Sundays, particularly in her home town of Lurgan.

McNabb was a bitter opponent of the development of the new town of Craigavon in the area she represented, and was in particular concerned that compensation payments to farmers took no account of their attachment to the land. In February 1966, she gave a thirty-minute speech attacking the project, which culminated in her resignation from the government. She lent support to other projects, and led calls for the construction of a bridge or tunnel to connect Northern Ireland with Britain.

McNabb also served as the first Chairman of the 1966 Committee of backbenchers, from its establishment until 1968, and was the President of the Federation of Soroptimists of Great Britain and Ireland.

Parliament of Northern Ireland
Preceded by John Johnston	Member of Parliament for North Armagh; 1945–1969	Succeeded by Robert James Mitchell
Party political offices
New office	Chairman of the 66 Committee; 1966–1968	Succeeded by John Dobson
