= Rowley Elliott =

Rowley Elliott (23 April 1877 – 17 December 1944) was a Unionist politician in Northern Ireland.

== Family and early life ==
Eldest of three sons of John R. Elliott, J.P, Coagh, his sisters were May Boyton Aiken and Agnes Witherow Bell. He was educated at Cookstown Academy and the Royal Belfast Academical Institution. He married Annie Mary Berkeley and had one son; John Rowley Berkeley Elliott, and two daughters; Muriel and Miss A. Elliott. His niece was Florence Elliott, OBE.

== Career ==
After school he entered his father's business, Messrs. J. E. Elliott, Ltd., hardware merchants and grocers, as Postmaster Grocer and Hardware Merchant. Following this he went to become a farmer and breeder of Shorthorn cattle. At the same time he was a member of Tyrone County Council and served as its chairman. He was a justice of the peace and Deputy Lieutenant for County Tyrone. From 1925 to 1944 he was the Unionist Member of Parliament (MP) in the Northern Ireland parliament for Fermanagh and Tyrone and then South Tyrone. Elliott was also a member of the Orange Institution for many years, as well as the Masonic Order.

From 1941 to 1943 he served as Parliamentary Secretary to the Ministry of Labour under J. M. Andrews.

== Sources ==
- http://www.election.demon.co.uk/stormont/biographies.html

Parliament of Northern Ireland
| Preceded by Arthur Griffith; Edward Archdale; William Coote; Seán Milroy; William Thomas Miller; James Cooper; Seán O'Mahony; Thomas Harbison | Member of Parliament for Fermanagh and Tyrone; 1925–1929; With: Edward Archdale; Alexander Donnelly; William Thomas Miller; Cahir Healy; Thomas Harbison; James Cooper; John McHugh | Constituency divided |
| New constituency | Member of Parliament for South Tyrone; 1929–1944 | Succeeded by William Frederick McCoy |
Political offices
| Preceded by William Grant | Parliamentary Secretary to the Ministry of Labour; 1941–1943 | Office abolished |
