= 1918 East Tyrone by-election =

UK Parliamentary by-election

The 1918 East Tyrone by-election was held on 3 April 1918. The by-election was held due to the resignation of the incumbent Irish Parliamentary Party MP, William Redmond. It was won by the Irish Parliamentary candidate Thomas Harbison. The by-election was the last in a short string of by-elections where it seemed that the more moderate nationalists were regaining ground from Sinn Féin before being virtually wiped out in the 1918 United Kingdom general election in Ireland.

== Campaign ==
Redmond had resigned in order to contest the Waterford City by-election which had become vacant when his father, John Redmond, had died. Thomas Harbison was selected as the IPP candidate. The Sinn Féin candidate was Seán Milroy.

The campaign was fought with tensions between the two parties with both party leaders, Joseph Devlin (IPP) and Éamon de Valera (SF), visiting to support their candidate. Sinn Fein supporters would regularly walk around the streets armed with Gaelic games hurleys while Irish Parliamentary Party members would throw stones at the Sinn Fein delegations. A consideration in the campaign was how the Irish Unionists in the constituency would vote as there was no Unionist candidate in the by-election. Sinn Fein expected them to mostly abstain but they largely voted tactically in favour of the IPP.

The day before the election, Sinn Fein attempted to hold an open air meeting in the Market Square in Dungannon but were delayed due to Unionists blocking the road. After they were moved on, Sinn Fein instead elected to hold speeches on the steps of the Technical Institute. This was near where the IPP were holding a rally and despite the Royal Irish Constabulary keeping them apart, IPP members interrupted the Sinn Fein speeches.

== Result ==
By-election 3 April 1918: East Tyrone
Party	Candidate	Votes	%	±%
Irish Parliamentary	Thomas Harbison	1,802	59.6	+8.4
Sinn Féin	Seán Milroy	1,222	40.4	New
Majority		580	19.2	+16.8
Turnout		3,024	43.9	−49.2
Irish Parliamentary hold		Swing		
