= 1897 Belfast Corporation election =

Local election in Belfast

An election to Belfast Corporation took place on Thursday 25 November 1897 as part of that year's local elections.

This was the first election for Belfast Corporation since 1887. Since that election the Belfast Corporation Act 1896 had increased the borough from 6,800 to 16,500 acres, and the electorate from 39,603 to 47,294. The need to delineate new ward boundaries meant that elections could not be completed in 1896, resulting in them being delayed until 1897.

== Results by party ==
Belfast Corporation election, 1897
Party	Seats	Gains	Losses	Net gain/loss	Seats %	Votes %	Votes	+/−
Belfast Conservative Association	33							
Catholic Association	8							
Independent	8							
Belfast LRC	6							
Liberal Unionist	5							
Joint Committee of the INL & INF	0							

== Ward results ==
=== Court ===
Court Ward Electorate: 2,882
Party	Candidate	Votes	%
Belfast LRC	Alex Taylor	1,028	
	Tougher	977	
	Young*	666	
	Dr Stewart	644	
Turnout		1,986	68.91
Belfast LRC gain from			

=== Duncairn ===
Duncairn Ward - 3 seats Electorate: 3,527
Party	Candidate	Votes	%
Belfast LRC	Alexander Bowman	1,249	
Irish Conservative	Dr Timothy White	1,196	
Independent	Robert Wilson (incumbent)	1,010	
Irish Conservative	John Thompson	839	
Irish Conservative	James McCammond	767	
Turnout			
Belfast LRC gain from			

=== Falls ===
==== Alderman ====
Falls Ward (1)
Party	Candidate	Votes	%
	McCormick	1,280	60.15
	James McCann	848	39.85
Turnout		2,128	

==== Councillors ====
Falls Ward (3)
Party	Candidate	Votes	%
Catholic Association	McDonnell	1,300	
Catholic Association	P. J. McGee	1,272	
Catholic Association	Cook	1,236	
INL & INF	Fegan	764	
INL & INF	Rooney	744	
INL & INF	Connolly	702	
Turnout			

=== Pottinger ===
Pottinger Ward
Party	Candidate	Votes	%
Belfast LRC	Murray Davis		
Turnout			
Belfast LRC gain from			

=== Shankhill ===
Shankill Ward (3 councillors)
Party	Candidate	Votes	%
Belfast LRC	Robert Gageby	1,836	
	Johnston	1,326	
	Workman	1,281	
	Gault	760	
	Bell	583	
Turnout			
Belfast LRC gain from			

=== Smithfield ===
Smithfield Ward (3)
Party	Candidate	Votes	%	
Catholic Association	O'Connell	1184		{{{change}}}
Catholic Association	McEntee	1158		{{{change}}}
Catholic Association	McLorinan	1080		{{{change}}}
INL & INF	Aicken	823		{{{change}}}
INL & INF	McGuigan	795		{{{change}}}
INL & INF	Riordan	731		{{{change}}}
Turnout				

=== St. George's & Dock ===
St. George's and Dock Ward
Party	Candidate	Votes	%
Belfast LRC	William Liddell		
Turnout			
Belfast LRC gain from			

=== Victoria ===
Victoria Ward Electorate: 2,714
Party	Candidate	Votes	%
Belfast LRC	Edward McInness	781	
Irish Conservative	John McCormick*	735	
Irish Conservative	Millar	723	
Irish Conservative	Dr Cathcart	671	
	William Hill	316	
	Dunwoody	66	
Turnout		1,933	
Belfast LRC gain from			

Preceded by 1887 Belfast Corporation election	Belfast Corporation elections	Succeeded by 1899 Belfast Corporation election
