= Thomas Harbison =

Irish politician (1864–1930)

Member of Parliament for Fermanagh and Tyrone
- In office 1929–1930
- Preceded by: James Pringle; Charles Falls
- Succeeded by: Cahir Healy

Member of Parliament for Fermanagh and Tyrone
- In office 1922–1924
- Preceded by: New constituency
- Succeeded by: James Pringle; Charles Falls

Member of Parliament for North East Tyrone
- In office 1918–1922
- Preceded by: New constituency
- Succeeded by: Constituency abolished

Member of Parliament for East Tyrone
- In office Apr. 1918 – Nov. 1918
- Preceded by: William Redmond
- Succeeded by: Constituency abolished

Member of the Northern Ireland Parliament for Fermanagh and Tyrone
- In office 1921–1929

Personal details
- Born: 8 November 1864 County Tyrone, Ireland
- Died: 22 November 1930 (aged 66)
- Party: Irish Parliamentary Party
- Spouses: Elizabeth Maguire; Annie Beveridge
- Education: St Malachy's College

Thomas James Stanislaus Harbison (8 November 1864 – 22 November 1930) was an Irish nationalist politician.

He was born in Cookstown, County Tyrone, to John Harbison, a general merchant, and Isabella Daly.

Harbison studied at St Malachy's College in Belfast. He became active in the Irish Parliamentary Party, acting from 1906 until 1910 as the election agent for William Redmond and Tom Kettle. In 1911, he was elected to Tyrone County Council.

In 1916 Harbison believed that his Irish Parliamentary Party would "never entertain the idea" of partition. After attending the Irish Convention, (July 1917 - March 1918) he was elected to Westminster at the 1918 East Tyrone by-election, after Redmond resigned it to contest Waterford City. At the 1918 general election, Harbison was elected for North East Tyrone. Speaking in the House of Commons on (11 November 1920), the day that the Government of Ireland Act 1920 was passed, Harbison made clear his feelings on the Act and the Partition of Ireland:

"This is not a Bill for the better government of Ireland. I believe that the people in the county that I represent would be legally justified in using every form of resistance in their power to prevent this Act, if it ever becomes an Act, from coming into operation. It is a sentence of death, in my opinion, upon us as a unit in that Parliament. Our liberties are gone; and if the younger men of Ireland become indignant, and take courses that no sane man could defend, who will be responsible? The responsibility will be upon the men who have produced this Bill at the dictates of a narrow-minded set of reactionaries in the North-East corner of Ulster. It is a very small corner of Ulster; I have the map of it here. A set of reactionaries in that corner will have us under their heel for all time. I know the feeling of the men whom I represent, and I assure you, on this Armistice night, when all should be peace, that you are going to create, not peace, but eternal dissatisfaction, division, and, I am afraid, destruction."

At the 1921 Northern Ireland general election, Harbison was elected on an abstentionist platform for Fermanagh and Tyrone. At the 1922 United Kingdom general election, he was elected for the Westminster constituency of Fermanagh and Tyrone along with Cahir Healy for the Nationalist Party. With majorities of more than 6,000 votes over the Unionist candidates, their elections were seen as a plebiscite on the issue of the partition of Ireland. He stood down from the Westminster seat at the 1924 election, and in 1927 took his seat at Stormont. In 1929, he stood down from his Stormont seat, but was again elected to Westminster, serving until his death a year later.

== Sources ==
- Northern Ireland Parliament Elections Results: Biographies

Parliament of the United Kingdom
Preceded by William Redmond	Member of Parliament for East Tyrone; Apr. 1918–Nov. 1918	Constituency abolished
New constituency	Member of Parliament for North East Tyrone; 1918–1922	Constituency abolished
New constituency	Member of Parliament for Fermanagh and Tyrone; 1922–1924; With: Cahir Healy	Succeeded by James Pringle; Charles Falls
Preceded by James Pringle; Charles Falls	Member of Parliament for Fermanagh and Tyrone; 1929–1930; With: Joseph Devlin	Succeeded by Cahir Healy
Parliament of Northern Ireland
New parliament	Member of Parliament for Fermanagh and Tyrone; 1921–1929; With: Arthur Griffith 1921–1922; William Coote 1921–1924; Seán Milroy 1921–1925; William Thomas Miller 1921–1929; James Cooper 1921–1929; Seán O'Mahony 1921–1925; Alex Donnelly 1925–1929; Rowley Elliott 1925–1929; Cahir Healy 1925–1929; John McHugh 1925–1929	Constituency divided
