= William Thomas Miller =

Politician from Northern Ireland

Member of Parliament for Fermanagh and Tyrone
- In office 1921–1929 Serving with Arthur Griffith (1921–1922); William Coote (1921–1924); Seán Milroy (1921–1925); Edward Archdale (1921–1929); James Cooper (1921–1929); Seán O'Mahony (1921–1925); Thomas Harbison (1921–1929); Alex Donnelly (1925–1929); Rowley Elliott (1925–1929); Cahir Healy (1925–1929); John McHugh (1925–1929)

Personal details
- Born: 1865 Newtownstewart, England
- Died: 30 October 1930 (aged 64–65)
- Party: Unionist
- Education: Methodist College Belfast

William Thomas Miller (1865 – 6 October 1930) was a Northern Irish Unionist politician.

== Biography ==
A farmer, he was born in Newtownstewart in 1865. He was educated at the Model School, Newtownstewart; and the Intermediate School, Newtownstewart; and the Methodist College Belfast. He was a member of Strabane Rural District Council and of Tyrone County Council.

He unsuccessfully contested the North West Tyrone constituency in the 1918 United Kingdom general election, losing to Sinn Féin's Arthur Griffith. In 1921, he was elected to House of Commons of Northern Ireland for the constituency of Fermanagh and Tyrone, and was re-elected in 1925. In 1929, he was elected for the constituency of North Tyrone. He died in 1930 and at the subsequent by-election James Gamble was elected unopposed.

Parliament of Northern Ireland
New parliament	Member of Parliament for Fermanagh and Tyrone; 1921–1929; With: Arthur Griffith 1921–1922; William Coote 1921–1924; Seán Milroy 1921–1925; Edward Archdale 1921–1929; James Cooper 1921–1929; Seán O'Mahony 1921–1925; Thomas Harbison 1921–1929; Alex Donnelly 1925–1929; Rowley Elliott 1925–1929; Cahir Healy 1925–1929; John McHugh 1925–1929	Constituency divided
New constituency from part of Fermanagh and Tyrone	Member of Parliament for North Tyrone; 1929–1930	Succeeded by James Gamble
