= Sir Edward Archdale, 1st Baronet =

Irish politician

The Right Honourable Sir Edward Archdale Bt DL

Minister of Agriculture of Northern Ireland
- In office 1925–1933

Minister of Agriculture and Commerce of Northern Ireland
- In office 7 June 1921 – 1925

Member of the Northern Ireland Parliament for Enniskillen
- In office 1929–1937

Member of the Northern Ireland Parliament for Fermanagh and Tyrone
- In office 1921–1929

Member of Parliament for North Fermanagh
- In office 1916–1922

Member of Parliament for North Fermanagh
- In office 1898–1903

Personal details
- Born: Edward Mervyn Archdale; 26 January 1853 Rossfad, Enniskillen, County Fermanagh, Ireland
- Died: 1 November 1943 (aged 90)

Sir Edward Mervyn Archdale, 1st Baronet, PC (Ire), DL (26 January 1853 – 1 November 1943) was a Northern Irish politician.

== Early life and naval career ==
Archdale was born the son of Nicholas Montgomery Archdale and his wife Adelaide Mary (née Porter) in Rossfad, County Fermanagh. He entered the Royal Navy in 1867. He was promoted lieutenant in 1875 and retired in 1881.

== Political career ==
He was appointed High Sheriff of Fermanagh for 1884. In 1898 he was elected Conservative Member of Parliament for North Fermanagh. He resigned in March 1903, but regained the seat in 1916. The seat was abolished in 1922.

In 1921 he stood for the new Parliament of Northern Ireland and was elected for Fermanagh and Tyrone. He held that seat until 1929, and was then elected for Enniskillen, retiring in 1937.

From 1921 to 1925, he served as Minister of Agriculture and Commerce in the Government of Northern Ireland. He continued as Minister of Agriculture from 1925 to 1933. As a landowner and practical farmer he was well-qualified for the job. After Archdale's departure from his position, Cahir Healy, a Nationalist leader and member of the Northern Ireland House of Commons, criticised both the Prime Minister of Northern Ireland, James Craig, and Archdale for their public campaign against the employment of Catholics. Healy stated that Archdale's slogan was "No Catholics need apply" and said that this policy was not a new one: "Sir Edward Archdale...declared on 31 March 1925 that out of 109 officials in his Department only four were Roman Catholics, and he apologized for even having four in the service of the Government."

Archdale was appointed to the Privy Council of Ireland in the 1921 New Year Honours, entitling him to the style "The Right Honourable", and was created a baronet in the 1928 Birthday Honours. He was succeeded in the baronetcy by his eldest son, Vice-Admiral Sir Nicholas Edward Archdale.

== Arms ==
Coat of arms of Sir Edward Archdale, 1st Baronet

Notes
Granted 4 October 1928 by Sir Nevile Rodwell Wilkinson, Ulster King of Arms.
Crest
Out of a ducal crest coronet Or an heraldic tiger's head maned tufted and armed Sable.
Escutcheon
Quarterly 1st & 4th Azure a chevron Ermine between three talbots passant Or (Archdale) 2nd Or a chevron Sable (Mervyn) 3rd grandquarterly 1st & 4th Azure three fleurs-de-lis Or 2nd & 3rd Gules three gem-rings Gold all within a bordure Or charged with a tressure flory counterflory Gules in the centre point an inescutcheon Argent charged with a tilting spear and sword saltireways points upwards Proper (Montgomery).
Motto
Data Fata Secuta

== Footnotes ==
Parliament of the United Kingdom
Preceded by Richard Dane	Member of Parliament for North Fermanagh; 1898–1903	Succeeded by Edward Mitchell
Preceded by Godfrey Fetherstonhaugh	Member of Parliament for North Fermanagh; 1916–1922	Succeeded by Thomas Harbison as MP for Fermanagh and Tyrone
Parliament of Northern Ireland
New parliament	Member of Parliament for Fermanagh and Tyrone; 1921–1929; With: Arthur Griffith 1921–1922; William Coote 1921–1924; Seán Milroy 1921–1925; William Thomas Miller 1921–1929; James Cooper 1921–1929; Seán O'Mahony 1921–1925; Thomas Harbison 1921–1929; Alexander Donnelly 1925–1929; Rowley Elliott 1925–1929; Cahir Healy 1925–1929; John McHugh 1925–1929	Constituency divided
New constituency from part of Fermanagh and Tyrone	Member of Parliament for Enniskillen; 1929–1937	Succeeded by Erne Ferguson
Political offices
First	Minister of Commerce of Northern Ireland; 1921–1925	Succeeded by John Milne Barbour
First	Minister of Agriculture of Northern Ireland; 1921–1933	Succeeded by Sir Basil Brooke
Honorary titles
Preceded by The Earl Belmore	Lord Lieutenant of Tyrone; 1913–1916	Succeeded by The Duke of Abercorn
Non-profit organization positions
Preceded by William Lyons	Grand Master of the Orange Institution of Ireland; 1926?–1941?	Succeeded by Sir Joseph Davison
Baronetage of the United Kingdom
New creation	Baronet (of Riversdale, Fermanagh); 1928–1943	Succeeded by Edward Archdale
