= West Tyrone (Northern Ireland Parliament constituency) =

Coordinates: 54.522°N 7.500°W

- Former County constituency for the Parliament of Northern Ireland
- West Tyrone shown within Northern Ireland

Former constituency
- Created: 1929
- Abolished: 1973
- Election method: First past the post

West Tyrone was a constituency of the Parliament of Northern Ireland.

== Boundaries ==
West Tyrone was a county constituency comprising the western part of County Tyrone. It was created when the House of Commons (Method of Voting and Redistribution of Seats) Act (Northern Ireland) 1929 introduced first-past-the-post elections throughout Northern Ireland. West Tyrone was created by the division of Fermanagh and Tyrone into eight new constituencies, of which five were in County Tyrone. The constituency survived unchanged, returning one member of Parliament until the Parliament of Northern Ireland was temporarily suspended in 1972, and then formally abolished in 1973.

The seat was dominated by the town of Omagh, and also included parts of the rural districts of Castlederg and Omagh.

== Politics ==
The constituency was consistently won by members of the Nationalist Party. Members of the Ulster Unionist Party contested the seat on three occasions, thrice winning more than 40% of the vote each time. The remaining elections were uncontested.

== Members of Parliament ==
Year	Member	Party
1929	Alex Donnelly	Nationalist Party
1949	Roderick O'Connor	Nationalist Party

== Election results ==
At the 1929, 1933, 1938 and 1945 Northern Ireland general elections, Alex Donnelly was elected unopposed.

General Election 1949: West Tyrone
Party	Candidate	Votes	%	±%
Nationalist	Roderick O'Connor	7,859	59.3	N/A
UUP	T. McClay	5,396	40.7	New
Majority		2,463	18.6	N/A
Turnout		13,255	84.3	N/A
Nationalist hold		Swing	N/A	

At the 1953 Northern Ireland general election, Roderick O'Connor was elected unopposed.

General Election 1958: West Tyrone
Party	Candidate	Votes	%	±%
Nationalist	Roderick O'Connor	6,750	53.7	N/A
UUP	A. Stewart	5,813	46.3	New
Majority		937	7.4	N/A
Turnout		12,563	81.9	N/A
Nationalist hold		Swing	N/A	

General Election 1962: West Tyrone
Party	Candidate	Votes	%	±%
Nationalist	Roderick O'Connor	7,371	55.8	+2.1
UUP	J. C. Fyffe	5,843	44.2	−2.1
Majority		1,528	11.6	+4.2
Turnout		13,214	87.0	+5.1
Nationalist hold		Swing		

At the 1965 and 1969 Northern Ireland general elections, Roderick O'Connor was elected unopposed.
