= North Tyrone (Northern Ireland Parliament constituency) =

Coordinates: 54.823°N 7.468°W

- Former County constituency for the Parliament of Northern Ireland
- North Tyrone shown within Northern Ireland

Former constituency
- Created: 1929
- Abolished: 1973
- Election method: First past the post

North Tyrone was a constituency of the Parliament of Northern Ireland.

== Boundaries ==
North Tyrone was a county constituency comprising the northern part of County Tyrone. It was created when the House of Commons (Method of Voting and Redistribution of Seats) Act (Northern Ireland) 1929 introduced first-past-the-post elections throughout Northern Ireland. North Tyrone was created by the division of Fermanagh and Tyrone into eight new constituencies, of which five were in County Tyrone. The constituency survived unchanged, returning one member of Parliament until the Parliament of Northern Ireland was temporarily suspended in 1972, and then formally abolished in 1973.

The seat was dominated by the town of Strabane, and also included parts of the rural districts of Castlederg, Omagh, and Strabane.

== Politics ==
The constituency was consistently won by members of the Ulster Unionist Party. Nationalists from various groups contested the seat on two occasions, twice winning more than 40% of the vote, and an independent and two members of minor parties also stood. The remaining elections were uncontested.

== Members of Parliament ==
Year	Member	Party
1929	William Thomas Miller	Ulster Unionist
1930	James Gamble	Ulster Unionist
1943	Thomas Lyons	Ulster Unionist
1969	William Samuel Fyffe	Ulster Unionist

== Election results ==
At the 1929 Northern Ireland general election, William Thomas Miller was elected unopposed.

At the 1930 by-election and the 1933 Northern Ireland general election, James Gamble was elected unopposed.

General Election 1938: North Tyrone
Party	Candidate	Votes	%	±%
UUP	James Fulton Gamble	7,508	65.7	N/A
Ind. Unionist Party	T. Elliot	3,912	34.3	New
Majority		3,596	31.4	N/A
Turnout		11,420	66.1	N/A
UUP hold		Swing	N/A	

At the 1943 by-election and the 1945 Northern Ireland general election, Thomas Lyons was elected unopposed.

General Election 1949: North Tyrone
Party	Candidate	Votes	%	±%
UUP	Thomas Lyons	8,107	54.4	N/A
Nationalist	B. V. McBride	6,728	45.6	New
Majority		1,289	8.8	N/A
Turnout		14,835	86.6	N/A
UUP hold		Swing	N/A	

At the 1953, 1958, and 1962 Northern Ireland general elections, Thomas Lyons was elected unopposed.

General Election 1965: North Tyrone
Party	Candidate	Votes	%	±%
UUP	Thomas Lyons	9,304	74.9	N/A
New Ireland Movement	L. T. O'Kane	3,111	25.1	New
Majority		6,193	48.8	N/A
Turnout		12,415	67.2	N/A
UUP hold		Swing	N/A	

General Election 1969: North Tyrone
Party	Candidate	Votes	%	±%
UUP	William Samuel Fyffe	8,290	53.7	−21.2
National Democratic	D. McLaughlin	6,596	42.7	New
Independent	L. T. O'Kane	559	3.6	−21.5
Majority		1,694	11.0	−37.8
Turnout		15,445	85.7	+18.5
UUP hold		Swing		
