= Northern Ireland Labour Party =

- Founded: 1924
- Dissolved: 1987
- Preceded by: Belfast Labour Party
- Succeeded by: Labour '87; Labour and Trade Union Group
- Ideology: Social democracy; British unionism
- Political position: Centre-left
- Colours: Red

The Northern Ireland Labour Party (NILP) was a political party in Northern Ireland which operated from 1924 until 1987.

== Origins ==
The roots of the NILP can be traced back to the formation of the Belfast Labour Party in 1892. Previously, in 1885, Alexander Bowman had stood in North Belfast as an independent labour candidate, supported by the Belfast Trades Council.

Six Labour candidates were elected to Belfast Corporation in 1897 – the first Labour councillors in Ireland. There continued to be Labour representation on Belfast Corporation up to the 1911 elections when no Labour candidates were returned. The 1920 elections to Belfast Corporation, held in the aftermath of a mass strike wave that gripped Belfast in 1919, saw Labour return with 12 seats after winning over 14% of the vote.

William Walker stood as the Labour candidate in the Belfast North by-election in 1905, coming a close second with 47% of the vote.

When the British Labour Party decided not to contest the 1921 elections to the first Northern Ireland Parliament, local party activists independently stood Belfast Labour candidates.

== After partition ==
After the partition of Ireland in 1921, the NILP was founded as a socialist political party by groups such as the Belfast Labour Party and found its main bed of support amongst working class voters in Belfast. Over 40 delegates attended the founding conference of the Labour Party of Northern Ireland held on 8 March 1924. It initially declined to take a position on the "Border Question" and instead sought to offer itself as an alternative to both nationalism and unionism.

In the 1925 Northern Ireland general election, the party won 6% of the total vote and secured three seats in Belfast, including William McMullen elected in Belfast West, as well as Sam Kyle (Belfast North) and Jack Beattie (Belfast East); this was the last election for the Northern Ireland Parliament using the single transferable vote system.

In 1934, those in the Independent Labour Party who refused a British national directive to disaffiliate from the NILP (in line with the ILP's break with the Labour Party in Britain) formed the Socialist Party of Northern Ireland (SPNI). A mainly Protestant organisation, It had about 150 members in the Shankill and Newtownards Road districts of Belfast, and included Winifred Carney, Jack Macgougan, secretary from 1935 onwards, and Victor Halley.

In 1944, with other Protestant trade unionists in west Belfast, Halley joined Nationalist Party dissidents around Harry Diamond, and ex-IRA volunteers in forming the Socialist Republican Party. He stood for the party at the 1946 Belfast Central by-election for the party, but was defeated by Frank Hanna of the NILP by 5,566 to 2,783 votes.

The NILP had a Westminster Member of Parliament on only one occasion, when Jack Beattie won the 1943 Belfast West by-election, retained the seat in 1945, but lost it in 1950. He regained the seat as an Irish Labour Party candidate in 1951.

In the 1945 election to the Stormont parliament, held in the aftermath of the second world war, the NILP polled 66,503 votes, 18.6% of the total votes cast.

In 1949, following the declaration of a Republic in the south, the Northern Ireland Labour Party's conference voted in favour of the Union with Great Britain. The NILP abandoned its neutral position on the border, adopting a pro-union position that the “Northern Ireland Labour Party will maintain unbroken the connection between Great Britain and Northern Ireland”.

Many anti-partition Labour activists drifted out of the NILP and joined the Irish Labour Party. The result was a sharp decline in the party's already limited electoral success, as Catholic voters deserted, and the Irish Labour Party attempted to organise in Northern Ireland.

An earlier refusal to adopt a pro-union policy had split the party, with leader Harry Midgley forming his own strongly Unionist Commonwealth Labour Party in 1942.

In the 1949 elections to the Stormont Parliament, Labour’s vote fell to 26,831 votes, 7% of the total votes cast. This was a dramatic decline from the 18.5% share of the vote in the 1945 election.

Later in the 1950s, the party began to gain ground amongst unionist voters and, after the breakup of the Irish Labour Party's new attempts to organise in Northern Ireland, among some nationalists. The NILP campaign to highlight the failure of the Unionist Government to respond effectively to the growing problem of unemployment led to the NILP attracting more support form both Protestant and Catholic working class voters. In the 1953 elections to the Stormont Parliament the NILP recovered to a 12% share of the vote.

The NILP saw its greatest period of success between 1958 and 1965. In 1958 the party won nearly 16% of the vote. Four NILP MPs were elected to Stormont for Belfast constituencies: Tom Boyd (Pottinger), Billy Boyd (Woodvale), Vivian Simpson (Oldpark), and David Bleakley (Victoria). The NILP then became the official opposition at Stormont.

In the 1962 Stormont elections the NILP won 76,842 votes, over 25% of the total votes cast. In the 1964 UK General Election the NILP polled 102,759 votes – its highest ever popular vote.

Success came despite continued divisions over such matters as Sunday Observance – two NILP Belfast councillors voted to close the city's park playgrounds on Sundays (as demanded by hard line Calvinists but opposed by Catholics) and were expelled as a result.

During this period the NILP maintained its pro-union stance. Despite this, the NILP was winning support from the Catholic working class who were voting on “bread and butter” issues. Paddy Devlin, previously an Irish Labour councillor, joined the NILP in 1958: “the only party that filled my need was the NILP, which was then going from strength to strength. With active trade union backing it was climbing back into the natural position for a local Labour Party: chief challenger of Unionist Party dominance.”

== Civil rights ==
In the early to mid 1960s, the NILP was a leading voice in the calls for civil rights and an end to discrimination. When the Northern Ireland Civil Rights Association (NICRA) was formed in 1967, NILP members were prominent in the organisation with Paddy Devlin elected to its Executive. But, despite the involvement of many Labour members in the civil rights movement, the NILP felt more comfortable confronting the Unionists at Stormont over civil rights than taking part in the street protests that soon became violent confrontations due to the RUC's brutal enforcement of the state ban on many civil rights marches.

== The Troubles ==
In 1969 the situation in Northern Ireland worsened as the violent response by the RUC and loyalists to the civil rights marches led to the Battle of the Bogside in Derry and sectarian clashes in working class areas of Belfast.

The growing sectarian polarisation in working class areas in the late 1960s damaged the NILP’s project of building a Labour alternative to Unionism. However, even by 1970 the NILP was still able to poll nearly 100,000 votes across Northern Ireland in the UK General Election.

Any hopes of keeping the cross-community Labour coalition together were damaged by the NILP publicly distancing itself from Paddy Devlin’s lobbying for action to protect Catholic working class communities. The NILP expelled Paddy Devlin in August 1970 for his links with civil rights politicians who would go on to form the SDLP. The NILP also expelled Eamonn McCann, who was chairman of Derry Labour Party, for supporting Bernadette Devlin who had recently been elected as an MP.

With the onset of the Troubles, new parties emerged that appealed to the party's support base, including the Social Democratic and Labour Party (SDLP), the Alliance Party of Northern Ireland and the Democratic Unionist Party. Once again the polarisation of politics around partition deprived the party of a critical mass.

== Decline ==
In 1971 the new Prime Minister of Northern Ireland Brian Faulkner appointed NILP former Stormont MP David Bleakley to his Cabinet as Minister of Community Relations, in an attempt to bring reforms to Northern Ireland. However, the following year the Stormont Parliament was suspended when it resisted the London government request to take over responsibility for public order. In the 1973 referendum on the border, the NILP campaigned for Northern Ireland to remain in the United Kingdom.

By 1973 the NILP was in a serious decline with the party only achieving 2.5% of the vote in the local council elections and a similar 2.6% in the Northern Ireland Assembly election. In contrast, Alliance won 13.7% of votes in the local elections and 9.2% in the Assembly elections, and the SDLP achieved its best results so far by polling more than 22% of the votes in the Assembly election. David Bleakley was the only NILP representative elected to the 1973 Assembly and 1975 Forum for East Belfast.

The Northern Ireland Labour Party continued to contest elections but with a dwindling support base. Alan Carr became its leading figure from the mid-1970s until the early 1980s, by which point it had only about 200 members, and just a single councillor was elected for the party in 1981. A party conference in 1983 narrowly failed to secure a necessary two-thirds majority to wind up the party, but it stood no candidates in the 1983 general election, its Chairman and Party Secretary having resigned just beforehand, and by the 1985 Northern Ireland local elections, its three candidates received no support from the central body.

== Labour '87 ==
In March 1987, the remains of the party merged with the Labour Party of Northern Ireland (formed in 1985 by former SDLP leader Paddy Devlin), the Ulster Liberal Party and the United Labour Party to form the Labour '87 group. This group also gained the support of the Newtownabbey Labour Party. They contested local elections and Mark Langhammer contested the 1989 European Elections unsuccessfully.

== Leadership ==
=== Leaders at Stormont ===
- 1925–29: Samuel Kyle
- 1929–33: Jack Beattie
- 1933–38: Harry Midgley
- 1938–42: Paddy Agnew
- 1942–43: Jack Beattie
- 1943–45: Paddy Agnew
- 1945–49: Hugh Downey
- 1949–50: William James Smyth
- 1958–69: Tom Boyd
- 1969–73: Vivian Simpson

=== Chairs ===
1924: Sam Kyle
1925: William McMullen
1927: Matthew Courtney
1931: Hugh Gemmell
1932: Harry Midgley
1942: Jack Beattie
1943:
1944: William Leeburn
1945: Jack Macgougan
1946: John Boyle
1947: Robert Getgood
1947: Henry Holmes
1948: James Morrow
1950:
1952: Vivian Simpson
1953: Tom Boyd
1954: Cecil Allen
1955: Saidie Patterson
1956: W. Blair
1957: David Bleakley
1958: Andrew Gibson
1959: Robert Bingham
1960: Billy Boyd
1961:
1962: Charles Brett
1963: Hugh Waring
1964: Edward Wright
1965: William Gunning
1966: Martin McBirney
1967: Paddy Devlin
1969: Robert Allen
1970: Brian Anderson
1971: Erskine Holmes
1972: Brian Garrett
1973: Archie McArdle
1973: Brian Garrett
1974: Jack Barkley
1975: George Chambers
1976: Sandy Scott
1977: Alan Carr
1980: Ciaran McAteer
1981: Bob Clarke
1983: William Gunning

== Electoral performance ==
=== Stormont ===
Election	Body	Votes	Vote %	Seats	Outcome
1921	1st Parliament	3,075	0.6%	0 / 52	—N/a
1925	2nd Parliament	18,114	4.7%	3 / 52	Opposition
1929	3rd Parliament	23,334	8.0%	1 / 52	Opposition
1933	4th Parliament	14,436	8.5%	2 / 52	Opposition
1938	5th Parliament	18,775	5.7%	1 / 52	Opposition
1945	6th Parliament	66,053	18.5%	2 / 52	Opposition
1949	7th Parliament	26,831	7.1%	0 / 52	—N/a
1953	8th Parliament	31,360	12.1%	0 / 52	—N/a
1958	9th Parliament	38,093	15.8%	4 / 52	Opposition
1962	10th Parliament	76,842	25.4%	4 / 52	Opposition
1965	11th Parliament	66,323	20.4%	2 / 52	Opposition
1969	12th Parliament	45,113	8.1%	2 / 52	Opposition
1973	1973 Assembly	18,675	2.6%	1 / 78	Opposition
1975	Constitutional Convention	9,102	1.4%	1 / 78	—N/a

=== Local government ===
Election	First Preference Vote	Vote %	Seats
1973	17,422	2.5%	4 / 517
1977	4,960	0.8%	1 / 526
1981	3,563	0.5%	1 / 526
1985	1,285	0.2%	1 / 565
