= George Leeke =

George Leeke (2 April 1881 – 30 March 1939) was an Irish nationalist politician.

George Leeke was born in Magilligan, son of George Leeke (merchant) and Mary Lurting. Educated at St Columb's College, Leeke owned a hotel and fishery. He was elected to Londonderry County Council for the Nationalist Party. At the 1921 Northern Ireland general election, Leeke was elected in the Londonderry seat, although he did not take his seat until 1926. In 1929 his seat was abolished, and he instead won the Mid Londonderry seat, which he held until his death in 1939. He was active in the Ancient Order of Hibernians.

Parliament of Northern Ireland
New constituency	Member of Parliament for Mid Londonderry; 1929–1939	Succeeded by Eddie McAteer
