= Arthur Griffith =

Irish politician and writer, founder of Sinn Féin (1871–1922)

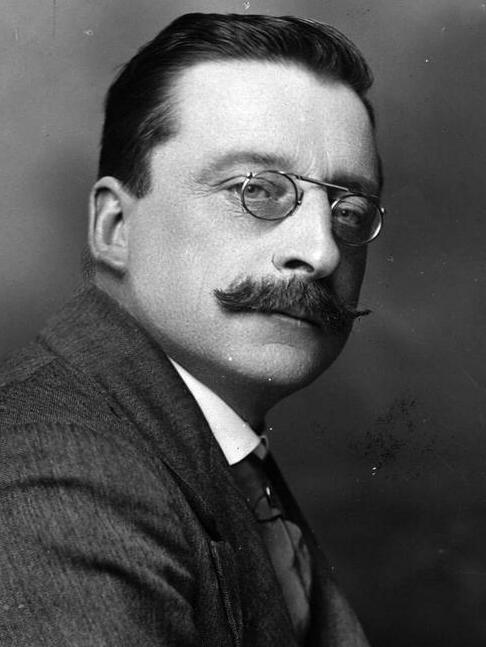
- Griffith, c.1920s

President of Dáil Éireann
- In office 10 January 1922 – 12 August 1922
- Preceded by: Éamon de Valera (as President of the Irish Republic)
- Succeeded by: W. T. Cosgrave

Minister for Foreign Affairs
- In office 26 July 1922 – 12 August 1922
- President: Michael Collins
- Preceded by: George Gavan Duffy
- Succeeded by: Michael Hayes
- In office 26 August 1921 – 9 January 1922
- President: Éamon de Valera
- Preceded by: George Noble Plunkett
- Succeeded by: George Gavan Duffy

Minister for Home Affairs
- In office 2 April 1919 – 12 August 1921
- President: Éamon de Valera
- Preceded by: Michael Collins
- Succeeded by: Austin Stack

Vice President of Sinn Féin
- In office 6 June 1917 – 9 January 1922
- President: Éamon de Valera
- Preceded by: Thomas Kelly
- Succeeded by: P. J. Ruttledge
- In office 20 May 1905 – 11 January 1911
- President: Edward Martyn
- Preceded by: New office
- Succeeded by: Jennie Wyse Power

President of Sinn Féin
- In office 11 January 1911 – 25 October 1917
- Deputy: Jennie Wyse Power; Thomas Kelly
- Preceded by: John Sweetman
- Succeeded by: Éamon de Valera

Teachta Dála
- In office May 1921 – 12 August 1922
- Constituency: Cavan
- In office June 1918 – May 1921
- Constituency: Cavan East

Member of Parliament
- In office 14 December 1918 – 12 August 1922
- Preceded by: New office
- Succeeded by: Vacant, then constituency abolished
- Constituency: North West Tyrone
- In office 20 June 1918 – 12 August 1922
- Preceded by: Samuel Young
- Succeeded by: Vacant, then constituency abolished
- Constituency: East Cavan

Member of the Northern Ireland Parliament
- In office 24 May 1921 – 12 August 1922
- Preceded by: New office
- Succeeded by: Edward Archdale
- Constituency: Fermanagh and Tyrone

Personal details
- Born: 31 March 1871 Dublin, Ireland
- Died: 12 August 1922 (aged 51) Dublin, Ireland
- Cause of death: Intracerebral hemorrhage and heart failure
- Resting place: Glasnevin Cemetery, Dublin, Ireland
- Party: Sinn Féin
- Spouse: Maud Sheehan (m. 1910)
- Children: 2

Arthur Joseph Griffith (Irish: Art Seosamh Ó Gríobhtha or Art Ó Gríofa; 31 March 1871 – 12 August 1922) was an Irish writer, newspaper editor and politician who founded the political party Sinn Féin. He led the Irish delegation at the negotiations that produced the 1921 Anglo-Irish Treaty, and served as the president of Dáil Éireann from January 1922 until his death that August.

After a short spell in South Africa, Griffith founded and edited the Irish nationalist newspaper The United Irishman in 1899. In 1904, he wrote The Resurrection of Hungary, which advocated the withdrawal of Irish members from the Parliament of the United Kingdom and the setting up of the institutions of government at home in Ireland, a policy that became known as Sinn Féin (ourselves). On 28 November 1905, he presented "The Sinn Féin Policy" at the first annual convention of his organisation, the National Council; the occasion is marked as the founding date of the Sinn Féin party. Griffith took over as president of Sinn Féin in 1911, but at that time the organisation was still small.

Griffith was arrested following the Easter Rising of 1916, despite not having taken any part in it. On his release, he worked to build up Sinn Féin, which won a string of by-election victories. At the party's Ardfheis (annual convention) in October 1917, Sinn Féin became an unambiguously republican party, and Griffith resigned the presidency in favour of the 1916 leader Éamon de Valera, becoming vice-president instead. Griffith was elected as an MP for East Cavan in a by-election in June 1918, and re-elected in the 1918 general election, when Sinn Féin won a huge electoral victory over the Irish Parliamentary Party and, refusing to take their seats at Westminster, set up their own constituent assembly, Dáil Éireann.

In the Dáil, Griffith served as Minister for Home Affairs from 1919 to 1921, and Minister for Foreign Affairs from 1921 to 1922. In September 1921, he was appointed chairman of the Irish delegation to negotiate a treaty with the British government. After months of negotiations, he and the other four delegates signed the Anglo-Irish Treaty, which created the Irish Free State, but not as a republic. This led to a split in the Dáil. After the Treaty was narrowly approved by the Dáil, de Valera resigned as president and Griffith was elected in his place. The split led to the Irish Civil War. Griffith died suddenly in August 1922, two months after the outbreak of that war.

== Family and early life ==
Arthur Joseph Griffith was born at 61 Upper Dominick Street, Dublin on 31 March 1871, of distant Welsh lineage. His great-great-grandfather, William Griffith of Drws-y-coed Uchaf, Rhyd-ddu, Caernarfonshire (1719–1782), was a farmer and supporter of the Moravian Church cause. His great-grandfather, Griffith Griffith (b. 1789), emigrated first to the United States and then to Ireland, where some of his sisters had settled in Dublin among the Moravian community there. A Roman Catholic, Griffith was educated by the Irish Christian Brothers. He worked for a time as a printer before joining the Gaelic League, which was aimed at promoting the restoration of the Irish language.

His father had been a printer on The Nation newspaper — Griffith was one of several employees locked out in the early 1890s due to a dispute with a new owner of the paper. The young Griffith was a member of the Irish Republican Brotherhood (IRB). Later in life he came to feel that violence would not be the best way to achieve the independence of Ireland. He felt that passive resistance was the safer and more certain way of defeating the British. He initially supported Parnell's political views but then decided that Parnell's political outlook was not what he thought was best for Ireland. Griffith visited South Africa from 1896 to 1898. In South Africa, Griffith supported the Boers in their campaign against British expansionism and was a supporter of Paul Kruger.

In 1899, on returning to Dublin, Griffith co-founded the weekly United Irishman newspaper with his associate William Rooney, who died in 1901. On 24 November 1910, Griffith married Maud Sheehan, after a six-year engagement; they had a son and a daughter.

Griffith's fierce criticism of the Irish Parliamentary Party's alliance with the British Liberal Party was heavily influenced by the anti-Liberal rhetoric of Young Irelander John Mitchel. Griffith supported the Limerick boycott, advocating shunning Jewish-owned businesses in the city. Griffith also supported movements seeking national independence from the British Empire in Egypt and India, and wrote a highly-critical description of the British government action at Matabele. He opposed the policies of James Larkin, but worked with James Connolly, who was a nationalist as well as a socialist.

In September 1900, he established an organisation called Cumann na nGaedheal ("Society of the Gaels"), to unite advanced nationalist and separatist groups and clubs. In 1903, he set up the National Council, to campaign against the visit to Ireland of Edward VII and his consort Alexandra of Denmark. In 1907, that organisation merged with the Sinn Féin League, which itself had been formed from an amalgamation of Cumann na nGaedheal and the Dungannon Clubs, to form what would become Sinn Féin.

In 1906, after the United Irishman journal collapsed because of a libel suit, Griffith re-founded it under the title Sinn Féin (1906–14). It briefly became a daily in 1909 and survived until its suppression by the British government in 1914, after which Griffith became editor of the new nationalist journal, Nationality (1915–22).

== Foundation of Sinn Féin ==
Most historians opt for 28 November 1905 as a founding date because it was on this date that Griffith first presented his 'Sinn Féin Policy'. In his writings, Griffith declared that the Act of Union of Great Britain and Ireland in 1800 was illegal and that, consequently, the Anglo-Irish dual monarchy that existed under Grattan's Parliament and the so-called Constitution of 1782 were still in effect. Its first president was Edward Martyn.

The fundamental principles of abstentionism on which Sinn Féin was founded were outlined in an article published in 1904, by Griffith called The Resurrection of Hungary, in which, notes how in 1867 Hungary went from being part of the Austrian Empire to a separate co-equal kingdom in Austria-Hungary. Though not a monarchist himself, Griffith advocated such an approach for the Anglo-Irish relationship, namely that Ireland should become a separate kingdom alongside Great Britain, the two forming a dual monarchy with a shared monarch but separate governments, as it was thought this solution would be more palatable to the British. This was similar to the policy of Henry Grattan a century earlier. However, this idea was never really embraced by later separatist leaders, especially Michael Collins, and never came to anything, although Kevin O'Higgins toyed with the idea as a means of ending partition, shortly before his assassination in 1927.

Griffith sought to combine elements of Parnellism with the traditional separatist approach; he saw himself not as a leader but as providing a strategy which a new leader might follow. Central to his strategy was parliamentary abstention: the belief that Irish MPs should refuse to attend the Parliament of the United Kingdom at Westminster, but should instead establish a separate Irish parliament (with an administrative system based on local government) in Dublin.

Griffith was a staunch economic nationalist, he argued that nationalism was central to the fostering of economic growth. He often cited the works of German economist Friedrich List.

In February 1908, Sinn Féin unsuccessfully contested a by-election in North Leitrim, where the sitting MP, one Charles Dolan of Manorhamilton, County Leitrim, had defected to Sinn Féin. At this time Sinn Féin was being infiltrated by the Irish Republican Brotherhood, who saw it as a vehicle for their aims; it had several local Councillors (mostly in Dublin, including W. T. Cosgrave) and contained a dissident wing grouped from 1910 around the monthly periodical called Irish Freedom. The IRB members argued that the aim of dual monarchism should be replaced by republicanism and that Griffith was excessively inclined to compromise with conservative elements (notably in his pro-employer position during the 1913–1914 Dublin Lockout when he saw the syndicalism of James Larkin as aimed at crippling Irish industry for Great Britain's benefit).

In 1911, he helped to found the Proportional Representation Society of Ireland, believing that proportional representation would help to prevent animosity between unionists and nationalists in an independent Ireland.

== 1916 Rising ==
In 1916, rebels seized and took over a number of key locations in Dublin, in what became known as the Easter Rising. After its defeat, it was widely described both by British politicians and the Irish and British media as the "Sinn Féin rebellion", even though Sinn Féin had very limited involvement. Griffith himself had believed he would be kept informed but had been left minding his young children on the first day of the Rising. One day after the rebellion began Griffith cycled across Dublin and met with the leader of the Irish Volunteers, Eoin MacNeill asking him (unsuccessfully) to mobilize the Volunteers across the nation. Griffith was detained, being released from Reading Gaol at the end of 1916. When in 1917, surviving leaders of the rebellion were released from jail (or escaped) they joined Sinn Féin en masse, using it as a vehicle for the advancement of the republic. The result was a bitter clash between those original members who backed Griffith's concept of an Anglo-Irish dual monarchy and the new members, under Éamon de Valera, who wanted to achieve a republic. Matters almost led to a split at the party's Ard Fheis (conference) in October 1917.

In a compromise, it was decided to seek to establish a republic initially, then allow the people to decide whether they wanted a republic or a monarchy, subject to the condition that no member of Britain's royal house could sit on any prospective Irish throne. At that Ard Fheis, Griffith resigned the presidency of Sinn Féin in favour of de Valera; he and Fr. Michael O'Flanagan were elected vice-presidents. The leaders of the Irish Parliamentary Party (IPP) sought a rapprochement with Griffith over the British threat of conscription, which both parties condemned, but Griffith refused unless the IPP embraced his more radical and subversive ideals, a suggestion which John Dillon, a leader of the IPP rubbished as unrealistic, although it would ultimately mean the defeat and dissolution of the IPP after the election in December 1918.

== War of Independence ==
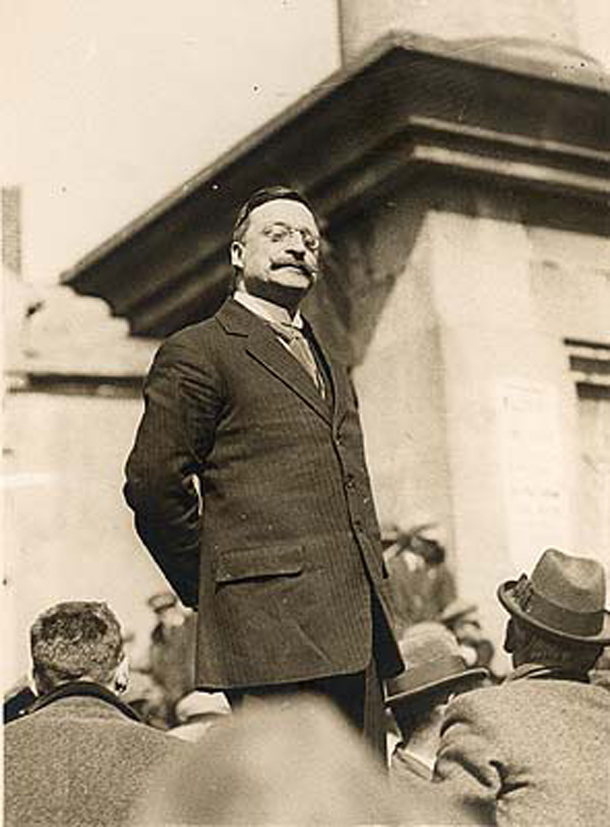
Griffith seen in July 1922, a month before his death

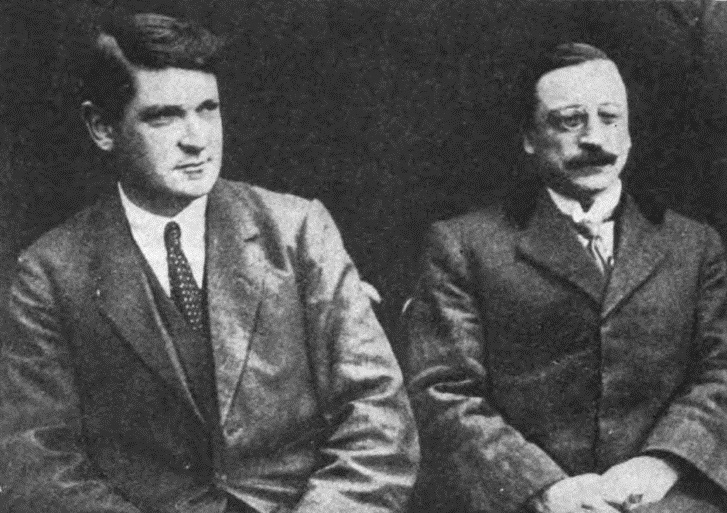
Michael Collins with Arthur Griffith

In May 1918, along with Éamon de Valera and 72 other Sinn Féiners, Griffith was arrested on the pretext of involvement in the fictitious German Plot. Griffith spent ten months interned in HM Prison Gloucester, being released on 6 March 1919. Fr. O'Flanagan was left as Acting-President of Sinn Féin. Griffith was put forward as a Sinn Féin candidate for the East Cavan by-election on 20 June 1918. Under the slogan "Put him in to get him out," and was elected. and held the seat when Sinn Féin subsequently routed the Irish Parliamentary Party at the 1918 general election with a commitment of abstentionism from the British House of Commons. Griffith was returned for both East Cavan and Tyrone North West.

Sinn Féin set up an Irish parliament, Dáil Éireann and declared independence for the Irish Republic; the Irish War of Independence followed almost immediately. The dominant leaders in the Dáil included Éamon de Valera, President of Dáil Éireann (1919–21), President of the Republic (1921–1922), and Michael Collins, Minister for Finance, head of the IRB and the Irish Republican Army's Director of Intelligence.

During de Valera's absence in the United States (1919–21) Griffith served as Acting President and gave regular press interviews. He was arrested at his house at 3 am, on 26 November 1920, and later jailed, Fr. O'Flanagan again taking over as acting leader until de Valera returned from America on 23 December. Griffith was to spend the next seven months in Dublin's Mountjoy Prison. He was released on 30 June 1921 as peace moves got underway.

In Ireland, a general election was held on 24 May 1921 and Griffith, while still in prison, headed the poll in the contested constituency of Fermanagh and Tyrone, and was returned unopposed for Cavan. On 26 August 1921, Griffith was appointed Minister for Foreign Affairs in the new Irish cabinet.

== Treaty negotiations and death ==
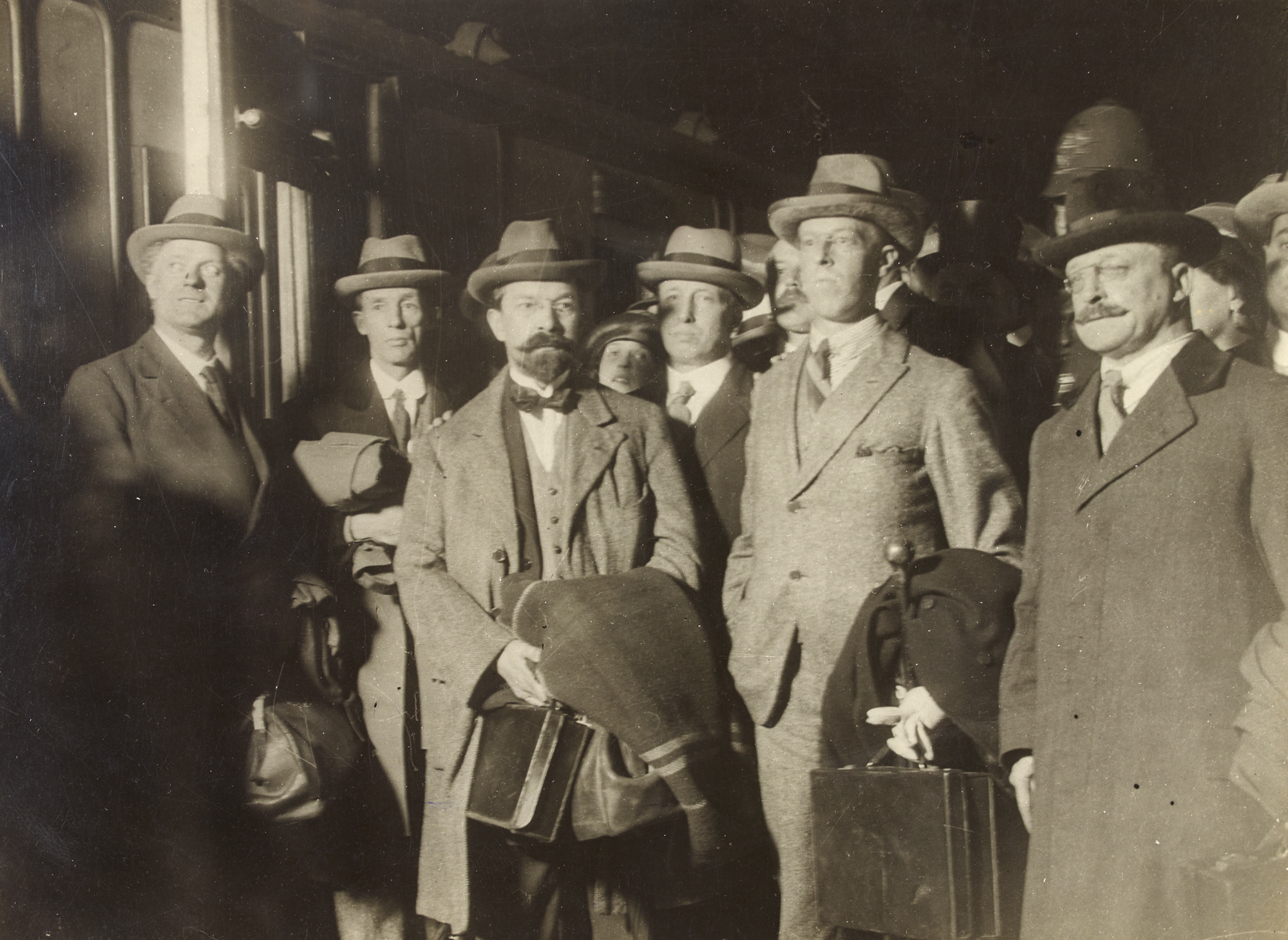
Arthur Griffith and three of the four other members of the Irish delegation (George Gavan Duffy, Erskine Childers and Robert Barton) for the Anglo-Irish Treaty negotiations in 1921

In September 1921, de Valera, President of the Republic, asked Griffith to head the delegation of Irish plenipotentiaries to negotiate with the British government. The delegates set up Headquarters in Hans Place, London. After nearly two months of negotiations, on 5 December, the delegates decided in a private conversation in their headquarters to sign the Treaty and recommended it to the Dáil; negotiations closed at 2.20 a.m. on 6 December 1921. Griffith was the member of the treaty delegation most supportive of its eventual outcome, a compromise based on dominion status, rather than a republic. Griffith was content for an independent Irish State to remain within the British Empire or British Commonwealth as it soon would become. The Treaty was ratified by the Dáil by 64 votes to 57 on 7 January 1922. On 9 January, de Valera stood down as president and sought re-election by the Dáil, which he lost by a vote of 60 to 58. Griffith then succeeded de Valera as President of Dáil Éireann. A second ratification of the Treaty by the House of Commons of Southern Ireland followed shortly afterwards.

Suffering from overwork and strain after the long and difficult negotiations with the British government (Griffith attended 41 of the 42 provisional government meetings held between 23 June and 30 July), and the work involved in establishing the Free State government, he entered St. Vincent's Nursing Home, Leeson Street, Dublin, during the first week of August 1922, following an acute attack of tonsillitis. He was confined to a room in St Vincent's by his doctors, who had observed signs of what they thought might be a subarachnoid haemorrhage, but it was difficult to keep him quiet, and he resumed his daily work in the government building. He had been about to leave for his office shortly before 10 a.m. on 12 August 1922, when he paused to retie his shoelace and fell down unconscious. He regained consciousness but collapsed again with blood coming from his mouth. Three doctors rendered assistance but to no avail. Fr John Lee of the Marist Fathers administered extreme unction, and Griffith died as the priest recited the concluding prayer. The cause of death, cerebral haemorrhage, was also reported as being due to heart failure. He died at the age of 51, ten days before Michael Collins' death in an ambush in County Cork. He was buried in Glasnevin Cemetery four days later.

== Posthumous commemoration ==
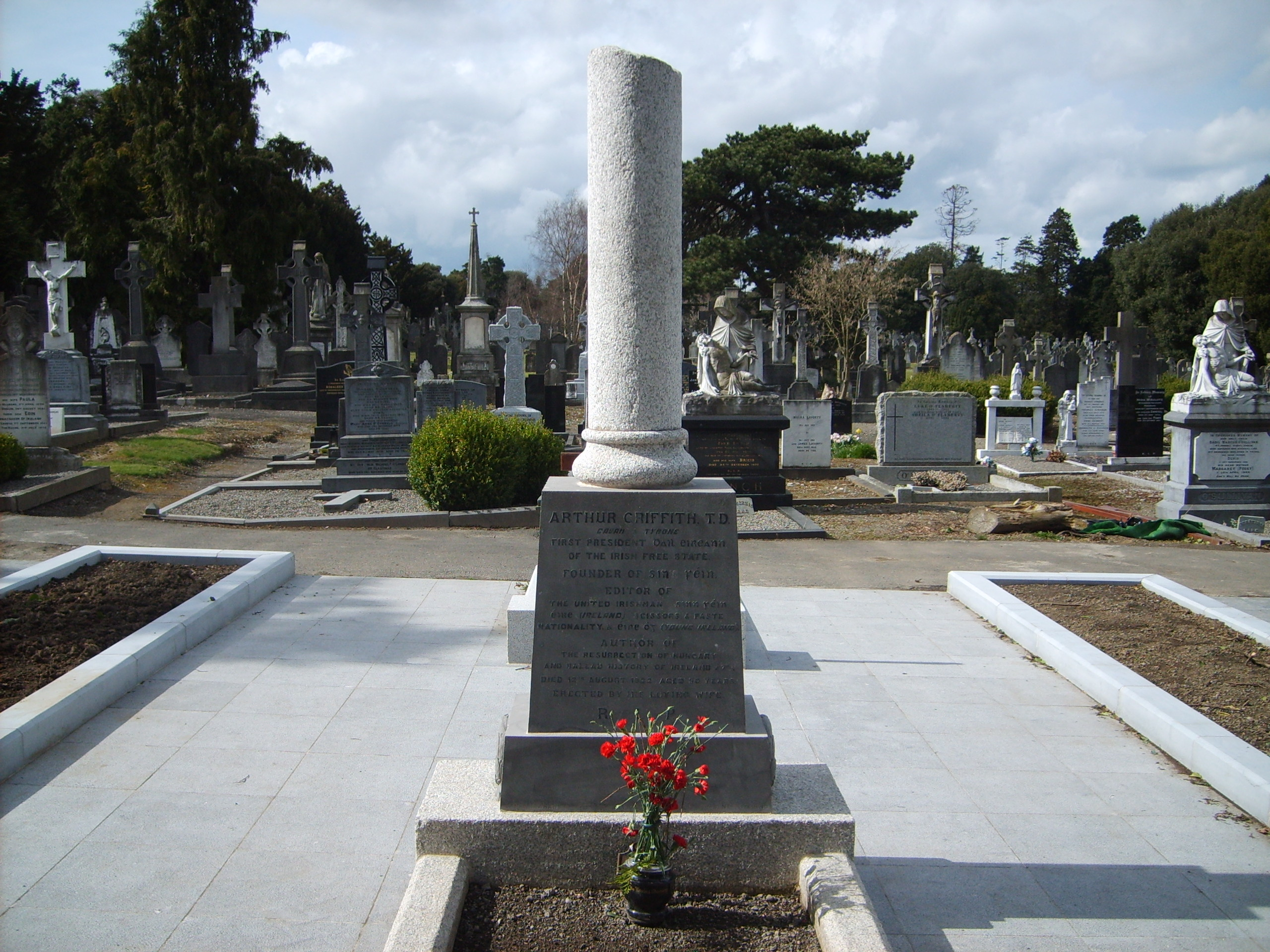
Griffith's grave in Glasnevin Cemetery, Dublin

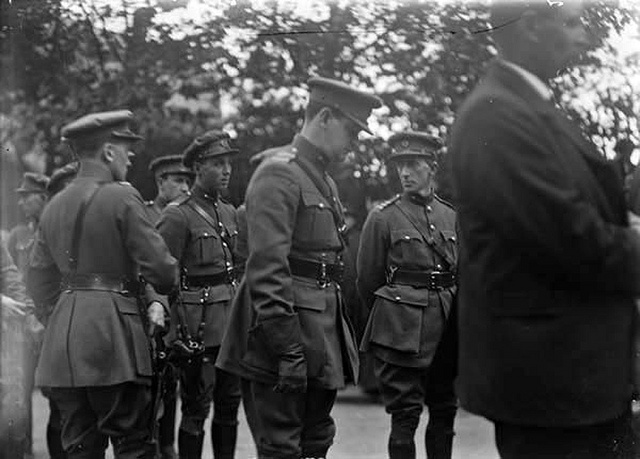
Richard Mulcahy and Michael Collins at Arthur Griffith's funeral

The historian Diarmaid Ferriter considers that, though he had founded Sinn Féin, Griffith was 'quickly airbrushed' from Irish history. His widow had to beg his former colleagues for a pension, saying that he 'had made them all'. She considered that his grave plot was too modest and threatened to exhume his body. Only in 1968 was a plaque fixed on his former Clontarf home on St Lawrence Road.

Griffith Barracks which is now Griffith College Dublin on South Circular Road, Dublin, Griffith Avenue in North Dublin, Griffith Park in Drumcondra and Arthur Griffith Park in Lucan, Dublin are named after him. An obelisk erected in 1950 in the grounds of Leinster House commemorates Griffith, as well as Michael Collins and Kevin O'Higgins.

== Views on race ==
=== Views on Jews ===
As editor of the United Irishman, Griffith took an "Anti-Dreyfusard" line, writing in 1899 to defend the conviction of "the Jew traitor" Dreyfus; accusing the Dublin press of being "almost all Jew rags"; and decrying

Fifty other rags like those which have nothing behind them but the forty or fifty thousand Jewish usurers and pick-pockets in each country and which no decent Christian ever reads except holding his nose as a precaution against nausea.

Other editorials in Griffith's United Irishman that year expressed concern about a conspiracy where "the Jew capitalist has got a grip on the lying "Press of Civilization" from Vienna to New York and further", and concluded "we know that all Jews are pretty sure to be traitors if they get the chance." In late 1899 The United Irishman published an article by Griffith that stated: "I have in former years often declared that the Three Evil Influences of the century were the Pirate, the Freemason, and the Jew." The antisemitism found in the pages of The United Irishman during Griffth's editorial tenure has been credited with shaping various aspects of Joyce's Ulysses, especially in the "Cyclops" episode.

In 1904, a piece in the paper voiced support for the Limerick boycott, a boycott of Jewish businesses in Limerick organised by a local priest, declaring that

the Jew in Limerick has not been boycotted because he is a Jew, but because he is a usurer" and that "If Jews —as Jews— were boycotted, it would be outrageously unjust.

Griffith was apparently unaware that the Jews of Limerick had little or no involvement in moneylending or similar practices. The United Irishman also published articles by Oliver St. John Gogarty that contained antisemitic sentiments, which were common in the Ireland of the time.

During this time an article in The United Irishman also expressed positive views towards Zionism; while

The Jews of Great Britain and Ireland have united, as is their wont, to crush the Christian who dares to block their path or to point them out for what they are — nine-tenths of them— usurers and parasites of industry.

and excluded from this criticism was

the Zionist minority of the Jews, who include those honest and patriotic Jews who desire the reestablishment of the Hebrew nation in Palestine.

According to his biographer, Brian Maye, Griffith was "a firm supporter of the Zionist claim for a national homeland." From 1904 until his death, Griffith wrote virtually nothing which could be construed as antisemitic. Historian Colum Kenny writes that Griffith's "thinking developed" which is shown by a "radical shift" in his journalism. Already in 1903, he had endorsed the Temperance–Labour Councillor Albert L. Altman, a Jew, for election to Dublin Corporation. In 1909, he wrote a favourable article in Sinn Féin on the Jewish contribution to European civilisation, and in Nationality in 1915, he railed against the Irish Parliamentary Party for saying that Jews should be barred from public office. Griffith's publication 'Scissors and Paste' published three separate articles sympathetic to Jewish victims of Eastern European pogroms and in 1915 his 'Nationality' published a piece which defended English Jew Matthew Nathan - "We do not know of one Nationalist Irishman who objects to Sir Matthew Nathan because of the religion he professes, or who holds the creed that an Irish Jew should be ineligible for any office he was competent to fill in an Irish government".

Griffith was a close friend of Jewish solicitor Michael Noyk, who defended many IRA members in courts martial during the Irish War of Independence, and served as an official in the First Dáil Department of Finance and as a Dáil Court judge during the war. Other Jewish friends included Dr Edward Lipman, Jacob Elyan and Dr Bethel Solomons. Noyk and Solomons were among a group of friends who purchased a house for Griffith when he married.

=== Views on other races ===
Griffith held racist views towards Black people; in a preface he authored for the 1913 edition of John Mitchel's Jail Journal, Griffith argued that "no excuses were needed for an Irish Nationalist declining to hold the Negro his peer in right".

However while in South Africa, he opposed the exploitation of blacks by whites and he expressed appreciation that the Russo-Japanese War which led to a Russian defeat had destroyed "the prestige of the white face" in India. Meanwhile, Griffith's newspapers, United Irishman and Sinn Féin, both produced sympathetic coverage of Indian nationalists. Griffith was particularly interested in India's Swadeshi movement.

Parliament of the United Kingdom
Preceded by Samuel Young	Member of Parliament for East Cavan; 1918–1922	Constituency abolished
New constituency	Member of Parliament for North West Tyrone; 1918–1922	Constituency abolished
Parliament of Northern Ireland
New parliament	Member of Parliament for Fermanagh and Tyrone; 1921–1922; With: Edward Archdale 1921–1929; William Coote 1921–1924; Seán Milroy 1921–1925; William Thomas Miller 1921–1929; James Cooper 1921–1929; Seán O'Mahony 1921–1925; Thomas Harbison 1921–1929	Succeeded by Edward Archdale; William Coote; Seán Milroy; William Thomas Miller; James Cooper; Seán O'Mahony; Thomas Harbison
Oireachtas
New constituency	Teachta Dála for East Cavan; 1918–1921	Constituency abolished
New constituency	Teachta Dála for North West Tyrone; 1918–1921	Constituency abolished
New constituency	Teachta Dála for Fermanagh and Tyrone; 1921–1922	Death in 1922
Political offices
Preceded by Michael Collins	Minister for Home Affairs; 1919–1921	Succeeded by Frank Aiken
Preceded by Count Plunkett	Minister for Foreign Affairs; 1921–Jan 1922	Succeeded by George Gavan Duffy
Preceded by George Gavan Duffy	Minister for Foreign Affairs; Jul 1922– Aug 1922	Succeeded by Michael Hayes
Preceded by Éamon de Valera	President of Dáil Éireann; 1922	Succeeded by W. T. Cosgrave
Party political offices
New post	Vice President of Sinn Féin; 1905–1908 with John Sweetman (1905–1907) with Bulmer Hobson (1907–1908)	Succeeded by Bulmer Hobson
Preceded by John Sweetman	President of Sinn Féin; 1911–1917	Succeeded by Éamon de Valera
Preceded by ? Thomas Kelly	Vice President of Sinn Féin; 1917–1922 with Michael O'Flanagan	Succeeded by Michael O'Flanagan

Dáil	Election	Deputy (Party)	Deputy (Party)	Deputy (Party)	Deputy (Party)
2nd	1921	Arthur Griffith (SF)	Paul Galligan (SF)	Seán Milroy (SF)	3 seats 1921–1923
3rd	1922	Arthur Griffith (PT-SF)	Walter L. Cole (PT-SF)	Seán Milroy (PT-SF)	3 seats 1921–1923
4th	1923	Patrick Smith (Rep)	John James Cole (Ind.)	Seán Milroy (CnaG)	Patrick Baxter (FP)
4th	1925 by-election	Patrick Smith (Rep)	John James Cole (Ind.)	John Joe O'Reilly (CnaG)	Patrick Baxter (FP)
5th	1927 (Jun)	Patrick Smith (FF)	John O'Hanlon (Ind.)	John Joe O'Reilly (CnaG)	Patrick Baxter (FP)
6th	1927 (Sep)	Patrick Smith (FF)	John O'Hanlon (Ind.)	John Joe O'Reilly (CnaG)	John James Cole (Ind.)
7th	1932	Patrick Smith (FF)	John O'Hanlon (Ind.)	John Joe O'Reilly (CnaG)	Michael Sheridan (FF)
8th	1933	Patrick Smith (FF)	Patrick McGovern (NCP)	John Joe O'Reilly (CnaG)	Michael Sheridan (FF)
9th	1937	Patrick Smith (FF)	Patrick McGovern (FG)	John James Cole (Ind.)	Michael Sheridan (FF)
10th	1938	Patrick Smith (FF)	Patrick McGovern (FG)	John James Cole (Ind.)	Michael Sheridan (FF)
11th	1943	Patrick Smith (FF)	Patrick O'Reilly (CnaT)	John James Cole (Ind.)	Michael Sheridan (FF)
12th	1944	Patrick Smith (FF)	Patrick O'Reilly (CnaT)	Tom O'Reilly (Ind.)	Michael Sheridan (FF)
13th	1948	Patrick Smith (FF)	John Tully (CnaP)	Patrick O'Reilly (Ind.)	Michael Sheridan (FF)
14th	1951	Patrick Smith (FF)	John Tully (CnaP)	Patrick O'Reilly (FG)	Michael Sheridan (FF)
15th	1954	Patrick Smith (FF)	John Tully (CnaP)	Patrick O'Reilly (FG)	Michael Sheridan (FF)
16th	1957	Patrick Smith (FF)	John Tully (CnaP)	Patrick O'Reilly (FG)	Michael Sheridan (FF)
17th	1961	Patrick Smith (FF)	Séamus Dolan (FF)	Patrick O'Reilly (FG)	3 seats 1961–1977
18th	1965	Patrick Smith (FF)	John Tully (CnaP)	Tom Fitzpatrick (FG)	3 seats 1961–1977
19th	1969	Patrick Smith (FF)	Patrick O'Reilly (FG)	Tom Fitzpatrick (FG)	3 seats 1961–1977
20th	1973	Patrick Smith (FF)	John Wilson (FF)	Tom Fitzpatrick (FG)	3 seats 1961–1977
21st	1977	Constituency abolished. See Cavan–Monaghan			
