= William Coote =

Irish politician (1863–1924)

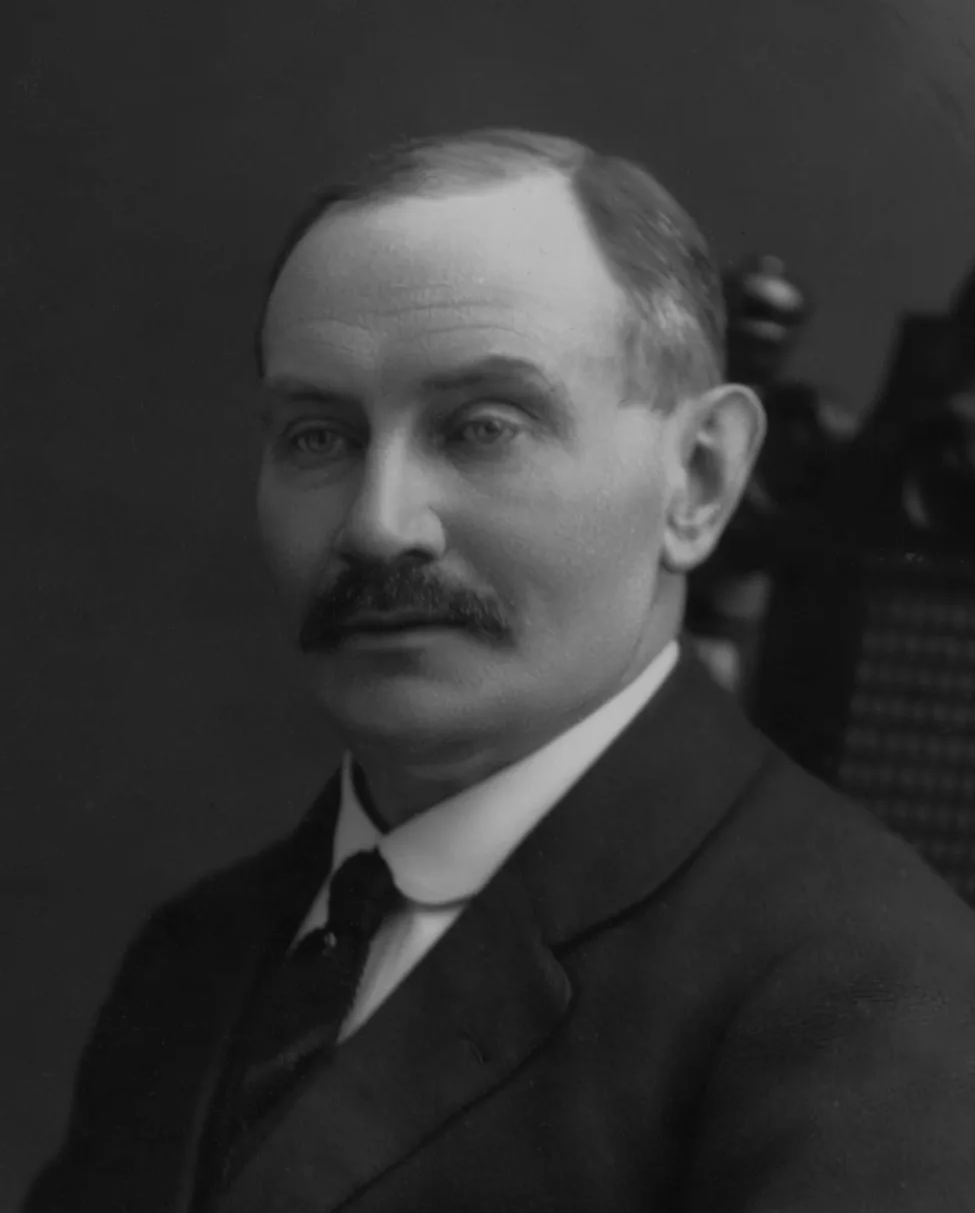
- Coote in 1918

Member of the Northern Ireland Parliament for Fermanagh and Tyrone
- In office 1921–1924
- Preceded by: Constituency established
- Succeeded by: Multi-member constituency

Member of Parliament for South Tyrone
- In office 28 February 1916 – 26 October 1922
- Preceded by: Andrew Horner
- Succeeded by: Constituency abolished

Personal details
- Born: 1863
- Died: 14 December 1924 (aged 60–61)
- Party: Irish Unionist

William Coote (1863 – 14 December 1924) was an Irish Unionist politician. He was elected unopposed as Member of Parliament for South Tyrone at the February 1916 by-election caused by the death of the incumbent Andrew Horner. He was re-elected at the 1918 general election and served until the constituency was abolished in 1922.

In 1921, he was elected to House of Commons of Northern Ireland for the constituency of Fermanagh and Tyrone. He died in 1924 and his seat remained vacant at dissolution.

Parliament of the United Kingdom
Preceded by Andrew Horner	Member of Parliament for South Tyrone; 1916–1922	Constituency abolished
Parliament of Northern Ireland
New parliament	Member of Parliament for Fermanagh and Tyrone; 1921–1924; With: Arthur Griffith 1921–1922; Edward Archdale 1921–1929; Seán Milroy 1921–1925; William Thomas Miller 1921–1929; James Cooper 1921–1929; Seán O'Mahony 1921–1925; Thomas Harbison 1921–1929	Succeeded by Edward Archdale 1921–1929; Seán Milroy 1921–1925; William Thomas Miller 1921–1929; James Cooper 1921–1929; Seán O'Mahony 1921–1925; Thomas Harbison 1921–1929
