= House of Commons (Method of Voting and Redistribution of Seats) Act (Northern Ireland) 1929 =

- Act of Parliament
- Parliament of Northern Ireland
- Long title: An Act to amend the law with respect to the method of voting at Elections of Members to serve in the Parliament of Northern Ireland, and to provide for the Redistribution of Seats at such Elections, and for other purposes connected therewith.
- Citation: 19 Geo. 5. c. 5 (N.I.)
- Territorial extent: Northern Ireland

Dates
- Royal assent: 16 April 1929

Text of statute as originally enacted

The House of Commons (Method of Voting and Redistribution of Seats) Act (Northern Ireland) 1929 (19 Geo. 5. c. 5 (N.I.)) was an act of the Parliament of Northern Ireland at Stormont which changed the usual voting system used for the House of Commons of Northern Ireland from single transferable vote (STV) to first past the post (FPTP). (Note: Stormont by-elections had always used FPTP rather than STV or its single-winner analogue, the alternative vote.) As a consequence, the act also subdivided nine of the ten multiple-seat constituencies established by the Government of Ireland Act 1920 into 48 single-seat constituencies. The only exception was the Queen's University constituency, which remained STV under a plural voting system until its 1969 abolition. (Note: Similarly, university constituencies in the Westminster House of Commons used STV until their 1950 abolition.) The act was passed in time for the 1929 Stormont election.

The 1929 act has been interpreted by Irish nationalists, at the time and in later years, as an attempt by the Ulster Unionist Party (UUP) to reduce nationalist representation. Dennis Pringle argues that, although gerrymandering and malapportionment at local government level was intended to strengthen Ulster unionist candidates at the expense of nationalism, this was not the case at Stormont, where the unionist majority was secure; instead, the Craigavon ministry's concern was to defend the middle-class UUP against working-class independent unionists and the Northern Ireland Labour Party. According to the Craigavon ministry, the change in electoral system was intended to mimic Westminster. These lost more seats than the nationalists at the 1929 election because their support was more evenly spread than the nationalist and unionist parties.
