= Seán Milroy =

Irish revolutionary and politician (1877–1946)

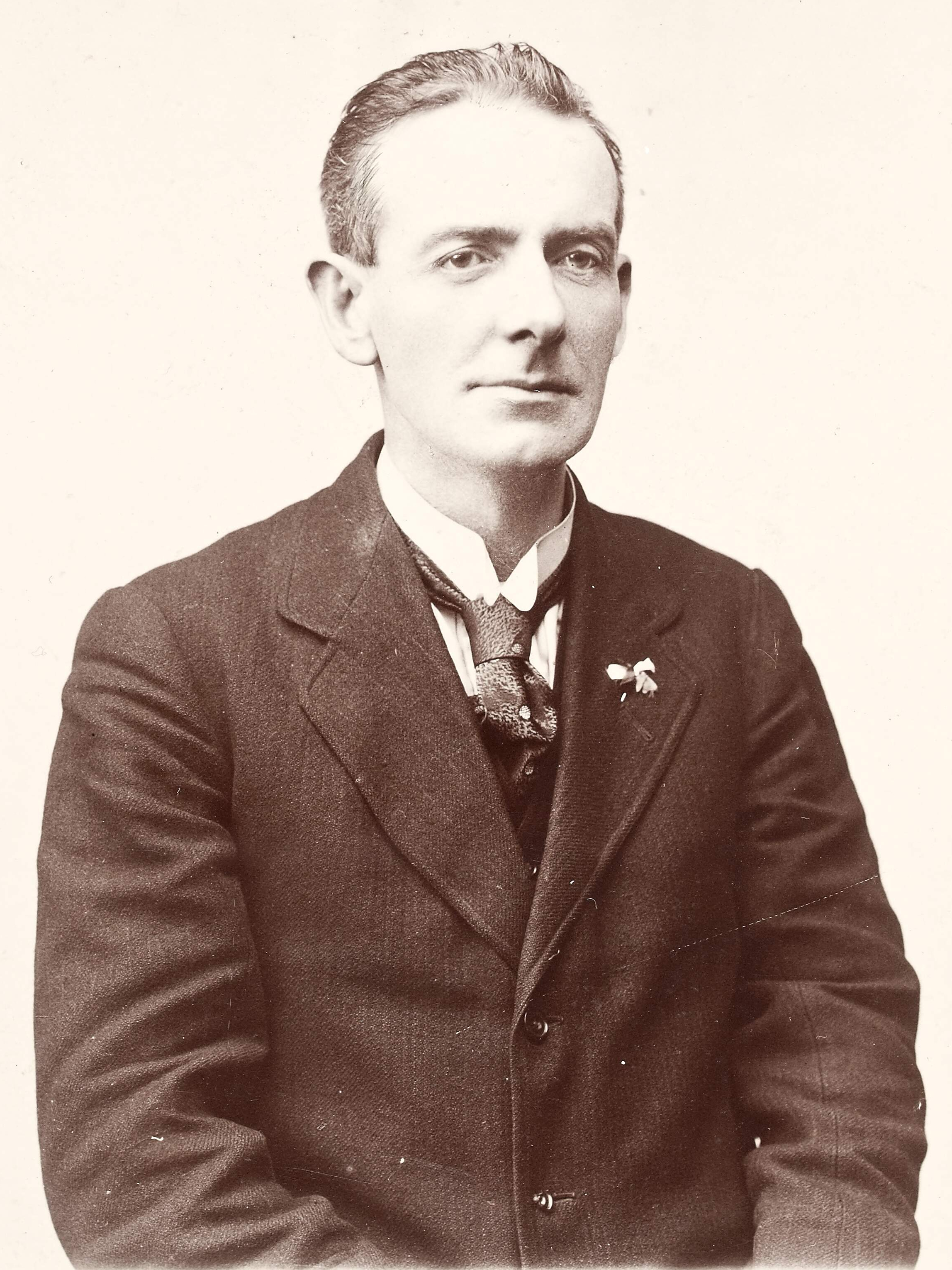
- Milroy, c. 1920s

Senator
- In office 27 April 1938 – 7 September 1938
- Constituency: Labour Panel

Senator
- In office 12 December 1928 – 29 May 1936

Teachta Dála
- In office May 1921 – 30 October 1924
- Constituency: Cavan

Member of Parliament for the House of Commons of Northern Ireland
- In office May 1921 – March 1925
- Constituency: Fermanagh and Tyrone

Personal details
- Born: John Ignatius Milroy; 1877 Cumberland, England
- Died: 30 November 1946 (aged 68–69) Dublin, Ireland
- Party: Sinn Féin; Cumann na nGaedheal; National Group; Fine Gael

Military service
- Branch/service: Irish Republican Army
- Unit: Irish Volunteers
- Battles/wars: Easter Rising

Seán Milroy (1877 – 30 November 1946) was an Irish revolutionary and politician, who took part in the 1916 Easter Rising and served as a TD from 1921 to 1924 and afterwards in the Seanad of the Irish Free State.

== Biography ==
Milroy was born in Maryport, Cumberland, England to Scottish parents. He moved to Cork as a young adult. He was a journalist by profession.

He was a close friend of Arthur Griffith and an early member of Sinn Féin, serving on its national executive from 1909 to 1912. He joined the Irish Volunteers, and in 1915 he was arrested and imprisoned for three months for a speech in which he urged Irishmen not to fight in World War I. He fought in the Easter Rising in 1916, and was later imprisoned in England. On 3 February 1919 he escaped from Lincoln Jail in England along with Seán McGarry and Éamon de Valera.

On 3 April 1918, Milroy contested a by-election for Sinn Féin in East Tyrone unsuccessfully. At the 1918 general election he stood in North East Tyrone, but an electoral pact brokered by Cardinal Michael Logue allocated the seat to the Irish Parliamentary Party and it was not contested by Sinn Féin. He remained on the ballot, receiving only 56 votes. He was elected a Sinn Féin TD at the 1921 elections for both Cavan and for Fermanagh and Tyrone. He voted in favour of the Anglo-Irish Treaty in January 1922. He supported the executions in December 1922 of Rory O'Connor, Liam Mellows, Dick Barrett and Joe McKelvey who were executed without trial or court martial, after serving five months in prison, the day after the assassination of a pro-treaty TD.

He became a member of Cumann na nGaedheal in 1923 but left the party in March 1924 to join the National Group in opposition to the Government's actions to the Army Mutiny. He resigned from his seat on 30 October 1924 along with seven other TDs. He was an unsuccessful candidate in the 1925 by-election in Dublin North. He unsuccessfully contested the June 1927 general election in Cavan.

In later years, he reconciled with his former colleagues and was elected to Seanad Éireann, serving for Cumann na nGaedheal (and later for Fine Gael from 1933) from 1928 until the Free State Seanad was abolished in 1936. He was re-elected to the new 2nd Seanad in 1938 on the Labour Panel, but failed to be re-elected to the 3rd Seanad following the 1938 general election.

== Sources ==
- Andrews, Todd (1979). Dublin Made Me.
- Coogan, Tim Pat (1995). De Valera: Long Fellow, Long Shadow.
- Gaughan, J. Anthony, ed. (1996). Memoirs of Senator Joseph Connolly: A Founder of Modern Ireland.
Colonial office intelligence file for John Milroy

British Army military intelligence file for John Milroy

Dáil	Election	Deputy (Party)	Deputy (Party)	Deputy (Party)	Deputy (Party)
2nd	1921	Arthur Griffith (SF)	Paul Galligan (SF)	Seán Milroy (SF)	3 seats 1921–1923
3rd	1922	Arthur Griffith (PT-SF)	Walter L. Cole (PT-SF)	Seán Milroy (PT-SF)	3 seats 1921–1923
4th	1923	Patrick Smith (Rep)	John James Cole (Ind.)	Seán Milroy (CnaG)	Patrick Baxter (FP)
4th	1925 by-election	Patrick Smith (Rep)	John James Cole (Ind.)	John Joe O'Reilly (CnaG)	Patrick Baxter (FP)
5th	1927 (Jun)	Paddy Smith (FF)	John O'Hanlon (Ind.)	John Joe O'Reilly (CnaG)	Patrick Baxter (FP)
6th	1927 (Sep)	Paddy Smith (FF)	John O'Hanlon (Ind.)	John Joe O'Reilly (CnaG)	John James Cole (Ind.)
7th	1932	Paddy Smith (FF)	John O'Hanlon (Ind.)	John Joe O'Reilly (CnaG)	Michael Sheridan (FF)
8th	1933	Paddy Smith (FF)	Patrick McGovern (NCP)	John Joe O'Reilly (CnaG)	Michael Sheridan (FF)
9th	1937	Paddy Smith (FF)	Patrick McGovern (FG)	John James Cole (Ind.)	Michael Sheridan (FF)
10th	1938	Paddy Smith (FF)	Patrick McGovern (FG)	John James Cole (Ind.)	Michael Sheridan (FF)
11th	1943	Paddy Smith (FF)	Patrick O'Reilly (CnaT)	John James Cole (Ind.)	Michael Sheridan (FF)
12th	1944	Paddy Smith (FF)	Patrick O'Reilly (CnaT)	Tom O'Reilly (Ind.)	Michael Sheridan (FF)
13th	1948	Paddy Smith (FF)	John Tully (CnaP)	Patrick O'Reilly (Ind.)	Michael Sheridan (FF)
14th	1951	Paddy Smith (FF)	John Tully (CnaP)	Patrick O'Reilly (FG)	Michael Sheridan (FF)
15th	1954	Paddy Smith (FF)	John Tully (CnaP)	Patrick O'Reilly (FG)	Michael Sheridan (FF)
16th	1957	Paddy Smith (FF)	John Tully (CnaP)	Patrick O'Reilly (FG)	Michael Sheridan (FF)
17th	1961	Paddy Smith (FF)	Séamus Dolan (FF)	Patrick O'Reilly (FG)	3 seats 1961–1977
18th	1965	Paddy Smith (FF)	John Tully (CnaP)	Tom Fitzpatrick (FG)	3 seats 1961–1977
19th	1969	Paddy Smith (FF)	Patrick O'Reilly (FG)	Tom Fitzpatrick (FG)	3 seats 1961–1977
20th	1973	Paddy Smith (FF)	John Wilson (FF)	Tom Fitzpatrick (FG)	3 seats 1961–1977
21st	1977	Constituency abolished. See Cavan–Monaghan			
