= 1929 Northern Ireland general election =

- 22 May 1929

All 52 seats to the House of Commons of Northern Ireland 27 seats were needed for a majority

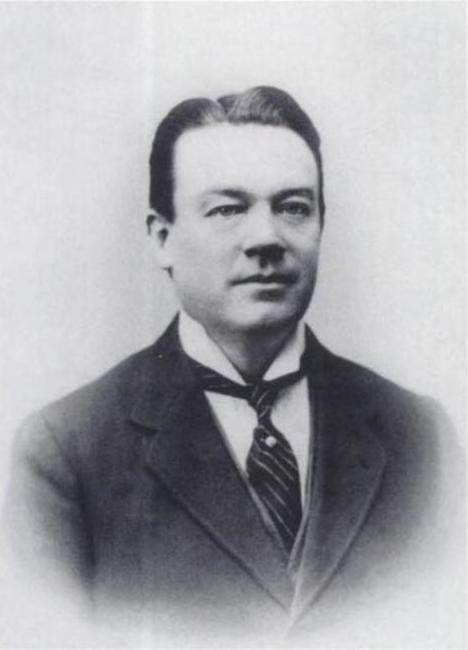
	First party	Second party	Third party
			NIL
Leader	Viscount Craigavon	Joe Devlin	Sam Kyle
Party	UUP	Nationalist	NI Labour
Leader since	7 June 1921	1918	1925
Leader's seat	North Down	Belfast Central	Belfast Oldpark (defeated)
Last election	32 seat, 55.0%	10 seats, 23.8%	3 seats, 4.7%
Seats won	37 (Note: Includes 16 members elected unopposed.)	11 (Note: Includes 6 members elected unopposed.)	1
Seat change	▲5	▲1	▼2
Popular vote	148,579 (Note: Voting only took place in 30 of 52 seats. The other 22 MPs were unopposed.)	34,069	23,334
Percentage	50.8%	11.7%	8.0%
Swing	▼4.2%	▼9.5%	▲3.3%
- Election results by constituency
Prime Minister before election
Viscount Craigavon
UUP
Prime Minister after election
Viscount Craigavon
UUP

The 1929 Northern Ireland general election was held on 22 May 1929. Like all previous elections to the Parliament of Northern Ireland, it produced a large majority for the Ulster Unionist Party.

It was the first election held after the House of Commons (Method of Voting and Redistribution of Seats) Act (Northern Ireland) 1929, which abolished proportional representation and redrawing of electoral boundaries to create single-seat constituencies (with Queen's University retained as a 4-seat constituency elected by single transferable vote). Though it had been argued this was done with the intent of gerrymandering, this has been considered unlikely as the Unionists already had a solid majority at the parliamentary level. However, the opposite was more accurate at local level. As with the rest of the United Kingdom, this has made it more difficult for independent and minor party candidates like the Northern Ireland Labour Party to win seats, as was the intent of the abolition of proportional representation was for the UUP to control the Unionist vote.

22 MPs (42%), mostly Ulster Unionists, were elected unopposed without any votes being cast. This began a trend which would continue for decades – until 1969, at least 20 MPs in every Northern Ireland general election would be elected unopposed.

== Results ==
↓
37	11	3	1
UUP	Nationalist	IU	NILP

1929 Northern Ireland general election
Party	Candidates						Votes		
Party	Stood	Elected	Gained	Unseated	Net	% of total	%	No.	Net %
UUP	43	37	N/A	N/A	+5	71.2	50.8	148,579	-4.2
Ind. Unionist	10	3	N/A	N/A	-1	5.8	14.3	41,778	+5.3
Nationalist	11	11	N/A	N/A	+1	21.2	11.7	34,069	-9.5
NI Labour	5	1	N/A	N/A	-2	1.9	8.0	23,334	+3.3
Ulster Liberal	5	0	N/A	N/A	-1	—	6.2	18,208	+4.9
Local Option	3	0	N/A	N/A	0	—	3.3	9,776	N/A
Town Tenants' Association	2	0	N/A	N/A	0	—	2.4	6,901	+1.5
Ind. Nationalist	1	0	N/A	N/A	0	—	1.3	3,694	N/A
Independent	1	0	N/A	N/A	0	—	1.2	3,437	N/A
Independent Labour	2	0	N/A	N/A	0	—	0.8	2,442	N/A

Electorate: 775,307 (432,439 in contested seats); Turnout: 67.6% (292,218). Ulster Liberal Party result is compared to Unbought Tenants' Association in 1925.

=== Votes summary ===
Popular vote
Ulster Unionist	50.85%
Independent Unionist	14.30%
Nationalist Party	11.66%
Labour	7.99%
Ulster Liberal	6.23%
Independent	3.28%
Other	5.71%

=== Seats summary ===
Parliamentary seats
Ulster Unionist	71.15%
Nationalist Party	21.15%
Independent Unionist	5.77%
Labour	1.92%

=== Contested seats ===
Only 30 of the 52 seats (58%) were actually contested.

1929 Northern Ireland general election (contested seats)
Party	Popular vote		Candidates		
Party	Votes	%	Stood	Elected	%
Ulster Unionist	148,579	50.8	27	21	70.0
Ind. Unionist	41,778	14.3	10	3	10.0
Nationalist	34,069	11.7	5	5	16.7
Labour	23,334	8.0	5	1	3.3
Liberal	18,208	6.2	5	0	—
Local Option	9,776	3.3	3	0	—
Town Tenants	6,901	2.4	2	0	—
Ind. Nationalist	3,694	1.3	1	0	—
Independent	3,437	1.2	1	0	—
Ind. Labour	2,442	0.8	2	0	—
Total	292,218	67.6%	61	30	—

=== Uncontested seats ===
In 22 of the 52 seats (42%), only one candidate stood and they were elected unopposed without any votes cast. The vast majority of the MPs elected without a contest were Ulster Unionists.

1929 Northern Ireland general election (uncontested seats)
Party	Popular vote		Candidates		
Party	Votes	%	Stood	Elected	%
Ulster Unionist	Unopposed		16	16	72.7
Nationalist	Unopposed		6	6	27.3
Total			22	22	100

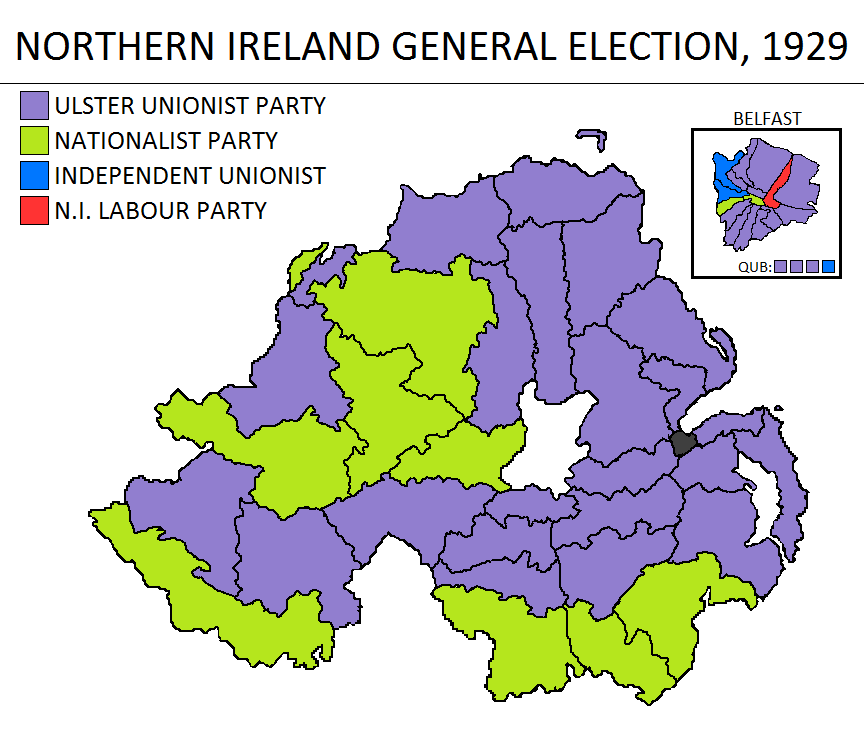
