= List of elections in 1929 =

The following elections occurred in the year 1929.

- 1929 Danish Folketing election
- 1929 Dominican Republic Constitutional Assembly election
- 1929 Dutch general election
- 1929 Finnish parliamentary election
- 1929 Greek Senate election
- 1929 Guatemalan parliamentary election
- 1929 Italian general election
- 1929 Mexican presidential election
- 1929 South African general election
- 1929 South-West African legislative election
- 1929 Strasbourg municipal election
- 1929 United Kingdom general election

== Africa ==
- 1929 Egyptian parliamentary election
- 1929 South African general election

== Asia ==
- 1929 Egyptian parliamentary election
- 1929 Hong Kong sanitary board election
- 1929 Soviet Union legislative election

== Australia ==
- 1929 Ashfield state by-election
- 1929 Australian federal election
- 1929 Balaclava by-election
- 1929 Franklin by-election
- 1929 Parramatta state by-election
- 1929 Queensland state election
- 1929 Victorian state election

== Europe ==
- 1929 Belgian general election
- 1929 Czechoslovak parliamentary election
- 1929 Danish local elections
- 1929 Estonian parliamentary election
- 1929 Greek presidential election
- 1929 Italian general election
- 1929 Monegasque general election
- 1929 Soviet Union legislative election
- 1928 Swiss referendums

=== United Kingdom ===
- 1929 United Kingdom general election
  - England: 1929 United Kingdom general election in England
  - Scotland: 1929 United Kingdom general election in Scotland
  - Wales: 1929 United Kingdom general election in Wales
  - Northern Ireland: 1929 United Kingdom general election in Northern Ireland
  - List of MPs elected in the 1929 United Kingdom general election
- 1929 Bath by-election
- 1929 Battersea South by-election
- 1929 Bishop Auckland by-election
- 1929 Eddisbury by-election
- 1929 Holland with Boston by-election
- 1929 Kilmarnock by-election
- 1929 Liverpool Scotland by-election
- 1929 Londonderry by-election
- 1929 Midlothian and Peebles Northern by-election
- 1929 Northern Ireland general election
- 1929 Preston by-election
- 1929 Tamworth by-election
- 1929 Twickenham by-election
- 1929 Wansbeck by-election

== North America ==
=== Canada ===
- 1929 Edmonton municipal election
- 1929 Ontario general election
- 1929 Saskatchewan general election
- 1929 Toronto municipal election

=== United States ===
- 1929 New York state election

==== United States lieutenant gubernatorial ====
- 1929 Virginia lieutenant gubernatorial election

==== United States gubernatorial ====
- 1929 United States gubernatorial elections
- 1929 Virginia gubernatorial election

==== United States House of Representatives ====
- 1929 United States House of Representatives elections

==== United States mayoral elections ====
- 1929 Boston mayoral election
- 1929 Indianapolis mayoral election
- 1929 Los Angeles mayoral election
- 1929 Manchester, New Hampshire mayoral election
- 1929 New York City mayoral election
- 1929 Pittsburgh mayoral election
- 1929 San Diego mayoral election

== Oceania ==
=== Australia ===
- 1929 Ashfield state by-election
- 1929 Australian federal election
- 1929 Balaclava by-election
- 1929 Franklin by-election
- 1929 Parramatta state by-election
- 1929 Queensland state election
- 1929 Victorian state election

=== New Zealand ===
- 1929 Bay of Islands by-election
- 1929 Hutt by-election

== See also ==
- Category:1929 elections
