= Melissa Elizabeth Banta =

American poet

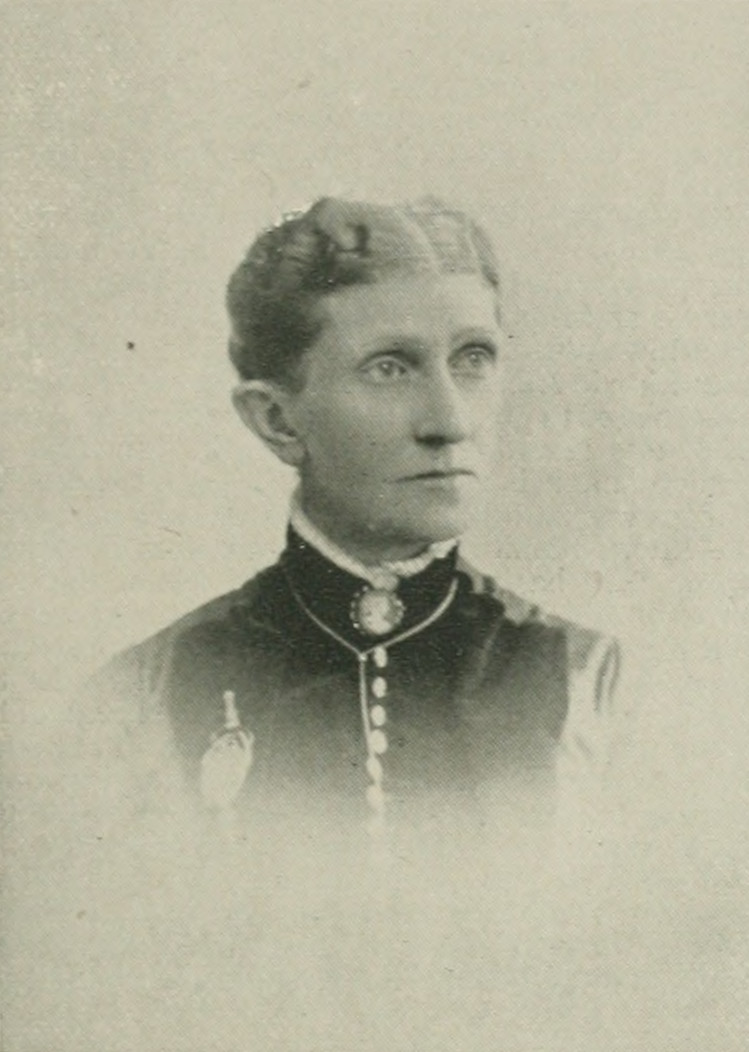
- Photo in A Woman of the Century
- Born: Melissa Elizabeth Riddle; March 27, 1834; Cheviot, Ohio, U.S.
- Died: May 9, 1907 (aged 73); Chicago, Illinois, U.S.
- Resting place: Greenlawn Cemetery, Franklin, Indiana, U.S.
- Education: Wesleyan Female Institute, Female Collegiate Institute
- Occupation: poet
- Spouse(s): Joseph I. Perrin (m. 1852; died 1853), David D. Banta (m. 1856; died 1896),
- Writing career
- Language: English
- Notable work: Songs of home

Signature
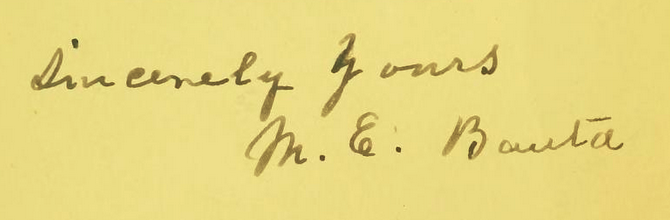

Melissa Elizabeth Banta (née, Riddle; after first marriage, Perrin; after second marriage, Banta; pen name, M. E. Banta; March 27, 1834 – May 9, 1907) was an American poet. She traveled in the U.S. and twice to Europe. She wrote letters of travel in addition to her poetry.

== Early life and education ==
Melissa Elizabeth Riddle was born in Cheviot, a suburb of Cincinnati, Ohio, March 27, 1834. Her father, James Riddle, was of Scottish descent, and her mother, Elizabeth Jackson, a Quaker, was of English origin. Banta was the sole daughter of the house. She attended the Wesleyan Female Institute in Cincinnati until her fourteenth year, when, on the removal of the family to Covington, Kentucky, she was placed in the Female Collegiate Institute of that city, where she was graduated at the age of seventeen years.

== Career ==
On August 29, 1852, she married Joseph I. Perrin, of Vicksburg, Mississippi. The young couple lived in Vicksburg, where the bride was a teacher in the public schools. He died of yellow fever at Vicksburgh, September 18, 1853. The widow's recollections of that time were vivid. Her poem, "The Gruesome Rain", embodied a grief, a regret and a hint of the horrors of that season. Sophia Fox, hearing of Banta's situation, sent her carriage and servants a distance of 25 miles (40 km) to carry the young widow to her plantation at Bovina, Mississippi. There, she remained for two months, until her parents dared to send for her. Fox, with characteristic southern warm-heartedness, had supplied all her needs and refused all proffered remuneration on the arrival of Dr. Mount, the old family physician. A daughter who was born at that time died in a few weeks, after which, Banta returned to her father's house.

Banta traveled twice to Europe and visited notable places in the United States. She wrote letters of travel in addition to her poetry.

== Personal life ==
For the sake of an entire change of scene, her father disposed of his home and business interests in Covington, temporarily, and removed to Bloomington, Indiana. It was there that the widow met Judge David Demaree Banta (1833–1896), whom she married June 11, 1856. Soon after the wedding, they went to Covington, Kentucky. He was admitted to the bar in 1857, and in October, they removed to Franklin, Indiana. The Bantas had two sons and one daughter. She died May 9, 1907, in Chicago, Illinois, after a long illness due to old age. She was buried at Greenlawn Cemetery in Franklin, Indiana.

== Selected works ==
=== As M. E. Banta ===
- Songs of home, 1895
