= List of MPs for constituencies in Wales (1929–1931) =

- 30 May 1929
- Colours on map indicate the party allegiance of each constituency's MP.

This is a list of members of Parliament in Wales, elected to the House of Commons of the United Kingdom in the 1929 general election.

== Composition ==
| Affiliation | Members |
|---|---|
| Labour Party | 25 |
| Liberal Party | 10 |
| Conservative Party | 1 |
| Total | 36 |

== MPs ==
| MP | Constituency | Party | In constituency since |
|---|---|---|---|
| Ernest Bennett | Cardiff Central | Labour Party | 1929 |
| Aneurin Bevan | Ebbw Vale | Labour Party | 1929 |
| William Cove | Aberavon | Labour Party | 1929 |
| George Daggar | Abertillery | Labour Party | 1929 |
| Clement Davies | Montgomeryshire | Liberal Party | 1929 |
| Charles Edwards | Bedwellty | Labour Party | 1918 |
| James Edmunds | Cardiff East | Labour Party | 1929 |
| Leolin Forestier-Walker | Monmouth | Conservative Party | 1918 |
| Peter Freeman | Brecon and Radnor | Labour Party | 1929 |
| Thomas Griffiths | Pontypool | Labour Party | 1918 |
| John Henry Williams | Llanelly | Labour Party | 1922 |
| David Grenfell | Gower | Labour Party | 1922 |
| George Hall | Aberdare | Labour Party | 1922 |
| Vernon Hartshorn | Ogmore | Labour Party | 1918 |
| Arthur Henderson Jr. | Cardiff South | Labour Party | 1929 |
| Daniel Hopkin | Carmarthen | Labour Party | 1929 |
| William Jenkins | Neath | Labour Party | 1922 |
| William John | Rhondda West | Labour Party | 1920 by-election |
| Henry Haydn Jones | Merioneth | Liberal Party | January 1910 |
| Morgan Jones | Caerphilly | Labour Party | 1921 by-election |
| Thomas Mardy Jones | Pontypridd | Labour Party | 1922 by-election |
| Frederick Llewellyn-Jones | Flintshire | Liberal Party | 1929 |
| Charles Lloyd | Llandaff and Barry | Labour Party | 1929 |
| David Lloyd George | Caernarvon Boroughs | Liberal Party | 1890 |
| Gwilym Lloyd George | Pembrokeshire | Liberal Party | 1929 |
| Megan Lloyd George | Anglesey | Liberal Party | 1929 |
| Henry Morris-Jones | Denbigh | Liberal Party | 1929 |
| Rhys Hopkin Morris | Cardiganshire | Liberal Party | 1923 |
| Goronwy Owen | Caernarvonshire | Liberal Party | 1923 |
| Robert Richards | Wrexham | Labour Party | 1929 |
| Howel Samuel | Swansea West | Labour Party | 1929 |
| James Walker | Newport | Labour Party | 1929 |
| R. C. Wallhead | Merthyr | Labour Party | 1922 |
| David Watts-Morgan | Rhondda East | Labour Party | 1918 |
| David Williams | Swansea East | Labour Party | 1922 |
| Ernest Evans | University of Wales | Liberal Party | 1924 |

== See also ==
- List of MPs elected in the 1929 United Kingdom general election
- 1929 United Kingdom general election
- 1929 United Kingdom general election in Wales
