= 1929 Indianapolis mayoral election =

Indianapolis mayoral election, 1929
- November 5, 1929
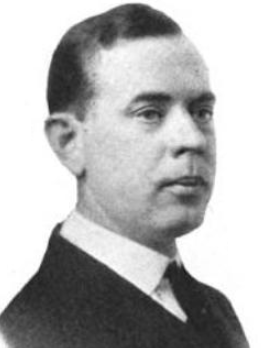

Nominee	Reginald H. Sullivan	Alfred M. Glossbrenner
Party	Democratic	Republican
Mayor before election
Lemuel Ertus Slack
Democratic
Elected mayor
Reginald H. Sullivan
Democratic

The 1929 Indianapolis mayoral election took place on November 5, 1929, and saw Democrat Reginald H. Sullivan winning in a landslide victory. Incumbent mayor, Democrat Lemuel Ertus Slack, had been appointed mayor in 1927 following the resignation of Republican John L. Duvall after he was convicted of corruption.

Duvall had been elected mayor in 1925 with the support of the Ku Klux Klan, and the Marion County Republican Party had close Klan ties. The City Council and school board both were composed of Klan-supported members. Shortly after the election, Klan leader and Duvall ally D. C. Stephenson was convicted of the abduction, rape, and murder of Madge Oberholtzer. In 1927, Duvall was found guilty of violating the corrupt practices act for promising a wealthy businessman and political leader the ability make three appointments in the city government in exchange for his support and a $14,500 campaign contribution. By November 1927, six of the nine members of the Indianapolis City Council were under indictment for corruption. Sullivan's victory was seen as a rebuke of the Ku Klux Klan and corruption in the city government.

The Republican nominee was businessman Alfred M. Glossbrenner.

Sullivan spent much of the campaign in a hospital bed after being injured in an airplane crash. Sullivan received strong support from African American and Catholic voters.

Coinciding mayoral elections across the state also saw Klan-supported, generally Republican, mayors voted out and replaced by new, generally Democratic, mayors. Anderson, Elkhart, Evansville, Fort Wayne, Lafayette, Muncie, and Terre Haute all replaced Klan-supported Republicans with Democratic mayors in what the New York Times hoped would be, "The dawn of a more liberal and cleaner political day in Indiana".

Preceded by 1925	Indianapolis mayoral election 1929	Succeeded by 1934
