= 1929 United States gubernatorial elections =

- November 5, 1929

1 governorship
	Majority party	Minority party
Party	Republican	Democratic
Seats before	30	18
Seats after	30	18
Seat change	Steady	Steady
Seats up	0	1
Seats won	0	1
- Democratic hold

United States gubernatorial elections were held in 1929, in the state of Virginia. Virginia holds its gubernatorial elections in odd numbered years, every 4 years, following the United States presidential election year.

== Race summary ==
=== Results ===
State	Incumbent	Party	First elected	Result	Candidates
Virginia	Harry F. Byrd	Democratic	1925	Incumbent term-limited. New governor elected. Democratic hold.	✓ John Garland Pollard (Democratic) 62.78%; William Moseley Brown (Republican) 36.95%; John J. Kafka (Socialist) 0.17%; W. A. Rowe (Independent) 0.11%
