= Claude E. Negley =

American politician (1873–1943)

28th Mayor of Indianapolis
- In office October 27, 1927 – November 9, 1927
- Preceded by: John L. Duvall
- Succeeded by: Lemuel Ertus Slack

Personal details
- Born: January 29, 1873
- Died: October 5, 1943 (aged 70)
- Resting place: Crown Hill Cemetery; Indianapolis, Indiana, U.S.
- Party: Republican
- Spouse: Ella Z. Johnson (m. 1899)
- Children: 4

Claude E. Negley (January 29, 1873 – October 5, 1943) was an American politician who was mayor pro tempore of Indianapolis from October 27, 1927, to November 9, 1927.

== Early life ==
Negley was the son of Peter L. Negley, a Civil War officer and farmer from Lawrenceville, Indiana. He graduated from Broad Ripple High School in Indianapolis. In 1899, he married Ella Z. Johnson of Castleton, Indiana. They had four daughters.

He was the head of the C. E. Negley Gravel Company until it dissolved in 1921. He then worked in real estate.

== Politics ==
In 1925, Negley was a candidate for the second district seat on the Indianapolis Common Council. He was one of five Republican candidates endorsed by the Ku Klux Klan, all of whom easily won in the primary election. That November, he defeated Democrat Robert K. Springsteen 53,152 votes to 43,102. In 1927, he was elected president of the council by a coalition of Republican and Democratic members who opposed the Republican majority that controlled the council the previous year.

On September 23, 1927, mayor John L. Duvall was found guilty of violating the corrupt practices act. Under the law, Duvall was barred from holding public office for four years following the date of the commission of the crime (November 2, 1925). However, Duvall stated he had no intention of resigning. On September 26, he appointed his wife to the position of city controller, which placed her first in the line of succession should he be removed from office. On October 27, the Common Council unanimously voted to declare of offices of mayor and city controller vacant and appointed Negley mayor pro tem. However, Ira M. Holmes, a Duvall ally, claimed that John L. Duvall had resigned earlier that day and Maude Duvall, as acting mayor, had appointed him city controller. She resigned soon after making the appointment, which made Holmes the rightful mayor. Negely was granted a temporary restraining order barring Holmes from interfering with his duties as mayor and Negely was allowed to serve as mayor until the city council selected someone to fill the remainder of Duvall's term. On November 9, 1927, Lemuel Ertus Slack, a Democratic attorney who previously represented the Ku Klux Klan, was elected by the city council after two Republican councilors broke with their party to end a 38-ballot stalemate.

On November 18, 1927, Negley and three other councilors were indicted for soliciting and accepting bribes from Duvall in exchange for voting against his impeachment. He resigned from the council on April 9, 1928, but maintained his innocence. On January 10, 1929, outgoing Marion County prosecutor William Remy filed a nolle prosequi to end the case against Negley.

== Death ==
Negley died on October 5, 1943, at the home of one of his daughters. He is buried in Crown Hill Cemetery.
