= 1925 Indianapolis mayoral election =

Indianapolis mayoral election, 1925
- November 3, 1925
- Turnout: 63.9%
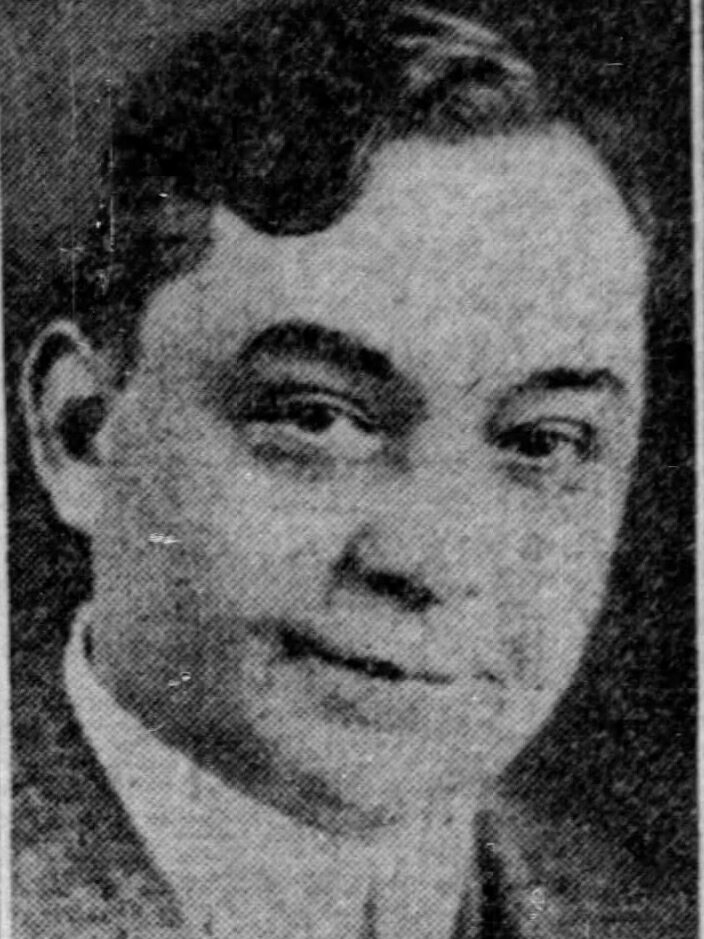

Nominee	John L. Duvall	Walter Myers
Party	Republican	Democratic
Percentage	55%	45%
Mayor before election
Samuel L. Shank
Republican
Elected mayor
John L. Duvall
Republican

The 1925 Indianapolis mayoral election was held on November 3, 1925, and saw the election of Republican Marion County treasurer John L. Duvall, who defeated Democratic former Indianapolis city attorney Walter Myers.

The 1925 municipal elections were notable for the presence of the Ku Klux Klan. John L. Duvall backed by the Indiana Klan. However, contemporarily, the election was considered to one of the most tame municipal elections in then-recent memory.

== Nominations ==
Walter Myers defeated A.G. Emhardt for the Democratic nomination.

Duvall beat anti-Klan candidate Ralph Lemcke by a plurality of 5,779 votes in a three-way contest with Delbert O. Wilmeth, who finished a distant third.

== Results ==
Duvall won roughly 52,000 votes to Myers' roughly 43,000 votes.

Duvall carried every ward except the city's 12th and 13th wards. Despite his being a Klansman, Duvall's victory was, in part, due to his carrying the predominantly African American 5th and 6th wards. Duvall, despite winning, underperformed in many wards compared to down-ticket Republicans.

Voter turnout was considered to be low, with only 95,872 out of an estimated 150,000 registered voters participating in the municipal election.

In the coinciding city council elections, which were voted at-large, six out of nine city council members elected were also pro-Klan Republicans. Additionally, the Klan-backed "United Protestant" slate won in the city's coinciding school board elections.

Preceded by 1921	Indianapolis mayoral election 1925	Succeeded by 1929
