= 1929 Greek presidential election =

- December 14, 1929
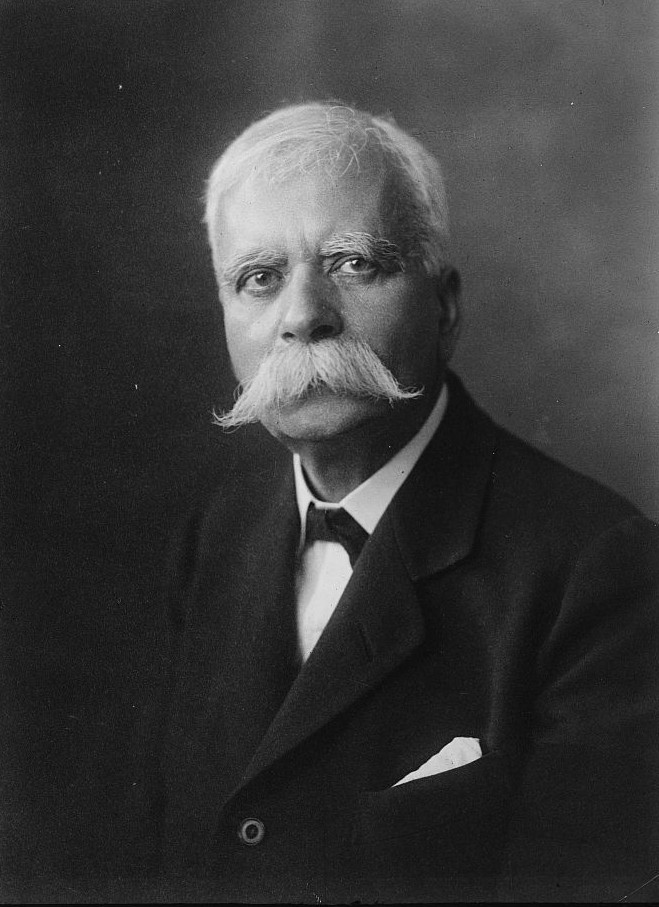

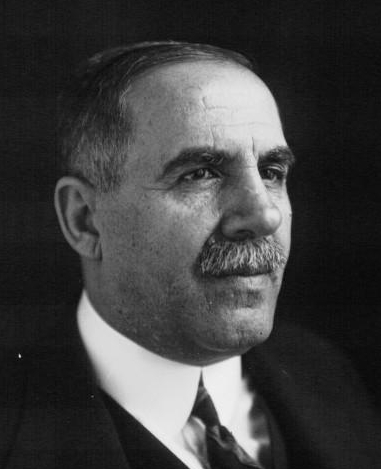
Nominee	Alexandros Zaimis	Georgios Kafantaris
Party	Independent
Electoral vote	257	22
Percentage	78.59%	6.73%
President before election
Pavlos Kountouriotis
Independent
Elected President
Alexandros Zaimis
Independent

Indirect presidential elections were held in Greece on December 14, 1929, following the resignation of President Pavlos Kountouriotis. Former six-time prime minister and incumbent acting President since December 10, 1929, Alexandros Zaimis defeated former short-term prime minister Georgios Kafantaris in a vote conducted by the Greek Parliament and Senate.

Zaimis was sworn in for his first full term as the third President of the Second Hellenic Republic that same day.

== Results ==
Candidate	Party	Votes	%
Alexandros Zaimis	Independent	257	78.59
Georgios Kafantaris		22	6.73
Themistoklis Sofoulis	Liberal Party	6	1.83
Pavlos Kountouriotis	Independent	2	0.61
Alexandros Papanastasiou	Democratic Union	1	0.31
Athos Romanos		1	0.31
Scattering		38	11.62
Total		327	100.00
Source: Daphnēs
