= 1929 United Kingdom general election in Scotland =

- 30 May 1929

All 74 Scottish seats to the House of Commons
- Turnout: 73.5% (▼1.6 pp)
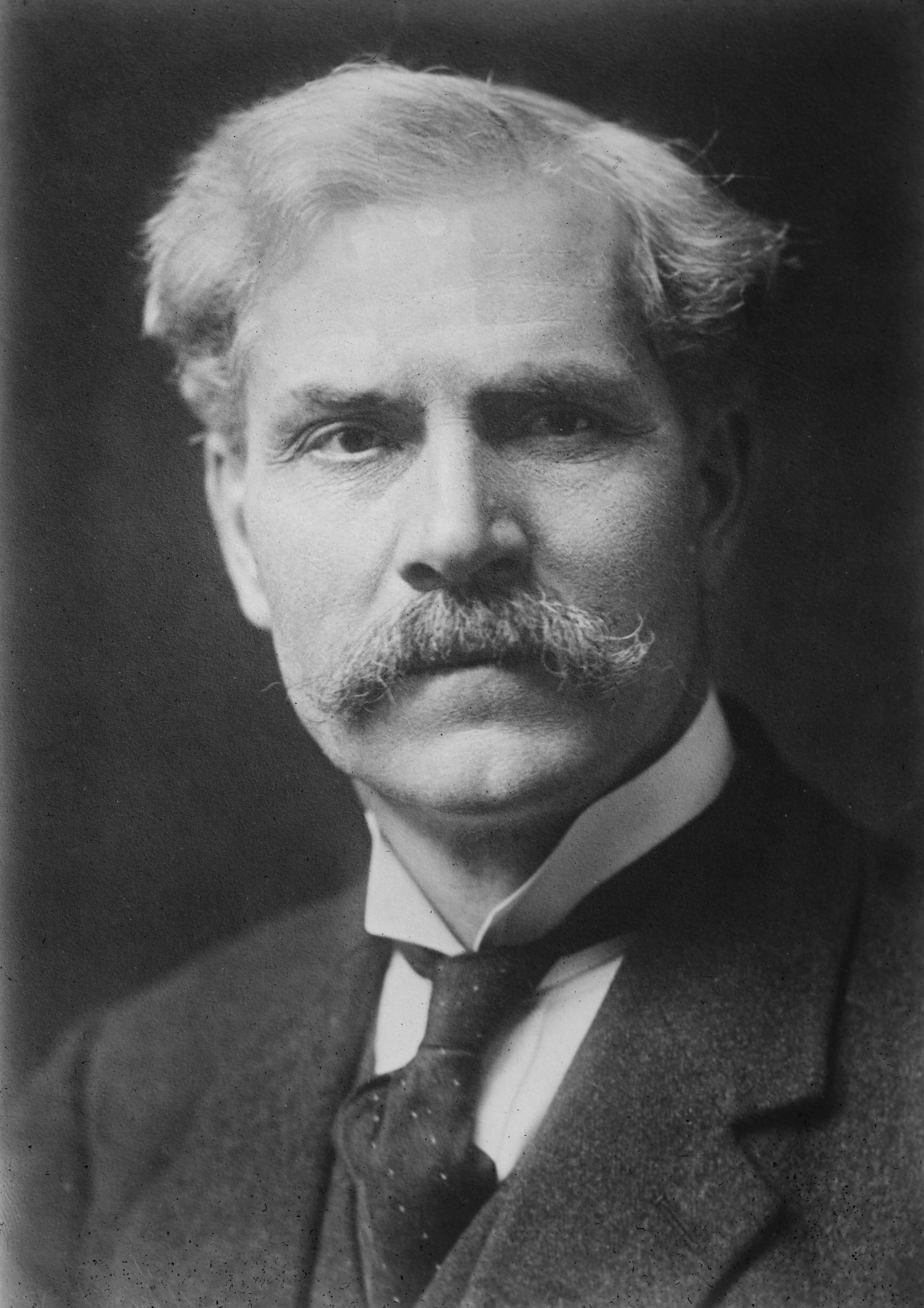

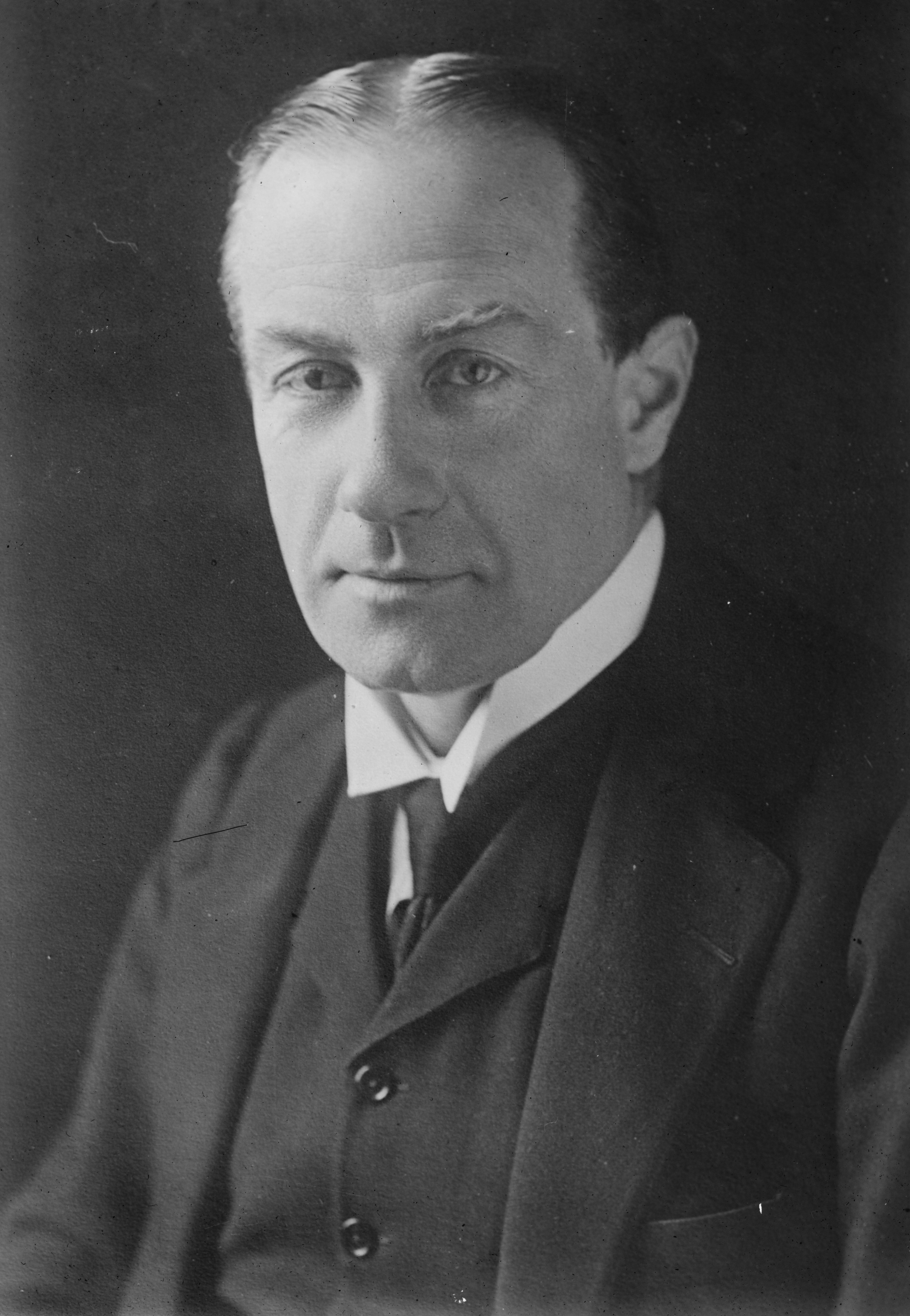

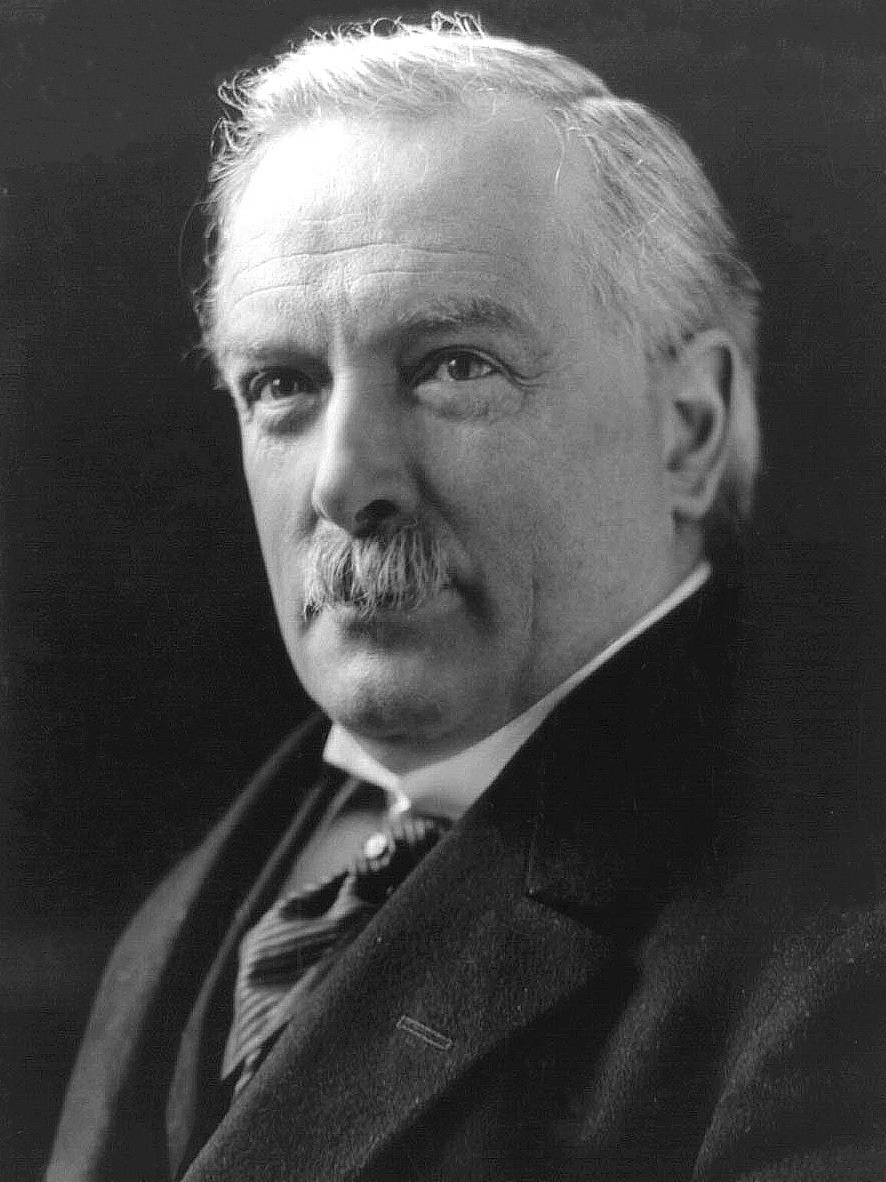
	First party	Second party	Third party
Leader	Ramsay MacDonald	Stanley Baldwin	David Lloyd George
Party	Labour	Unionist	Liberal
Alliance		Conservative	Liberal
Leader since	22 November 1922	23 May 1923	14 October 1926
Leader's seat	Seaham	Bewdley	Carnarvon Boroughs
Last election	26 seats, (Note: Combined results for burgh, county and university seats) 41.1%	38 seats, 40.7%	9 seats, 16.6%
Seats won	36	22	14
Seat change	▲10	▼16	▲5
Popular vote	937,300 (Note: Total and percentage votes given here are for territorial constituencies only)	792,063	407,081
Percentage	42.3%	35.9%	18.1%
Swing	▲1.2 pp	▼4.8 pp	▲1.5 pp

On Thursday 30 May 1929, the 1929 United Kingdom general election was held in Scotland, to elect all 615 members of the House of Commons, with 74 seats being in Scotland. 71 seats (32 burgh constituencies and 38 county constituencies) (Note: One burgh seat, Dundee, was represented by two members of parliament.) represented territorial constituencies. There was also one university constituency, which elected an additional 3 members using the Single Transferable Vote (STV) method.

As a result of the election across the United Kingdom, the Labour Party held the most seats in the House of Commons for the first time, but without an overall majority in its own right. Ramsay MacDonald returned as Prime Minister at the head of the new minority Labour Government. The Liberal Party also regained several seats from its losses in the 1924 general election and held the balance of power. These results followed a general swing towards Labour at this election.

The general election was the first in which women aged 21–29 had the right to vote (owing to the Representation of the People Act 1928). Women over 30, with some property qualifications, had been able to vote since the 1918 general election, but the 1929 poll was the first general election with universal suffrage for adults over 21, which was then the age of majority.

== Candidates ==
Below is a table summarising the candidates of the 1929 general election in Scotland, excluding those in the Combined Scottish Universities constituency.

Affiliation	Candidates
Labour Party	66 (Note: Includes 2 Co-operative Party candidates, as part of the Labour-Co-op alliance.)
Unionist Party	65
Scottish Liberal Party	45
Communist Party of Great Britain	10
National Party of Scotland	2 (Note: The candidates that stood were John MacCormick in Glasgow Camlachie and Roland Muirhead in West Renfrewshire.)
Independent Labour	2 (Note: The candidates that stood were Charles Oman in Caithness and Sutherland and Neil Maclean in Glasgow Govan.)
Scottish Prohibition Party	1 (Note: Leader Edwin Scrymgeour stood in Dundee.)
Scottish Protestant League	1 (Note: Leader Alexander Ratcliffe stood in Stirling and Falkirk.)
Total	192

== Analysis ==
As a result of the election, Labour across the United Kingdom obtained the highest vote share national, however did not gain the greatest number of seats. It stands as the fourth of six instances under the secret ballot, and the first of three under universal suffrage, in which a party has lost on the popular vote but won the highest number (known as "a plurality") of seats versus all other parties. This also occurred in 1874, January 1910 and December 1910 previously, and would occur again 1951 and February 1974.

The Labour Party won Stirlingshire West, Dunbartonshire, Lanark, Partick, Lanarkshire North, Renfrewshire West, Maryhill, Kilmarnock, Edinburgh West, Linlithgow and Berwick and Haddington from the Unionist Party. Neil Maclean was elected as member for Glasgow Govan standing under the Independent Labour label, but would subsequently go on to take the Labour whip in Parliament. His gain, however, was one from the Labour Party in this election in comparison to 1924.

Furthermore, the Scottish Liberal Party gained Banff, Aberdeenshire West and Kincardine, Fife East, Dumfriesshire and Galloway from the Unionists.

Edwin Scrymgeour, standing for the Scottish Prohibition Party, retained his Dundee seat with an increased majority. All other seats were won by official candidates for the three major parties. The election was the first general election in which the National Party of Scotland (a forerunner of the Scottish National Party) stood candidates.

== Seat summary ==
Below is a table summarising the total number of seats, gains and losses for each party in both the territorial county and burgh constituencies and the Combined Scottish Universities constituency.

Party	Seats				
Party	Total	Gains	Losses	Net	Of total (%)
Labour	36	1	11	▲10	48.6
Unionist	22	0	16	▼16	29.7
Liberal	14	5	0	▲5	18.9
Scottish Prohibition	1	0	0	Steady	1.4
Independent Labour	1	Did not stand in 1924		▲1	1.4
Total	74				

== County and burgh constituency results ==
Below is a table summarising the constituency results of the 1929 general election in Scotland, excluding the result in the Combined Scottish Universities constituency.

Party	Seats					Aggregate votes		
Party	Total	Gains	Losses	Net	Of total (%)	Total	Of total (%) (Note: Adjusted for multi-member constituencies.)	Change (%)
Labour	36	11	1 (Note: Neil Maclean re-contested and won Glasgow Govan, but not as an official candidate of the Labour Party.)	▲10	50.7	937,300	42.3	▲1.2
Unionist	20	0	16	▼16	28.2	792,063	35.9	▼4.8
Liberal	13	5	0	▲5	18.3	407,081	18.1	▲1.5
Scottish Prohibition	1	0	0	Steady	1.4	50,073	1.1	▲0.2
Communist	0	0	0	Steady	—	27,114	1.1	▲0.4
Independent Labour	1 (Note: Neil Maclean in Glasgow Govan.)	Did not stand in 1924		▲1	1.0	19,095	0.9	—N/a
SPL	0	New			—	6,902	0.3	New
National (Scotland)	0	New			—	3,313	0.2	New
Total	71			0	100.0	2,242,941	100.0	0.0
Registered voters, and turnout						2,940,456 (Note: Electorate in contested constituencies, which was all seats in this election.)	73.5	▼1.6

Popular vote
Labour	42.3%
Unionist	35.9%
Liberal	18.1%
Prohibition	1.1%
Communist	1.1%
Other	1.5%

Parliamentary seats
Labour	48.6%
Unionist	29.7%
Liberal	18.9%
Prohibition	1.4%
Ind. Labour	1.4%

== Combined Scottish Universities result ==
The Combined Scottish Universities elected an additional 3 members to the house using the STV voting method.

General election 1929: Combined Scottish Universities (3 seats)
Party	Candidate	FPv%	Count	
Party	Candidate	FPv%	1	2
Unionist	John Buchan	39.7	9,959	
Liberal	Dugald Cowan	26.7	6,698	
Unionist	George Berry	22.9	5,755	9,262
Labour	James Kerr	10.7	2,691	2,867
Electorate: 43,192 Valid: 25,103 Quota: 6,276 Turnout: 25,103

== See also ==
- 1929 United Kingdom general election in England
- 1929 United Kingdom general election in Wales
- 1929 United Kingdom general election in Northern Ireland
