= 1929 United Kingdom general election in Wales =

- 30 May 1929

All 36 Welsh seats to the House of Commons
- Turnout: 82.4% (▲2.4 pp)
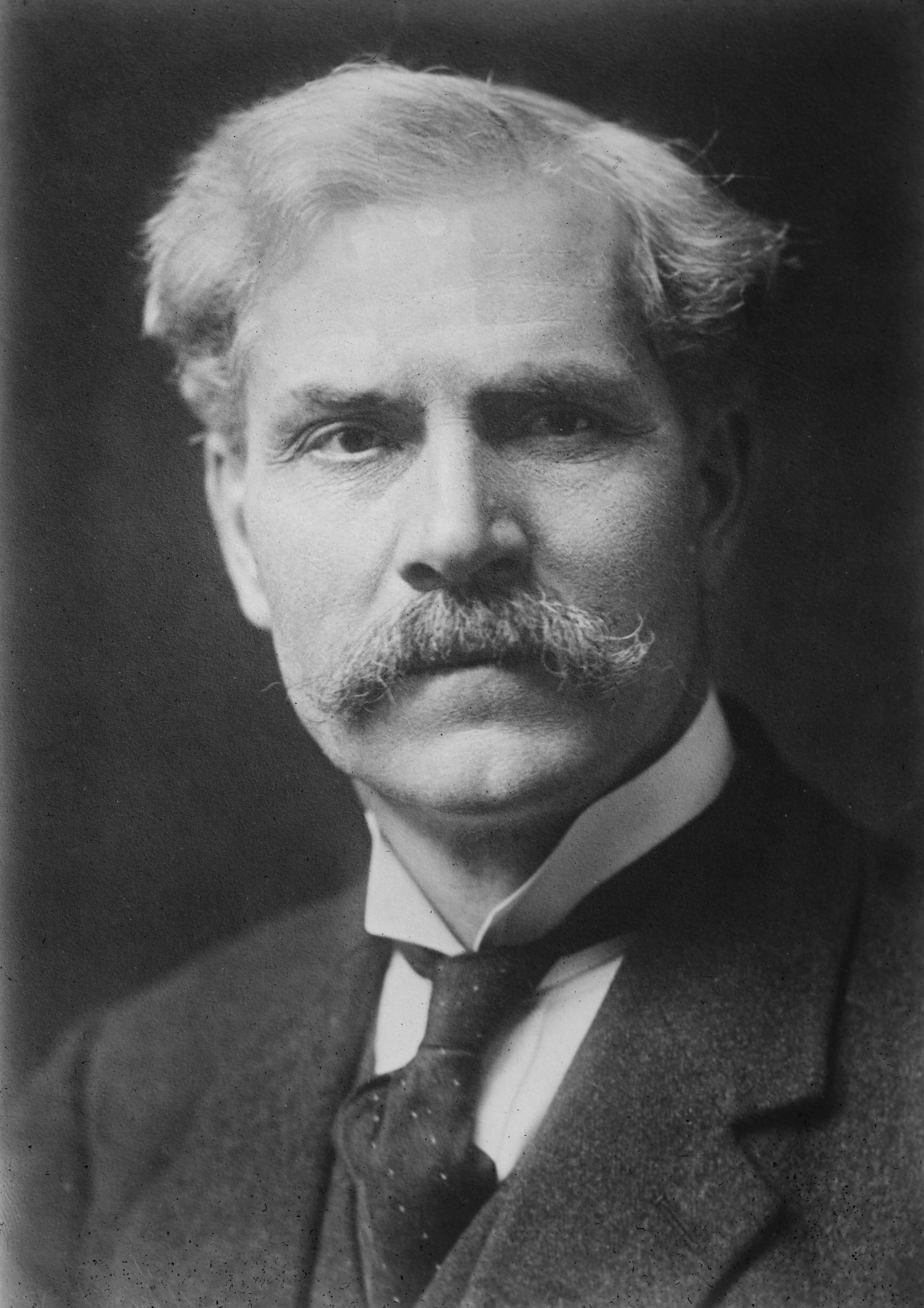

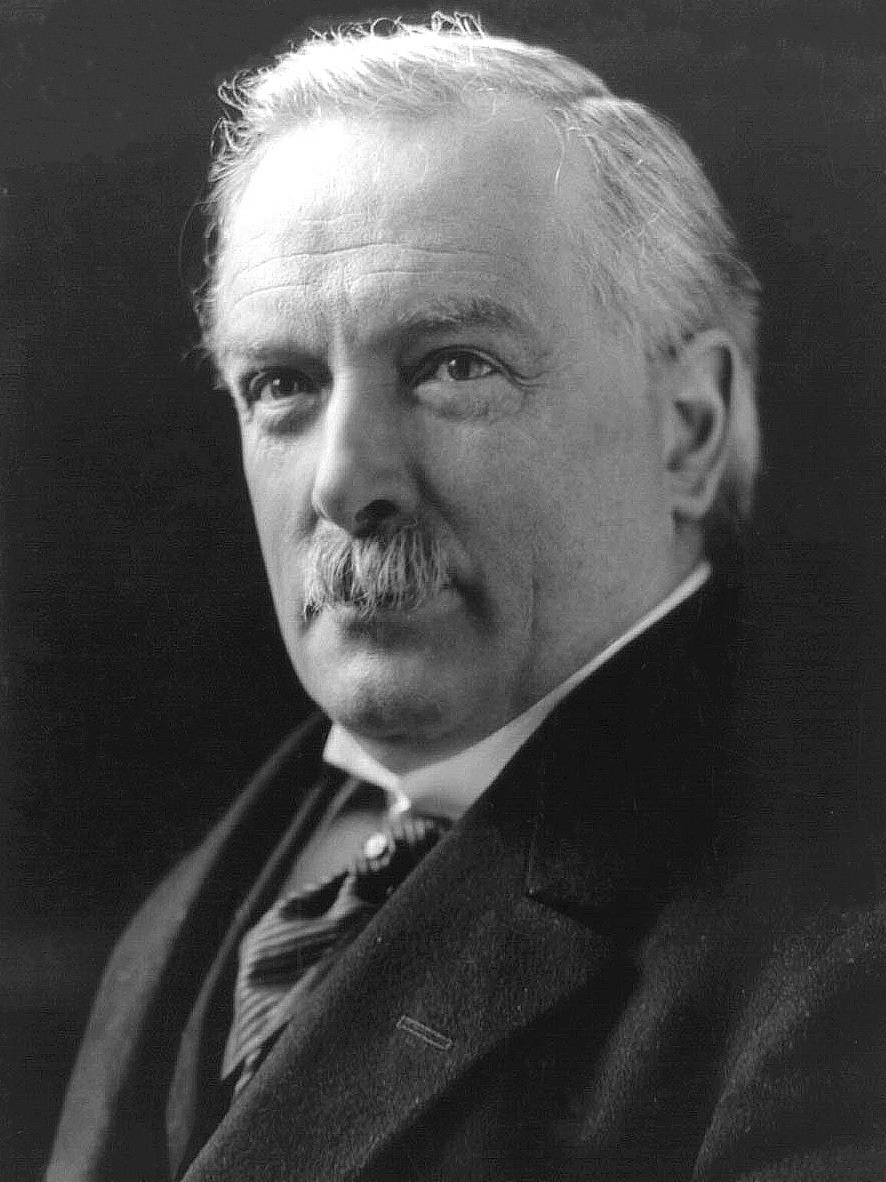

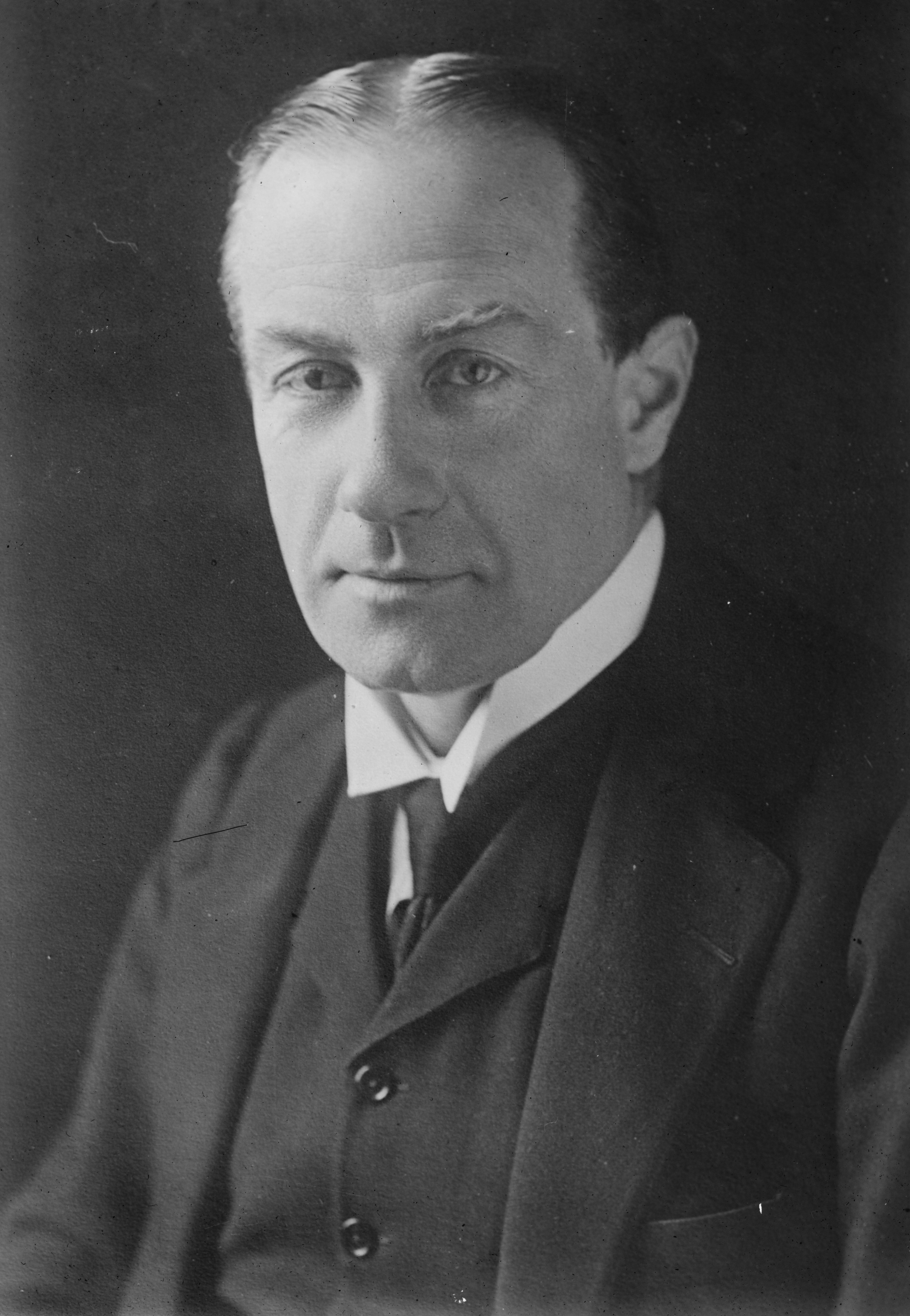
	First party	Second party	Third party
Leader	Ramsay MacDonald	David Lloyd George	Stanley Baldwin
Party	Labour	Liberal	Conservative
Leader since	22 November 1922	14 October 1926	23 May 1923
Leader's seat	Seaham	Caernarvon Boroughs	Bewdley
Last election	16 seats, (Note: Combined results for county, borough and university seats.) 40.6%	11 seats, 31.0%	9 seats, 28.4%
Seats won	25	10	1
Seat change	▲9	▼1	▼8
Popular vote	577,554 (Note: Total and percentage votes given here are for territorial constituencies only.)	440,911	289,695
Percentage	43.9%	33.5%	22.0%
Swing	▲3.3 pp	▲2.5 pp	▼6.4 pp

On Thursday 30 May 1929, the 1929 United Kingdom general election was held in Wales, to elect all 615 members of the House of Commons, with 36 constituencies being in Wales. 35 seats represented territorial constituencies contested under the first past the post electoral system, and one additional seat represented the University of Wales which was also contested under the first past the post electoral system.

As a result of the election across the United Kingdom, the Labour Party held the most seats in the House of Commons for the first time, but without an overall majority in its own right. Ramsay MacDonald returned as Prime Minister at the head of the new minority Labour Government. The Liberal Party also regained several seats from its losses in the 1924 general election and held the balance of power.

The general election was the first in which women aged 21–29 had the right to vote (owing to the Representation of the People Act 1928). Women over 30, with some property qualifications, had been able to vote since the 1918 general election, but the 1929 poll was the first general election with universal suffrage for adults over 21, which was then the age of majority.

== Candidates ==
Below is a table summarising the candidates of the 1929 general election in Wales, excluding those in the University of Wales constituency.

Affiliation	Candidates
Conservative and Unionist Party	35
Liberal Party	34
Labour Party	33
Communist Party of Great Britain	3 (Note: The candidates that stood were J. R. Wilson in Caerphilly, General Secretary John Ross Campbell in Ogmore and Arthur Horner in Rhondda East.)
Plaid Cymru	1 (Note: Founder and Leader of Plaid Cymru Lewis Valentine stood in Caernarvonshire.)
Total	106

== Analysis ==
Overall, the Labour Party under Ramsay MacDonald won the election, winning the most amount of seats in the House of Commons but without an overall majority across the United Kingdom. In Wales, Labour gained Wrexham, Carmarthen and Swansea West from the Liberal Party. It also gained Newport, Brecon and Radnorshire, Llandaff and Barry, Cardiff Central, Cardiff East and Cardiff South from the Conservative Party. Much like the rest of the United Kingdom, the Labour party increased its vote share. The party increased its seat count to a total of 25 seats, returning to its status as holding the majority of seats in Wales which it had lost in the previous election. This Labour Government would only last until 1931, however, following The Great Depression and lacking cabinet support. This would lead to the 1931 United Kingdom general election.

Notably, despite the increase in vote share for Labour at the election, Ramsay MacDonald moved seats from his constituency in Aberavon to the safer seat of Seaham, to avoid a potential highly embarrassing defeat due to the several local issues in the seat. The Labour candidate William Cove, however, retained the seat for the Labour Party with an increased vote share. Cove would hold the seat until 1959.

The Liberal party gained Flintshire and Pembrokeshire from the Conservatives. In addition, incumbent Liberal Member of Parliament Ernest Evans for the University of Wales retained his seat. Overall, the Liberals lost one seat in Wales. As a result of the losses to Labour and the Liberal Party, the Conservatives were reduced to one seat in Wales, only retaining Monmouth.

This was the first election ever contested by the newly formed Plaid Cymru. The party contested the seat of Caernarvonshire, polling 609 votes in the seat and thus placing fourth in the count. It was also the first election in which the Communist Party of Great Britain had stood candidates in Wales, including the General Secretary of the party John Ross Campbell. Notably, the decision to withdraw Campbell's prosecution under the Incitement to Mutiny Act 1797 by Prime Minister MacDonald in 1924 led to the loss of the motion of no confidence, which caused the 1924 United Kingdom general election and ended the first Labour Government. The Communists, however, only received 0.6 per cent of the vote in Wales.

== County and borough constituency results ==
Below is a table summarising the constituency results of the 1929 general election in Wales, excluding the result in the University of Wales constituency.

Party	Seats					Aggregate votes		
Party	Total	Gains	Losses	Net	Of total (%)	Total	Of total (%)	Change (%)
Labour	25	9	0	▲9	71.4	577,554	43.9	▲3.3
Liberal	9	0	1	▼1	25.7	440,911	33.5	▲2.5
Conservative	1	0	8	▼8	2.9	289,695	22.0	▼6.4
Communist	0	New			—	8,143	0.6	New
Plaid Cymru	0	New			—	609	0.0	New
Total	35			0	100.0	1,316,912	100.0	0.0
Registered voters, and turnout						1,598,509 (Note: Electorate in contested constituencies, which was all seats in this election.)	82.4	▲2.4

Popular vote
Labour	43.9%
Liberal	33.5%
Conservative	22.0%
Communist	0.6%
Plaid Cymru	0.0%

Parliament seats
Labour	71.4%
Liberal	25.7%
Conservative	2.9%

== University of Wales result ==
Below is a table summarising the 1929 constituency results for seat of the University of Wales constituency. The Liberal Party retained the seat, bringing the total seats of the Liberal Party to 10 out of the possible 36.

General election 1929: University of Wales
Party	Candidate	Votes	%	±%
Liberal	Ernest Evans	1,712	63.5	+4.1
Labour	David W. Richards	671	24.9	New
Conservative	Courtenay Mansel	314	11.6	New
Majority		1,041	38.6	+20.0
Turnout		2,697	74.4	
Liberal hold		Swing		

== See also ==
- 1929 United Kingdom general election in England
- 1929 United Kingdom general election in Scotland
- 1929 United Kingdom general election in Northern Ireland
- List of MPs for constituencies in Wales (1929–1931)
