= 1929 United Kingdom general election in England =

- 30 May 1929

All 492 English seats to the House of Commons
- Turnout: 76.6% (▼0.8 pp)
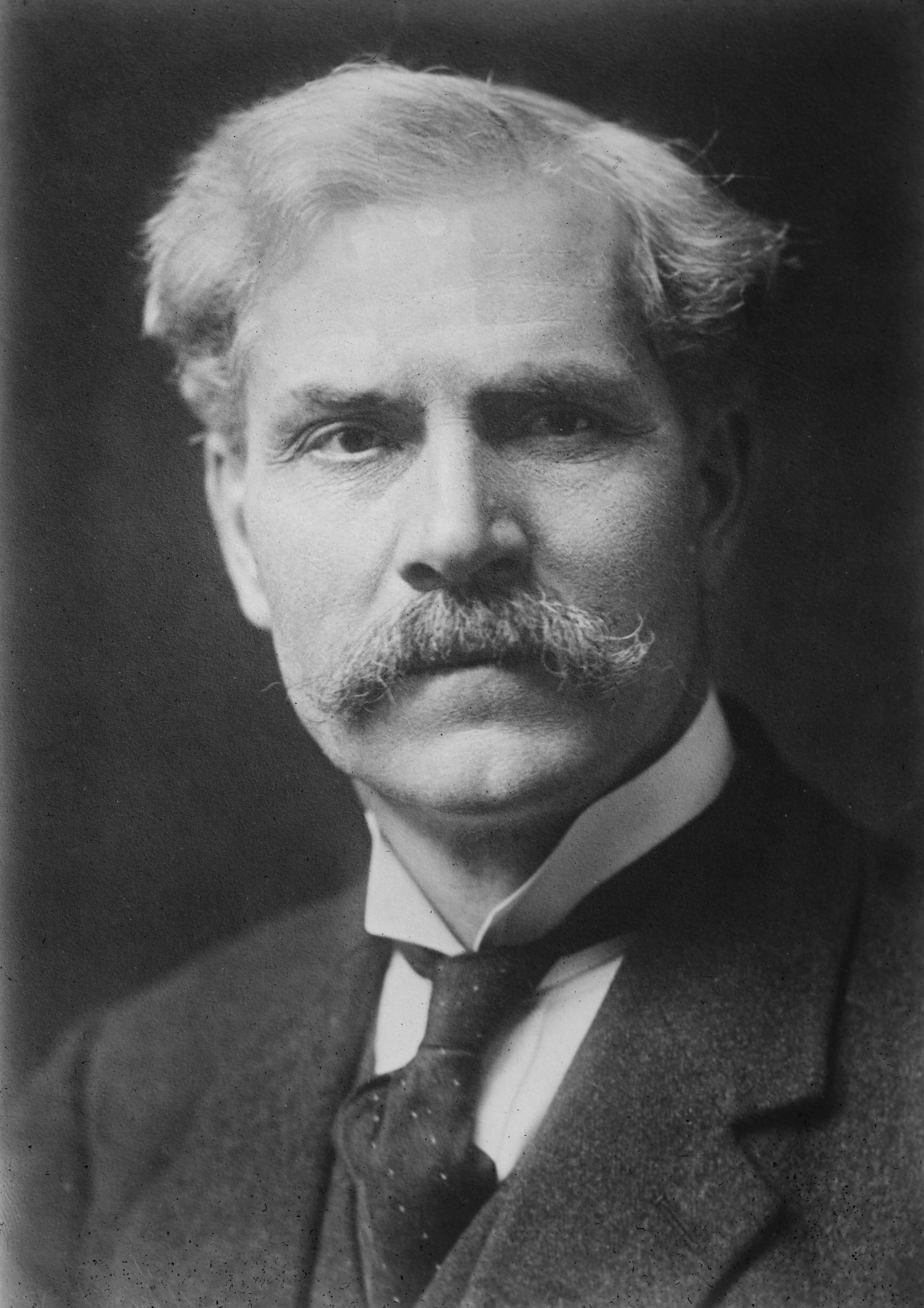

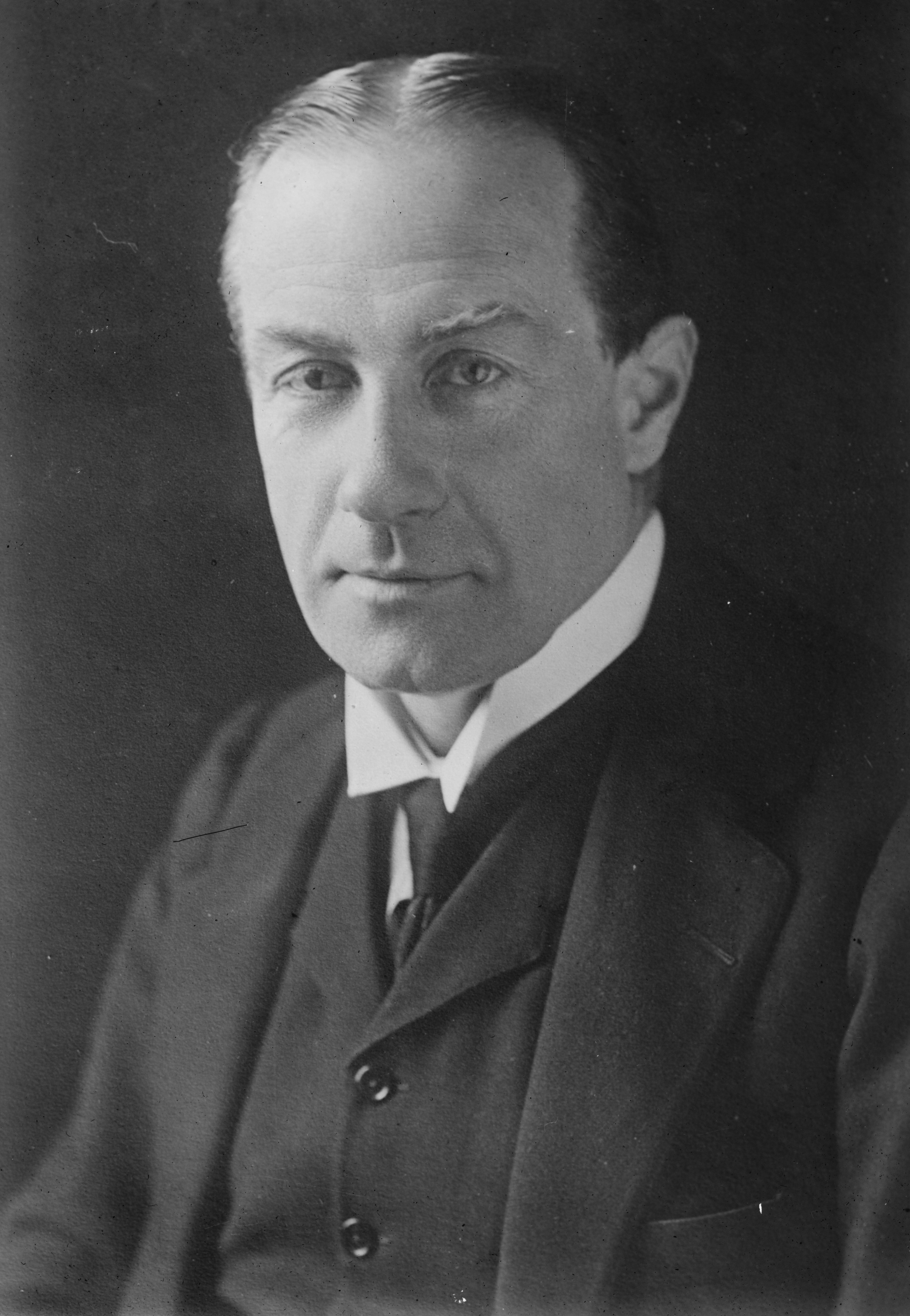

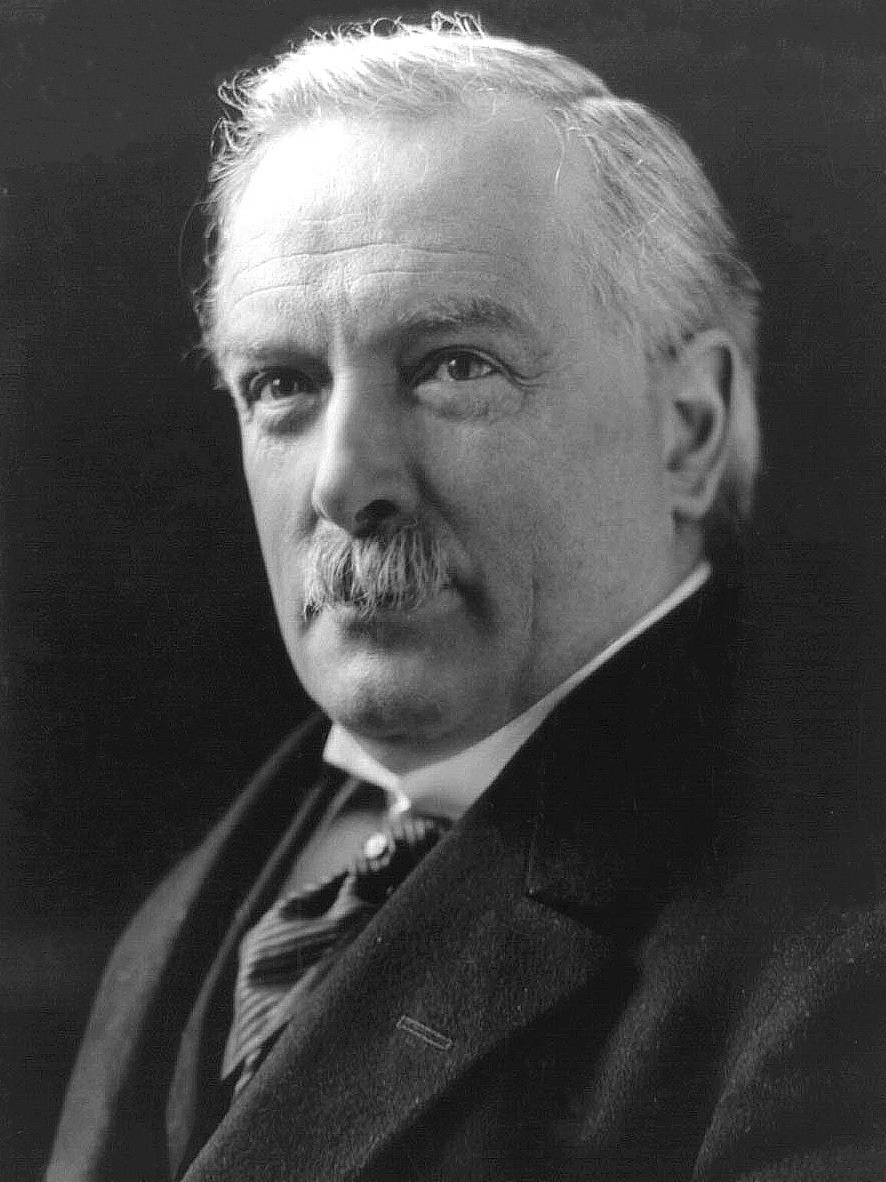
| | First party | Second party | Third party |
|---|---|---|---|
| Leader | Ramsay MacDonald | Stanley Baldwin | David Lloyd George |
| Party | Labour | Conservative | Liberal |
| Leader since | 22 November 1922 | 23 May 1923 | 14 October 1926 |
| Leader's seat | Aberavon | Bewdley | Caernarvon Boroughs |
| Last election | 109 seats, (Note: Combined results for county, borough and university seats.) 32.8% | 352 seats, 47.7% | 20 seats, 17.6% |
| Seats won | 226 | 226 (Note: Figure includes Speaker of the House of Commons Edward FitzRoy in Daventry.) | 35 |
| Seat change | ▲117 | ▼126 | ▲15 |
| Popular vote | 6,850,738 (Note: Total and percentage votes given here are for territorial constituencies only.) | 7,177,551 | 4,340,703 |
| Percentage | 36.9% | 38.8% | 23.6% |
| Swing | ▲4.1 pp | ▼8.9 pp | ▲6.0 pp |

On Thursday 30 May 1929, the 1929 United Kingdom general election was held in England, to elect all 615 members of the House of Commons, with 492 constituencies being in England. 485 seats represented territorial constituencies contested under the first past the post electoral system, and seven additional seats represented the university constituencies. Three university constituencies returned two members through the single transferable vote electoral system and one returned one member by the first past the post system.

As a result of the election across the United Kingdom, the Labour Party held the most seats in the House of Commons for the first time, but without an overall majority in its own right. Ramsay MacDonald returned as Prime Minister at the head of the new minority Labour Government. The Liberal Party also regained several seats from its losses in the 1924 general election and held the balance of power.

The general election was the first in which women aged 21–29 had the right to vote (owing to the Representation of the People Act 1928). Women over 30, with some property qualifications, had been able to vote since the 1918 general election, but the 1929 poll was the first general election with universal suffrage for adults over 21, which was then the age of majority.

== Candidates ==
Below is a table summarising the candidates of the 1929 general election in England, excluding those in the university constituencies.

| Affiliation | Candidates |
|---|---|
| Conservative and Unionist Party | 469 |
| Labour Party | 467 (Note: Includes 10 Co-operative Party candidates, as part of the Labour-Co-op alliance.) |
| Liberal Party | 422 |
| Communist Party of Great Britain | 12 |
| Independent | 8 (Note: The candidates that stood were J. C. Roberts in Camborne, Robert Newman in Exeter, John Watsonin in Gateshead, Noel Pemberton Billing in Hertford, Austin Hopkinson in Mossley, S. M. Holden in Preston, Thomas Robinson in Stretford and Thomas Gee in Wednesbury.) |
| Independent Conservative | 6 (Note: The candidates that stood were C. C. Gray in Colchester, P. E. Hurst in Eastbourne, W. J. Sholl in Harrow, J. Elliott in Harwich, Rayner Goddard in Kensington South and Frank Privett in Portsmouth South.) |
| Independent Liberal | 2 (Note: The candidates that stood were Freddie Guest in Bristol North and Charles Royle in Stockport.) |
| Independent Labour | 1 (Note: Candidate George Brigden stood in Birmingham Moseley.) |
| Nationalist Party | 1 (Note: Candidate T. P. O'Connor stood in Liverpool Scotland.) |
| Total | 1,388 |

== Analysis ==
=== Major parties ===
Although the Conservative Party maintained its position as having the greatest vote share in England at the election, the party won 221 seats in the county and borough constituencies. This was five fewer than the Labour Party, which had won an overall 226 seats, mainly from the Conservatives. However, combined with the five seats the Conservative Party retained in the university constituencies, it also have 226 seats in England. Nonetheless, the Labour party, despite not having the greatest vote share over the Conservatives in England, and with its seats in Scotland and Wales formed a minority government wth 287 seats.

Despite the increase in vote share for Labour at the election, Leader of the Labour Party Ramsay MacDonald moved seats from his constituency in Aberavon in Wales to the safer seat of Seaham, to avoid a potential highly embarrassing defeat due to the several local issues in the seat. The Conservatives, again in opposition, won a total 260 seats across the United Kingdom. This Labour Government would only last until 1931, however, following The Great Depression and lacking cabinet support. This would lead to the 1931 United Kingdom general election.

The Conservative Party did make one gain from the Labour Party in England, being the seat of Birmingham King's Norton, wherein Conservative candidate Lionel Beaumont-Thomas won seat from incumbent Robert Dennison by 491 votes.

The Liberal Party under David Lloyd George saw a small recovery from the previous election. Much like Labour, it won seats primarily at the expense of the Conservative Party. From the Conservatives, the Liberal Party won Bedfordshire Mid, Luton, Huntingdonshire, Isle of Ely, Birkenhead East, Eddisbury, Bodmin, Cornwall North, Penryn and Falmouth, St Ives, South Molton, Dorset East, Harwich, Hereford, Ashford, Darwen, Blackley, Withington, Bosworth, Holland with Boston, Great Yarmouth, Norfolk East, Nottingham East, Eye in England. It also won one of the two seats in Preston. Additionally, from Labour, the Liberals won Bethnal Green North-East and Newcastle upon Tyne East

Although the resurgent Liberals won seats, the party also lost seats from Labour. The Liberals lost to Labour Chesterfield, South Shields, Walthamstow West, Bristol North, Bristol South, Kingston upon Hull Central, Hackney South, Lambeth North, Bradford East and Batley and Morley in England. The Party also lost one of the two seats in both Blackburn and Oldham. In Kingston upon Hull Central, Labour candidate Joseph Kenworthy retained the seat after the 1926 Kingston upon Hull Central by-election after Strabolgi had switched from being the Liberal member of the seat to the Labour Party. The retention and switch of party was therefore a gain for the Labour Party.

=== Constitutionalists ===
Amongst the seven Constitutionalist candidates that had won seats in the last election, all had either switched or returned to parties, and either won their seats or lost them to another party, or stood again but as independent candidates. The movement of such candidates - to bring about a reconciliation of the working relationship between the Conservatives and Liberal Party - had not come about, with candidates no longer running under that label. Hamar Greenwood in Walthamstow East had retaken the Conservative Whip, however did not re-contest the seat, which was consequently won by Labour at this election. Algernon Moreing in Camborne retook the Conservative whip, however lost the seat to the Liberal Party when re-contesting at this election. J. Hugh Edwards in Accrington and John Ward in Stoke-on-Trent both returned to the Liberal Party Whip, however they lost their seats against Labour when re-contesting.

However, three of the seven former-Constitutionalist candidates retained their seats. Abraham England in Heywood and Radcliffe rejoined the Liberal Party and retained his seat, representing a gain for the Liberals when compared to the previous election. In Epping, Winston Churchill, a former-Constitutionalist, former member of the Liberal Party and former Deputy Leader of the defunct National Liberal Party, was made the official candidate of the Conservative Party in that seat. His retention of the seat was a gain for the Conservatives (one of the only two in the entire United Kingdom at this election). Finally, Thomas Robinson retained Stretford, though he stood as an Independent candidate rather than joining or rejoining any party.

=== Minor parties and independents ===
Both Robinson in Stretford and Robert Newman gaining a seat in Exeter were gains for the independents in England and across the United Kingdom at the election in territorial constituencies. Newman, who was a member in his seat in the previous election for the Conservatives, retained his seat as an independent in this election, representing a gain from the Conservatives. However, Labour gained Mossley from Austin Hopkinson by over 5,000 votes. Hopkinson would go on to return to Parliament in this seat in the next election.

Eleanor Rathbone won one of the two seats in the Combined English Universities constituency. The gain was from the Liberal Party from the previous sitting member H. A. L. Fisher. Fisher had resigned his seat following the last election, with Conservative Alfred Hopkinson winning the seat in the 1926 Combined English Universities by-election. However, Rathbone's win was a gain from the Liberal Party compared to the last election, along with Hopkinson not re-contesting the seat for the Conservatives. She would hold the seat until her death in 1946.

England's only Communist MP in Battersea North, Shapurji Saklatvala, lost his seat to Labour's William Sanders. Saklatvala would leave Parliament at this election, though attempt his seat again at the next election. Irish Nationalist and the then Father of the House T. P. O'Connor once again won his seat unopposed in Liverpool Scotland. O'Connor died six months after the election, causing the 1929 Liverpool Scotland by-election, at which Labour candidate David Logan won unopposed by any other candidate.

== Seat summary ==
Below is a table summarising the total number of seats, gains and losses for each party in both the territorial county and borough constituencies and the English university constituencies.

| Party | Seats | | | | |
| Party | Total | Gains | Losses | Net | Of all (%) |
|---|---|---|---|---|---|
| Labour | 226 | 120 | 3 | ▲117 | 45.7 |
| Conservative | 226 | 2 | 128 | ▼126 | 45.7 |
| Liberal | 35 | 28 | 13 | ▲15 | 7.1 |
| Independent | 4 | 3 | 1 | ▲2 | 0.4 |
| Irish Nationalist | 1 | 0 | 0 | Steady | 0.2 |
| Communist | 0 | 0 | 1 | ▼1 | — |
| Other non-contested | 0 | —N/a | | ▼7 | — |
| Total | 492 | | | | |

== County and borough constituency results ==
Below is a table summarising the constituency results of the 1929 general election in England, excluding the result in the university constituencies.

| Party | Seats | | | | | Aggregate votes | | |
| Party | Total | Gains | Losses | Net | Of all (%) | Total | Of all (%) (Note: Adjusted for multi-member constituencies.) | Change (%) |
|---|---|---|---|---|---|---|---|---|
| Labour | 226 | 120 | 3 | ▲117 | 46.5 | 6,850,738 | 36.9 | ▲4.1 |
| Conservative | 221 | 2 (Note: Winston Churchill in Epping and Lionel Beaumont-Thomas in Birmingham King's Norton.) | 128 | ▼126 | 45.6 | 7,177,551 | 38.8 | ▼8.8 |
| Liberal | 35 | 28 | 12 | ▲16 | 7.2 | 4,340,703 | 23.6 | ▲6.0 |
| Independent | 2 | 2 (Note: Robert Newman in Exeter and Thomas Robinson in Stretford.) | 1 (Note: Austin Hopkinson in Mossley.) | ▲1 | 0.4 | 74,693 | 0.4 | ▲0.3 |
| Independent Liberal | 0 | Did not stand in 1924 | | | — | 21,287 | 0.1 | —N/a |
| Ind. Conservative | 0 | Did not stand in 1924 | | | — | 21,221 | 0.1 | —N/a |
| Communist | 0 | 0 | 1 (Note: Shapurji Saklatvala in Battersea North.) | ▼1 | — | 15,377 | 0.1 | ▼0.2 |
| Independent Labour | 0 | Did not stand in 1924 | | | — | 675 | 0.1 | —N/a |
| Irish Nationalist | 1 (Note: T. P. O'Connor in Liverpool Scotland.) | 0 | 0 | Steady | 0.2 | 0 | 0.0 | Steady |
| Other non-contested | 0 | —N/a | | ▼7 | — | 0 | 0.0 | —N/a |
| Total | 485 | | | 0 | 100.0 | 18,502,245 | 100.0 | 0.0 |
| Registered voters, and turnout | | | | | | 23,295,179 (Note: Electorate in contested constituencies. The total electorate was 23,424,580.) | 76.6 | ▼0.8 |

Popular vote
| Conservative | 38.8% |
| Labour | 36.9% |
| Liberal | 23.6% |
| Other | 0.7% |

Parliament seats
| Labour | 46.5% |
| Conservative | 45.6% |
| Liberal | 7.2% |
| Other | 0.6% |

== University constituency results ==
=== University results summary ===
Below is a table summarising the seats and vote share of the English university constituencies in the 1929 general election.

| Party | Seats | | | | First preference votes | |
| Party | Total | Gains | Losses | Net | Total | Of all (%) |
|---|---|---|---|---|---|---|
| Conservative | 5 | 0 | 0 | Steady | 26,231 | 54.2 |
| Independent | 2 | 1 | 0 | ▲1 | 9,200 | 19.0 |
| Liberal | 0 | 0 | 1 | ▼1 | 11,530 | 23.8 |
| Labour | 0 | 0 | 0 | Steady | 1,463 | 3.0 |
| Total | 7 | | | | 48,424 | |

=== Cambridge University ===
The constituency for Cambridge University returned two Members of Parliament using the single transferable vote electoral system. The electorate consisted of graduates of the university.

General election 1929: Cambridge University (2 seats)
| Party | Candidate | FPv% | Count | |
| Party | Candidate | FPv% | 1 | 2 |
|---|---|---|---|---|
| Unionist | John Withers | 39.76 | 6,356 | |
| Unionist | Godfrey Wilson | 31.71 | 5,069 | 6,046 |
| Liberal | Hubert Henderson | 19.38 | 3,099 | 3,131 |
| Labour | Alexander Wood | 9.15 | 1,463 | 1,480 |
Electorate: 23,978 Valid: 15,987 Quota: 5,330 Turnout: 66.67%

=== Combined English Universities ===
The Combined English Universities constituency, which represented effectively all red brick universities and Durham University, returned two Members of Parliament using the single transferable vote electoral system. The electorate consisted of graduates of the university.

General Election 1929: Combined English Universities (2 seats)
| Party | Candidate | FPv% | Count | |
| Party | Candidate | FPv% | 1 | 2 |
|---|---|---|---|---|
| Unionist | Martin Conway | 26.8 | 2,679 | 4,321 |
| Independent | Eleanor Rathbone | 33.3 | 3,331 | 3,394 |
| Liberal | Robert Seymour Conway | 22.3 | 2,231 | 2,281 |
| Unionist | Amherst Selby-Bigge | 17.6 | 1,762 | eliminated |
Electorate: 13,775 Valid: 10,003 Quota: 3,335 Turnout: 72.6%

=== London University ===
The constituency for London University returned one Member of Parliament using the First-past-the-post electoral system. The electorate consisted of graduates of the university.

General election 1929: London University
| Party | Candidate | Votes | % | ±% |
|---|---|---|---|---|
| Independent | Ernest Graham-Little | 5,869 | 53.5 | +16.4 |
| Liberal | Walter Layton | 2,923 | 26.6 | +8.8 |
| Unionist | Sir John William Gilbert | 2,179 | 19.9 | −12.7 |
| Majority | | 2,946 | 26.9 | +22.4 |
| Turnout | | 10,971 | 70.5 | −1.5 |
| Independent hold | | Swing | | |

=== Oxford University ===
The constituency for Oxford University returned two Members of Parliament using the single transferable vote electoral system. The electorate consisted of graduates of the university.

General Election 1929: Oxford University (2 seats)
| Party | Candidate | FPv% | Count | |
| Party | Candidate | FPv% | 1 | 2 |
|---|---|---|---|---|
| Unionist | Lord Hugh Cecil | 52.45 | 6,012 | |
| Unionist | Charles Oman | 18.97 | 2,174 | 4,112 |
| Liberal | Gilbert Murray | 28.59 | 3,277 | 3,529 |
Electorate: 15,770 Valid: 11,463 Quota: 3,822 Turnout: 72.69%

== See also ==
- 1929 United Kingdom general election in Scotland
- 1929 United Kingdom general election in Wales
- 1929 United Kingdom general election in Northern Ireland
