= 1929 Dominican Republic Constitutional Assembly election =

Election in the Dominican Republic

Constitutional Assembly elections were held in the Dominican Republic on 1 June 1929. The role of the Assembly was to review and amend certain articles of the constitution, which resulted in an amendment to repeal the ban on presidential re-elections. Voter turnout was low and in some places ballots were not even counted.
