= 1929 Soviet Union legislative election =

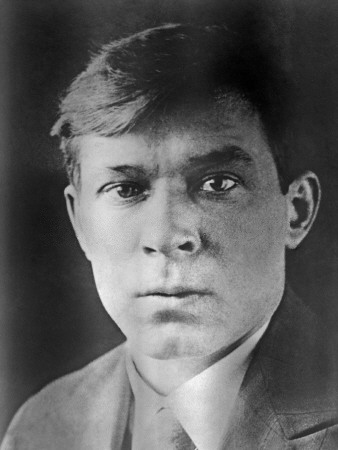
Mugshot of Aleksander Kosarev from 1937.

Legislative elections were held in the Soviet Union in 1929 to elect members of the Congress of Soviets.

The elections were noteworthy for their rowdiness and elements of political opposition. Within the Communist Party, the Left Opposition attempted to run rival candidates against the officially nominated Communist candidates, while outside the party the Russian Orthodox Church attempted to create an organized opposition with religious candidates. Kulaks, Tolstoyans, and Baptists also were active in illicit anti-Communist electoral campaigning. Peasants demanded the creation of "peasant unions" on an equal footing with urban trade unions, and urban workers complained that Communist officials had become a new privileged class. Ethnic strife and the Soviet government's financial support of Comintern were also issues raised against the official candidates. Marches in opposition to the official candidates were held and in some areas in the provinces Communist officials were physically attacked.

However, in the actual elections the communist candidates won a large majority and the opposition forces did not make any headway.
