= John L. Duvall =

American politician (1874–1962)

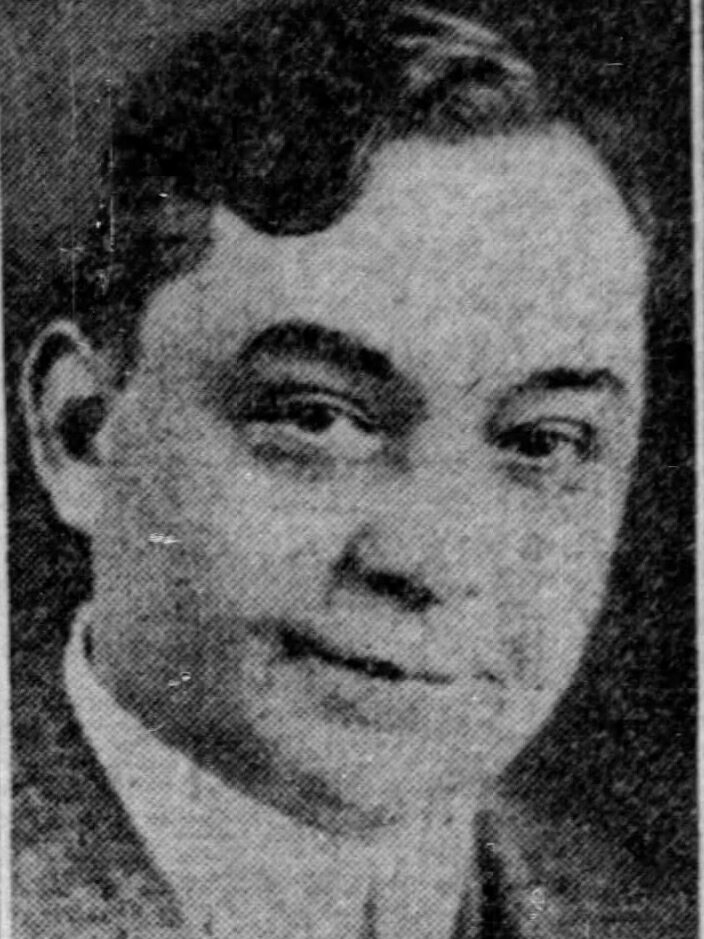

27th Mayor of Indianapolis
- In office January 4, 1926 – October 27, 1927
- Preceded by: Lew Shank
- Succeeded by: Claude E. Negley

Personal details
- Born: John Leslie Duvall; November 29, 1874 Tazewell County, Illinois, U.S.
- Died: February 25, 1962 (aged 87) Indianapolis, Indiana, U.S.
- Resting place: Crown Hill Cemetery; Indianapolis, Indiana, U.S.
- Party: Republican
- Spouse: Maude Buser (m. 1917)
- Children: 2
- Education: University of Chicago Law School
- Occupation: Attorney; Bank officer

John Leslie Duvall (November 29, 1874 – February 25, 1962) was an American politician who was mayor of Indianapolis from January 4, 1926, until October 27, 1927. He was elected with the support of the Indiana Klan and came under fire after Klan leader D. C. Stephenson was convicted of rape and murder. Duvall was convicted of violating the corrupt practices act in 1927 and resigned shortly thereafter in an unsuccessful effort to give the mayoralty to a political ally.

== Early life ==
Duvall was born on November 29, 1874, in Tazewell County, Illinois to James and Roberta Frances (McQuinn) Duvall. His father was a native of Highland County, Ohio and his mother was from Culpeper, Virginia. Duvall studied law at the Valparaiso University School of Law and the University of Chicago Law School and graduated from the latter institution in 1899.

== Legal and business career ==
Duvall established a practice in Arcadia, Indiana and served as deputy prosecutor of Hamilton County, Indiana. In 1902, he moved to Indianapolis and opened a law office.

In 1909, he organized the Haughville Bank, later known as the Citizens State Bank. In 1912, he founded the Marion County State Bank. He also organized the Northwestern State Bank, East 10th Street Bank, and the Beech Grove State Bank. His sold his banking interests to the American Fletcher National Bank in order to enter politics. He also owned and operated a real estate firm.

== Personal life ==
In 1917, Duvall married Maude Buser of Indianapolis. They had two children – J. Leslie and Margaret. Leslie Duvall followed his father into politics and was a member of the Indiana Senate from 1967 to 1985.

== Politics ==
From 1924 to 1925, Duvall served as treasurer of Marion County, Indiana. He ran in the 1925 Indianapolis mayoral election with the backing of the Indiana Klan, which was at the height of its political power. The Republican Klan ticket won all but one of the municipal primary contests. Duvall beat anti-Klan candidate Ralph Lemcke by a plurality of 5,779 votes in a three-way contest with Delbert O. Wilmeth, who finished a distant third. In the general election, he defeated Democratic nominee Walter Myers by roughly 9,000 votes.

During his tenure as mayor, Duvall laid the cornerstone to the Indiana Masonic Home in Franklin, Indiana and hosted Marie of Romania and Charles Lindbergh during their visits to the city.

In October 1926, Thomas H. Adams, editor of the Vincennes Commercial and chairman of a state committee investigating corruption in state government, produced a photostatic copy of a letter from Duvall to Klan leader D. C. Stephenson promising him control over certain city appointments in exchange for his support. The allegations came after Stephenson was convicted of the abduction, rape, and murder of Madge Oberholtzer. Duvall claimed the letter was a forgery and sued Adams and several newspaper publishers for libel. Duvall later added Stephenson to the lawsuit and Stephenson countersued, alleging that allegations against Duvall were true and his denial injured Stephenson's character. The suit and countersuit were dropped on September 6, 1927.

On October 11, 1926, a grand jury investigation into the charges began under the direction of judge James A. Collins. No indictments were returned, but the jury recommended further investigation. A new grand jury resumed the probe in January 1927, but the jury was excused after political leader James E. Armitage was found guilty of attempting to bribe one of the jurors.

On May 17, 1927, Duvall and William Buser, his brother-in-law and the city controller, were charged with violating the corrupt practices act and perjury for allegedly promising a job or the ability to make appointments in exchange for financial or political support during the 1925 primary and lying about it in sworn affidavits. Despite his embrace of the Klan, Duvall allegedly promised William Armitage, a wealthy Catholic contractor and Klan opponent, the ability make three appointments in the city government in exchange for his support and a $14,500 campaign contribution (a promise Duvall later reneged on). The investigation into the Klan also led to indictments against Governor Edward L. Jackson, his former law partner Robert I. Marsh, and Marion County Republican chairman George V. Coffin.

On September 23, 1927, Duvall was found guilty of violating the corrupt practices act. He was fined $1,000 and sentenced to 30 days in jail. Under the law, Duvall was barred from holding public office for four years following the date of the commission of the crime (November 2, 1925). However, Duvall stated he had no intention of resigning. On September 26, he appointed his wife to the position of city controller, which placed her first in the line of succession should he be removed from office.

On October 26, 1927, the Marion county attorney declared that Duvall ceased to be mayor following his conviction and advised the city and county treasurer not to honor warrants for expenditure of city funds issued by Duvall or any city appointee who came into office after his conviction, including his wife. On October 27, the Indianapolis Common Council unanimously voted to declare of offices of mayor and city controller vacant and appoint council president Claude E. Negley to be mayor pro tem. However, Ira M. Holmes, a Duvall ally, claimed that Duvall had resigned earlier that day and Maude Duvall, as acting mayor, had appointed him city controller. She resigned soon after making the appointment, which made Holmes the rightful mayor. Negely was granted a temporary restraining order barring Holmes from interfering with his duties as mayor. Holmes attempted to have the restraining order dismissed, but judge Joseph M. Milner ruled against him and Negely was allowed to serve until the city council selected someone to fill the remainder of Duvall's term. On November 9, 1927, Lemuel Ertus Slack, a Democratic attorney who previously represented the Ku Klux Klan, was elected by the city council after two Republican councilors broke with their party to end a 38-ballot stalemate. On November 18, four members of the city council were indicted for soliciting and accepting bribes from Duvall in exchange for voting against his impeachment.

== Later life and death ==
Duvall's conviction was upheld by the Indiana Court of Appeals on May 29, 1929. He appealed to the Indiana Supreme Court, which upheld the constitutionality of the corrupt practices act. He began serving his sentence on February 4, 1931, and was released on March 5.

In 1929, Duvall and his brother, Albert, purchased the Walnut Gardens resort. They constructed the Walnut Gardens Speedway, which hosted motorcycle, bicycle, dog, and motor racing from 1929 until 1934. In 1947, the property was sold to the Church of Nazarene.

In 1932, Duvall opened a law office in Indianapolis.

Duvall was a candidate in the 1934 mayoral election. He finished a distant fourth in the seven-candidate Republican primary with 170 votes.

Duvall died on February 25, 1962, at St. Vincent Indianapolis Hospital. He was buried at Crown Hill Cemetery.
