= Lemuel Ertus Slack =

American politician

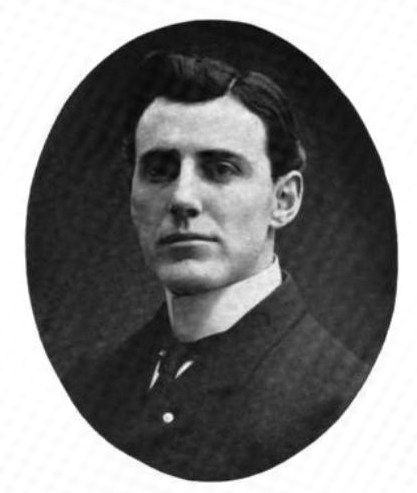

29th Mayor of Indianapolis
- In office November 9, 1927 – January 6, 1930
- Preceded by: Claude E. Negley
- Succeeded by: Reginald H. Sullivan

Member of the Indiana Senate
- In office 1906–1910

Member of the Indiana House of Representatives
- In office 1902–1906

Personal details
- Born: October 8, 1874 Nineveh Township, Johnson County, Indiana
- Died: February 24, 1952 (aged 77) Franklin, Indiana
- Resting place: Greenlawn Cemetery
- Party: Democratic
- Spouse: Mayme Shields (m. 1897, died)
- Education: Indiana Law School
- Occupation: Lawyer, politician
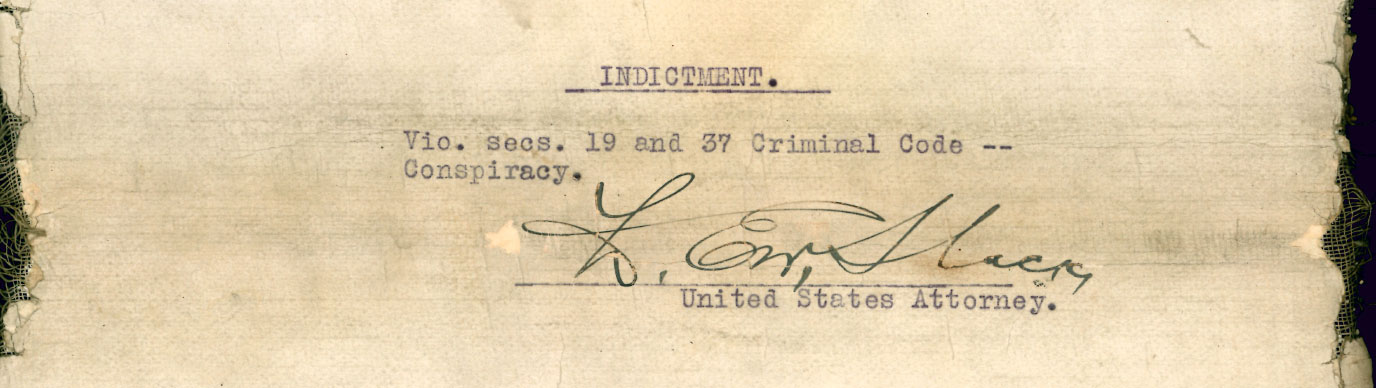
- Signature

Lemuel Ertus Slack (October 8, 1874 – February 24, 1952) often called L. Ert Slack, was an American politician and lawyer who served as the 29th mayor of Indianapolis, Indiana.

== Biography ==
Lemuel Ertus Slack was born in Nineveh Township, Johnson County, Indiana, on October 8, 1874, to Elisha O. Slack and Nancy A. Teeters, who were of Scotch-Irish ancestry. He had three sisters: Mary, Maude, and Jessie, and one brother, Henry, who died at the age of twelve years old. He attended school in Hensley Township, and had a reputation as a diligent student. He worked in a blacksmith shop during vacations.

From 1892, at the age of 17, he was employed in the Central Hospital for Insane in Indianapolis, where he remained until 1896. He began studying law on his own, and in October 1896, he entered the Indiana Law School as a senior, graduating after only a year in 1897. He was admitted to the bar in Franklin, Indiana, on September 6, 1897, and was appointed deputy prosecutor on the day of admission. On September 1, 1897, he formed a partnership with William E. Deupree under the firm name of Deupree & Slack, which lasted until November 1906.

On October 31, 1897, Slack married Mayme Shields of Columbus, Indiana. They had one child, who died in infancy. Slack was a member of the Modern Woodmen of America, Camp 2640; the Independent Order of Odd Fellows, Johnson Lodge 76; and the Knights of Pythias Lodge at Franklin. He was also affiliated with Masonic orders: Franklin Lodge 107; Franklin Chapter No 65 of the Royal Arch Masons; Franklin Commandery No 23 of the Knights Templar; Indianapolis Consistory, 32nd degree, of the Scottish Rite; and Murat Temple of the Nobles of the Mystic Shrine. Religiously, he was a member, with his wife, of the Christian Science church at Franklin.

He was a member of the Indiana House of Representatives from 1901 to 1903, a member of the Indiana Senate from 1905 to 1907, and was a candidate for governor of Indiana in 1908. He was appointed United States Attorney for Indiana from 1916 to 1920 and was Indiana's first district attorney to try violators of the federal Volstead Act. Some of the more notable cases he prosecuted were the Muncie, Indiana, fake fight fraud conspiracy case of 1919, and the Evansville, Indiana, liquor conspiracy case of 1920. At the expiration of his term in 1920, Slack returned to the private practice of law. In 1923 he represented the Ku Klux Klan in a lawsuit filed by the American Unity League, an anti-Klan organization.

In 1927, he was elected mayor of Indianapolis by the Indianapolis County Council on the 38th ballot. He filled the unexpired term of John L. Duvall, who was barred from holding public office after he was convicted of the violating the corrupt practices act. On January 30, 1928, the city council voted to rescind Slack's appointment on the basis that his appointment was illegal. Two former city controllers, Joseph L. Hogue and Ira M. Holmes, contended that they were the rightful holders of the office. On July 27, 1928, the Indiana Supreme Court upheld a lower court ruling that neither men had a right to the office. Slack served as mayor until his term ended in 1930. He was a Superior Court judge in Indiana from 1936 to 1938.

He died on February 24, 1952, in the Masonic Home in Franklin, Indiana, where he had lived in retirement for five years. He was buried at Greenlawn Cemetery in Franklin.
