= 1929 United Kingdom general election in Northern Ireland =

- 30 May 1929

13 seats in Northern Ireland of the 615 seats in the House of Commons
- Turnout: 63.8% (▼2.9 pp)

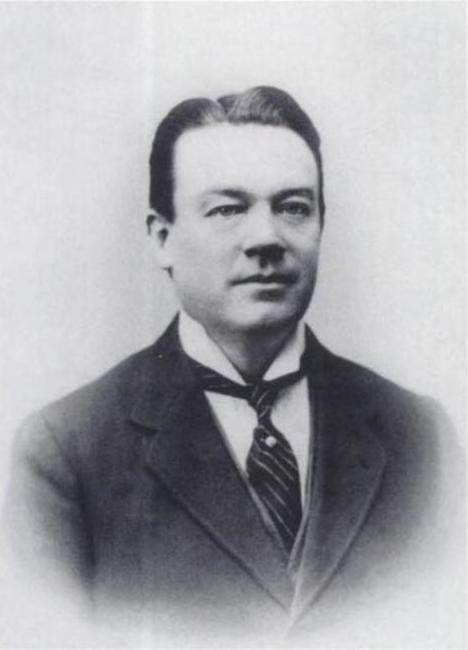
	First party	Second party
Leader	James Craig	Joe Devlin
Party	UUP	Nationalist
Alliance	Conservative
Leader since	7 June 1921	14 December 1918
Leader's seat	Did not stand	Fermanagh and Tyrone
Last election	13 seats, 83.8%	Did not stand
Seats won	11 (Note: Includes 2 members elected unopposed.)	2 (Note: Includes 2 members elected unopposed.)
Seat change	▼2	▲2
Popular vote	354,657 (Note: Voting took place in 9 of 13 seats. The other MPs were unopposed.)	24,177
Percentage	68.0%	6.6%
Swing	▼15.8%	New party

The 1929 United Kingdom general election in Northern Ireland was held on 30 May as part of the wider general election. There were ten constituencies, seven single-seat constituencies with MPs elected by FPTP and three two-seat constituencies with MPs elected by bloc voting.

As a result of the election across the United Kingdom, the Labour Party held the most seats in the House of Commons for the first time, but without an overall majority in its own right. Ramsay MacDonald returned as Prime Minister at the head of the new minority Labour Government. The Liberal Party also regained several seats from its losses in the 1924 general election and held the balance of power.

The general election was the first in which women aged 21–29 had the right to vote (owing to the Representation of the People Act 1928). Women over 30, with some property qualifications, had been able to vote since the 1918 general election, but the 1929 poll was the first general election with universal suffrage for adults over 21, which was then the age of majority.

== Candidates ==
Below is a table summarising the candidates of the 1929 general election in Northern Ireland in the county and borough constituencies, and those in Queen's University of Belfast.

Affiliation	Candidates
Ulster Unionist Party	11
Liberal Party	6
Nationalist Party	3
Independent Unionist	2 (Note: The candidates that stood were Tommy Henderson in Belfast North and Philip James Woods in Belfast South.)
Temperance Unionist and Local Optometrist	1 (Note: Candidates David Wilson stood in Belfast North.)
Total	23

== Results ==
The Nationalist Party ran in this election, having not contested the previous election in 1924. It regained the two seats in Fermanagh and Tyrone it had held from 1922 to 1924.

In the election as a whole, the Conservative Party, which included the Ulster Unionists, led by Stanley Baldwin, lost its majority and the Labour Party formed a minority government with Ramsay MacDonald as Prime Minister.

Party	Leader	Candidates	Seats					Aggregate votes		
Party	Leader	Candidates	Total	Gains	Losses	Net	Of total (%)	Total	Of total (%) (Note: Adjusted for multi-member constituencies.)	Change (%)
UUP	James; Craig	11	11	0	2	▼2	84.6	354,657	68.0	▼15.8
Liberal	David Lloyd; George	6	0	Did not stand in 1924			—	100,103	16.8	—N/a
Independent Unionist	—N/a	2	0	0	0	Steady	—	25,057	6.9	▲6.7
Nationalist	Joseph; Devlin	3	2	Did not stand in 1924		▲2	15.4	24,177	6.6	—N/a
Temperance Unionist	—N/a	1	0	New			—	6,059	1.7	New
Total		23	13			0	100.0	510,053	100.0	0.0
Registered voters, and turnout								571,957 (Note: Electorate in contested constituencies. The total electorate was 771,946.)	63.8	▼2.9

Popular vote
UUP	68.0%
Liberal	16.8%
Ind. Unionist	6.9%
National	6.6%
Temp. Unionist	1.7%

Parliamentary seats
UUP	84.6%
Ind. Unionist	15.4%

== MPs elected ==
Constituency	Party	MP
Antrim	Ulster Unionist	Sir Joseph McConnell, Bt
Antrim	Ulster Unionist	Hugh O'Neill
Armagh	Ulster Unionist	William Allen
Belfast East	Ulster Unionist	Herbert Dixon
Belfast North	Ulster Unionist	Thomas Somerset
Belfast South	Ulster Unionist	William Stewart
Belfast West	Ulster Unionist	William Allen
Down	Ulster Unionist	David Reid
Down	Ulster Unionist	John Simms
Fermanagh and Tyrone	Nationalist Party	Joseph Devlin
Fermanagh and Tyrone	Nationalist Party	Thomas Harbison
Londonderry	Ulster Unionist	Ronald Ross
Queen's University of Belfast	Ulster Unionist	Thomas Sinclair

=== By-election ===
By-election	Date	Incumbent	Party	Winner	Party	Cause
Fermanagh and Tyrone	7 March 1931	Thomas Harbison	Nationalist	Cahir Healy	Nationalist	Death

== See also ==
- 1929 United Kingdom general election in England
- 1929 United Kingdom general election in Scotland
- 1929 United Kingdom general election in Wales
