= Greenlawn Cemetery (Franklin, Indiana) =

- U.S. National Register of Historic Places
- U.S. Historic district
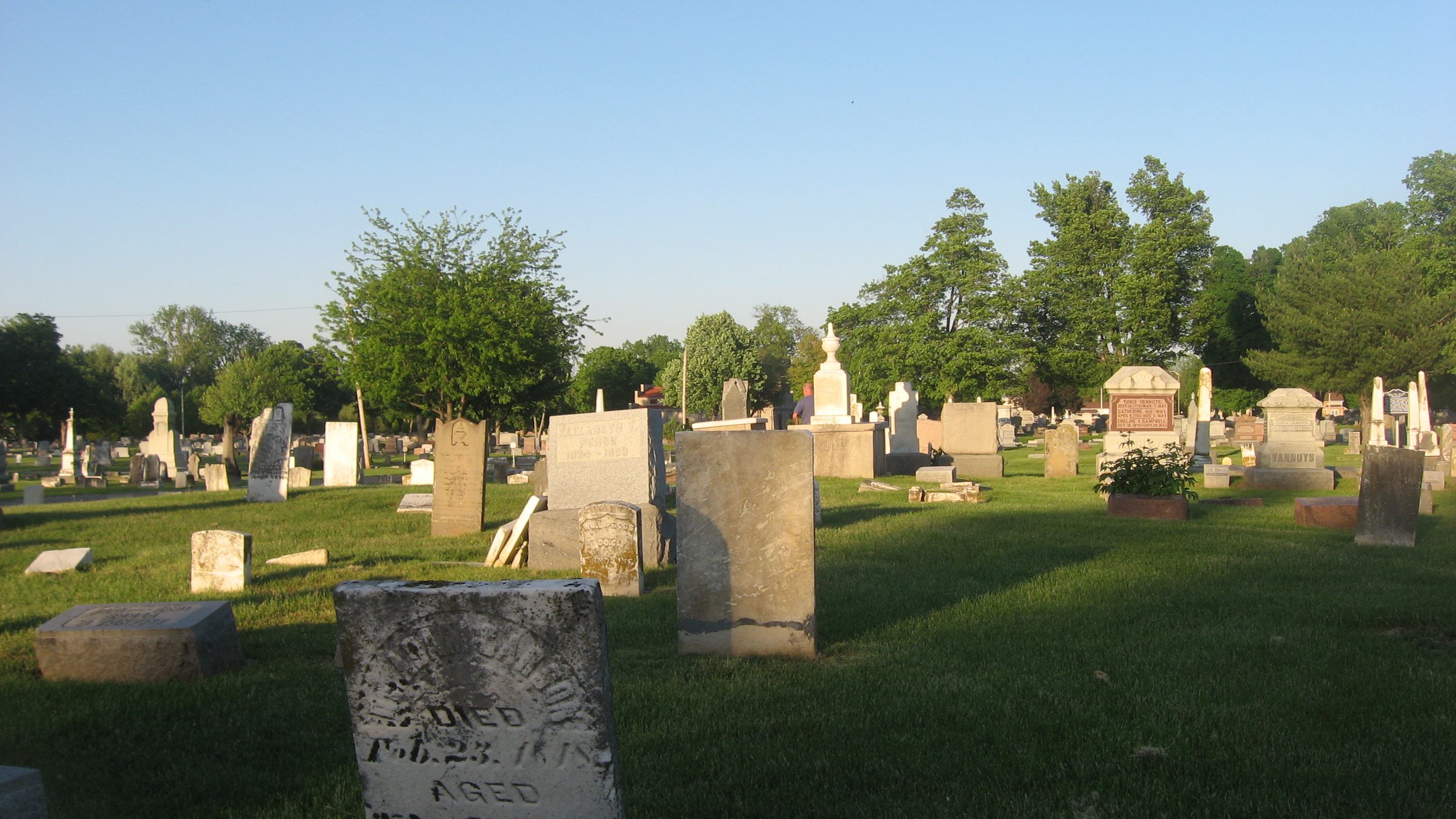
- Greenlawn Cemetery, May 2013

- Location within Indiana Location within the United States
- Location: 100 W. South St., Franklin, Indiana
- Coordinates: 39°28′40″N 86°03′36″W
- Area: 30 acres (12 ha)
- Architectural style: Gothic Revival, Romanesque
- NRHP reference No.: 13000421
- Added to NRHP: June 25, 2013

Greenlawn Cemetery is a historic city-owned cemetery and national historic district located at Franklin, Indiana. It is a landscape-lawn style cemetery established in 1845, and contains roughly 15,000 burials. Located in the cemetery is a small Gothic Revival style chapel (1878, now cemetery office) and the Romanesque Revival Main Mausoleum (1911).

Notable burials at Greenlawn include US Congressman William W. Wick (1796–1868), Governor Roger D. Branigin (1902–1975), Mayor Lemuel Ertus Slack (1874–1952), and Hall of Fame basketball player Fuzzy Vandivier (1903–1983).

It was listed on the National Register of Historic Places in 2013.
