= 1929 Virginia lieutenant gubernatorial election =

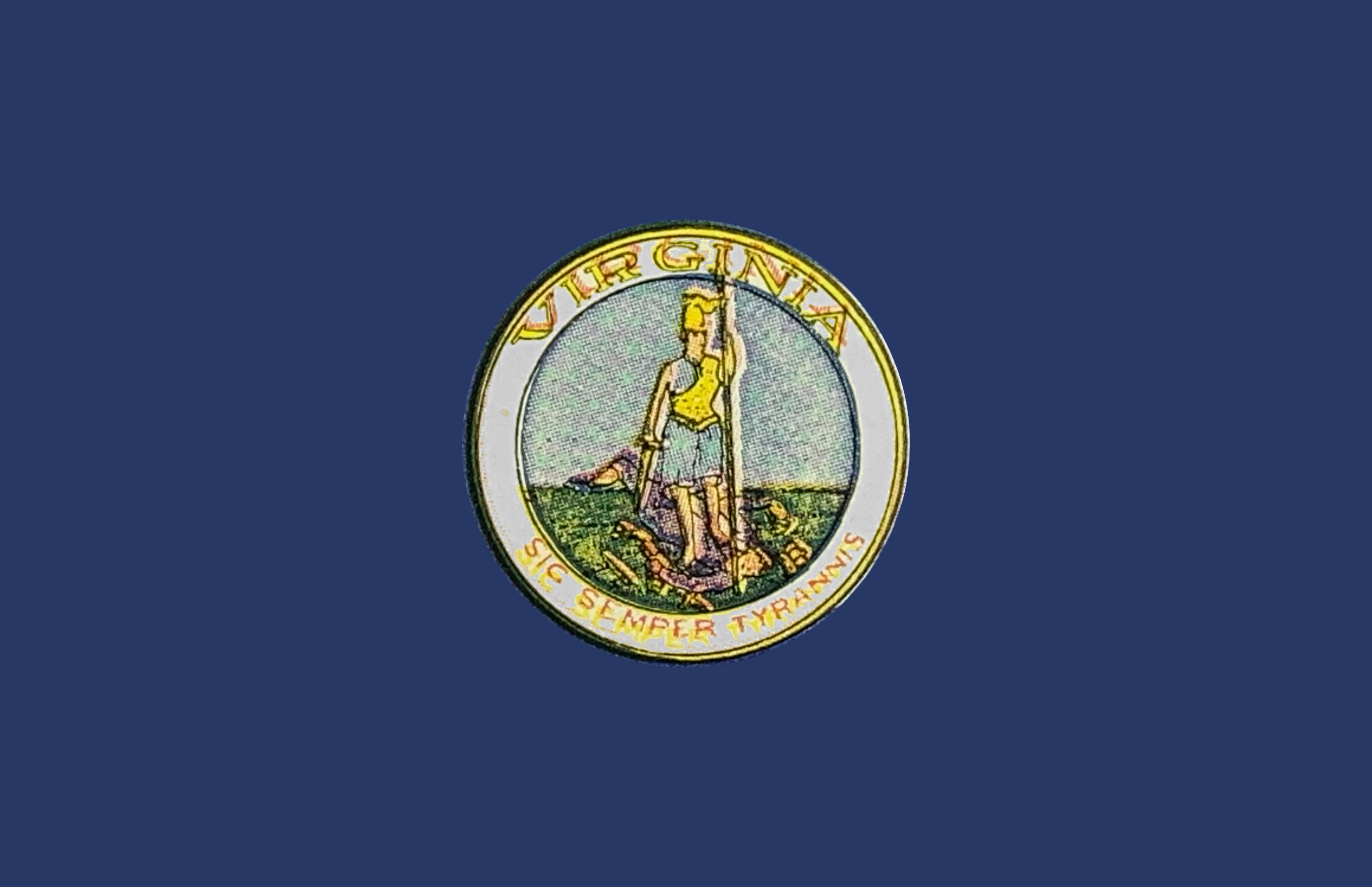
- November 5, 1929
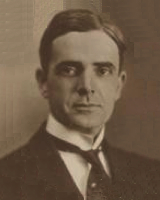

Nominee	James Hubert Price	C. B. Jones
Party	Democratic	Republican
Popular vote	184,563	103,758
Percentage	64.01%	35.99%
- County and independent city results Price: 50–60% 60–70% 70–80% 80–90% >90% Jones: 50–60% 60–70%
Lieutenant Governor before election
Junius Edgar West
Democratic
Elected Lieutenant Governor
James Hubert Price
Democratic

The 1929 Virginia lieutenant gubernatorial election was held on November 5, 1929, to elect the lieutenant governor of Virginia. Democratic nominee and incumbent member of the Virginia House of Delegates James Hubert Price defeated Republican nominee C. B. Jones.

== General election ==
On election day, November 5, 1929, Democratic nominee James Hubert Price won the election by a margin of 80,805 votes against his opponent Republican nominee C. B. Jones, thereby retaining Democratic control over the office of lieutenant governor. Price was sworn in as the 23rd lieutenant governor of Virginia on January 20, 1930.

=== Results ===
Virginia lieutenant gubernatorial election, 1929
Party	Candidate	Votes	%
Democratic	James Hubert Price	184,563	64.01
Republican	C. B. Jones	103,758	35.99
Total votes		288,321	100.00
Democratic hold			
