= 1929 Guatemalan parliamentary election =

Parliamentary elections were held in Guatemala in December 1929 in order to elect half of the legislature. 33 of the 39 deputies elected were supporters of president Lázaro Chacón González.
