= 1929 Virginia gubernatorial election =

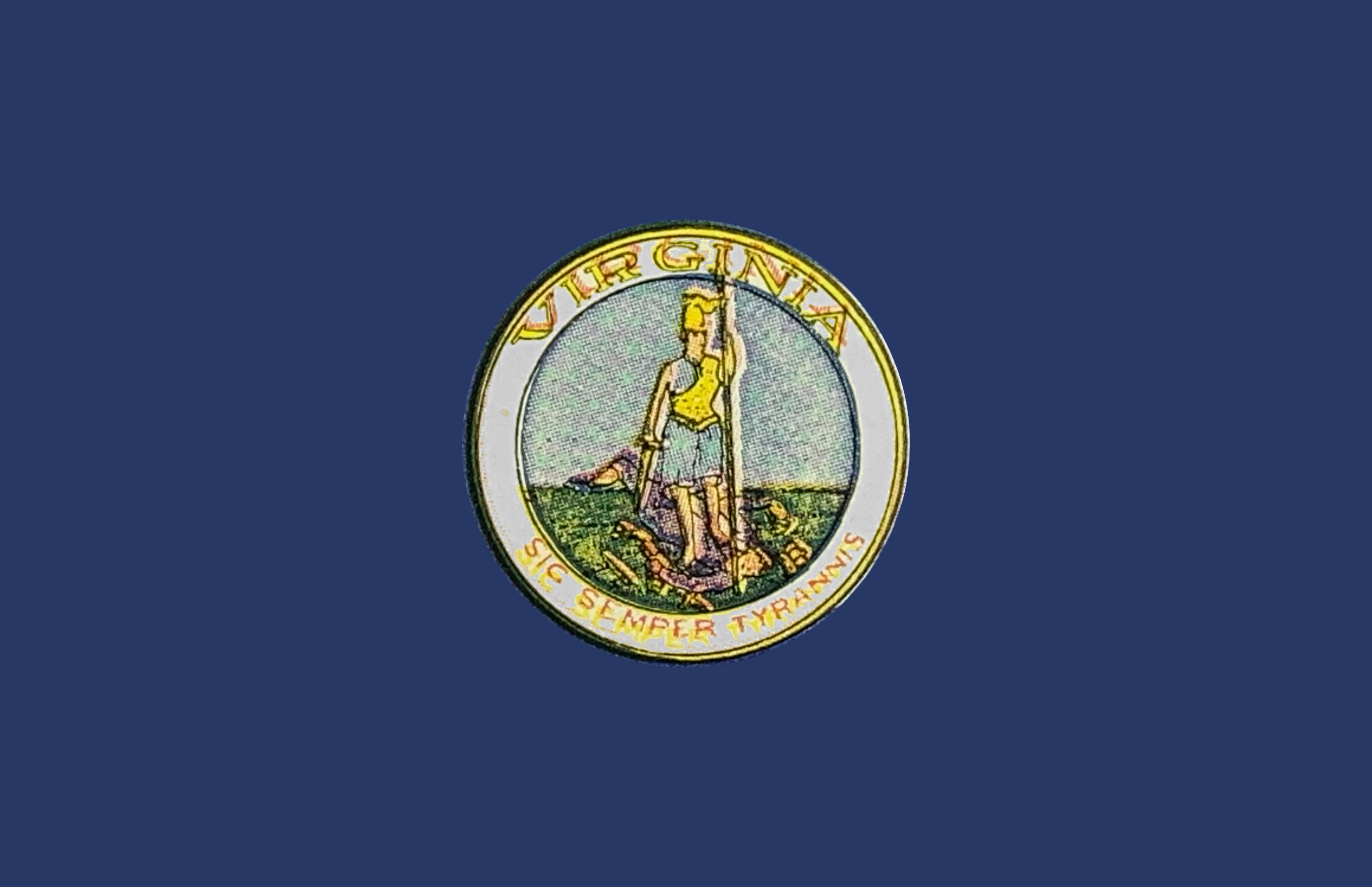
- November 5, 1929
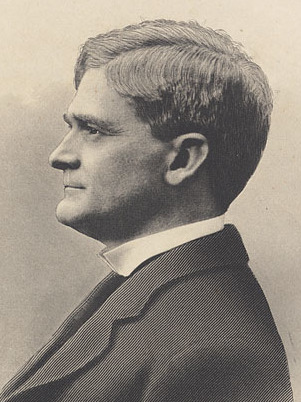

Nominee	John Garland Pollard	William Moseley Brown
Party	Democratic	Republican
Popular vote	169,329	99,650
Percentage	62.78%	36.95%
- County and independent city results Pollard: 50–60% 60–70% 70–80% 80–90% >90% Brown: 50–60% 60–70%
Governor before election
Harry F. Byrd
Democratic
Elected Governor
John Garland Pollard
Democratic

The 1929 Virginia gubernatorial election was held on November 5, 1929, to elect the governor of Virginia.

== Results ==
Virginia gubernatorial election, 1929
Party	Candidate	Votes	%
Democratic	John Garland Pollard	169,329	62.78%
Republican	William Moseley Brown	99,650	36.95%
Socialist	John J. Kafka	460	0.17%
Independent	W. A. Rowe	289	0.11%
Total votes		269,728	100.00%
Democratic hold			
