= 1929 United Kingdom general election =

- 30 May 1929

All 615 seats in the House of Commons 308 seats needed for a majority
- Registered: 28,854,746
- Turnout: 22,648,375; 76.3% (▼0.7 pp)
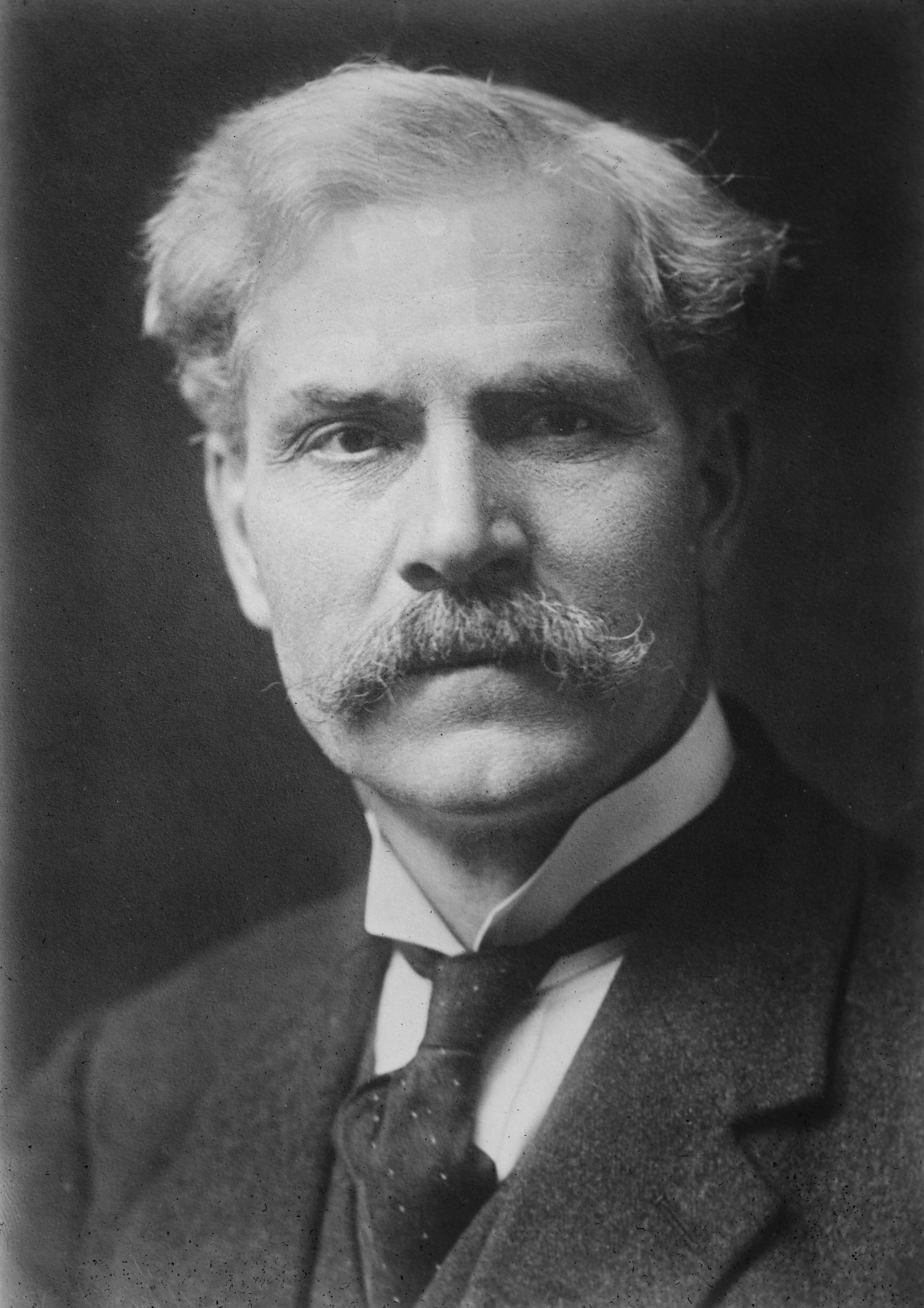

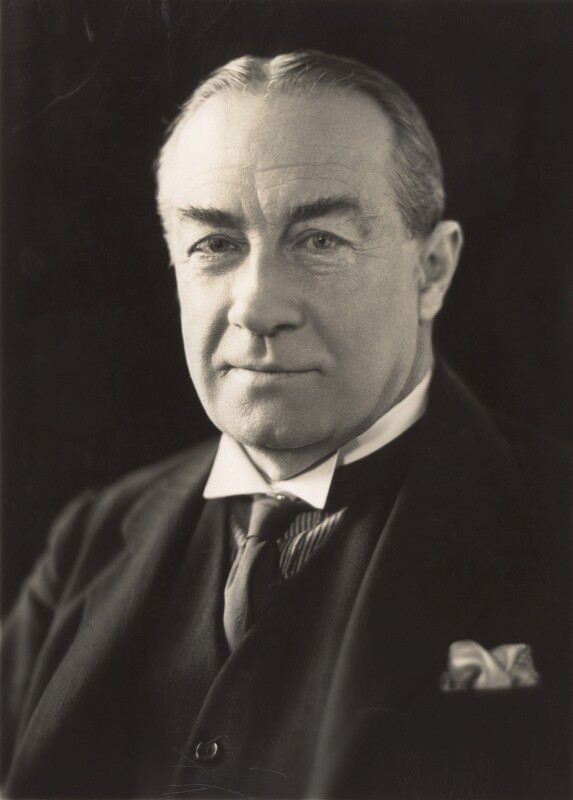

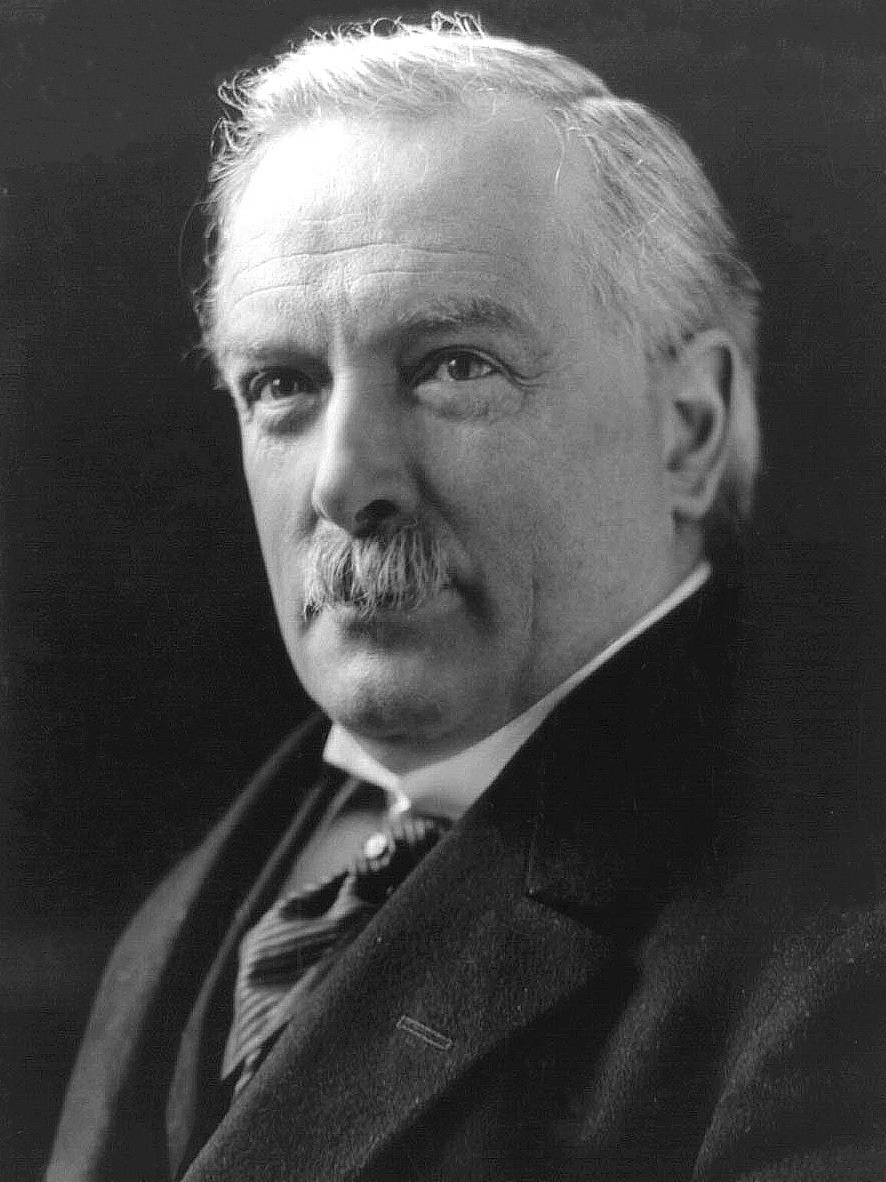
	First party	Second party	Third party
Leader	Ramsay MacDonald	Stanley Baldwin	David Lloyd George
Party	Labour	Conservative	Liberal
Leader since	21 November 1922	23 May 1923	14 October 1926
Leader's seat	Seaham	Bewdley	Caernarvon Boroughs
Last election	151 seats, 33.3%	412 seats, 46.8%	40 seats, 17.8%
Seats won	287	260 (Note: Figure includes Speaker of the House of Commons Edward FitzRoy in Daventry.)	59
Seat change	▲136	▼152	▲19
Popular vote	8,370,417	8,656,225	5,308,738
Percentage	37.1%	38.1%	23.5%
Swing	▲3.8 pp	▼8.7 pp	▲5.7 pp
- Colours denote the winning party—as shown in § Results

- Diagram displaying the composition of the House of Commons following the election
Prime Minister before election
Stanley Baldwin
Conservative
Prime Minister after election
Ramsay MacDonald
Labour

A general election was held in the United Kingdom on Thursday 30 May 1929, after the previous Parliament was dissolved on 10 May. It resulted in a hung parliament: the Conservative Party, led by Prime Minister Stanley Baldwin, won the most votes, but Ramsay MacDonald's Labour Party won the most seats in the House of Commons. This marked the first election where Labour emerged as the largest party, though they failed to win a majority. The Liberal Party, led again by former Prime Minister David Lloyd George, regained some of the ground lost in 1924 and held the balance of power.

The election was often referred to as the "Flapper Election", because it was the first in which women aged 21–29 had the right to vote (owing to the Representation of the People Act 1928). Women over 30, with some property qualifications, had been able to vote since the 1918 general election, but the 1929 vote was the first general election with universal suffrage for adults over 21, which was then the age of majority.

The election was fought against a background of rising unemployment, with the memory of the 1926 general strike still fresh in voters' minds. By 1929, the Cabinet was being described by many as "old and exhausted".

The Liberals campaigned on a comprehensive programme of public works under the title "We Can Conquer Unemployment". There was anticipation of a potential revival of the Liberal Party after the reunification of Independent Liberals and National Liberals now under Lloyd George's leadership since 1926 and following some victories in a series of recent by-elections after 1926. The incumbent Conservatives campaigned on the theme of "Safety First", with Labour campaigning on the theme of "Labour & the Nation".

This was the first general election to be contested by the newly formed Welsh nationalist party Plaid Cymru.

It stood as the last time when a third party polled more than one-fifth of the popular vote until 1983. The Liberals performed more successfully than at the previous general election in 1924, but could not regain their pre-World War I status as a party of government.

== Results ==
=== Summary of seats returned ===
Party	Leader	MPs		Aggregate votes	
Party	Leader		Of total		Of total (Note: Adjusted for multi-member constituencies.)
Labour Party	Ramsay MacDonald	287 (Note: Includes 9 Co-operative Party MPs, as part of the Labour-Co-op alliance.)	46.7%	8,370,417	37.1%
Conservative and Unionist Party	Stanley Baldwin	260	42.3%	8,656,225	38.1%
Conservative Party (Note: Results for England and Wales.)	Stanley Baldwin	227	36.9%	7,493,791	33.4%
Unionist Party	John Craik-Henderson	22	3.6%	807,777	3.6%
Ulster Unionist Party	James Craig	11	1.8%	354,657	1.1%
Liberal Party	David Lloyd George	59	9.6%	5,308,738	23.5%
Independent	—N/a	4	0.7%	89,952	0.4%
Scottish Prohibition Party	Edwin Scrymgeour	1	0.2%	50,073	0.1%
Nationalist Party	Joseph Devlin	2	0.3%	24,177	0.1%
Independent Labour	Joseph Devlin	1	0.2%	19,770	0.1%
Irish Nationalist	T. P. O'Connor	1	0.2%	0	0.0%

=== Full Results ===

Results of the October 1924 general election to the House of Commons of the United Kingdom
Party	Leader	Candidates	MPs					Aggregate votes		
Party	Leader	Candidates	Total	Gains	Losses	Net	Of total (%)	Total	Of total (%) (Note: Adjusted for multi-member constituencies.)	Change (%)
Conservative (Note: Figure includes the Unionist Party and the Ulster Unionist Party under their nation affiliations with the Conservative Party.)	Stanley; Baldwin	590	260	2	154	▼152	42.3	8,656,225	38.1	▼8.7
Labour	Ramsay; MacDonald	569 (Note: Includes 12 Co-operative Party candidates, as part of the Labour-Co-op alliance.)	287 (Note: Includes 9 Co-operative Party MPs, as part of the Labour-Co-op alliance.)	142 (Note: Includes 4 Co-operative Party MPs, as part of the Labour-Co-op alliance.)	6	▲136	46.7 (Note: Includes 1.5% for the Co-operative Party, as part of the Labour-Co-op alliance.)	8,370,417 (Note: Includes 208,762 for the Co-operative Party, as part of the Labour-Co-op alliance.)	37.1 (Note: Includes 1.0% for the Co-operative Party, as part of the Labour-Co-op alliance.)	▲3.8 (Note: Includes ▲0.2% for the Co-operative Party, as part of the Labour-Co-op alliance.)
Liberal	David Lloyd George	513	59	34	15	▲19	9.6	5,308,738	23.5	▲5.7
Independent	—N/a	11	4	3	1	▲2	0.8	89,952	0.4	▲0.2
Communist	Harry; Pollitt	25	0	0	1 (Note: Shapurji Saklatvala in Battersea North.)	▼1	—	50,634	0.2	▼0.1
Independent; Unionist	—N/a	8	0	0	0	Steady	—	46,278	0.2	▲0.2
Scottish; Prohibition	Edwin Scrymgeour	1	1 (Note: Edwin Scrymgeour in Dundee.)	0	0	Steady	0.2	50,073	0.1	Steady
Nationalist	Joseph; Devlin	3	2	Did not stand in 1924		▲2	0.3	24,177	0.1	—N/a
Independent; Liberal	—N/a	2	0	0	0	Steady	—	21,287	0.1	▲0.1
Independent; Labour	—N/a	3	1 (Note: Neil Maclean in Glasgow Govan.)	Did not stand in 1924		▲1	0.2	19,770	0.1	—N/a
Scottish Protestant League	Alexander; Ratcliffe	1 (Note: Leader Alexander Ratcliffe stood in Stirling and Falkirk.)	0	New			—	6,902	0.0	new
National (Scotland)	Roland; Muirhead	2	0	New			—	3,313	0.0	new
Plaid Cymru	Saunders; Lewis	1 (Note: Founder Lewis Valentine stood in Caernarvonshire.)	0	New			—	3,313	0.0	new
Irish Nationalist	T. P. O'Connor	1	1 (Note: T. P. O'Connor in Liverpool Scotland.)	0	0	Steady	0.2	0	0.0	▼0.1
Total		1,730	615			0	100.0	22,648,375	100.0	0.0
Registered voters, and turnout								28.854,746 (Note: Including the electorate in uncontested constituencies.)	76.3 (Note: Adjusted for multi-member constituencies.)	▼0.7

=== Votes summary ===
Popular vote
Conservative	38.06%
Labour	37.12%
Liberal	23.54%
Others	1.28%

=== Seats summary ===
Parliamentary seats
Labour	46.67%
Conservative	42.28%
Liberal	9.59%
Others	1.46%

== Transfers of seats ==
- All comparisons are with the 1924 election.
  - In some cases, the change is due to the MP's having defected to the gaining party, and then retaining the seat in 1929. Such circumstances are marked with a *.
  - In other circumstances, the change is due to the seat's having been won by the gaining party in a by-election in the intervening years, and then retained in 1929. Such circumstances are marked with a †.

To	From	No.	Seats
Independent Labour	Labour	1	Govan*
Labour	Communist	1	Battersea North
Labour	Liberal	15	Chesterfield, South Shields, Walthamstow West, Bristol North, Bristol South, Kingston upon Hull Central*, Blackburn (one of two), Oldham (one of two), Hackney South, Lambeth North, Bradford East, Batley and Morley, Wrexham, Carmarthen, Swansea West
Labour	Constitutionalist	3	Walthamstow East^{1}, Accrington^{2}, Stoke^{2}
Labour	Conservative	121	Stirlingshire West, Dunbartonshire, Lanark, Partick, Lanarkshire North†, Renfrewshire West, Maryhill, Kilmarnock, Edinburgh West, Linlithgow†, Berwick & Haddington, Reading, Birkenhead West, Crewe, Stalybridge and Hyde, Stockport (one of two)†, Carlisle, Whitehaven, Derby (one of two), Belper, Derbyshire South, Drake, Barnard Castle, Sedgefield, Darlington†, Stockton-on-Tees, Sunderland (both seats), Leyton East, East Ham North, Essex SE, Leyton West, Romford, Upton, Bristol Central, Portsmouth Central, Southampton (both seats), Dudley, Stourbridge†, Kingston upon Hull East, Kingston upon Hull South West, Chatham, Dartford, Blackburn (one of two), Ormskirk, Rossendale, Ashton-under-Lyne†, Bolton (both seats), Eccles, Hulme, Oldham (one of two), Salford North, Salford South, Salford West, Bootle, Everton, Kirkdale, Warrington, Widnes, Leicester East, Loughborough, Brigg, Fulham West, Hammersmith South, Islington North, Kensington North, Battersea South†, Greenwich, Islington East, Camberwell North-West, Hackney Central, Kennington, Hammersmith North†, St Pancras North, St Pancras South East, St Pancras South West, Wandsworth Central, Norfolk South West, Norwich (one of two), Kettering, Northampton†, Peterborough, Bassetlaw, Nottingham South, The Wrekin, Frome, Lichfield, Walsall, Wolverhampton West, Nuneaton, Duddeston, Coventry, Aston, Deritend, Erdington, Ladywood, Yardley, Swindon, York, Cleveland, Acton, Enfield, Tottenham South, Sheffield Central, Bradford North, Leeds Central, Sowerby, Wakefield, Sheffield Park, Bradford Central, Pontefract, Newport (Monmouthshire), Brecon and Radnor, Llandaff & Barry, Cardiff Central, Cardiff East, Cardiff South
Labour	Speaker	1	Halifax†
Labour	Independent	1	Mossley
Labour gains:		142	
Liberal	Labour	2	Bethnal Green North-East, Newcastle upon Tyne East
Liberal	Constitutionalist	2	Camborne, Heywood and Radcliffe*
Liberal	Conservative	32	Banff, Aberdeenshire West and Kincardine, Fife East, Dumfriesshire, Galloway, Bedfordshire Mid, Luton, Huntingdonshire, Isle of Ely, Birkenhead East, Eddisbury, Bodmin, Cornwall North, Penryn and Falmouth, St Ives†, South Molton, Dorset East, Harwich, Hereford, Ashford, Darwen, Preston (one of two), Blackley, Withington, Bosworth†, Holland with Boston†, Great Yarmouth, Norfolk East, Nottingham East, Eye, Flintshire, Pembrokeshire
Liberal gains:		36	
Conservative	Labour	1	King's Norton
Conservative	Constitutionalist	1	Epping*
Conservative gains:		2	
Independent	Constitutionalist	1	Stretford*
Independent	Conservative	2	Combined English Universities (one of two), Exeter*
Nationalist	UUP	2	Fermanagh and Tyrone (both seats)

^{1} Previous MP had defected to the Conservatives by the 1929 election
^{2} Previous MP had defected to the Liberals by the 1929 election

== See also ==
- List of MPs elected in the 1929 United Kingdom general election
- 1929 United Kingdom general election in England
- 1929 United Kingdom general election in Scotland
- 1929 United Kingdom general election in Wales
- 1929 United Kingdom general election in Northern Ireland
- Constituency election results in the 1929 United Kingdom general election

== Note list ==
=== Sources ===
- Craig, F. W. S. (1989), British Electoral Facts: 1832–1987, Dartmouth: Gower, ISBN 0900178302
- Doerr, Paul W. (1998), British foreign policy 1919–1939, Manchester: Manchester University Press, ISBN 0719046718
