= Nationalist Party (Northern Ireland) election results =

UK political party election results

This article lists the Nationalist Party of Northern Ireland's election results in UK parliamentary elections.

== Summary of general election performance ==
Year	Number of Candidates	Total votes	Average votes per candidate	% UK vote	% NI vote	Change (percentage points)	Saved deposits	Number of MPs (out of NI total)
1931	3	72,530	24,177	0.4	?	+0.3	3	2 / 13
1935	2	50,747	25,374	0.2	?	−0.1	3	2 / 13
1945	3	92,819	30,940	0.2	?	0.0	3	2 / 13
1950	2	65,211	32,606	0.2	11.6	0.0	2	2 / 12
1951	1	32,717	32,717	0.1	?	−0.1	1	1 / 12
1966	1	22,167	22,167	0.1	?	N/A	1	0 / 12

== Election results ==
=== 1922 general election ===
Constituency	Candidate	Votes	%	Position
Fermanagh and Tyrone	Thomas Harbison	45,236	27.0	1
Fermanagh and Tyrone	Cahir Healy	44,817	26.8	2

=== 1923 general election ===
Constituency	Candidate	Votes	%	Position
Fermanagh and Tyrone	Thomas Harbison	44,003	27.0	1
Fermanagh and Tyrone	Cahir Healy	43,668	26.8	2

=== 1929 general election ===
Constituency	Candidate	Votes	%	Position
Fermanagh and Tyrone	Joseph Devlin	unopposed	N/A	1
Fermanagh and Tyrone	Thomas Harbison	unopposed	N/A	2

=== 1931 general election ===
Constituency	Candidate	Votes	%	Position
Belfast West	Thomas Joseph Campbell	22,006	41.4	2
Fermanagh and Tyrone	Joseph Devlin	50,650	26.5	1
Fermanagh and Tyrone	Cahir Healy	50,603	26.1	2

=== By-elections, 1931–35 ===
Election	Candidate	Votes	%	Position
1934 Fermanagh and Tyrone by-election	Joe Stewart	28,790	61.4	1

=== 1935 general election ===
Constituency	Candidate	Votes	%	Position
Fermanagh and Tyrone	Patrick Cunningham	50,891	26.2	1
Fermanagh and Tyrone	Anthony Mulvey	50,603	26.1	2

=== 1945 general election ===
Constituency	Candidate	Votes	%	Position
Fermanagh and Tyrone	Patrick Cunningham	55,373	27.3	1
Fermanagh and Tyrone	Anthony Mulvey	55,144	27.1	2
Londonderry	Denis Cavanagh	37,561	47.4	2

=== 1950 general election ===
Constituency	Candidate	Votes	%	Position
Fermanagh and South Tyrone	Cahir Healy	32,188	51.9	1
Mid Ulster	Anthony Mulvey	33,023	52.6	1

=== 1951 general election ===
Constituency	Candidate	Votes	%	Position
Fermanagh and South Tyrone	Cahir Healy	32,717	52.1	1

=== 1966 general election ===
Constituency	Candidate	Votes	%	Position
Londonderry	Paddy Gormley	22,167	37.1	2
