= List of Nationalist Party MPs (Ireland) =

This is a list of Nationalist Party MPs. It includes all members of Parliament elected to the British House of Commons representing the Nationalist Party (Ireland) since 1918. Members of the Northern Ireland House of Commons are not listed. Some Nationalist MPs did not take their seats.

Member	Constituency	Years served	Notes
Patrick Cunningham	Fermanagh and Tyrone	1935–1950	
Joseph Devlin	North Kilkenny; Belfast West; Belfast Falls; Fermanagh and Tyrone	1902–1906; 1906–1918; 1918–1922; 1929–1934	
Patrick Donnelly	Armagh South	1918–1922	
Thomas Harbison	East Tyrone; North East Tyrone; Fermanagh and Tyrone	1918; 1918–1922; 1922–1924; 1929–1931	
Cahir Healy	Fermanagh and Tyrone; Fermanagh and South Tyrone	1922–1924; 1931–1935; 1950–1955	
Edward Kelly	Donegal East	Jan 1910–1922	
Jeremiah McVeagh	Down South	1902–1922	
Anthony Mulvey	Fermanagh and Tyrone; Mid Ulster	1935–1950; 1950–1951	
T. P. O'Connor	Liverpool Scotland	1885–1929	
William Redmond	East Tyrone; Waterford City	Dec 1910–1918; 1918–1922	
Joseph Francis Stewart	Fermanagh and Tyrone	1934–1935	
