= 1973 Londonderry City Council election =

Local govt election in Northern Ireland

← 1967	30 May 1973	1977 →

All 27 seats to Londonderry City Council
	First party	Second party	Third party
Leader	Raymond McClean	Jack Allen	Ivor Canavan
Party	SDLP	United Loyalist	Alliance
Leader's seat	Londonderry D	Londonderry E	Londonderry E
Seats before	N/A	12	N/A
Seats won	10	9	4
Seat change	▲10	▼3	▲4
	Fourth party	Fifth party
Leader	Fergus McAteer	Michael Montgomery
Party	Nationalist	Republican Clubs
Leader's seat	Londonderry E	Londonderry C
Seats before	8	N/A
Seats won	3	1
Seat change	▼5	▲1
- Map of the results by electoral area. Electoral areas are shaded according to the party that received the most votes. Circles represent the political affiliation of councillors elected for each electoral area.
Council control before election
Londonderry Development Commission
Council control after election
No overall control

The 1973 Londonderry City Council election took place on 30 May 1973 to elect members of Londonderry City Council in Northern Ireland. This was on the same day as other Northern Irish local elections. The campaign was significant in that, following changes to the election process and districts, Irish nationalist parties were able to take control of the council for the first time.

== Background ==
The election was the first held since the Londonderry Corporation had been reorganised under the Local Government (Boundaries) Act (Northern Ireland) 1971 following accusations of gerrymandering from the Corporation. The vote was also the first to use the single transferable vote method of election for Londonderry council elections.

During the elections, the Ulster Unionist Party (UUP), Democratic Unionist Party (DUP), and Vanguard Unionist Progressive Party joined forces as The United Loyalist Group for the Londonderry City Council elections. The group also claimed the backing of the Loyalist Association of Workers, the Ulster Protestant Volunteers, and the Ulster Special Constabulary Association. It was jointly chaired by Gerard Glover, chair of the City of Londonderry and Foyle Unionist Association, and Gordon Hegarty, a parliamentary agent for the DUP. It was initially unclear whether the coalition had the backing of the UUP headquarters, but Jim Bailie, the party secretary, stated that "I am sure whatever they are doing is all right by me". The group had a four point programme: total defeat of the Irish Republican Army, control of the police to be given to the Northern Ireland Assembly, increased representation of Northern Ireland in the Westminster Parliament, and opposition to a Council of Ireland. The group took over the local headquarters of the UUP, on Kennedy Place.

The nationalist Social Democratic and Labour Party (SDLP) contested Londonderry City Council elections for the first time since being established in 1970 in protest against abstentionism policies from the Nationalist Party. It stood 19 candidates, the most of any party in the election.

The Alliance Party of Northern Ireland stood 15 candidates, while the Derry Republican Club, backed by the Official Irish Republican Army (OIRA) stood 12, as did the United Loyalists. The Nationalist Party stood 10, including Fergus McAteer, son of the party leader, while there was a single Northern Ireland Labour Party candidate. Independent candidates included Brendan Duddy, a local fish-and-chip shop owner, and Finbar O'Doherty, a law student.

== Campaign ==
During the campaign, the British Army reduced its foot patrols in the city, arguing that this would help create an atmosphere in which people would feel confident to go and vote. The Provisional Irish Republican Army (PIRA) did not conduct any bombings in the week leading up to the vote, an unusually long lull for the period. The group also went door-to-door, calling for a boycott of the election.

The day before the election, the PIRA and OIRA announced a surprising joint initiative of protest marches, strikes and the creation of "no-go areas" for police, in protest at internment, but coming at such a late point in the campaign, the Irish Times contended that it would have little effect on the vote.

The Republican Clubs published a half-page advert in the Derry Journal, claiming that both the SDLP and the Nationalist Party had broken pledges not to contest local elections until all internees had been released. John Hume, deputy leader of the SDLP, claimed that the party's pledge was specific to the period when the Parliament of Northern Ireland had existed. The Alliance Party accused Hume of having only visited Shantallow twice since he was elected to represent it in 1969, but Hume argued that he had visited it on numerous occasions, and had three volunteers running an advice centre in the district. Hume claimed that the Alliance Party's candidates were unionists and were "yesterday's men".

The Nationalist Party argued that the SDLP was standing too many candidates, risking splitting the nationalist vote and thereby allowing the unionists to win more seats. It campaigned for the council to work closely with tenants' and other community groups, and for the council to move away from party politics.

Hume claimed that the SDLP would do "very well", but would not be drawn on whether it would achieve a majority on the council, while Hegarty of the United Loyalists thought that it would win 10 seats. The Alliance Party focused its campaign on relieving unemployment and building new leisure, health, and community facilities, and believed it would win 7 or 8 seats. The Republican Club would not speculate on how many seats it would win, but Mickey Doherty claimed that it would take a "fairly substantial vote and surprise a lot of people".

== Election results ==
The Irish Times reported the city as having particularly high turnout, initially estimated as between 65 and 70%. The count was the slowest in the whole of Northern Ireland.

Below is a list of the results:

Party	Seats	±	First Pref. votes	FPv%	±%
SDLP	10		11,008	32.4	
United Loyalist	9		12,483	36.8	
Alliance	4		4,930	14.5	
Nationalist	3		2,850	8.4	
Republican Clubs	1		2,091	6.2	
Independent	0		425	1.3	
NI Labour	0		88	0.3	
Ind. Republican	0		71	0.2	
Totals	27		34,625	100.0	—

== Districts summary ==
Results of the Londonderry City Council election, 1973 by district
Ward	%	Cllrs	%	Cllrs	%	Cllrs	%	Cllrs	%	Cllrs	Total Cllrs
Ward	SDLP		Alliance		Nationalist		RC		Others		Total Cllrs
Area A	32.2	2	12.2	1	1.7	0	2.6	0	51.3	3	6
Area B	18.3	1	17.0	1	4.3	0	2.2	0	58.2	3	5
Area C	49.3	3	13.4	0	21.4	1	15.9	1	0.0	0	6
Area D	40.1	2	13.4	1	11.3	1	8.6	0	26.6	1	5
Area E	31.1	2	15.8	1	9.2	1	6.1	0	37.8	2	6
Total	32.4	10	14.5	4	8.4	3	6.2	1	38.5	9	27

== Districts results ==
=== Area A ===
1973: 3 x United Loyalist, 2 x SDLP, 1 x Alliance

Londonderry Area A - 6 seats
Party	Candidate	FPv%	Count								
Party	Candidate	FPv%	1	2	3	4	5	6	7	8	9
United Loyalist	Thomas Craig	15.66%	1,294								
United Loyalist	Robert Bond	13.63%	1,126	1,160.56	1,163.72	1,163.72	1,172.96	1,189.96			
SDLP	George Peoples	10.64%	879	879.08	884.08	912.08	965.08	1,018.08	1,192.08		
United Loyalist	Robinson	11.62%	960	1,014.64	1,020.64	1,020.64	1,033.96	1,034.04	1,035.04	1,783.04	
Alliance	Arthur Barr	5.10%	421	421.8	450.8	458.8	580.04	880.36	904.36	921.32	997.32
SDLP	Thomas Doherty	6.49%	536	536.08	547.08	569.08	655.16	679.16	968.16	970.16	970.16
SDLP	Courtrey	9.11%	753	753	754	776	809	866	915	915	916
United Loyalist	Gordon Hegarty	9.28%	767	777.64	778.64	779.72	782.8	786.88	788.96		
SDLP	Millar	5.95%	492	492.08	494.08	505.08	552.08	564.08			
Alliance	Gormley	5.02%	415	415.56	428.56	443.56	499.56				
Republican Clubs	Gillespie	2.59%	214	214.08	214.08	251.08					
Alliance	Morrison	2.12%	175	175.88	183.88	184.88					
Nationalist	Mulhern	1.72%	142	142.08	146.08						
NI Labour	Grace Stevenson	1.07%	88	88.16							
Electorate: 10,497 Valid: 8,262 (78.71%) Spoilt: 94 Quota: 1,181 Turnout: 8,356 (79.60%)

=== Area B ===
1973: 3 x United Loyalist, 1 x SDLP, 1 x Alliance

Londonderry Area B - 5 seats
Party	Candidate	FPv%	Count								
Party	Candidate	FPv%	1	2	3	4	5	6	7	8	9
United Loyalist	Glenn Barr	22.11%	1,659								
Alliance	Herbert Faulkner	11.37%	853	867.4	868.4	869.4	953.64	959.6	1,203.6	1,251.6	
SDLP	Michael Fegan	12.53%	940	940.72	943.72	967.72	969.72	1,009.96	1,047.96	1,726.96	
United Loyalist	Anna Hay	11.66%	875	1,030.04	1,030.04	1,030.04	1,033.04	1,035.28	1,087.52	1,088.52	????
United Loyalist	T. G. Heathley	11.65%	874	1,039.36	1,039.36	1,039.36	1,044.36	1,044.6	1,045.6	1,046.6	????
United Loyalist	Jeffrey	12.80%	960	1,017.12	1,017.12	1,017.12	1,018.6	1,019.6	1,019.6	1,021.6	????
SDLP	Morrison	5.77%	433	433	434	454	458	463	485		
Nationalist	McCloskey	2.11%	158	158	160	211	213	348	360		
Alliance	Kelly	3.43%	257	257.24	258.24	264.24	325.24	530.24			
Nationalist	Boyle	2.21%	166	167.68	168.68	194.68	194.68				
Alliance	Sinclair	2.19%	164	164.96	165.96	166.96					
Republican Clubs	Moran	1.21%	91	91	151						
Republican Clubs	Shotter	0.96%	72	72							
Electorate: 10,377 Valid: 7,502 (72.29%) Spoilt: 104 Quota: 1,251 Turnout: 7,606 (73.30%)

- Data missing from stage 9

=== Area C ===
1973: 3 x SDLP, 1 x Nationalist, 1 x Republican Clubs

Londonderry Area C - 5 seats
Party	Candidate	FPv%	Count								
Party	Candidate	FPv%	1	2	3	4	5	6	7	8	9
Nationalist	Gerard Barr	13.87%	698	703	705	717	729	1,020			
SDLP	Patrick Devine	14.46%	728	728	731	731	804	821	859.4		
SDLP	Hugh Doherty	10.43%	525	528	533	540	603	619	637.4	650.15	865.15
SDLP	Leonard Green	9.60%	483	484	489	490	559	577	592.2	596.28	849.28
Republican Clubs	Michael Montgomery	7.97%	401	467	469	731	738	762	838.8	840.84	840.84
Alliance	Kelly	8.66%	436	436	644	649	656	665	673.8	674.82	703.82
SDLP	Nelis	7.43%	374	378	382	384	520	544	565.6	566.11	
Nationalist	John McCrystal	7.51%	378	381	384	399	410				
SDLP	Joseph Moran	7.35%	370	375	378	382					
Republican Clubs	Liam Gallagher	5.40%	272	310	312						
Alliance	Gerard O'Grady	4.75%	239	241							
Republican Clubs	P. C. Quinn	2.56%	129								
Electorate: 9,324 Valid: 5,033 (53.98%) Spoilt: 206 Quota: 839 Turnout: 5,239 (56.19%)

=== Area D ===
1973: 2 x SDLP, 1 x United Loyalist, 1 x Alliance, 1 x Nationalist

Londonderry Area D - 5 seats
Party	Candidate	FPv%	Count											
Party	Candidate	FPv%	1	2	3	4	5	6	7	8	9	10	11	12
United Loyalist	Marlene Jefferson	23.42%	1,041											
SDLP	Raymond McClean	18.18%	808											
SDLP	Feeney	14.47%	643	644	666.4	666.48	668.64	675.72	689.8	696.88	745.64			
Alliance	Joe Cosgrove	9.18%	408	518	519.68	532.76	534.76	535.76	552	555	567.16	577.24	797.44	797.44
Nationalist	James Hegarty	7.67%	341	344	346	346	346	351	361.08	373.16	375.56	518.8	529.12	607.04
Republican Clubs	Mickey Doherty	5.15%	229	231	231	231	260	281	286.08	381.16	385.16	401.32	402.32	419.92
SDLP	William O'Connoll	4.81%	214	215	235.88	235.96	236.04	239.04	246.12	248.12	318.52	325.4	339.8	
Alliance	Mulhern	3.49%	155	273	274.04	295.2	296.2	297.2	308.28	308.28	310.44	317.68		
Nationalist	Charles McDaid	3.67%	163	165	166.52	166.52	171.68	178.68	187.76	195.84	196.92			
SDLP	O'Hara	2.68%	119	119	131.64	131.64	131.72	133.72	140.96	142.04				
Republican Clubs	Lynch	2.16%	96	97	97.32	97.32	116.32	128.32	133.4					
Independent	O'Neill	1.51%	67	80	80.96	83.96	84.04	92.12						
Ind. Republican	Finbar O'Doherty	1.60%	71	71	71.16	71.16	71.16							
Republican Clubs	McCool	1.33%	59	59	59.56	59.56								
Alliance	McKenna	0.70%	31	39	39.4									
Electorate: 6,982 Valid: 4,445 (63.66%) Spoilt: 122 Quota: 741 Turnout: 4,567 (65.41%)

=== Area E ===
1973: 2 x United Loyalist, 2 x SDLP, 1 x Alliance, 1 x Nationalist

Londonderry Area E - 6 seats
Party	Candidate	FPv%	Count															
Party	Candidate	FPv%	1	2	3	4	5	6	7	8	9	10	11	12	13	14	15	16
United Loyalist	Jack Allen	17.45%	1,519															
Alliance	Ivor Canavan	8.25%	718	719.98	720.98	766.98	791.16	791.16	792.16	804.16	830.16	1,029.32	1,032.32	1,332.04				
United Loyalist	Albert McCartney	10.26%	893	1,100.9	1,100.9	1,102.44	1,102.62	1,103.62	1,103.62	1,105.62	1,105.62	1,111.34	1,111.34	1,149.78	1,193.78	1,195.78	1,715.78	
SDLP	Dan Casey	11.43%	995	995.36	996.36	998.36	1,012.36	1,012.36	1,013.36	1,205.36	1,055.36	1,064.72	1,141.72	1,149.9	1,158.9	1,189.9	1,192.7	1,192.7
Nationalist	Fergus McAteer	6.58%	573	573.36	588.36	589.36	599.36	611.36	618.36	741.36	802.36	808.54	835.54	839.54	847.04	1,089.04	1,091.9	1,091.9
SDLP	Michael Durey	8.08%	703	703	704	712	716	717	721	738	773	781	888	892	898	955	956.86	958.86
SDLP	Craig	8.38%	729	729.9	729.9	731.9	744.9	747.9	753.9	766.9	794.9	806.44	894.44	900.44	906.94	940.94	941.62	943.62
United Loyalist	Walker	5.92%	515	565.04	565.04	565.22	566.22	567.22	568.22	568.22	568.22	568.22	568.4	584.84	597.84	598.02		
Republican Clubs	S. Gallagher	2.54%	221	221.18	222.18	222.18	223.18	320.18	478.36	488.36	523.36	523.36	545.36	546.36	547.36			
Alliance	Edith Roulston	3.45%	300	303.96	303.96	328.14	329.14	329.14	329.14	329.14	342.14	393.5	397.5					
SDLP	A. Gallagher	3.26%	284	284.18	284.18	284.18	286.18	287.18	290.18	296.18	331.18	336.18						
Alliance	Brian Brown	2.83%	246	249.06	249.06	270.06	287.5	288.5	288.68	292.68	304.68							
Independent	Brendan Duddy	2.78%	242	242	243	244	262	264	269	287								
Nationalist	Doherty	2.39%	208	208	209	213	221	222	223									
Republican Clubs	P. Gallagher	1.86%	162	162	163	163	164.18	188.36										
Republican Clubs	Sweeney	1.67%	145	145.18	145.18	145.18	146.18											
Independent	Bergin	1.33%	116	117.98	117.98	117.98												
Alliance	Commander	1.29%	112	112.9	113.9													
Nationalist	Geraldine O'Driscoll	0.26%	23	23														
Electorate: 12,899 Valid: 8,704 (67.48%) Spoilt: 153 Quota: 1,244 Turnout: 8,857 (68.66%)

== Aftermath ==
Even though the United Loyalists won the most votes, the SDLP won the most councillors with ten being elected to the United Loyalists' nine. The nonsectarian Alliance Party of Northern Ireland won four, the Nationalist Party won three and one was won by the Republican Clubs. The result gave parties supported by the city's Catholic community a majority on the council for the first time. The SDLP were disappointed not to win a majority on the council. John Hume blamed this on transfers going to other parties, noting the United Loyalist voters in the Bogside had transferred to the Alliance Party, while Republican Club voters in Londonderry E had transferred to the Nationalist Party.

The new council elected Raymond McClean of the SDLP as Mayor of Londonderry, only the second Catholic mayor in the city's history, while Jack Allen of the United Loyalists was elected as deputy mayor.

Following the election, there had been disputes within the United Loyalists. Some members of the UUP once said to the DUP's Anna Hay, who had been elected to Londonderry B and was the mother of the future Speaker of the Northern Ireland Assembly William Hay, that they had only "lent" her her seat due to the UUP being historically the stronger unionist party at the time.
