= 1977 Londonderry City Council election =

Local govt election in Northern Ireland

← 1973	18 May 1977	1981 →

All 27 seats to Londonderry City Council 14 seats needed for a majority
	First party	Second party	Third party
Party	SDLP	UUP	Nationalist
Seats won	13	6	4
Seat change	▲3	▲6	▲1
	Fourth party	Fifth party	Sixth party
Party	Alliance	DUP	United Loyalist
Seats won	2	2	0
Seat change	▼2	▲2	▼9
	Seventh party
Party	Republican Clubs
Seats won	0
Seat change	▼1

Elections to Londonderry City Council were held on 18 May 1977 on the same day as the other Northern Irish local government elections. The election used five district electoral areas to elect a total of 27 councillors.

== Election results ==
Londonderry City Council Election Result 1977
Party	Seats	Gains	Losses	Net gain/loss	Seats %	Votes %	Votes	+/−
SDLP	13	3	0	▲3	48.1	42.1	12,462	▲9.7
UUP	6	6	0	▲6	22.2	23.5	6,969	New
Nationalist	4	1	0	▲1	14.8	8.9	2,638	▲0.5
Alliance	2	0	2	▼2	7.4	11.9	3,519	▼2.6
DUP	2	2	0	▲2	7.4	6.7	1,986	New
Ind. Nationalist	0	0	0	0	0.0	2.4	706	▲2.4
Republican Clubs	0	0	1	▼1	0.0	1.9	551	▼4.3
Vanguard	0	0	0	0	0.0	1.4	408	New
Loyalist	0	0	0	0	0.0	0.8	273	▲0.8
NI Labour	0	0	0	0	0.0	0.1	44	▼0.2
Ind. Republican	0	0	0	0	0.0	0.2	61	0.0

Note: "Votes" are the first preference votes.

== Districts summary ==
Results of the Londonderry City Council election, 1977 by district
Ward	%	Cllrs	%	Cllrs	%	Cllrs	%	Cllrs	%	Cllrs	%	Cllrs	Total Cllrs
Ward	SDLP		UUP		Nationalist		Alliance		DUP		Others		Total Cllrs
Area A	40.2	3	36.8	2	0.0	0	9.7	0	12.7	1	0.6	0	6
Area B	25.4	1	29.0	2	0.0	0	19.0	1	15.9	1	10.7	0	5
Area C	56.6	3	0.0	0	23.0	2	6.7	0	0.0	0	13.7	0	5
Area D	50.2	3	17.8	1	19.4	1	7.5	0	0.0	0	5.1	0	5
Area E	46.4	3	22.7	1	12.0	1	12.7	1	0.0	0	6.2	0	6
Total	42.1	13	23.5	6	8.9	4	11.9	2	6.7	2	6.9	0	27

== Districts results ==
=== Area A ===
1973: 3 x United Loyalist, 2 x SDLP, 1 x Alliance
1977: 3 x SDLP, 2 x UUP, 1 x DUP
1973-1977 Change: UUP (two seats), DUP and SDLP gain from United Loyalists (three seats) and Alliance

Londonderry Area A - 6 seats
Party	Candidate	FPv%	Count									
Party	Candidate	FPv%	1	2	3	4	5	6	7	8	9	10
SDLP	Thomas Doherty*	10.65%	762	780	781	781	1,124					
UUP	Thomas Craig*	13.21%	945	948	963	1,002	1,004	1,004.29	1,430.29			
UUP	Robert Bond*	10.12%	724	728	739	948	950	950	1,158			
DUP	John Henry	9.70%	694	695	851	858	858	858	912	1,156		
SDLP	John McNickle	12.33%	882	886	886	888	910	979.31	981.31	983.31	983.31	984.31
SDLP	George Peoples*	10.69%	765	771	772	773	825	851.39	852.39	852.39	853.39	854.39
Alliance	Arthur Barr*	7.35%	526	686	688	695	718	720.03	730.03	760.03	807.03	827.03
UUP	Alan Lindsay	8.81%	630	631	642	716	717	717				
SDLP	Patrick Boyle	6.49%	464	472	472	472						
UUP	Vincent Lindsay	4.64%	332	332	347							
DUP	Joseph Mooney	3.02%	216	217								
Alliance	James Patterson	2.38%	170									
NI Labour	Delap Stevenson	0.62%	44									
Electorate: 10,859 Valid: 7,154 (65.88%) Spoilt: 268 Quota: 1,023 Turnout: 7,422 (68.35%)

=== Area B ===
1973: 3 x United Loyalist, 1 x SDLP, 1 x Alliance
1977: 2 x UUP, 1 x DUP, 1 x SDLP, 1 x Alliance
1973-1977 Change: UUP (two seats) and DUP gain from United Loyalist (three seats)

Londonderry Area B - 5 seats
Party	Candidate	FPv%	Count							
Party	Candidate	FPv%	1	2	3	4	5	6	7	8
Alliance	Herbert Faulkner*	17.10%	1,156							
DUP	Anna Hay*	10.18%	688	688	697	702	766	784	1,147	
UUP	James Guy	12.31%	832	838	845	862	890	1,062	1,083	1,346
UUP	Kathleen Milligan	11.48%	776	781	782	812	841	996	1,003	1,161
SDLP	Michael Fegan*	15.09%	1,020	1,024	1,025	1,037	1,037	1,037	1,038	1,040
SDLP	William Doherty	10.27%	694	699	700	718	718	719	722	728
Vanguard	Samuel Barr	6.04%	408	409	412	428	475	486	527	
DUP	Gregory Campbell	5.74%	388	389	393	393	436	447		
UUP	Thomas Robinson	5.19%	351	351	352	360	380			
Loyalist	Thomas Heatley	2.80%	189	190	246	247				
Alliance	Florence Lewers	1.94%	131	148	148					
Loyalist	William Gurney	1.24%	84	84						
NI Labour	David Buchanan	0.62%	42							
Electorate: 10,601 Valid: 6,759 (63.76%) Spoilt: 231 Quota: 1,127 Turnout: 6,990 (65.94%)

=== Area C ===
1973: 3 x SDLP, 1 x Nationalist, 1 x Republican Clubs
1977: 3 x SDLP, 2 x Nationalist
1973-1977 Change: Nationalist gain from Republican Clubs

Londonderry Area C - 5 seats
Party	Candidate	FPv%	Count						
Party	Candidate	FPv%	1	2	3	4	5	6	7
SDLP	Patrick Devine*	22.47%	1,004						
SDLP	Hugh Doherty*	17.50%	782						
SDLP	Leonard Green*	9.67%	432	624.4	644.68	661.58	763.58		
Nationalist	John McChrystal	10.43%	466	471.2	472.2	515.1	533.7	588.96	595.92
Nationalist	Gerard Barr*	10.70%	478	480.6	481.32	530.58	541.88	566.88	578.48
Republican Clubs	Michael Montgomery*	9.36%	418	420.08	420.52	537.12	546.68	561.1	561.1
SDLP	Joseph Moran	6.98%	312	358.8	365.52	370.38	419.22		
Alliance	Gerard O'Grady	6.67%	298	301.9	302.7	322.34			
Republican Clubs	Liam Gallagher	2.98%	133	135.34	135.82				
Nationalist	George O'Connor	1.88%	84	85.04	85.16				
Ind. Republican	Patrick Quinn	1.37%	61	62.04	62.08				
Electorate: 9,318 Valid: 4,468 (47.95%) Spoilt: 312 Quota: 745 Turnout: 4,780 (51.30%)

=== Area D ===
1973: 2 x SDLP, 1 x Nationalist, 1 x Alliance, 1 x United Loyalist
1977: 3 x SDLP, 1 x Nationalist, 1 x UUP
1973-1977 Change: SDLP and UUP gain from Alliance and United Loyalist

Londonderry Area D - 5 seats
Party	Candidate	FPv%	Count						
Party	Candidate	FPv%	1	2	3	4	5	6	7
SDLP	Raymond McClean*	26.15%	927						
UUP	Marlene Jefferson*	17.80%	631						
SDLP	William Keys	16.87%	598						
SDLP	William McCartney	7.14%	253	530.2	530.97	536.06	541.07	594.07	
Nationalist	Liam Bradley	10.55%	374	379.76	379.98	380.08	438.17	459.54	661.54
Alliance	Joe Cosgrove*	7.48%	265	284.44	317.99	318.24	325.08	375.08	385.08
Nationalist	Charles McDaid	4.32%	153	163.08	163.63	163.73	240.09	245.66	
Ind. Nationalist	James Hegarty*	5.22%	185	198.32	200.52	200.77	208.78		
Nationalist	John McQuaide	4.49%	159	162.24	162.46	162.51			
Electorate: 5,973 Valid: 3,545 (59.35%) Spoilt: 174 Quota: 591 Turnout: 3,719 (62.26%)

=== Area E ===
1973: 2 x SDLP, 2 x United Loyalist, 1 x Alliance, 1 x Nationalist
1977: 3 x SDLP, 1 x UUP, 1 x Alliance, 1 x Nationalist
1973-1977 Change: SDLP gain from United Loyalist

Londonderry Area E - 6 seats
Party	Candidate	FPv%	Count						
Party	Candidate	FPv%	1	2	3	4	5	6	7
UUP	Jack Allen*	17.38%	1,337						
SDLP	Frank Donnelly	17.28%	1,329						
Alliance	Ivor Canavan*	10.73%	825	833.64	842.31	980.07	1,036.75	1,296.75	
Nationalist	Fergus McAteer*	9.79%	753	764.62	763.97	884.49	1,078.69	1,087.35	1,094.35
SDLP	William O'Connell	11.38%	875	875.54	917.19	922.36	954.7	962.22	967.22
SDLP	William McCorriston	8.26%	635	635.72	742.48	751.65	838.52	845.82	854.82
SDLP	Noel McKenna	9.47%	728	728.18	775.44	784.61	823.63	828.73	835.73
UUP	Albert McCartney	5.34%	411	628.26	628.94	636.56	638.73		
Ind. Nationalist	Michael Durey*	6.23%	479	479.18	484.96	503.31			
Alliance	Edith Roulston	1.92%	148	152.5	153.01				
Nationalist	Hugh Bell	1.46%	112	114.34	114.85				
Nationalist	Kathleen Heraghty	0.77%	59	59.36	60.04				
Electorate: 13,995 Valid: 7,691 (54.96%) Spoilt: 312 Quota: 1,099 Turnout: 8,003 (57.18%)
