= 1945 United Kingdom general election in Northern Ireland =

- 5 July 1945

All 13 Northern Ireland seats in the House of Commons
- Turnout: 67.4% (▼4.6 pp)
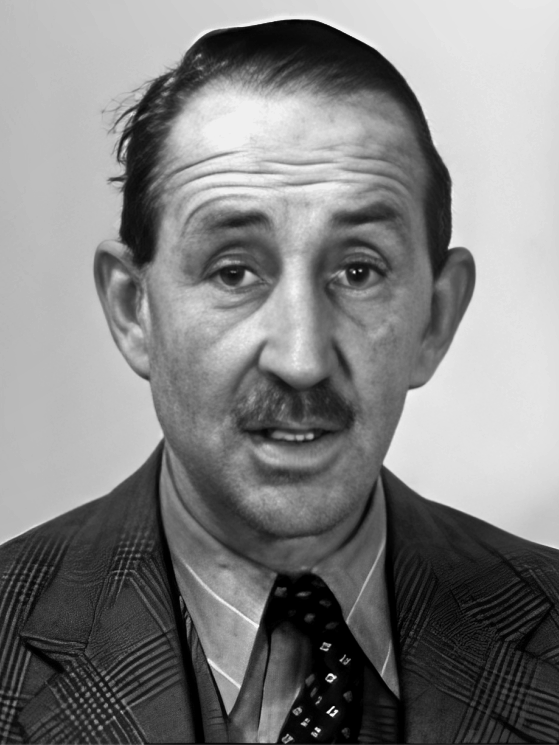
	First party	Second party
		Nat
Leader	Sir Basil Brooke, Bt	James McSparran
Party	UUP	Nationalist
Alliance	Conservative & Churchill Caretaker Ministry
Leader since	1943	1945
Leader's seat	Did not stand	Did not stand
Last election	11 seats, 64.9%	2 seats, 18.3%
Seats won	9 (Note: Includes 1 member elected unopposed.)	2
Seat change	▼2	Steady
Popular vote	392,450 (Note: Voting took place in 12 of 13 seats. The other MP was unopposed.)	148,078
Percentage	53.7%	18.8%
Swing	▼11.2 pp	▲0.5 pp

On 5 July 1945, the 1945 United Kingdom general election was held in Northern Ireland, to elect all 640 members of the House of Commons, including the 13 Northern Ireland seats.

There were ten constituencies, seven single-seat constituencies with elected by first-past-the-post voting and three two-seat constituencies with MPs elected by plurality block voting. This was the final election in which Queen's University of belfast elected a seat to the House of Commons, due to it being abolished for the 1950 general election by the Representation of the People Act 1948.

Held less than two months following VE Day, this was the first general election since 1935, as general elections had been suspended by Parliament during the Second World War. Clement Attlee, the leader of the Labour Party, refused Winston Churchill's offer of continuing the wartime coalition until the Allied defeat of Japan. On 15 June 1945, King George VI dissolved Parliament, which had been sitting for nearly ten years without an election. Counting for the election was not completed until 26 July (three weeks after polling day) to enable those stationed overseas to vote.

As it was the first general election held since the conclusion of the Second World War and nearly 10 years since the 1935 general election, it was the first of three elections during the reign of George VI.

In the election as a whole, the Conservative Party government, which included the Ulster Unionists, lost out to the Labour Party, and Sir Winston Churchill was succeeded as Prime Minister by Clement Attlee.

== Candidates ==
Below is a table summarising the candidates of the 1945 general election in Northern Ireland in the county and borough constituencies, excluding those who stood in Queen's University of Belfast.

Affiliation	Candidates
Ulster Unionist Party	12
Northern Ireland Labour Party	5
Nationalist	3
Independent Unionist	2
Independent Labour	1
Commonwealth Labour Party	1
Total	24

== County and borough constituency results ==
Party	Leader	Candidates	Seats					Aggregate votes		
Party	Leader	Candidates	Total	Gains	Losses	Net	Of total (%)	Total	Of total (%) (Note: Adjusted for multi-member constituencies.)	Change (%)
UUP	Basil; Brooke	12	8	0	2	▼2	69.2	392,450	53.7	▼11.2
Nationalist	James McSparran	3	2	0	0	Steady	15.4	148,078	18.8	▲0.5
Ind. Unionist	—N/a	2	1	Did not stand in 1935		▲1	7.7	68,895	8.9	—N/a
NI Labour	Paddy Agnew	5	0	Did not stand in 1935			—	65,459	11.4	—N/a
Independent Labour	—N/a	1	1	Did not stand in 1935		▲1	7.7	30,787	4.3	—N/a
Commonwealth Labour	Harry Midgley	1	0	New			—	14,096	2.9	New
Total		24	12			0	100.0	719,765	100.0	0.0
Registered voters, and turnout								767,228 (Note: Electorate in contested constituencies. The total electorate was 835,980.)	67.4	▼4.6

=== Popular vote ===
Popular vote
UUP	53.7%
National	18.8%
Other	13.2%
NI Labour	11.4%
CWLP	2.9%

Popular vote (coalitions)
Caretaker Gov.	53.7%
National	18.8%
Other	13.2%
NI Labour	11.4%
CWLP	2.9%

=== Parliamentary seats ===
Parliamentary seats
UUP	69.2%
National	15.4%
Ind. Labour	7.7%
Ind. Unionist	7.7%

Parliamentary seats (coalitions)
Caretaker Gov.	69.2%
National	15.4%
Ind. Labour	7.7%
Ind. Unionist	7.7%

== Queen's University of Belfast constituency result ==
The Ulster Unionists once again won the seat, after having holding it for its entire existence. This was the first election in which a Ulster Unionist Party stood unopposed since 1918. The seat was abolished along with all other University constituencies in the United Kingdom under the reforms for the 1950 United Kingdom general election.

1945 general election: Queen's University of Belfast
Party	Candidate	Votes	%	±%
UUP	Douglas Savory	1,923	72.5	N/A
Independent	Thomas Cusack	728	27.5	New
Majority		1,195	45.0	N/A
Turnout		2,651	51.6	N/A
UUP hold				

== MPs elected ==
Constituency	Party	MP
Antrim	Ulster Unionist	Samuel Haughton
Antrim	Ulster Unionist	Hugh O'Neill
Armagh	Ulster Unionist	William Allen
Belfast East	Ulster Unionist	Thomas Loftus Cole
Belfast North	Ulster Unionist	William Neill
Belfast South	Ulster Unionist	Conolly Gage
Belfast West	Independent Labour	Jack Beattie
Down	Independent Unionist	James Little
Down	Ulster Unionist	Walter Smiles
Fermanagh and Tyrone	Nationalist	Patrick Cunningham
Fermanagh and Tyrone	Nationalist	Anthony Mulvey
Londonderry	Ulster Unionist	Sir Ronald Ross, Bt
Queen's University of Belfast	Ulster Unionist	Douglas Savory

== See also ==
- 1945 United Kingdom general election in England
- 1945 United Kingdom general election in Scotland
- 1945 United Kingdom general election in Wales
