= 1981 Londonderry City Council election =

Local govt election in Northern Ireland

← 1977	20 May 1981	1985 →

All 27 seats to Londonderry City Council 14 seats needed for a majority
	First party	Second party	Third party
Party	SDLP	DUP	UUP
Seats won	14	5	4
Seat change	▲1	▲3	▼2
	Fourth party	Fifth party	Sixth party
Party	Irish Independence	Nationalist	Alliance
Seats won	4	0	0
Seat change	▲4	▼4	▼2

Elections to Londonderry City Council were held on 20 May 1981 on the same day as the other Northern Irish local government elections. The election used five district electoral areas to elect a total of 27 councillors.

== Election results ==
Londonderry City Council Election Result 1981
Party	Seats	Gains	Losses	Net gain/loss	Seats %	Votes %	Votes	+/−
SDLP	14	1	0	▲1	51.9	41.3	13,705	▼0.8
DUP	5	3	0	▲3	18.5	18.6	6,177	▲11.9
UUP	4	0	2	▼2	14.8	15.6	5,168	▼7.9
Irish Independence	4	4	0	▲4	14.8	13.7	4,553	New
Alliance	0	0	2	▼2	0.0	6.4	2,115	▼5.5
Independent Labour	0	0	0	0	0.0	1.3	439	▲1.3
Independent	0	0	0	0	0.0	1.2	396	▲1.2
Irish Republican Socialist	0	0	0	0	0.0	0.7	236	New
Ind. Republican	0	0	0	0	0.0	0.7	235	▲0.7
Republican Clubs	0	0	0	0	0.0	0.4	139	▼1.5
NI Labour	0	0	0	0	0.0	0.1	39	0.0

Note: "Votes" are the first preference votes.

== Districts summary ==
Results of the Londonderry City Council election, 1981 by district
Ward	%	Cllrs	%	Cllrs	%	Cllrs	%	Cllrs	%	Cllrs	Total Cllrs
Ward	SDLP		DUP		UUP		IIP		Others		Total Cllrs
Area A	42.4	3	27.2	2	24.2	1	0.0	0	6.2	0	6
Area B	20.6	1	36.3	2	28.1	2	5.3	0	9.7	0	5
Area C	53.0	3	0.0	0	0.0	0	26.8	2	20.2	0	5
Area D	48.2	3	0.0	0	15.5	1	26.5	1	9.8	0	5
Area E	49.3	4	10.5	1	6.2	0	22.3	1	11.7	0	5
Total	41.3	14	18.6	5	15.6	4	13.7	4	10.8	0	27

== Districts results ==
=== Area A ===
1977: 3 x SDLP, 2 x UUP, 1 x DUP
1981: 3 x SDLP, 2 x DUP, 1 x UUP
1977-1981 Change: DUP gain from UUP

Londonderry Area A - 6 seats
Party	Candidate	FPv%	Count					
Party	Candidate	FPv%	1	2	3	4	5	6
DUP	John Henry*	16.60%	1,412					
UUP	Robert Bond*	11.01%	937	948.34	1,107.62	1,269.62		
SDLP	Thomas Doherty*	9.84%	837	837.14	921.14	921.14	1,371.14	
SDLP	George Peoples*	11.07%	942	942.14	984.14	988.14	1,232.14	
SDLP	John McNickle*	11.97%	1,018	1,018.14	1,041.14	1,041.28	1,148.28	1,299.21
DUP	William Hay	10.65%	906	1,071.76	1,100.9	1,159.96	1,161.96	1,162.74
UUP	Ernest Hamilton	6.96%	592	598.3	635.58	959.74	962.74	964.3
SDLP	Danny Ferguson	9.50%	808	808	844	844		
UUP	Alan Lindsay	6.18%	526	536.78	558.06			
Alliance	John Allen	3.74%	318	318.56				
Alliance	James Patterson	2.03%	173	173.42				
NI Labour	Delap Stevenson	0.46%	39	39.14				
Electorate: 11,803 Valid: 8,508 (72.08%) Spoilt: 278 Quota: 1,216 Turnout: 8,786 (74.44%)

=== Area B ===
1977: 2 x UUP, 1 x DUP, 1 x SDLP, 1 x Alliance
1981: 2 x UUP, 2 x DUP, 1 x SDLP
1977-1981 Change: DUP gain from Alliance

Londonderry Area B - 5 seats
Party	Candidate	FPv%	Count							
Party	Candidate	FPv%	1	2	3	4	5	6	7	8
DUP	Anna Hay*	20.63%	1,586							
DUP	Gregory Campbell	15.69%	1,206	1,207	1,459.7					
SDLP	Michael Fegan*	14.56%	1,119	1,129	1,129.19	1,129.33	1,303.33			
UUP	James Guy*	14.03%	1,078	1,083	1,114.73	1,210.35	1,212.35	1,590.35		
UUP	Robert Ferris	7.59%	583	584	591.6	636.12	636.26	748.63	1,037.47	1,044.47
Alliance	Robert McCullough	9.20%	707	711	714.23	719.97	725.97	746.75	764.18	922.18
SDLP	Colm Elliott	6.01%	462	471	471	471	558	558	558	
UUP	George McNally	6.45%	496	496	500.37	526.55	527.55			
Irish Independence	Thomas McGlinchey	5.33%	410	413	413	413.28				
Independent Labour	Bernard McAnaney	0.51%	39							
Electorate: 10,950 Valid: 7,686 (70.19%) Spoilt: 169 Quota: 1,282 Turnout: 7,855 (71.74%)

=== Area C ===
1977: 3 x SDLP, 2 x Nationalist
1981: 3 x SDLP, 2 x IIP
1977-1981 Change: Nationalists (two seats) join IIP

Londonderry Area C - 5 seats
Party	Candidate	FPv%	Count											
Party	Candidate	FPv%	1	2	3	4	5	6	7	8	9	10	11	12
SDLP	Patrick Devine*	33.72%	1,566											
SDLP	Anna Gallagher	7.60%	353	733.97	733.97	744.48	749.48	768.54	801.54					
Irish Independence	John McChrystal*	12.90%	599	631.13	635.13	642.13	704.13	725.64	730.15	765.15	897.15			
Irish Independence	Gerard Barr*	6.44%	299	312.77	316.28	319.28	343.79	350.79	353.79	400.3	400.3	499.81	583.81	646.34
SDLP	Joseph Moran	4.93%	229	425.86	426.37	430.41	432.41	455.53	484.08	492.59	514.59	536.2	542.2	617.93
SDLP	Raymond Rogan	6.72%	312	399.21	399.21	406.76	408.78	419.31	461.37	469.39	472.39	476.41	478.41	505.47
Independent	Samuel Brown	5.90%	274	291.34	292.34	300.85	300.85	339.38	351.89	368.89	369.89	379.4	383.4	
Irish Independence	Eileen Doherty	4.76%	221	233.24	239.24	243.24	266.26	276.26	278.26	343.28	343.28			
Ind. Republican	Vincent Coyle	3.75%	174	177.57	221.57	223.57	228.57	240.59	242.1					
Alliance	Gerard O'Grady	4.59%	213	219.63	219.63	228.14	228.14	236.67						
Republican Clubs	Eamonn Melaugh	3.08%	143	159.83	159.83	175.34	177.34							
Irish Independence	Patrick Harkin	2.69%	125	128.06	129.06	130.06								
Independent Labour	Ann Donnelly	1.61%	75	81.63	81.63									
Ind. Republican	John Carr	1.31%	61	63.04										
Electorate: 9,071 Valid: 4,644 (51.20%) Spoilt: 247 Quota: 775 Turnout: 4,891 (53.92%)

=== Area D ===
1977: 3 x SDLP, 1 x Nationalist, 1 x UUP
1981: 3 x SDLP, 1 x IIP, 1 x DUP
1977-1981 Change: DUP gain from UUP, Nationalist joins IIP

Londonderry Area D - 5 seats
Party	Candidate	FPv%	Count						
Party	Candidate	FPv%	1	2	3	4	5	6	7
SDLP	William Keys*	24.08%	788						
Irish Independence	Liam Bradley*	18.06%	591						
DUP	Margaret Buchanan	15.49%	507						
SDLP	William McCartney	10.79%	353	521.95	525.52	549.52			
SDLP	John Tierney	13.38%	438	481.4	483.99	496.92	504.68	516.1	564.1
Irish Independence	Roger O'Doherty	5.56%	182	187.89	205.95	218.68	252.94	355.75	364.58
Alliance	Snoo Sinclair	4.31%	141	145.96	146.24	155.07	156.38	160.38	
Irish Independence	Liam Wray	2.84%	93	94.55	104.63	112.84	144.06		
Irish Republican Socialist	Thomas McCourt	2.81%	92	95.72	98.66	104.87			
Independent Labour	Colm Fox	2.69%	88	94.82	96.71				
Electorate: 5,119 Valid: 3,273 (63.94%) Spoilt: 153 Quota: 546 Turnout: 3,426 (66.93%)

=== Area E ===
1977: 3 x SDLP, 1 x UUP, 1 x Alliance, 1 x Nationalist
1981: 4 x SDLP, 1 x UUP, 1 x IIP
1977-1981 Change: SDLP gain from Alliance, Nationalist joins IIP

Londonderry Area E - 6 seats
Party	Candidate	FPv%	Count											
Party	Candidate	FPv%	1	2	3	4	5	6	7	8	9	10	11	12
SDLP	Frank Donnelly*	14.78%	1,344											
Irish Independence	Fergus McAteer*	13.23%	1,203	1,203	1,204.77	1,236.77	1,284.77	1,372.77						
UUP	David Davis	10.51%	956	956	956	956	956	956	957	958	958	1,465		
SDLP	William O'Connell*	12.93%	1,176	1,177	1,182.67	1,199.67	1,202.7	1,212.7	1,234.85	1,245.88	1,247.72	1,247.75	1,247.75	1,307.75
SDLP	Leonard Green*	10.82%	984	989	1,012.88	1,023.88	1,031.88	1,038.91	1,076.39	1,102.48	1,105.24	1,106.24	1,106.89	1,244.69
SDLP	William McCorriston*	10.73%	976	977	982.31	994.34	997.34	998.37	1,020.55	1,030.58	1,031.5	1,035.5	1,035.5	1,094.26
Alliance	Mary Breen	6.19%	563	563	563.99	569.99	570.99	571.99	603.99	622.99	623.91	638.91	802.06	824.74
Irish Independence	James Crossan	3.84%	349	349	349.21	358.24	383.24	455.27	473.27	722.33	788.57	789.57	790.22	
DUP	Annette Hetherington	6.16%	560	560	560.03	560.03	560.03	560.03	562.03	563.03	563.03			
Irish Independence	Edward Bradley	3.31%	301	301	301.3	307.3	323.3	339.3	363.36					
Independent Labour	John Duffy	1.80%	164	215	216.05	223.05	231.05	234.05						
Irish Independence	Denis McIntyre	1.98%	180	182	182.09	189.09	205.09							
Irish Republican Socialist	Paul Whoriskey	1.58%	144	146	146.03	155.03								
Independent	Michael Shiels	1.34%	122	125	125.06									
Independent Labour	William Webster	0.80%	73											
Electorate: 15,885 Valid: 9,095 (57.26%) Spoilt: 282 Quota: 1,300 Turnout: 9,377 (59.03%)
