= Londonderry Area E =

District electoral areas in Londonderry, Northern Ireland

Londonderry Area E, called Derry Area B from 1984, was one of the five district electoral areas in Derry, Northern Ireland which existed from 1973 to 1985. The district elected six members to Londonderry City Council, and formed part of the Londonderry constituencies for the Northern Ireland Assembly and UK Parliament.

It was created for the 1973 local elections, and contained the wards of Culmore, Pennyburn, Rosemount, Shantallow, Springtown and Strand. It was abolished for the 1985 local elections and replaced by the Shantallow DEA.

== Councillors ==
Election	Councillor (Party)	Councillor (Party)	Councillor (Party)	Councillor (Party)	Councillor (Party)	Councillor (Party)
1981	David Davis (UUP)	Frank Donnelly (SDLP)	Leonard Green (SDLP)	William O'Connell (SDLP)	William McCorriston (SDLP)	Fergus McAteer (IIP)/ (Nationalist)
1977	Jack Allen (UUP)/ (United Loyalist)	Frank Donnelly (SDLP)	Ivor Canavan (Alliance)	William O'Connell (SDLP)	William McCorriston (SDLP)	Fergus McAteer (IIP)/ (Nationalist)
1973	Jack Allen (UUP)/ (United Loyalist)	Albert McCartney (United Loyalist)	Ivor Canavan (Alliance)	Dan Casey (SDLP)	Michael Durey (SDLP)	Fergus McAteer (IIP)/ (Nationalist)

== 1981 Election ==
1977: 3 x SDLP, 1 x UUP, 1 x Alliance, 1 x Nationalist

1981: 4 x SDLP, 1 x UUP, 1 x IIP

1977-1981 Change: SDLP gain from Alliance, Nationalist joins IIP

Londonderry Area E - 6 seats
Party	Candidate	FPv%	Count											
Party	Candidate	FPv%	1	2	3	4	5	6	7	8	9	10	11	12
SDLP	Frank Donnelly*	14.78%	1,344											
Irish Independence	Fergus McAteer*	13.23%	1,203	1,203	1,204.77	1,236.77	1,284.77	1,372.77						
UUP	David Davis	10.51%	956	956	956	956	956	956	957	958	958	1,465		
SDLP	William O'Connell*	12.93%	1,176	1,177	1,182.67	1,199.67	1,202.7	1,212.7	1,234.85	1,245.88	1,247.72	1,247.75	1,247.75	1,307.75
SDLP	Leonard Green	10.82%	984	989	1,012.88	1,023.88	1,031.88	1,038.91	1,076.39	1,102.48	1,105.24	1,106.24	1,106.89	1,244.69
SDLP	William McCorriston*	10.73%	976	977	982.31	994.34	997.34	998.37	1,020.55	1,030.58	1,031.5	1,035.5	1,035.5	1,094.26
Alliance	Mary Breen	6.19%	563	563	563.99	569.99	570.99	571.99	603.99	622.99	623.91	638.91	802.06	824.74
Irish Independence	James Crossan	3.84%	349	349	349.21	358.24	383.24	455.27	473.27	722.33	788.57	789.57	790.22	
DUP	Annette Hetherington	6.16%	560	560	560.03	560.03	560.03	560.03	562.03	563.03	563.03			
Irish Independence	Edward Bradley	3.31%	301	301	301.3	307.3	323.3	339.3	363.36					
Independent Labour	John Duffy	1.80%	164	215	216.05	223.05	231.05	234.05						
Irish Independence	Denis McIntyre	1.98%	180	182	182.09	189.09	205.09							
Irish Republican Socialist	Paul Whoriskey	1.58%	144	146	146.03	155.03								
Independent	Michael Shiels	1.34%	122	125	125.06									
Independent Labour	William Webster	0.80%	73											
Electorate: 15,885 Valid: 9,095 (57.26%) Spoilt: 282 Quota: 1,300 Turnout: 9,377 (59.03%)

== 1977 Election ==
1973: 2 x SDLP, 2 x United Loyalist, 1 x Alliance, 1 x Nationalist

1977: 3 x SDLP, 1 x UUP, 1 x Alliance, 1 x Nationalist

1973-1977 Change: SDLP gain from United Loyalist

Londonderry Area E - 6 seats
Party	Candidate	FPv%	Count						
Party	Candidate	FPv%	1	2	3	4	5	6	7
UUP	Jack Allen*	17.38%	1,337						
SDLP	Frank Donnelly	17.28%	1,329						
Alliance	Ivor Canavan*	10.73%	825	833.64	842.31	980.07	1,036.75	1,296.75	
Nationalist	Fergus McAteer*	9.79%	753	764.62	763.97	884.49	1,078.69	1,087.35	1,094.35
SDLP	William O'Connell	11.38%	875	875.54	917.19	922.36	954.7	962.22	967.22
SDLP	William McCorriston	8.26%	635	635.72	742.48	751.65	838.52	845.82	854.82
SDLP	Noel McKenna	9.47%	728	728.18	775.44	784.61	823.63	828.73	835.73
UUP	Albert McCartney*	5.34%	411	628.26	628.94	636.56	638.73		
Ind. Nationalist	Michael Durey*	6.23%	479	479.18	484.96	503.31			
Alliance	Edith Roulston	1.92%	148	152.5	153.01				
Nationalist	Hugh Bell	1.46%	112	114.34	114.85				
Nationalist	Kathleen Heraghty	0.77%	59	59.36	60.04				
Electorate: 13,995 Valid: 7,691 (54.96%) Spoilt: 312 Quota: 1,099 Turnout: 8,003 (57.18%)

=== Area E ===
1973: 2 x United Loyalist, 2 x SDLP, 1 x Alliance, 1 x Nationalist

Londonderry Area E - 6 seats
Party	Candidate	FPv%	Count															
Party	Candidate	FPv%	1	2	3	4	5	6	7	8	9	10	11	12	13	14	15	16
United Loyalist	Jack Allen	17.45%	1,519															
Alliance	Ivor Canavan	8.25%	718	719.98	720.98	766.98	791.16	791.16	792.16	804.16	830.16	1,029.32	1,032.32	1,332.04				
United Loyalist	Albert McCartney	10.26%	893	1,100.9	1,100.9	1,102.44	1,102.62	1,103.62	1,103.62	1,105.62	1,105.62	1,111.34	1,111.34	1,149.78	1,193.78	1,195.78	1,715.78	
SDLP	Dan Casey	11.43%	995	995.36	996.36	998.36	1,012.36	1,012.36	1,013.36	1,205.36	1,055.36	1,064.72	1,141.72	1,149.9	1,158.9	1,189.9	1,192.7	1,192.7
Nationalist	Fergus McAteer	6.58%	573	573.36	588.36	589.36	599.36	611.36	618.36	741.36	802.36	808.54	835.54	839.54	847.04	1,089.04	1,091.9	1,091.9
SDLP	Michael Durey	8.08%	703	703	704	712	716	717	721	738	773	781	888	892	898	955	956.86	958.86
SDLP	Craig	8.38%	729	729.9	729.9	731.9	744.9	747.9	753.9	766.9	794.9	806.44	894.44	900.44	906.94	940.94	941.62	943.62
United Loyalist	Walker	5.92%	515	565.04	565.04	565.22	566.22	567.22	568.22	568.22	568.22	568.22	568.4	584.84	597.84	598.02		
Republican Clubs	S. Gallagher	2.54%	221	221.18	222.18	222.18	223.18	320.18	478.36	488.36	523.36	523.36	545.36	546.36	547.36			
Alliance	Edith Roulston	3.45%	300	303.96	303.96	328.14	329.14	329.14	329.14	329.14	342.14	393.5	397.5					
SDLP	A. Gallagher	3.26%	284	284.18	284.18	284.18	286.18	287.18	290.18	296.18	331.18	336.18						
Alliance	Brian Brown	2.83%	246	249.06	249.06	270.06	287.5	288.5	288.68	292.68	304.68							
Independent	Brendan Duddy	2.78%	242	242	243	244	262	264	269	287								
Nationalist	Doherty	2.39%	208	208	209	213	221	222	223									
Republican Clubs	P. Gallagher	1.86%	162	162	163	163	164.18	188.36										
Republican Clubs	Sweeney	1.67%	145	145.18	145.18	145.18	146.18											
Independent	Bergin	1.33%	116	117.98	117.98	117.98												
Alliance	Commander	1.29%	112	112.9	113.9													
Nationalist	Geraldine O'Driscoll	0.26%	23	23														
Electorate: 12,899 Valid: 8,704 (67.48%) Spoilt: 153 Quota: 1,244 Turnout: 8,857 (68.66%)
