= Londonderry Area D =

District electoral areas in Londonderry, Northern Ireland

Londonderry Area D, called Derry Area D from 1984, was one of the five district electoral areas in Derry, Northern Ireland which existed from 1973 to 1985. The district elected five members to Londonderry City Council, and formed part of the Londonderry constituencies for the Northern Ireland Assembly and UK Parliament.

It was created for the 1973 local elections, and contained the wards of Brandywell, Riverside, St. Columb's Wells, The Diamond and Waterloo. It was abolished for the 1985 local elections and replaced by the Northland DEA.

== Councillors ==
Election	Councillor (Party)	Councillor (Party)	Councillor (Party)	Councillor (Party)	Councillor (Party)
1981	Margaret Buchanan (DUP)	William Keys (SDLP)	William McCartney (SDLP)	John Tierney (SDLP)	Liam Bradley (IIP)/ (Nationalist)
1977	Marlene Jefferson (UUP)/ (United Loyalist)	William Keys (SDLP)	William McCartney (SDLP)	Raymond McClean (SDLP)	Liam Bradley (IIP)/ (Nationalist)
1973	Marlene Jefferson (UUP)/ (United Loyalist)	Joe Cosgrove (Alliance)	Feeney (SDLP)	Raymond McClean (SDLP)	James Hegarty (Nationalist)

== 1981 Election ==
1977: 3 x SDLP, 1 x Nationalist, 1 x UUP

1981: 3 x SDLP, 1 x IIP, 1 x DUP

1977-1981 Change: DUP gain from UUP, Nationalist joins IIP

Londonderry Area D - 5 seats
Party	Candidate	FPv%	Count						
Party	Candidate	FPv%	1	2	3	4	5	6	7
SDLP	William Keys*	24.08%	788						
Irish Independence	Liam Bradley*	18.06%	591						
DUP	Margaret Buchanan	15.49%	507						
SDLP	William McCartney	10.79%	353	521.95	525.52	549.52			
SDLP	John Tierney	13.38%	438	481.4	483.99	496.92	504.68	516.1	564.1
Irish Independence	Roger O'Doherty	5.56%	182	187.89	205.95	218.68	252.94	355.75	364.58
Alliance	Snoo Sinclair	4.31%	141	145.96	146.24	155.07	156.38	160.38	
Irish Independence	Liam Wray	2.84%	93	94.55	104.63	112.84	144.06		
Irish Republican Socialist	Thomas McCourt	2.81%	92	95.72	98.66	104.87			
Independent Labour	Colm Fox	2.69%	88	94.82	96.71				
Electorate: 5,119 Valid: 3,273 (63.94%) Spoilt: 153 Quota: 546 Turnout: 3,426 (66.93%)

== 1977 Election ==
1973: 2 x SDLP, 1 x Nationalist, 1 x Alliance, 1 x United Loyalist

1977: 3 x SDLP, 1 x Nationalist, 1 x UUP

1973-1977 Change: SDLP and UUP gain from Alliance and United Loyalist

Londonderry Area D - 5 seats
Party	Candidate	FPv%	Count						
Party	Candidate	FPv%	1	2	3	4	5	6	7
SDLP	Raymond McClean*	26.15%	927						
UUP	Marlene Jefferson*	17.80%	631						
SDLP	William Keys	16.87%	598						
SDLP	William McCartney	7.14%	253	530.2	530.97	536.06	541.07	594.07	
Nationalist	Liam Bradley	10.55%	374	379.76	379.98	380.08	438.17	459.54	661.54
Alliance	Joe Cosgrove*	7.48%	265	284.44	317.99	318.24	325.08	375.08	385.08
Nationalist	Charles McDaid	4.32%	153	163.08	163.63	163.73	240.09	245.66	
Ind. Nationalist	James Hegarty*	5.22%	185	198.32	200.52	200.77	208.78		
Nationalist	John McQuaide	4.49%	159	162.24	162.46	162.51			
Electorate: 5,973 Valid: 3,545 (59.35%) Spoilt: 174 Quota: 591 Turnout: 3,719 (62.26%)

== 1973 Election ==
1973: 2 x SDLP, 1 x United Loyalist, 1 x Alliance, 1 x Nationalist

Londonderry Area D - 5 seats
Party	Candidate	FPv%	Count											
Party	Candidate	FPv%	1	2	3	4	5	6	7	8	9	10	11	12
United Loyalist	Marlene Jefferson	23.42%	1,041											
SDLP	Raymond McClean	18.18%	808											
SDLP	Feeney	14.47%	643	644	666.4	666.48	668.64	675.72	689.8	696.88	745.64			
Alliance	Joe Cosgrove	9.18%	408	518	519.68	532.76	534.76	535.76	552	555	567.16	577.24	797.44	797.44
Nationalist	James Hegarty	7.67%	341	344	346	346	346	351	361.08	373.16	375.56	518.8	529.12	607.04
Republican Clubs	Mickey Doherty	5.15%	229	231	231	231	260	281	286.08	381.16	385.16	401.32	402.32	419.92
SDLP	William O'Connoll	4.81%	214	215	235.88	235.96	236.04	239.04	246.12	248.12	318.52	325.4	339.8	
Alliance	Mulhern	3.49%	155	273	274.04	295.2	296.2	297.2	308.28	308.28	310.44	317.68		
Nationalist	Charles McDaid	3.67%	163	165	166.52	166.52	171.68	178.68	187.76	195.84	196.92			
SDLP	O'Hara	2.68%	119	119	131.64	131.64	131.72	133.72	140.96	142.04				
Republican Clubs	Lynch	2.16%	96	97	97.32	97.32	116.32	128.32	133.4					
Independent	O'Neill	1.51%	67	80	80.96	83.96	84.04	92.12						
Ind. Republican	Finbar O'Doherty	1.60%	71	71	71.16	71.16	71.16							
Republican Clubs	McCool	1.33%	59	59	59.56	59.56								
Alliance	McKenna	0.70%	31	39	39.4									
Electorate: 6,982 Valid: 4,445 (63.66%) Spoilt: 122 Quota: 741 Turnout: 4,567 (65.41%)
