= Londonderry Area B =

District electoral areas in Londonderry, Northern Ireland

Londonderry Area B, called Derry Area B from 1984, was one of the five district electoral areas in Derry, Northern Ireland which existed from 1973 to 1985. The district elected five members to Londonderry City Council, and formed part of the Londonderry constituencies for the Northern Ireland Assembly and UK Parliament.

It was created for the 1973 local elections, and contained the wards of Altnagelvin, Caw, Clondermot, Ebrington and Victoria. It was abolished for the 1985 local elections and replaced by the Waterside DEA.

== Councillors ==
Election	Councillor (Party)	Councillor (Party)	Councillor (Party)	Councillor (Party)	Councillor (Party)
1981	Gregory Campbell (DUP)	Anna Henry (DUP)/ (United Loyalist)	James Guy (UUP)	Robert Ferris (UUP)	Michael Fegan (SDLP)
1977	Herbert Faulkner (Alliance)	Anna Henry (DUP)/ (United Loyalist)	James Guy (UUP)	Kathleen Milligan (UUP)	Michael Fegan (SDLP)
1973	Herbert Faulkner (Alliance)	Anna Henry (DUP)/ (United Loyalist)	Glenn Barr (United Loyalist)	T. G. Heathley (United Loyalist)	Michael Fegan (SDLP)

== 1981 Election ==
1977: 2 x UUP, 1 x DUP, 1 x SDLP, 1 x Alliance

1981: 2 x UUP, 2 x DUP, 1 x SDLP

1977-1981 Change: DUP gain from Alliance

Londonderry Area B - 5 seats
Party	Candidate	FPv%	Count							
Party	Candidate	FPv%	1	2	3	4	5	6	7	8
DUP	Anna Hay*	20.63%	1,586							
DUP	Gregory Campbell	15.69%	1,206	1,207	1,459.7					
SDLP	Michael Fegan*	14.56%	1,119	1,129	1,129.19	1,129.33	1,303.33			
UUP	James Guy*	14.03%	1,078	1,083	1,114.73	1,210.35	1,212.35	1,590.35		
UUP	Robert Ferris	7.59%	583	584	591.6	636.12	636.26	748.63	1,037.47	1,044.47
Alliance	Robert McCullough	9.20%	707	711	714.23	719.97	725.97	746.75	764.18	922.18
SDLP	Colm Elliott	6.01%	462	471	471	471	558	558	558	
UUP	George McNally	6.45%	496	496	500.37	526.55	527.55			
Irish Independence	Thomas McGlinchey	5.33%	410	413	413	413.28				
Independent Labour	Bernard McAnaney	0.51%	39							
Electorate: 10,950 Valid: 7,686 (70.19%) Spoilt: 169 Quota: 1,282 Turnout: 7,855 (71.74%)

== 1977 Election ==
1973: 3 x United Loyalist, 1 x SDLP, 1 x Alliance

1977: 2 x UUP, 1 x DUP, 1 x SDLP, 1 x Alliance

1973-1977 Change: UUP (two seats) and DUP gain from United Loyalist (three seats)

Londonderry Area B - 5 seats
Party	Candidate	FPv%	Count							
Party	Candidate	FPv%	1	2	3	4	5	6	7	8
Alliance	Herbert Faulkner*	17.10%	1,156							
DUP	Anna Hay*	10.18%	688	688	697	702	766	784	1,147	
UUP	James Guy	12.31%	832	838	845	862	890	1,062	1,083	1,346
UUP	Kathleen Milligan	11.48%	776	781	782	812	841	996	1,003	1,161
SDLP	Michael Fegan*	15.09%	1,020	1,024	1,025	1,037	1,037	1,037	1,038	1,040
SDLP	William Doherty	10.27%	694	699	700	718	718	719	722	728
Vanguard	Samuel Barr	6.04%	408	409	412	428	475	486	527	
DUP	Gregory Campbell	5.74%	388	389	393	393	436	447		
UUP	Thomas Robinson	5.19%	351	351	352	360	380			
Loyalist	Thomas Heatley	2.80%	189	190	246	247				
Alliance	Florence Lewers	1.94%	131	148	148					
Loyalist	William Gurney	1.24%	84	84						
NI Labour	David Buchanan	0.62%	42							
Electorate: 10,601 Valid: 6,759 (63.76%) Spoilt: 231 Quota: 1,127 Turnout: 6,990 (65.94%)

== 1973 Election ==
1973: 3 x United Loyalist, 1 x SDLP, 1 x Alliance

Londonderry Area B - 5 seats
Party	Candidate	FPv%	Count								
Party	Candidate	FPv%	1	2	3	4	5	6	7	8	9
United Loyalist	Glenn Barr	22.11%	1,659								
Alliance	Herbert Faulkner	11.37%	853	867.4	868.4	869.4	953.64	959.6	1,203.6	1,251.6	
SDLP	Michael Fegan	12.53%	940	940.72	943.72	967.72	969.72	1,009.96	1,047.96	1,726.96	
United Loyalist	Anna Hay	11.66%	875	1,030.04	1,030.04	1,030.04	1,033.04	1,035.28	1,087.52	1,088.52	????
United Loyalist	T. G. Heathley	11.65%	874	1,039.36	1,039.36	1,039.36	1,044.36	1,044.6	1,045.6	1,046.6	????
United Loyalist	Jeffrey	12.80%	960	1,017.12	1,017.12	1,017.12	1,018.6	1,019.6	1,019.6	1,021.6	????
SDLP	Morrison	5.77%	433	433	434	454	458	463	485		
Nationalist	McCloskey	2.11%	158	158	160	211	213	348	360		
Alliance	Kelly	3.43%	257	257.24	258.24	264.24	325.24	530.24			
Nationalist	Boyle	2.21%	166	167.68	168.68	194.68	194.68				
Alliance	Sinclair	2.19%	164	164.96	165.96	166.96					
Republican Clubs	Moran	1.21%	91	91	151						
Republican Clubs	Shotter	0.96%	72	72							
Electorate: 10,377 Valid: 7,502 (72.29%) Spoilt: 104 Quota: 1,251 Turnout: 7,606 (73.30%)

- Data missing from stage 9
