= Londonderry Area A =

District electoral areas in Londonderry, Northern Ireland

Londonderry Area A, called Derry Area A from 1984, was one of the five district electoral areas in Derry, Northern Ireland which existed from 1973 to 1985. The district elected six members to Londonderry City Council, and formed part of the Londonderry constituencies for the Northern Ireland Assembly and UK Parliament.

It was created for the 1973 local elections, and contained the wards of Banagher, Claudy, Eglinton, Enagh, Faughan and Prehen. It was abolished for the 1985 local elections and replaced by the Rural DEA.

== Councillors ==
Election	Councillor (Party)	Councillor (Party)	Councillor (Party)	Councillor (Party)	Councillor (Party)	Councillor (Party)
1981	John Henry (DUP)	William Hay (DUP)	Robert Bond (UUP)/ (United Loyalist)	John McNickle (SDLP)	Thomas Doherty (SDLP)	George Peoples (SDLP)
1977	John Henry (DUP)	Thomas Craig (UUP)/ (United Loyalist)	Robert Bond (UUP)/ (United Loyalist)	John McNickle (SDLP)	Thomas Doherty (SDLP)	George Peoples (SDLP)
1973	Robinson (United Loyalist)	Thomas Craig (UUP)/ (United Loyalist)	Robert Bond (UUP)/ (United Loyalist)	Arthur Barr (Alliance)	Thomas Doherty (SDLP)	George Peoples (SDLP)

== 1981 Election ==
1977: 3 x SDLP, 2 x UUP, 1 x DUP

1981: 3 x SDLP, 2 x DUP, 1 x UUP

1977-1981 Change: DUP gain from UUP

Londonderry Area A - 6 seats
Party	Candidate	FPv%	Count					
Party	Candidate	FPv%	1	2	3	4	5	6
DUP	John Henry*	16.60%	1,412					
UUP	Robert Bond*	11.01%	937	948.34	1,107.62	1,269.62		
SDLP	Thomas Doherty*	9.84%	837	837.14	921.14	921.14	1,371.14	
SDLP	George Peoples*	11.07%	942	942.14	984.14	988.14	1,232.14	
SDLP	John McNickle*	11.97%	1,018	1,018.14	1,041.14	1,041.28	1,148.28	1,299.21
DUP	William Hay	10.65%	906	1,071.76	1,100.9	1,159.96	1,161.96	1,162.74
UUP	Ernest Hamilton	6.96%	592	598.3	635.58	959.74	962.74	964.3
SDLP	Danny Ferguson	9.50%	808	808	844	844		
UUP	Alan Lindsay	6.18%	526	536.78	558.06			
Alliance	John Allen	3.74%	318	318.56				
Alliance	James Patterson	2.03%	173	173.42				
NI Labour	Delap Stevenson	0.46%	39	39.14				
Electorate: 11,803 Valid: 8,508 (72.08%) Spoilt: 278 Quota: 1,216 Turnout: 8,786 (74.44%)

== 1977 Election ==
1973: 3 x United Loyalist, 2 x SDLP, 1 x Alliance

1977: 3 x SDLP, 2 x UUP, 1 x DUP

1973-1977 Change: UUP (two seats), DUP and SDLP gain from United Loyalists (three seats) and Alliance

Londonderry Area A - 6 seats
Party	Candidate	FPv%	Count									
Party	Candidate	FPv%	1	2	3	4	5	6	7	8	9	10
SDLP	Thomas Doherty*	10.65%	762	780	781	781	1,124					
UUP	Thomas Craig*	13.21%	945	948	963	1,002	1,004	1,004.29	1,430.29			
UUP	Robert Bond*	10.12%	724	728	739	948	950	950	1,158			
DUP	John Henry	9.70%	694	695	851	858	858	858	912	1,156		
SDLP	John McNickle	12.33%	882	886	886	888	910	979.31	981.31	983.31	983.31	984.31
SDLP	George Peoples*	10.69%	765	771	772	773	825	851.39	852.39	852.39	853.39	854.39
Alliance	Arthur Barr*	7.35%	526	686	688	695	718	720.03	730.03	760.03	807.03	827.03
UUP	Alan Lindsay	8.81%	630	631	642	716	717	717				
SDLP	Patrick Boyle	6.49%	464	472	472	472						
UUP	Vincent Lindsay	4.64%	332	332	347							
DUP	Joseph Mooney	3.02%	216	217								
Alliance	James Patterson	2.38%	170									
NI Labour	Delap Stevenson	0.62%	44									
Electorate: 10,859 Valid: 7,154 (65.88%) Spoilt: 268 Quota: 1,023 Turnout: 7,422 (68.35%)

== 1973 Election ==
1973: 3 x United Loyalist, 2 x SDLP, 1 x Alliance

Londonderry Area A - 6 seats
Party	Candidate	FPv%	Count								
Party	Candidate	FPv%	1	2	3	4	5	6	7	8	9
United Loyalist	Thomas Craig	15.66%	1,294								
United Loyalist	Robert Bond	13.63%	1,126	1,160.56	1,163.72	1,163.72	1,172.96	1,189.96			
SDLP	George Peoples	10.64%	879	879.08	884.08	912.08	965.08	1,018.08	1,192.08		
United Loyalist	Robinson	11.62%	960	1,014.64	1,020.64	1,020.64	1,033.96	1,034.04	1,035.04	1,783.04	
Alliance	Arthur Barr	5.10%	421	421.8	450.8	458.8	580.04	880.36	904.36	921.32	997.32
SDLP	Thomas Doherty	6.49%	536	536.08	547.08	569.08	655.16	679.16	968.16	970.16	970.16
SDLP	Courtrey	9.11%	753	753	754	776	809	866	915	915	916
United Loyalist	Gordon Hegarty	9.28%	767	777.64	778.64	779.72	782.8	786.88	788.96		
SDLP	Millar	5.95%	492	492.08	494.08	505.08	552.08	564.08			
Alliance	Gormley	5.02%	415	415.56	428.56	443.56	499.56				
Republican Clubs	Gillespie	2.59%	214	214.08	214.08	251.08					
Alliance	Morrison	2.12%	175	175.88	183.88	184.88					
Nationalist	Mulhern	1.72%	142	142.08	146.08						
NI Labour	Grace Stevenson	1.07%	88	88.16							
Electorate: 10,497 Valid: 8,262 (78.71%) Spoilt: 94 Quota: 1,181 Turnout: 8,356 (79.60%)
