= Ivan Cooper =

Northern Irish politician (1944–2019)

Ivan Averill Cooper (5 January 1944 – 26 June 2019) was a civil rights activist and Irish nationalist politician from Northern Ireland. He was a member of the Parliament of Northern Ireland and a founding member of the Social Democratic and Labour Party (SDLP). He is often known for leading the civil rights march on 30 January 1972 that developed into the Bloody Sunday massacre.

== Early years ==
Cooper was born in Claudy, County Londonderry, into a working-class Protestant family who were members of the Church of Ireland. He was brought up in nearby Killaloo, before he and his family moved in 1956 to the Bogside area of Derry city. He was briefly a member of the Claudy Young Unionist Association until April 1965 when he joined the Northern Ireland Labour Party. As the Labour candidate in the Stormont general election that year, he attracted a moderate amount of cross-community support but was not elected.

He was the husband of Frances and had two daughters, Sinead and Bronagh.

== Civil rights campaign ==
Committed to non-violence, Cooper became a major figure in the Northern Ireland Civil Rights Association, which campaigned for equality during the late 1960s. In 1968, he resigned from the Labour Party and founded the Derry Citizens' Action Committee (DCAC), serving as its president until the following year. In the summer of 1968, at a protest meeting in the Guildhall foyer, he suggested that Catholics and Protestants alike should fight for their rights "as the blacks in America were fighting".

Cooper was one of the organisers of a DCAC march in Derry on 16 November 1968, attended by from 15,000–20,000 people in defiance of a month-long ban imposed on marches in the city. Following violence resulting from marches in the city, Cooper called for a halt to spontaneous marches. After escalation of street disturbances at the start of the year, following a march by the People's Democracy movement, which resulted in residents of the Bogside cordoning off areas with impromptu barricades, Cooper managed to persuade locals to remove the barricades. The damage seemed irreparable, however, after a march in Newry got out of control. Most Protestants and many Catholics who had remained supportive of the civil rights actions now withdrew their support.

== Parliament ==
In the 1969 general election, Cooper was elected as an independent member of the Parliament of Northern Ireland for Mid Londonderry, defeating the sitting Nationalist Party MP, Paddy Gormley.

On 12 August – the start of the few intense days of violence which have become known as the Battle of the Bogside – Cooper tried to restrain Catholics protesting an Apprentice Boys of Derry parade by linking arms with John Hume and Eddie McAteer. However, they were swept aside and Cooper was knocked unconscious by a brick.

Cooper was suspended from Stormont for a week on 20 March after a protest in the Chamber over a Public Order Bill.

== SDLP ==
On 21 August 1970, Cooper co-founded the Social Democratic and Labour Party (SDLP) with Hume, Paddy Devlin, Austin Currie, Paddy O’Hanlon and Gerry Fitt.

Cooper organised a civil rights and anti-internment march for 30 January 1972, which was to develop into Bloody Sunday, in which fourteen unarmed civilians were murdered by soldiers from the Parachute Regiment on duty in Derry, who opened fire on the crowd.

After the abolition of the Stormont Parliament, Cooper was elected as one of the representatives of Mid Ulster to the Northern Ireland Assembly, 1973 and the Northern Ireland Constitutional Convention in 1975. He was also the SDLP's candidate in the constituency in both the February 1974 and October 1974 Westminster elections.

In 1983, Cooper stood aside after the boundary changes for the new Foyle constituency to let his colleague and friend John Hume contest the seat. The increase in levels of violence intertwined with the politics made Cooper slowly move away from politics. He was later an insolvency consultant.

== Legacy ==
Attempting to rise above sectarian politics, he remained hopeful that both Catholics and Protestants could work together, particularly the working classes of both groups, who he believed shared the same greater interests. His nationalist stance, however, led many fellow Protestants to view him as a traitor. Cooper nonetheless remained a practising member of the Church of Ireland.

A film released in 2002, called Bloody Sunday, saw Cooper portrayed by actor James Nesbitt.

Parliament of Northern Ireland
Preceded by Patrick Gormley	Member of Parliament for Mid Londonderry; 1969–1973	Parliament abolished
Northern Ireland Assembly (1973)
New assembly	Assembly Member for Mid-Ulster; 1973–1974	Assembly abolished
Northern Ireland Constitutional Convention
New convention	Member for Mid-Ulster; 1975–1976	Convention dissolved
