= Londonderry Area C =

District electoral areas in Londonderry, Northern Ireland

Londonderry Area C, called Derry Area C from 1984, was one of the five district electoral areas in Derry, Northern Ireland which existed from 1973 to 1985. The district elected five members to Londonderry City Council, and formed part of the Londonderry constituencies for the Northern Ireland Assembly and UK Parliament.

It was created for the 1973 local elections, and contained the wards of Beechwood, Creggan Central, Creggan South, Crevagh and Westland. It was abolished for the 1985 local elections and replaced by the Cityside DEA.

== Councillors ==
Election	Councillor (Party)	Councillor (Party)	Councillor (Party)	Councillor (Party)	Councillor (Party)
1981	Patrick Devine (SDLP)	Anna Gallagher (SDLP)	Joseph Moran (SDLP)	Gerard Barr (IIP)/ (Nationalist)	John McChrystal (IIP)/ (Nationalist)
1977	Patrick Devine (SDLP)	Hugh Doherty (SDLP)	Leonard Green (SDLP)	Gerard Barr (IIP)/ (Nationalist)	John McChrystal (IIP)/ (Nationalist)
1973	Patrick Devine (SDLP)	Hugh Doherty (SDLP)	Leonard Green (SDLP)	Gerard Barr (IIP)/ (Nationalist)	Michael Montgomery (Republican Clubs)

== 1981 Election ==
1977: 3 x SDLP, 2 x Nationalist

1981: 3 x SDLP, 2 x IIP

1977-1981 Change: Nationalists (two seats) join IIP

Londonderry Area C - 5 seats
Party	Candidate	FPv%	Count											
Party	Candidate	FPv%	1	2	3	4	5	6	7	8	9	10	11	12
SDLP	Patrick Devine*	33.72%	1,566											
SDLP	Anna Gallagher	7.60%	353	733.97	733.97	744.48	749.48	768.54	801.54					
Irish Independence	John McChrystal*	12.90%	599	631.13	635.13	642.13	704.13	725.64	730.15	765.15	897.15			
Irish Independence	Gerard Barr*	6.44%	299	312.77	316.28	319.28	343.79	350.79	353.79	400.3	400.3	499.81	583.81	646.34
SDLP	Joseph Moran	4.93%	229	425.86	426.37	430.41	432.41	455.53	484.08	492.59	514.59	536.2	542.2	617.93
SDLP	Raymond Rogan	6.72%	312	399.21	399.21	406.76	408.78	419.31	461.37	469.39	472.39	476.41	478.41	505.47
Independent	Samuel Brown	5.90%	274	291.34	292.34	300.85	300.85	339.38	351.89	368.89	369.89	379.4	383.4	
Irish Independence	Eileen Doherty	4.76%	221	233.24	239.24	243.24	266.26	276.26	278.26	343.28	343.28			
Ind. Republican	Vincent Coyle	3.75%	174	177.57	221.57	223.57	228.57	240.59	242.1					
Alliance	Gerard O'Grady	4.59%	213	219.63	219.63	228.14	228.14	236.67						
Republican Clubs	Eamonn Melaugh	3.08%	143	159.83	159.83	175.34	177.34							
Irish Independence	Patrick Harkin	2.69%	125	128.06	129.06	130.06								
Independent Labour	Ann Donnelly	1.61%	75	81.63	81.63									
Ind. Republican	John Carr	1.31%	61	63.04										
Electorate: 9,071 Valid: 4,644 (51.20%) Spoilt: 247 Quota: 775 Turnout: 4,891 (53.92%)

== 1977 Election ==
1973: 3 x SDLP, 1 x Nationalist, 1 x Republican Clubs

1977: 3 x SDLP, 2 x Nationalist

1973-1977 Change: Nationalist gain from Republican Clubs

Londonderry Area C - 5 seats
Party	Candidate	FPv%	Count						
Party	Candidate	FPv%	1	2	3	4	5	6	7
SDLP	Patrick Devine*	22.47%	1,004						
SDLP	Hugh Doherty*	17.50%	782						
SDLP	Leonard Green*	9.67%	432	624.4	644.68	661.58	763.58		
Nationalist	John McChrystal	10.43%	466	471.2	472.2	515.1	533.7	588.96	595.92
Nationalist	Gerard Barr*	10.70%	478	480.6	481.32	530.58	541.88	566.88	578.48
Republican Clubs	Michael Montgomery*	9.36%	418	420.08	420.52	537.12	546.68	561.1	561.1
SDLP	Joseph Moran	6.98%	312	358.8	365.52	370.38	419.22		
Alliance	Gerard O'Grady	6.67%	298	301.9	302.7	322.34			
Republican Clubs	Liam Gallagher	2.98%	133	135.34	135.82				
Nationalist	George O'Connor	1.88%	84	85.04	85.16				
Ind. Republican	Patrick Quinn	1.37%	61	62.04	62.08				
Electorate: 9,318 Valid: 4,468 (47.95%) Spoilt: 312 Quota: 745 Turnout: 4,780 (51.30%)

== 1973 Election ==
1973: 3 x SDLP, 1 x Nationalist, 1 x Republican Clubs

Londonderry Area C - 5 seats
Party	Candidate	FPv%	Count								
Party	Candidate	FPv%	1	2	3	4	5	6	7	8	9
Nationalist	Gerard Barr	13.87%	698	703	705	717	729	1,020			
SDLP	Patrick Devine	14.46%	728	728	731	731	804	821	859.4		
SDLP	Hugh Doherty	10.43%	525	528	533	540	603	619	637.4	650.15	865.15
SDLP	Leonard Green	9.60%	483	484	489	490	559	577	592.2	596.28	849.28
Republican Clubs	Michael Montgomery	7.97%	401	467	469	731	738	762	838.8	840.84	840.84
Alliance	Kelly	8.66%	436	436	644	649	656	665	673.8	674.82	703.82
SDLP	Nelis	7.43%	374	378	382	384	520	544	565.6	566.11	
Nationalist	John McCrystal	7.51%	378	381	384	399	410				
SDLP	Joseph Moran	7.35%	370	375	378	382					
Republican Clubs	Liam Gallagher	5.40%	272	310	312						
Alliance	Gerard O'Grady	4.75%	239	241							
Republican Clubs	P. C. Quinn	2.56%	129								
Electorate: 9,324 Valid: 5,033 (53.98%) Spoilt: 206 Quota: 839 Turnout: 5,239 (56.19%)
