= James O'Reilly (Irish politician) =

James O'Reilly, also known as Seamas O'Reilly, (1916–1992) was a nationalist politician in Ireland.

O'Reilly was a farmer and an activist in the Nationalist Party and was elected to Kilkeel Rural District Council. He stood unsuccessfully for the Irish Anti-Partition League in the 1948 Armagh by-election.

O'Reilly was elected in the 1958 Northern Ireland general election, representing Mourne, holding the seat until the abolition of the Parliament of Northern Ireland in 1972. He became prominent in the 1960s, when he tried to have Orange Order parades through Kilkeel rerouted.

From February to April 1966 and February 1967 to February 1969, he was the deputy chair of Ways and Means and Deputy Speaker of the Northern Ireland House of Commons. After the 1969 Northern Ireland general election, he served as the whip of the Opposition Alliance, before succeeding Roderick O'Connor as Nationalist Party whip. He was invited to join the Social Democratic and Labour Party on its formation, but chose to remain a Nationalist Party member.

O'Reilly stood unsuccessfully in South Down at the 1973 Northern Ireland Assembly election.

Parliament of Northern Ireland
Preceded by James McSparran	Member of Parliament for Mourne; 1958–1973	Parliament abolished
Political offices
Preceded by Billy Boyd	Deputy Chairman of Ways and Means and Deputy Speaker of the Northern Ireland House of Commons; 1966	Succeeded by Paddy Gormley
Preceded by Paddy Gormley	Deputy Chairman of Ways and Means and Deputy Speaker of the Northern Ireland House of Commons; 1967–1969	Succeeded by Vivian Simpson
