= Speaker of the House of Commons of Northern Ireland =

The Speaker of the Northern Ireland House of Commons was the presiding officer of the lower house of Parliament in Northern Ireland from 1921 to 1972.

The Speaker had an official residence, Stormont House. All the Speakers were members of the Ulster Unionist Party (UUP) on their election.

There was initially one Deputy Speaker, also invariably an Ulster Unionist, who was also the Chairman of Ways and Means. In 1958 a second Deputy Speaker was appointed, and given the title Deputy Chairman of Ways and Means. From 1963 onwards, this post was often given to members of the Nationalist Party or Northern Ireland Labour Party (NILP).

== Speakers ==
	Name	Entered office	Left office	Party
1.	Sir Hugh O'Neill, 1st Baronet	1921	1929	Ulster Unionist Party
2.	Sir Henry Mulholland, 1st Baronet	1929	1945	Ulster Unionist Party
3.	Sir Norman Stronge, 8th Baronet	1945	1956	Ulster Unionist Party
4.	W. F. McCoy	1956	1956	Ulster Unionist Party
3.	Sir Norman Stronge, 8th Baronet	1956	1969	Ulster Unionist Party
5.	Ivan Neill	1969	1972	Ulster Unionist Party

== Chairman of Ways and Means and Deputy Speaker ==
Chairman of Ways and Means and Deputy Speaker		Deputy Chairman of Ways and Means and Deputy Speaker	
Name	Party	Name	Party
Thomas Moles 1921-1937	Ulster Unionist Party	Office not yet created	
John Clarke Davison 1937	Ulster Unionist Party	Office not yet created	
Sir Robert Lynn 1937-1945	Ulster Unionist Party	Office not yet created	
Howard Stevenson 1945	Ulster Unionist Party	Office not yet created	
Thomas Bailie 1945-1948	Ulster Unionist Party	Office not yet created	
R. N. Wilson 1948-1950	Ulster Unionist Party	Office not yet created	
Samuel Hall-Thompson 1950-1953	Ulster Unionist Party	Office not yet created	
Terence O'Neill 1953-1955	Ulster Unionist Party	Office not yet created	
Thomas Lyons 1955-1969	Ulster Unionist Party		
Thomas Lyons 1955-1969	Ulster Unionist Party	Joseph Morgan 1958-1962	Ulster Unionist Party
Thomas Lyons 1955-1969	Ulster Unionist Party	Brian McConnell 1962-1953	Ulster Unionist Party
Thomas Lyons 1955-1969	Ulster Unionist Party	Billy Boyd 1963-1965	Northern Ireland Labour Party
Thomas Lyons 1955-1969	Ulster Unionist Party	James O'Reilly1966	Nationalist Party
Thomas Lyons 1955-1969	Ulster Unionist Party	Paddy Gormley 1966-1967	Nationalist Party
Thomas Lyons 1955-1969	Ulster Unionist Party	James O'Reilly 1967-1969	Nationalist Party
Walter Scott 1969-1972	Ulster Unionist Party	Vivian Simpson 1969-1972	Northern Ireland Labour Party
