= Mid Londonderry =

Mid Londonderry may refer to:

- The central part of County Londonderry
- Mid Londonderry (Northern Ireland Parliament constituency)
