= Paddy Maxwell =

Paddy Maxwell (12 March 1909 – 15 December 1991) was a solicitor and a nationalist politician in Ireland.

Maxwell studied at the Convent of Mercy School, the Christian Brothers' School and St Columb's College. In 1934, he was elected to the City Council for the Nationalist Party, holding his seat until 1946, and became Chairman of the Derry Catholic Registration Association. He entered employment with the Council, but resigned in 1937 in protest at a proposal to gerrymander the wards.

Maxwell founded the Irish Union Association in 1936. In 1937, he was elected to the Northern Ireland House of Commons representing Foyle, but pledged not to take his seat.

This enabled him to become the leader of the Nationalist group on the council in 1938.

A nationalist convention before the 1945 Northern Ireland general election, reselected Maxwell but mandated him to take his seat in Parliament. He did so for a few months, then attended only occasionally for the next few years. Eddie McAteer objected to Maxwell's abstentionism and challenged him at the nationalist convention held before the 1953 general election. McAteer was selected, and Maxwell stood instead as an independent. He was defeated and left politics.

Maxwell was president of the Londonderry Rotary Club in 1958/9, and chairman of the movement in Ireland in 1963/4. He served as vice president, then president, of the Law Society of Northern Ireland from 1966–68. He was a member of the council of the International Bar Association in 1968, then served as a resident magistrate until 1980.

Parliament of Northern Ireland
| Preceded by J. J. McCarroll | Member of Parliament for Foyle; 1937–1953 | Succeeded by Eddie McAteer |
