= Foyle (Northern Ireland Parliament constituency) =

Coordinates: 55.052°N 7.245°W

- Former Borough constituency for the Parliament of Northern Ireland
- Foyle shown within Northern Ireland

Former constituency
- Created: 1929
- Abolished: 1973
- Election method: First past the post

Foyle was a single member constituency in the Parliament of Northern Ireland. It was created in 1929 as one of the five single-member constituencies replacing the former five-member Londonderry constituency. The constituency continued in existence until the Parliament was temporarily suspended in 1972, and then formally abolished in 1973.

The seat was held continuously by nationalist candidates and never even contested by unionists, although labour movement candidates sometimes polled well.

== Members of Parliament ==
- 1929 – 1937: James Joseph McCarroll, Nationalist Party
- 1937 – 1953: Patrick Maxwell, Nationalist Party
- 1953 – 1969: Eddie McAteer, Nationalist Party
- 1969 – 1972: John Hume, Independent Nationalist (1969–70); Social Democratic and Labour Party (1970–72)

== Election results ==
At the 1929 Northern Ireland general election, James Joseph McCarroll was elected unopposed.

General Election 1933: Foyle
Party	Candidate	Votes	%	±%
Nationalist	James Joseph McCarroll	6,557	68.4	N/A
Ind. Republican	Seán McCool	3,031	31.6	New
Majority		3,526	36.8	N/A
Turnout		9.588	64.9	N/A
Nationalist hold		Swing	N/A	

At the 1937 Foyle by-election and the 1938 Northern Ireland general election, Patrick Maxwell was elected unopposed.

General Election 1945: Foyle
Party	Candidate	Votes	%	±%
Nationalist	Patrick Maxwell	6,270	56.0	N/A
Independent Labour	Paddy Fox	4,920	44.0	New
Majority		1,350	12.0	N/A
Turnout		11,190	69.6	N/A
Nationalist hold		Swing	N/A	

At the 1949 Northern Ireland general election, Patrick Maxwell was elected unopposed.

General Election 1953: Foyle
Party	Candidate	Votes	%	±%
Nationalist	Eddie McAteer	6,305	58.8	New
Ind. Nationalist	Patrick Maxwell	4,412	41.2	N/A
Majority		1,893	17.6	N/A
Turnout		10,717	61.7	N/A
Nationalist hold		Swing	N/A	

General Election 1958: Foyle
Party	Candidate	Votes	%	±%
Nationalist	Eddie McAteer	6,953	57.0	−1.8
Independent Labour	Stephen McGonagle	5,238	43.0	New
Majority		1,893	14.0	−3.6
Turnout		12,191	61.7	0.0
Nationalist hold		Swing		

General Election 1962: Foyle
Party	Candidate	Votes	%	±%
Nationalist	Eddie McAteer	8,720	61.4	+4.4
Independent Labour	Stephen McGonagle	5,476	38.6	−4.4
Majority		3,244	22.8	+8.8
Turnout		14,196	75.7	+14.0
Nationalist hold		Swing		

General Election 1965: Foyle
Party	Candidate	Votes	%	±%
Nationalist	Eddie McAteer	7,825	64.2	+2.8
Independent Labour	Seamus Quinn	4,371	35.8	−2.8
Majority		3,454	28.4	+5.6
Turnout		12,196	62.2	−13.5
Nationalist hold		Swing		

General Election 1969: Foyle
Party	Candidate	Votes	%	±%
Ind. Nationalist	John Hume	8,920	55.1	New
Nationalist	Eddie McAteer	5,267	32.6	−31.6
NI Labour	Eamonn McCann	1,993	12.3	New
Majority		3,653	22.5	N/A
Turnout		16,180	81.4	+19.8
Ind. Nationalist gain from Nationalist		Swing		
