= Mid Londonderry (Northern Ireland Parliament constituency) =

Coordinates: 54.889°N 6.968°W

- Former County constituency for the Parliament of Northern Ireland
- Mid Londonderry shown within Northern Ireland

Former constituency
- Created: 1929
- Abolished: 1973
- Election method: First past the post

Mid Londonderry was a county constituency comprising the central part of County Londonderry. It was created in 1929, when the House of Commons (Method of Voting and Redistribution of Seats) Act (Northern Ireland) 1929 introduced first-past-the-post elections throughout Northern Ireland. It was one of five single-member constituencies replacing the former five-member Londonderry constituency. The constituency survived unchanged, returning one member of Parliament until the Parliament of Northern Ireland was temporarily suspended in 1972, and then formally abolished in 1973.

The constituency was primarily rural and included areas between Coleraine, Limavady, Derry and Magherafelt.

The seat was held until 1969 by Nationalist Party candidates, and was rarely contested.

== Members of Parliament ==
- 1929 – 1939: George Leeke, Nationalist Party
- 1939 – 1945: vacant
- 1945 – 1953: Eddie McAteer, Nationalist Party
- 1953 – 1969: Paddy Gormley, Nationalist Party
- 1969 – 1972: Ivan Cooper, Independent Nationalist (1969–1970); Social Democratic and Labour Party (1970–1972)

== Election results ==
At the 1929, 1933 and 1938 Northern Ireland general elections, George Leeke was elected unopposed.

At the 1945 and 1949 Northern Ireland general elections, Eddie McAteer was elected unopposed.

General Election 1953: Mid Londonderry
Party	Candidate	Votes	%	±%
Nationalist	Paddy Gormley	4,134	53.8	N/A
Anti-Partition	T. B. Agnew	3,550	46.2	New
Majority		584	7.6	N/A
Turnout		7,684	48.6	N/A
Nationalist hold		Swing	N/A	

At the 1958, 1962 and 1965 Northern Ireland general elections, Paddy Gormley was elected unopposed.

General Election 1969: Mid Londonderry
Party	Candidate	Votes	%	±%
Ind. Nationalist	Ivan Cooper	6,056	45.1	New
UUP	R. W. Shields	4,438	33.0	New
Nationalist	Paddy Gormley	2,229	16.6	N/A
Republican Labour	J. O'Kane	709	5.3	New
Majority		1,618	12.1	N/A
Turnout		13,432	81.8	N/A
Ind. Nationalist gain from Nationalist		Swing	N/A	
