= Vivian Simpson (politician) =

Frederick Vivian Simpson (23 August 1903 – 1977) was a politician in Northern Ireland.

Born in Dublin, Simpson worked as a draper and footwear manufacturer, and also became a lay preacher.

Simpson joined the Northern Ireland Labour Party (NILP) and stood unsuccessfully for Stormont in Larne both in a 1945 by-election, and in the general election later that year. In 1947, he was elected to Carrickfergus District Council. In the 1953 general election he switched to contest Carrick, but was again unsuccessful. He was finally elected to Stormont in Belfast Oldpark in 1958. He then stood down from his council seat, and retained his Parliamentary seat at each subsequent election.

In March 1969, Simpson became the Deputy Chairman of Ways and Means and Deputy Speaker of the Northern Ireland House of Commons, holding this post until the prorogation of the Parliament in 1972. After his party colleague Paddy Devlin defected to the Social Democratic and Labour Party, he became the sole remaining NILP MP, and the only non-Unionist MP attending Parliament. He became regarded as the party leader; for example, the NILP's manifesto for the Belfast City Council elections of 1973 carried a foreword written by him.

At the 1973 Northern Ireland Assembly election, Simpson stood in Belfast North, but fell well short of taking a seat.

Parliament of Northern Ireland
Preceded by William James Morgan	Member of Parliament for Belfast Oldpark; 1958–1973	Parliament abolished
Political offices
Preceded by James O'Reilly	Deputy Chairman of Ways and Means and Deputy Speaker of the Northern Ireland House of Commons; 1969–1972	Position prorogued 1972; Parliament abolished 1973
Preceded by Tom Boyd	Leader of the Northern Ireland Labour Party at Stormont; 1969–1972	Position prorogued 1972; Parliament abolished 1973
