= 1931 Fermanagh and Tyrone by-election =

UK Parliamentary by-election

The 1931 Fermanagh and Tyrone by-election was held on 7 March 1931. It was held due to the death of the incumbent Nationalist MP Thomas Harbison. Harbison had first been elected to parliament in 1918 as the member for East Tyrone. He had been returned unopposed for this two-member constituency, along with fellow Nationalist Joseph Devlin, at the previous general election. The by-election was won unopposed by the Nationalist (NI) candidate Cahir Healy. Healy had previously been one of the representatives for the constituency from 1922 until 1924.

At the general election a few months later both Healy and Devlin were re-elected.
