= Paddy Gormley =

Patrick Joseph Gormley (1916 – August 2001) was an Irish nationalist politician.

Born in Claudy, Gormley was educated at St Columb's College and then St. Patrick's College, Maynooth (NUI). In 1945, he was elected to the Londonderry County Council, representing the Nationalist Party. His brother Tom, soon followed him into politics.

At the 1953 election to the Parliament of Northern Ireland, Gormley was elected to represent Mid Londonderry. In the three subsequent elections, he was elected unopposed. However, his increasing distance from the majority of the Nationalist Party lost him the chance to become Chairman of the Parliamentary Party in 1964, Eddie McAteer instead taking charge.

Just before the 1965 election, Gormley was seriously injured in a car accident in Carrickmacross. Although he was elected, he remained in hospital until January the following year and eventually won an action against the driver of a lorry involved in the crash.

Despite his injuries, Gormley stood for Londonderry at the 1966 UK general election. He took second place, with 37% of the votes cast. In May 1966, he became Deputy Chairman of Ways and Means and Deputy Speaker of the House of Commons, standing down in February 1967.

In 1966, Gormley spoke warmly of Prime Minister of Northern Ireland Terence O'Neill's overtures to nationalists. He began questioning the party line on issues such as interdenominational schooling, and called for the Nationalist Party to become a centre left radical party.

His criticism of more radical nationalists at the start of The Troubles and his limited support for some of Stormont's actions lost him his seat at the 1969 election.

Parliament of Northern Ireland
Preceded by Eddie McAteer	Member of Parliament for Mid Londonderry; 1953–1969	Succeeded by Ivan Cooper
Political offices
Preceded by James O'Reilly	Deputy Chairman of Ways and Means and Deputy Speaker of the Northern Ireland House of Commons; 1966–1967	Succeeded by James O'Reilly
