= 1934 Fermanagh and Tyrone by-election =

UK Parliamentary by-election

The 1934 Fermanagh and Tyrone by-election was held on 27 June 1934. The by-election was held due to the death of the incumbent Nationalist (NI) MP, Joseph Devlin. It was won by the Nationalist (NI) candidate Joe Stewart.

Fermanagh and Tyrone by-election, 1934
Party	Candidate	Votes	%	±%
Nationalist	Joe Stewart	28,790	61.4	N/A
Ind. Nationalist	Dominick McCrossan	18,809	38.6	New
Majority		10,701	22.8	+20.3
Turnout		47,599		
Nationalist hold		Swing		
