= Fermanagh and Tyrone (UK Parliament constituency) =

Parliamentary constituency in the United Kingdom, 1922–1950

Coordinates: 54.618°N 7.116°W

- Former county constituency for the House of Commons
- Districts of Northern Ireland: County Fermanagh; County Tyrone

1922–1950
- Seats: 2
- Created from: North Fermanagh; South Fermanagh; North East Tyrone; North West Tyrone; South Tyrone
- Replaced by: Fermanagh and South Tyrone; Mid Ulster

Fermanagh and Tyrone was a parliamentary constituency in Northern Ireland which was represented in the House of Commons of the Parliament of the United Kingdom. It elected two Members of Parliament (MPs) using the bloc vote system.

== History and boundaries ==
The Government of Ireland Act 1920 established the Parliament of Northern Ireland, which came into operation in 1921. The representation of Northern Ireland at Westminster was reduced from 30 MPs to 13 MPs, taking effect at the 1922 general election. The two-seat county constituency of Fermanagh and Tyrone comprising County Fermanagh and County Tyrone replaced the constituencies of North Fermanagh, Fermanagh South, North East Tyrone, North West Tyrone and South Tyrone. An eight-seat constituency of Fermanagh and Tyrone was also created for the House of Commons of Northern Ireland.

Under the Representation of the People Act 1948, all two-member constituencies were divided. Fermanagh and Tyrone was succeeded by Fermanagh and South Tyrone, with the remainder becoming part of Mid Ulster.

== Members of Parliament ==
It was the only constituency in Northern Ireland to regularly elect Nationalist MPs. Nationalist MPs were elected in every general election and by-election held in the constituency, except for the 1924 general election, when no Nationalist stood and two Ulster Unionists defeated two Sinn Féin candidates.

Election	MP	Party	MP	Party
1922	Thomas Harbison	Nationalist	Cahir Healy	Nationalist
1923	Thomas Harbison	Nationalist	Cahir Healy	Nationalist
1924	James Pringle	UUP	Charles Falls	UUP
1929	Thomas Harbison	Nationalist	Joseph Devlin	Nationalist
1931 (b)	Cahir Healy	Nationalist	Joseph Devlin	Nationalist
1931	Cahir Healy	Nationalist	Joseph Devlin	Nationalist
1934 (b)	Cahir Healy	Nationalist	Joe Stewart	Nationalist
1935	Patrick Cunningham	Nationalist	Anthony Mulvey	Nationalist
1945	Patrick Cunningham	Nationalist	Anthony Mulvey	Nationalist
1950	Constituency abolished; see Fermanagh and South Tyrone and Mid Ulster			

== Elections ==
1922 general election: Fermanagh and Tyrone (2 seats)
Party	Candidate	Votes	%	±%
Nationalist	Thomas Harbison	45,236	27.0	
Nationalist	Cahir Healy	44,817	26.8	
UUP	James Pringle	38,640	23.1	
UUP	William Allen	38,589	23.1	
Majority		6,177	3.7	
Turnout		167,282		
Nationalist win (new seat)				
Nationalist win (new seat)				

1923 general election: Fermanagh and Tyrone (2 seats)
Party	Candidate	Votes	%	±%
Nationalist	Thomas Harbison	44,003	27.0	0.0
Nationalist	Cahir Healy	43,668	26.8	0.0
UUP	James Pringle	37,733	23.1	0.0
UUP	Charles Falls	37,682	23.1	0.0
Majority		5,935	3.7	0.0
Turnout		163,086		
Nationalist hold		Swing		
Nationalist hold		Swing		

1924 general election: Fermanagh and Tyrone (2 seats)
Party	Candidate	Votes	%	±%
UUP	Charles Falls	44,716	43.5	+20.4
UUP	James Pringle	44,711	43.4	+20.3
Sinn Féin	Michael McCartan	6,812	6.6	New
Sinn Féin	Thomas Corrigan	6,685	6.5	New
Majority		37,899	36.8	N/A
Majority		38,031	37.0	N/A
Turnout		102,924		
UUP gain from Nationalist		Swing		
UUP gain from Nationalist		Swing		

1929 general election: Fermanagh and Tyrone (2 seats)
Party	Candidate	Votes	%	±%
Nationalist	Joseph Devlin	Unopposed	N/A	N/A
Nationalist	Thomas Harbison	Unopposed	N/A	N/A
Nationalist gain from UUP				
Nationalist gain from UUP				

1931 Fermanagh and Tyrone by-election (1 seat)
Party	Candidate	Votes	%	±%
Nationalist	Cahir Healy	Unopposed	N/A	N/A
Nationalist hold				

1931 general election: Fermanagh and Tyrone (2 seats)
Party	Candidate	Votes	%	±%
Nationalist	Joseph Devlin	50,650	26.5	N/A
Nationalist	Cahir Healy	50,603	26.1	N/A
UUP	Hugh Irwin	45,101	23.6	New
UUP	Ynyr Burges	44,921	23.5	New
Majority		5,502	2.5	N/A
Turnout		191,275		
Nationalist hold		Swing		
Nationalist hold		Swing		

1934 Fermanagh and Tyrone by-election (1 seat)
Party	Candidate	Votes	%	±%
Nationalist	Joe Stewart	28,790	61.4	N/A
Ind. Nationalist	Dominick McCrossan	18,809	38.6	New
Majority		10,701	22.8	+20.3
Turnout		47,599		
Nationalist hold		Swing		

1935 general election: Fermanagh and Tyrone (2 seats)
Party	Candidate	Votes	%	±%
Nationalist	Patrick Cunningham	50,891	26.2	―0.3
Nationalist	Anthony Mulvey	50,603	26.1	N/A
UUP	Roland Deane	46,625	24.0	+0.4
UUP	John Blakiston-Houston	46,000	23.7	+0.2
Majority		3,078	2.1	−0.4
Turnout		194,119		
Nationalist hold		Swing		
Nationalist hold		Swing		

1945 general election: Fermanagh and Tyrone (2 seats)
Party	Candidate	Votes	%	±%
Nationalist	Patrick Cunningham	55,373	27.3	+1.1
Nationalist	Anthony Mulvey	55,144	27.1	+1.0
UUP	Thomas Lyons	46,392	22.8	―1.2
UUP	Noreen Cooper	46,260	22.8	―0.9
Majority		8,752	4.3	+2.2
Turnout		203,169		
Nationalist hold		Swing		
Nationalist hold		Swing		

== Sources ==
- Leigh Rayment's Historical List of MPs – Constituencies beginning with "F"
- Craig, F. W. S. British Parliamentary Election Results 1918–1949.
- ElectionsIreland.org
