= James McSparran =

Irish barrister and nationalist politician (1892-1970)

- Born: 1 May 1892; Glasgow
- Died: 15 April 1970 (aged 77)
- Education: St Mungo's Academy, Glasgow; St Malachy's College in Belfast; National University of Ireland

James McSparran QC (1 May 1892 – 15 April 1970), was an Irish barrister and nationalist politician.

McSparran was born in Glasgow to an Irish family He studied at St Mungo's Academy, Glasgow, then St Malachy's College in Belfast, Queen's University of Belfast, and the National University of Ireland.

McSparran was called to the Irish Bar in 1916, and later became a King's Counsel. He also had interests in the Irish News.

== Political career ==
At the 1945 Northern Ireland general election, McSparran was elected for the Nationalist Party in Mourne: during his own campaign McSparran emphasised the need for northern nationalists to unite to help themselves, as well as promoting their aim to end partition.

He immediately became the Chairman of the Nationalist Party at Stormont, and was the founding Chairman of the Anti-Partition of Ireland League. In 1953, he became instead the President of the League, and in 1958, he stood down from Parliament and his position as Chairman of the Nationalist Party in order to concentrate on his legal career.

McSparran remained active as a barrister and supported the Northern Ireland Civil Rights Association.

An avid Glasgow Celtic fan, he died in Hampden Park as he watched the European Cup semi-final between Glasgow Celtic and Leeds United.

== Family life ==
McSparran had, through his Antrim roots, deep connections with many prominent Catholic families with clerical links and business interests. His brothers included Canon John McSparran, a senior priest of the Diocese of Down and Connor and Dr. Daniel McSparran, Chairman of The Irish News newspaper and Chair of Belfast Celtic.

His son, James D. McSparran KC also practised at the Northern Ireland Bar.

Parliament of Northern Ireland
Preceded by George Panter	Member of Parliament for Mourne; 1945–1958	Succeeded by James O'Reilly
Party political offices
Preceded by Thomas Joseph Campbell	Leader of the Nationalist Party at Stormont; 1945–1958	Succeeded by Joe Stewart
New political party	Chairman of the Irish Anti-Partition League; 1945–1953	Succeeded by Eddie McAteer
