= Eddie McAteer =

Northern Irish politician (1914–1986)

McAteer speaking to RTÉ in 1968

Edward Gerard McAteer (25 June 1914 – 25 March 1986) was an Irish nationalist politician from Northern Ireland. He was born in Coatbridge, Scotland, to Hugh McAteer and Brigid McAteer (née O'Doherty). McAteer's family moved to Derry in Northern Ireland while he was young. In 1930 he joined the Inland Revenue, where he worked until 1944. He then became an accountant and more actively involved in politics. While his brother, Hugh, became a prominent Irish republican in the Irish Republican Army (IRA) and Sinn Féin, Eddie chose constitutional nationalist politics. He was elected as the Nationalist Party Member of Parliament for Mid Londonderry in the 1945 Northern Ireland general election. He was co-founder of the Irish Anti-Partition League, founded in 1946, and became its vice chairman in 1947, then its chairman in 1953.

In 1952, McAteer was elected to Londonderry Corporation, and the following year he switched to represent Foyle in the Northern Ireland House of Commons. He left the city council in 1958 and became deputy leader of the Nationalist Party at Stormont. McAteer became prominent in the campaign calling for the establishment of a university in Derry.

In 1964, he became the leader of the Nationalist Party. The following year he accepted the post of Leader of the Opposition thereby conferring de facto recognition of the Northern Irish government (by Nationalists) for the first time. In the mid-1960s McAteer supported an Anglo-Irish Free Trade Agreement, calling it a "geographic necessity" and urged cooperation between the Southern and Northern Irish governments. Apparently referring to the newly formed European Economic Community (EEC), he asked that the two governments step "bravely together into the New Europe or be dragged ingloriously in like a pair of spancelled goats." Several years later he lost his seat in the 1969 Northern Ireland general election to John Hume. In his early career, he had published Irish Action, a blueprint for civil disobedience; however, he repeatedly called for moderation throughout the civil rights campaign.

In the 1970 United Kingdom general election, McAteer stood in Londonderry on the Unity slate, taking 36.6% of the vote. He again contested Londonderry in the Northern Ireland Assembly, 1973 election, taking 3,712 votes and narrowly missing being elected. With the ascendancy of the Social Democratic and Labour Party, the Nationalist Party was in disarray. McAteer took his remaining supporters into the Irish Independence Party in 1978, in which his son Fergus became prominent.

== Sources ==
- Northern Ireland Parliamentary Elections Results: Biographies, election.demon.co.uk; accessed 27 May 2017.

Parliament of Northern Ireland
| Vacant no official opposition | Leader of the Official Opposition; 1965–1969 | Vacant no official opposition |
| Preceded by George Leeke | Member of Parliament for Mid Londonderry; 1945–1953 | Succeeded by Patrick Gormley |
| Preceded by Paddy Maxwell | Member of Parliament for Foyle; 1953–1969 | Succeeded by John Hume |
Party political offices
| Preceded by James McSparran | Chairman of the Irish Anti-Partition League; 1953–1956 | Vacant League moribund. Formally dissolved 1958 |
| Preceded by Joe Stewart | Leader of the Nationalist Party at Stormont; 1964–1969 | Succeeded by Roderick O'Connor |
