= Joe Stewart (politician) =

Northern Ireland politician (1889–1964)

Joseph Francis Stewart (1889 – 6 May 1964) was an Irish nationalist politician.

After growing up in Dungannon, where he studied at the Christian Brothers' School, Stewart worked as a wine merchant and became active in the Irish Parliamentary Party. At the January 1910 general election he worked as the election agent for Tom Kettle.

In 1923 Stewart was elected to the Dungannon Board of Governors, a post he held until the Board was dissolved in 1948. He was also elected to Tyrone County Council for the Nationalist Party, was a long-time member of Dungannon Urban District Council, and was the President of the Tyrone Ancient Order of Hibernians.

At the 1929 general election Stewart was elected to Stormont for the seat of East Tyrone, which he held until his death in 1964.

Following the death of Joseph Devlin, Stewart was elected to Westminster at the 1934 Fermanagh and Tyrone by-election, but he stood down at the following year's general election.

At a conference in 1958 Stewart spoke of the plight of northern Nationalists saying that "they could not succeed in a society where two thirds of the population were against them." In 1958 Stewart became the Chairman of the Nationalist Party at Stormont, a position he retained until his death.

Parliament of Northern Ireland
New constituency	Member of Parliament for East Tyrone; 1929–1964	Succeeded by Austin Currie
Parliament of the United Kingdom
Preceded by Joseph Devlin	Member of Parliament for Fermanagh and Tyrone; 1934–1935; With: Cahir Healy	Succeeded by Patrick Cunningham; Anthony Mulvey
Party political offices
Preceded by James McSparran	Leader of the Nationalist Party at Stormont; 1958–1964	Succeeded by Eddie McAteer
