= Jack Allen (Northern Ireland politician) =

Northern Irish politician

Member of the Northern Ireland Assembly for Londonderry
- In office 20 October 1982 – 1986

Mayor of Derry
- In office 1974–1975

Member of Derry City Council
- In office 30 May 1973 – 20 May 1981
- Preceded by: District created
- Succeeded by: David Davis
- Constituency: Londonderry Area E

Personal details
- Born: 1941; Derry, Northern Ireland
- Political party: Ulster Unionist

Jack Allen is a former Northern Irish unionist politician and businessman from Derry.

== Political career ==
Working as a businessman, Allen became a member of the Ulster Unionist Party (UUP). He was elected to Londonderry City Council. In 1974–75, he served as Mayor of Derry.

Allen was elected to the Northern Ireland Assembly, 1982, representing Londonderry. The following year, he became the Honorary Treasurer of the UUP. In June 1984, Allen was appointed to the prominent role of Chairman of the Devolution Report Committee within the Assembly.

In this position, he wrote three times to the leader of the Social Democratic and Labour Party John Hume, proposing discussions, but was rebuffed. In 1984, amid a dispute about the name of the city council, Allen was defeated in a by-election for a ward on the city council.

Allen headed the UUP list in Foyle for the Northern Ireland Forum election of 1996, but failed to be elected. At the 1998 Northern Ireland Assembly election, he was again unsuccessful in Foyle, despite coming fourth on first preference votes in the six seat constituency. During this period, he was the chairman of the Foyle Ulster Unionist constituency association.

Allen stood down as UUP treasurer in 2005, citing ill health.

Northern Ireland Assembly (1982)
New assembly	MPA for Londonderry; 1982–1986	Assembly abolished
Civic offices
Preceded by Raymond McClean	Mayor of Londonderry; 1974–1975	Succeeded by Ivor Canavan
Party political offices
Preceded by ?	Honorary Treasurer of the Ulster Unionist Party; 1983–2005	Succeeded by Lord Maginnis
