= Anthony Mulvey =

Irish nationalist politician (1882-1957)

Anthony Mulvey (1882 – 11 January 1957) was an Irish nationalist politician.

Born in County Leitrim, Mulvey edited the Ulster Herald newspaper before his election to represent Fermanagh and Tyrone for the Nationalist Party in the British House of Commons at the 1935 general election.

Mulvey did not take his seat until 1945, and with Patrick Cunningham, proposed that the Nationalist Party also take an abstentionist policy with regard to the Parliament of Northern Ireland.

Mulvey held his seat at the 1945 general election, and in 1950 after the division of Fermanagh and Tyrone constituency, he was elected for Mid Ulster, one of the successor constituencies. He stood down the following year, and died aged 74 in 1957.

== Bibliography ==
- Michael Stenton and Stephen Lees, Who's Who of British MPs: Volume IV, 1945-1979 (Harvester, Brighton, 1979) ISBN 0-85527-335-6

Parliament of the United Kingdom
Preceded by Cahir Healy; Joe Stewart	Member of Parliament for Fermanagh and Tyrone; 1935 – 1950; With: Patrick Cunningham	Constituency abolished
New constituency	Member of Parliament for Mid Ulster; 1950 – 1951	Succeeded by Michael O'Neill
