= Patrick Cunningham (politician) =

Patrick Cunningham (1878 – 2 February 1960) was an Irish nationalist politician.

Cunningham, father to thirteen children (one dying as a child), was elected to the Westminster House of Commons for the Nationalist Party as Member of Parliament (MP) for Fermanagh and Tyrone at the 1935 general election.

Cunningham did not take his seat until 1945, and with Anthony Mulvey proposed that the Nationalist Party also take an abstentionist policy with regard to the Parliament of Northern Ireland.

Cunningham held his seat at the 1945 general election, but when the constituency was abolished at the 1950 election he chose not to stand in another seat. He never made a speech in Parliament.

Parliament of the United Kingdom
| Preceded by Cahir Healy; Joe Stewart | Member of Parliament for Fermanagh and Tyrone; 1935 – 1950; With: Anthony Mulvey | Constituency abolished |
