= Ivor Canavan =

Irish politician from Derry

Heber Arthur (Ivor) Canavan, OBE (1929–1999) was a politician in Northern Ireland during the Troubles.

On leaving St Columb's College, Canavan studied Engineering at University College Dublin. He returned to his native Derry in 1959 and commenced a lifelong career with Du Pont. In the context of a deepening political crisis, Canavan became an active member of the Alliance Party of Northern Ireland shortly after its inception in 1970.

Canavan was elected to Londonderry City Council in 1973. In December that year, he took part in the negotiations that culminated in the Sunningdale Agreement. Canavan was elected Deputy Mayor of Londonderry in 1974 and, the following year, became the first and only Alliance Mayor of Londonderry.

In May 1976, the Canavan family home was bombed by the Provisional IRA. No one was in the house at the time of the blast.

Canavan served as Chairman of the Police Authority (NI) Complaints Committee. from 1977-79. He resigned from this post and retired from active politics to take up a position with DuPont in Geneva, Switzerland.

Heber Arthur Canavan was appointed an OBE in 1980 for public services in Northern Ireland. Canavan's brother Michael was a founder member of the Social Democratic and Labour Party (SDLP).

Civic offices
Preceded by Jack Allen	Mayor of Londonderry; 1975–1976	Succeeded by James Hegarty
