= Raymond McClean =

Northern Irish politician

John Raymond McClean
- Born: 16 January 1933; Coleraine, Northern Ireland
- Died: 29 January 2011 (aged 78); Derry, Northern Ireland
- Education: St Columb's College; Royal College of Surgeons in Ireland
- Occupations: Military physician, General practitioner
- Spouse: Sheila McClean
- Children: 2

Raymond McClean (16 January 1933 – 29 January 2011) was an Irish nationalist politician and physician from Northern Ireland.

McClean was born in Coleraine but moved to Derry with his parents when he was six. His father had been in the Royal Air Force but ran a pub in Derry. McClean studied at St Columb's College, Derry, and then proceeded to the Royal College of Surgeons in Ireland, Dublin, where he qualified as a medical doctor in 1958. He then followed his father and enrolled in the Royal Air Force but left after a year and returned to Derry where he worked as a general practitioner and also acted as club doctor to Derry City F.C. and local amateur boxing clubs.

Concerns about the poor housing conditions in the city led him to join the civil rights movement. He was present at Bloody Sunday. Later in life, McClean wrote about Bloody Sunday and the events leading up to it, holding a special interest in the long-term effects of the use of CS Gas.

In 1973, he was elected for the Social Democratic and Labour Party (SDLP) to Londonderry City Council, and was immediately elected as first nationalist mayor of the city since 1923. He held his seat on Londonderry City Council at the 1977 election, but did not stand in 1981.

In the early 1980s, he worked as a medical volunteer in Ethiopia.

He died in 2011, and was survived by his wife Sheila, son Sean, and daughter Sheila.

== Publications ==
McClean authored two books, The Road to Bloody Sunday, and A Cross Shared, and jointly authored a report providing medical perspectives on the deaths of some marchers on Bloody Sunday.

After treating more than 200 cases of CS gas exposure, he had a letter to the British Medical Journal published, on the effects of CS gas use in the Bogside, during The Troubles in Derry.

- The Road to Bloody Sunday, (978-0946451371 Poolbeg Press, 1983), (Revised Edition, Guildhall Press, 1997)

A biography and personal memoir that detailed his experience during Bloody Sunday in Derry. It was firstly published for the 25th anniversary of the march.

- A Cross Shared, (Donegal Democrat, 1988)

Details McCleans experiences working as a Concern volunteer doctor in famine struck Ethiopia in the early 1980s. (A cross shared on Open Library at the Internet Archive)

- Bloody Sunday : the Breglio Report Robert J Breglio, Don Mullan, Raymond McClean. (OCLC 60456684 Bloody Sunday Justice Campaign, 1997)

Provided medical and ballistics analyses of the shooting of 3 of the marchers on the day.

Civic offices
Vacant Title last held by William Beatty (1968–1969)	Mayor of Londonderry; 1973–1974	Succeeded by Jack Allen
