= Fergus McAteer =

Northern Irish politician

Leader of the Irish Independence Party
- In office October 1977 – 1985
- Preceded by: Office created
- Succeeded by: Office abolished

Leader of the Nationalist Party on Derry City Council
- In office 1973 – October 1977
- Preceded by: Office created
- Succeeded by: Office abolished

Member of Derry City Council
- In office 15 May 1985 – 19 May 1989
- Preceded by: New district
- Succeeded by: William McCorriston
- Constituency: Northland
- In office 30 May 1973 – 15 May 1985
- Preceded by: New council
- Succeeded by: District abolished
- Constituency: Londonderry Area E

Personal details
- Born: March 1946 (age 80) Derry, Northern Ireland
- Party: Independent Nationalist (1985 - 1989); Irish Independence Party (1977 - 1985)
- Other political affiliations: Nationalist Party (until 1977)

Fergus McAteer (born March 1946) is an Irish accountant and former nationalist politician in Northern Ireland.

== Background ==
The son of Nationalist Party leader Eddie McAteer, Fergus was active in the civil rights movement of the late 1960s. He was arrested during the events of Bloody Sunday and charged with throwing stones, but the charges were later dropped. McAteer always strongly denied these claims.

McAteer himself became prominent in the Nationalist Party. In 1973, he was elected to Derry City Council, and he was re-elected in 1977. In October 1977 he merged the Nationalist Party with Unity to form the Irish Independence Party (IIP), becoming joint chair with former Unity leader Frank McManus. He stood for the party in Londonderry at the 1979 general election, but could take only fourth place in the poll. He held his seat on the City Council in 1981, with an increased vote. McAteer narrowly held the seat in 1985 and the IIP overall saw their representation on local councils reduced from 21 members in 1981 to 4 members in 1985 and dissolved before the next local election, and McAteer did not restand in 1989.

McAteer started an accountancy firm in 1973, and continued to run the firm as of 2007.
