= 1985 Derry City Council election =

Local govt election in Northern Ireland

- 15 May 1985

All 30 seats to Derry City Council 16 seats needed for a majority
	First party	Second party	Third party
Party	SDLP	Sinn Féin	DUP
Seats won	14	5	5
Seat change	0	▲5	0
	Fourth party	Fifth party
Party	UUP	Irish Independence
Seats won	5	1
Seat change	▲1	▼3

Elections to Derry City Council were held on 15 May 1985 on the same day as the other Northern Irish local government elections. The election used five district electoral areas to elect a total of 30 councillors.

== Election results ==
Derry City Council Election Result 1985
Party	Seats	Gains	Losses	Net gain/loss	Seats %	Votes %	Votes	+/−
SDLP	14	0	0	0	46.7	41.9	15,264	▲0.6
DUP	5	0	0	0	16.7	17.3	6,317	▼1.3
Sinn Féin	5	5	0	▲5	16.7	17.1	6,218	New
UUP	5	1	0	▲1	16.7	13.1	4,778	▼2.5
Irish Independence	1	0	3	▼3	3.3	7.2	2,630	▼6.5
Alliance	0	0	0	0	0.0	2.7	971	▼3.7
Workers' Party	0	0	0	0	0.0	0.7	253	▲0.3

Note: "Votes" are the first preference votes.

== Districts summary ==
Results of the Derry City Council election, 1985 by district
Ward	%	Cllrs	%	Cllrs	%	Cllrs	%	Cllrs	%	Cllrs	%	Cllrs	Total Cllrs
Ward	SDLP		DUP		Sinn Féin		UUP		IIP		Others		Total Cllrs
Cityside	46.5	3	0.0	0	39.6	3	0.0	0	10.0	0	3.9	0	6
Northland	53.7	3	5.4	0	15.5	1	11.3	1	10.9	1	3.2	0	6
Rural	38.2	3	29.3	2	6.4	0	22.9	2	3.2	0	0.0	0	7
Shantallow	58.8	4	0.0	0	25.3	1	0.0	0	10.6	0	5.3	0	5
Waterside	18.5	1	42.4	3	6.2	0	24.2	2	3.3	0	5.4	0	6
Total	41.9	14	17.3	5	17.1	5	13.1	5	7.2	1	3.4	0	30

== District results ==
=== Cityside ===
1985: 3 x SDLP, 3 x Sinn Féin

Cityside - 6 seats
Party	Candidate	FPv%	Count									
Party	Candidate	FPv%	1	2	3	4	5	6	7	8	9	10
SDLP	Patrick Devine*	12.94%	836	844	850	851	1,077					
Sinn Féin	Anne McGuinness	13.47%	870	883	891	909	918	918	981			
Sinn Féin	Hugh Brady	13.12%	848	857	875	890	893	893.73	967.73			
Sinn Féin	Mitchel McLaughlin	12.97%	838	850	854	900	908	908	960			
SDLP	Tony Carlin	10.85%	701	701	708	721	792	835.8	890.26	894.26	914.26	920.26
SDLP	Pat Ramsey	7.89%	510	513	515	551	643	671.47	698.66	704.66	712.66	716.66
SDLP	Jim Clifford	7.72%	499	501	513	548	592	662.08	693.08	697.08	702.08	703.08
Irish Independence	Liam Bradley*	5.71%	369	414	498	539	564	572.03				
SDLP	William Keys*	7.10%	459	463	467	492						
Workers' Party	Eamonn Melaugh	3.92%	253	256	277							
Irish Independence	Samuel Brown	2.23%	144	170								
Irish Independence	John McChrystal*	2.07%	134									
Electorate: 10,598 Valid: 6,461 (60.96%) Spoilt: 213 Quota: 924 Turnout: 6,674 (62.97%)

=== Northland ===
1985: 3 x SDLP, 1 x Sinn Féin, 1 x UUP, 1 x IIP

Northland - 6 seats
Party	Candidate	FPv%	Count									
Party	Candidate	FPv%	1	2	3	4	5	6	7	8	9	10
SDLP	John Tierney*	18.32%	1,417									
Sinn Féin	Bernard McFadden	13.78%	1,066	1,074.14	1,079.14	1,190.14						
UUP	David Davis*	11.30%	874	874	874	875	928	1,329				
SDLP	Leonard Green*	10.34%	800	885.36	893.24	900.56	940	942	952	957	1,220	
SDLP	Anna Gallagher*	9.13%	706	752.42	760.86	772.3	819.96	820.96	831.96	834.96	1,024.16	1,100.16
Irish Independence	Fergus McAteer*	8.81%	681	699.92	731.8	811.12	821.12	822.12	827.12	875.12	947.66	949.16
SDLP	William McCorriston*	7.69%	595	681.68	686.68	691.22	716.88	716.88	723.88	727.88	886.56	922.56
SDLP	John Kerr	8.26%	639	682.12	684.78	688.22	714.1	714.1	723.1	723.1		
DUP	John Noble	5.39%	417	417	417	419	425					
Alliance	Mary Breen	3.15%	244	247.52	248.52	251.52						
Sinn Féin	James McKnight	1.69%	131	135.62	135.62							
Irish Independence	Annie Burke	1.27%	98	100.64	106.64							
Irish Independence	John McCool	0.85%	66	69.08								
Electorate: 12,243 Valid: 7,734 (63.17%) Spoilt: 191 Quota: 1,105 Turnout: 7,925 (64.73%)

=== Rural ===
1985: 3 x SDLP, 2 x DUP, 2 x UUP

Rural - 7 seats
Party	Candidate	FPv%	Count							
Party	Candidate	FPv%	1	2	3	4	5	6	7	8
SDLP	John McNickle*	11.54%	1,004	1,016	1,040	1,042	1,146			
DUP	William Hay*	11.58%	1,008	1,008	1,008	1,048	1,048	1,048	1,390	
DUP	Ellis Allen	9.32%	811	811	811	841	841	841	1,126	
UUP	John Adams	8.89%	774	774	775	1,045	1,048	1,048	1,076	1,174
UUP	Ernest Hamilton	7.88%	686	686	686	853	853	853	928	1,088
SDLP	Annie Courtney	11.09%	965	969	1,028	1,029	1,071	1,078.36	1,078.36	1,080.36
SDLP	Hugh O'Neill	8.02%	698	702	801	802	875	910.88	915.88	915.88
SDLP	George Peoples*	7.61%	662	667	685	688	744	758.72	759.72	759.72
DUP	Mervyn Lindsay	8.39%	730	731	731	742	742	742		
Sinn Féin	Edward McGowan	3.49%	304	516	565	565				
UUP	Robert Bond*	6.09%	530	530	532					
Irish Independence	Michael Breslin	3.17%	276	285						
Sinn Féin	Patrick McNaught	2.92%	254							
Electorate: 12,752 Valid: 8,702 (68.24%) Spoilt: 185 Quota: 1,088 Turnout: 8,887 (69.69%)

=== Shantallow ===
1985: 4 x SDLP, 1 x Sinn Féin

Shantallow - 5 seats
Party	Candidate	FPv%	Count							
Party	Candidate	FPv%	1	2	3	4	5	6	7	8
SDLP	William O'Connell*	19.83%	1,117							
SDLP	Mary Bradley	19.42%	1,094							
SDLP	Noel McKenna	11.63%	655	743.96	772.1	776.4	783.62	883.14	890.28	951.36
Sinn Féin	Gerard Doherty	8.87%	500	501.28	504.78	511.38	517.7	520.7	754.14	796.6
SDLP	Teresa Coyle	7.90%	445	513.48	615.4	629.12	641.66	704.52	707.94	761.88
Sinn Féin	William McCartney	8.68%	489	490.44	491.7	505	518.14	519.3	686.78	734.22
Irish Independence	Robert Hegarty	4.31%	243	246.04	248.14	290.44	474.3	482.76	498.9	
Sinn Féin	Susan O'Hagan	7.72%	435	436.12	437.24	439.56	450.86	453.02		
Alliance	Gerard O'Grady	5.29%	298	302.32	304.56	308.88	316.34			
Irish Independence	James Nicholl	3.27%	184	187.52	191.02	270.44				
Irish Independence	Thomas Mullan	3.08%	174	176.72	179.94					
Electorate: 9,401 Valid: 5,634 (59.93%) Spoilt: 204 Quota: 940 Turnout: 5,838 (62.10%)

=== Waterside ===
1985: 3 x DUP, 2 x UUP, 1 x SDLP

Waterside - 6 seats
Party	Candidate	FPv%	Count								
Party	Candidate	FPv%	1	2	3	4	5	6	7	8	9
DUP	Gregory Campbell*	30.05%	2,374								
DUP	Margaret Buchanan*	10.27%	811	1,402.76							
UUP	James Guy*	10.35%	818	920.96	937.04	999.92	1,001.92	1,159.96			
SDLP	Michael Fegan*	11.06%	874	875.56	875.56	875.56	985.56	1,071.56	1,201.56		
UUP	George Duddy	5.90%	466	532.56	556.56	637.68	638.92	690.48	691.48	693.48	1,136.44
DUP	Annette Hamilton	2.10%	166	560.16	777.84	786.08	786.08	803.16	803.16	803.16	894.12
SDLP	Paul O'Donnell	7.44%	588	588.52	588.52	589.52	640.52	674.52	762.52	817.52	820.52
UUP	Robert Ferris*	5.84%	461	508.84	517.48	543.52	544.52	594.52	597.52	597.52	
Sinn Féin	Michael Roddy	6.11%	483	483	483	484	535	535			
Alliance	Robert McCullough	5.43%	429	434.2	434.92	439.92	446.92				
Irish Independence	Robert Concannon	3.30%	261	262.04	263	263.52					
UUP	Andrew McManus	2.14%	169	185.64	187.56						
Electorate: 11,705 Valid: 7,900 (67.49%) Spoilt: 144 Quota: 1,129 Turnout: 8,044 (68.72%)
