= Nationalist Party (Northern Ireland) =

Political party in Northern Ireland

- Founded: 1918; 108 years ago
- Dissolved: 1977; 49 years ago
- Preceded by: Irish Parliamentary Party
- Merged into: Irish Independence Party
- Ideology: Irish nationalism
- Colours: Green

The Nationalist Party (Irish: An Páirtí Náisiúnach) was the continuation of the Irish Parliamentary Party (IPP), and was formed after the partition of Ireland, by the Northern Ireland-based members of the IPP.

== History ==
Despite conventionally being referred to as a single organisation, the party long existed only as a loose network of small groups, generally operating in a single constituency. Its candidates for both Westminster and Stormont elections were selected by conventions organised on a constituency basis. These arrangements changed in 1966, when a single organisation covering the whole of Northern Ireland was established.

The Nationalist Party did not enter the first House of Commons of Northern Ireland despite winning six seats in the 1921 general election. Leader Joe Devlin took his seat shortly after the 1925 general election and his colleagues followed gradually by October 1927. Intermittently thereafter the party engaged in further periods of abstention, to protest against the "illegal" partition of Ireland. In 1965, it agreed to become the official opposition party in the House of Commons.

This was one of the catalysts of the civil rights movement in Northern Ireland. The party became involved in the Derry civil rights march in October 1968, which ended in violence amidst allegations of police brutality. As a result, the party withdrew from its role as official opposition on 15 October 1968, following the controversy of two weeks earlier.

The party developed a reputation for being disorganised and being little more than a collection of elected members with their own local machines. Many calls were made for the party to develop an overall organisation but it fell apart in the late 1960s. Earlier, many members had formed the National Democratic Party (NDP) after attempts at reform failed. The NDP merged into the Social Democratic and Labour Party (SDLP) at that party's foundation in 1970 and many remaining nationalists followed them. One of the Nationalist Party's last electoral contests was the 1973 election for the Assembly created as part of the Sunningdale Agreement. The lack of success in that election meant that the inevitable outcome was obvious, although a handful of councillors were elected to Omagh District Council and Derry City Council in 1973 and 1977. In October 1977, the party merged with Unity to form the Irish Independence Party which also included non-aligned republicans. Although it was successful for a while in capturing the Republican vote, it faded from view due to the rise of Sinn Féin in the early 1980s.

== Leaders ==
- Joseph Devlin 1918–1934
- Thomas Joseph Campbell 1934–1945
- James McSparran 1945–1958
- Joe Stewart 1958–1964
- Eddie McAteer 1964–1969
- Roderick O'Connor 1969–1972

Following the abolition of Stormont, Eddie McAteer became the effective party leader, while his son Fergus McAteer gradually assumed greater importance.

== Electoral performance ==
See Nationalist Party (Northern Ireland) election results for results in the United Kingdom House of Commons

This chart shows the electoral performance of the Nationalist Party in elections to the Northern Ireland House of Commons

Election	Seats won	±	Position	First Pref votes	%	Government	Leader
1921	6 / 52	Steady	3rd	60,577	11.8%	Abstention	Joseph Devlin
1925	10 / 52	▲4	▲2nd	91,452	23.8%	Abstention	Joseph Devlin
1929	11 / 52	▲1	2nd	34,069	11.7%	Abstention	Joseph Devlin
1933	9 / 52	▼2	2nd	22,269	11.7%	Abstention	Joseph Devlin
1938	8 / 52	▼1	2nd	16,167	4.9%	Abstention	T. J. Campbell
1945	10 / 52	▲2	2nd	32,546	9.1%	Abstention	T. J. Campbell
1949	9 / 52	▼1	2nd	101,445	26.8%	Abstention	James McSparran
1953	7 / 52	▼2	2nd	27,796	10.8%	Abstention	James McSparran
1958	7 / 52	Steady	2nd	36,013	14.9%	Abstention	Joe Stewart
1962	9 / 52	▲2	2nd	45,860	15.1%	Abstention	Joe Stewart
1965	9 / 52	Steady	2nd	26,748	8.2%	Opposition (For the first time)	Eddie McAteer
1969	6 / 52	▼3	2nd	42,315	7.6%	Opposition	Eddie McAteer

== See also ==
- List of Nationalist Party MPs (Ireland)
