= 1918 Waterford City by-election =

UK Parliamentary by-election

The 1918 Waterford City by-election was held on 22 March 1918.

The by-election was held due to the death of the incumbent Irish Parliamentary MP, John Redmond. The Irish Parliamentary candidate William Redmond, his son, defeated Vincent White, the Sinn Féin candidate, by 1,242 votes to 745. Redmond had resigned his seat in East Tyrone to contest the seat.

Redmond campaigned in his army uniform and wearing a black armband. His victory was the second defeat of Sinn Féin at by-elections and gave a temporary boost to the morale of supporters of the Irish Parliamentary Party. He retained his seat in the general election of December that year, continuing to sit at Westminster rather than taking part in the First Dáil.

By-election 29 March 1918: Waterford City
Party	Candidate	Votes	%	±%
Irish Parliamentary	William Redmond	1,242	62.5	N/A
Sinn Féin	Vincent White	745	37.5	New
Majority		497	25.0	N/A
Turnout		1,987	66.9	N/A
Irish Parliamentary hold		Swing	N/A	
