= Peadar Bracken =

Irish republican and civil servant (1887–1961)

Peter Francis Bracken
- Peadar Bracken
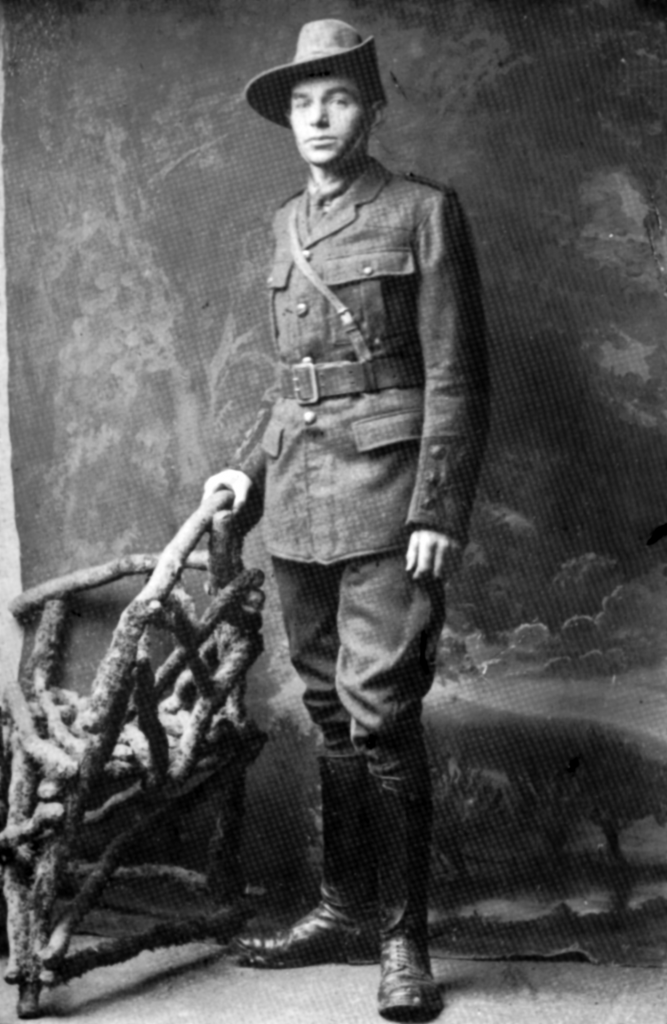
- Portrait of Bracken
- Born: Peter Francis Bracken; 23 January 1887; Sragh, Tullamore, King's County, Ireland
- Died: 19 January 1961 (aged 73); Charleville road, Tullamore
- Burial place: Clonminch Cemetery, Tullamore
- Military career
- Allegiance: Irish Republic
- Service: Irish Volunteers; Irish Republican Army; Local Defence Force
- Service years: 1914–1922, 1940-1945
- Rank: Brigade Commandant; (Irish Volunteers)
- Units: Tullamore Company, Athlone Brigade, Irish Volunteers
- Commands: OC, Athlone Brigade, Irish Volunteers; OC, No.1 Offaly Brigade, IRA
- Conflicts: Easter Rising; Irish War of Independence; The Emergency
- Awards: 1916 Medal; Service Medal (1917–1921)

Peadar Bracken (23 Jan 1887 – 19 Jan 1961) was an Irish republican who fought with the Irish Volunteers during the Easter Rising and War of Independence. He served near the G.P.O. during the Easter Rising. He later served with the Athlone and Offaly No. 1 Brigades during the War of Independence. After the truce he served as a district court clerk.

== Early life and family ==
Peadar Bracken was born Peter Francis Bracken on 23 January 1887 in Sragh, Tullamore, King's County, Ireland. He was the second son of Joseph Bracken and Anne White, who were well-known sculptors in the area. He had four brothers, Patrick, Bernard and James and Michael and one sister, Mrs J. Cahill.

== Early career ==
In 1902, Bracken joined the Gaelic League: Tullamore William Rooney Branch. In 1904, Bracken was recruited into the Irish Republican Brotherhood. He becomes a founding member of Sinn Féin in Tullamore in 1905. He emigrated to Perth, Western Australia in November 1911, and on hearing of the formation of the Irish Volunteers he returned in September 1914. He joined the Tullamore Volunteers and was elected by them as their captain. In Autumn 1915, as Commandant of the Athlone Brigade, he met Patrick Pearse at St. Enda's were he was briefed on the plans for the Rising.

== Tullamore Incident ==
A month before the rising on March 20th a fight broke out in the Volunteer hall in Tullamore. A number of wives whose husbands were in the British army attacked the hall where a number of Volunteers and members of the Cumann na mBan were counting money which had been collected from a GAA match the day previous. Bracken with another Volunteer escorted the women home, and on returning to the hall a hostile crowd attacked the two men. Bracken discharged two shots in the air to keep them back. The Royal Irish Constabulary entered the hall and attempted to disarm the Volunteers. During a scuffle, Bracken shot and wounded Sergeant Ahearn. While four Volunteers were arrested on the night, and several more in subsequent days, Bracken managed to escape and went on the run.

== Easter Rising ==
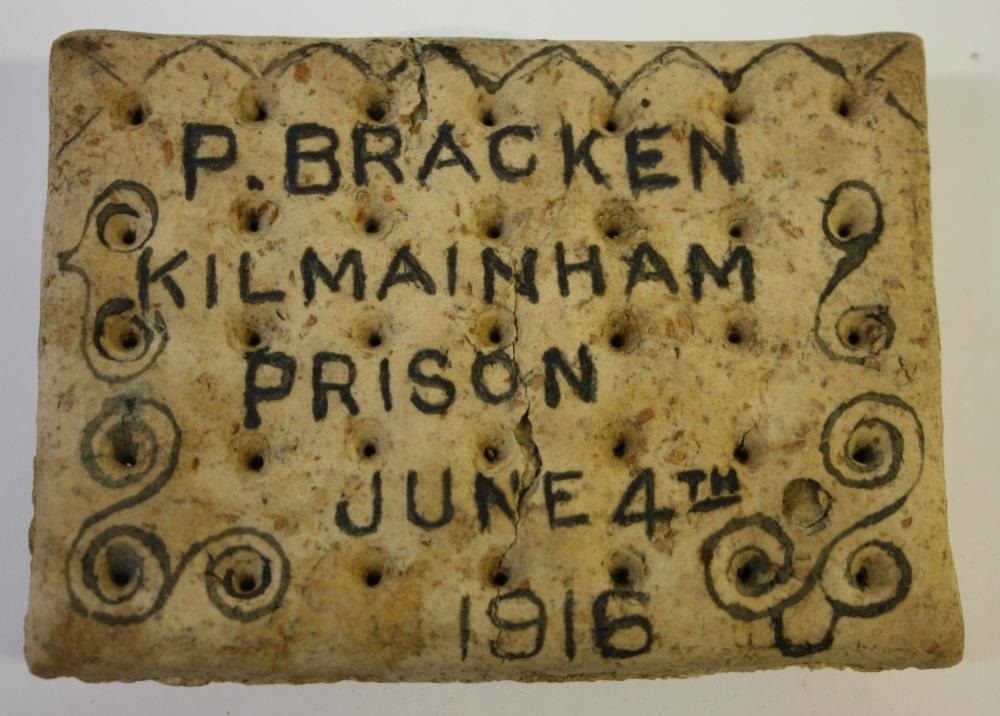
Bracken prison biscuit

On Easter Sunday, the Athlone Volunteers assembled as planned. However, on receiving the countermanding order, Bracken and Seamus O'Brennan went to Dublin for instructions. They stayed overnight with members of the Kimmage company, and on Monday joined them and their commander, George Plunkett as they occupied the G.P.O. As George Plunkett was ordered to remain in the G.P.O. leaving his company without a commander, James Connolly, gave Bracken half the Kimmage company to occupy and hold Kelly's gunpower shop (No. 56 O'Connell Street) and Hopkins and Hopkins (No. 1 O'Connell Street) overlooking O'Connell Street bridge. On Wednesday, his unit fell back to occupy buildings between Middle Abbey Street and Princes Street. and GPO. On Friday, his men retreated to Moore Street with the G.P.O. garrison and surrendered the following day. Bracken was imprisoned in Kilmainham Gaol following the Rising and released in late June.

The original plan for the Athlone Volunteers had been to blow up the railway bridge at Shannonbridge to prevent British reinforcements going to Dublin, and then to link up with the Galway Volunteers. However, with the confusion of the contradictory orders, and the absence of Bracken and O'Brennan, the Volunteers were leaderless and were unsure what to do. They had gelignite, but little experience of using it, and their attempts to blow up the Galway-Dublin railway failed. The Volunteers set up in house of Thomas Malone at Meedin, near Tyrrellspass. The R.I.C. attempted to approach several times and engaged fire with the Volunteers. After receiving word of the surrender in Dublin, most of the Volunteers made their escape, however two were captured by the R.I.C.

== Later years ==
After being released from prison, Bracken returned to Tullamore and re-established his Volunteer company, and re-organised the Athlone Brigade. In October 1917, he attended the Volunteer Convention and was elected as one of the Leinster delegates to the Volunteer Executive, serving until its dissolution in 1921. In 1918, the Offaly No.1 Brigade was established to which his Tullamore Company was transferred to, and which he became the Brigade Commandant of. Largely involved in organisation, he led at attack on Clara R.I.C. barracks in October 1920, and an ambush of Black & Tans at Geashill in November, both locations near his hometown of Tullamore. He was arrested in February 1921 and interned in Curragh Camp until October 1922. Afterwards he transferred to the Home Affairs Department to organise courts in the Midlands, becoming a district court clerk. During the The Emergency he enlisted in the Local Defence Force as a Staff Officer.

== Death ==
Bracken died at home in Tullamore on 19 January 1961. His funeral was granted military honours, with a guard of honour formed from members of old IRA, Army and F.C.Á., while the firing party contained five of his nephews.
