= UCD Economics Society =

The University College Dublin Economics Society is a university society, at University College Dublin (UCD) in Ireland, which "promotes engagement with economics". The society, in its current form, was founded in 2014.

== History ==
The society was first established in 1911 as the Legal & Economic Society. The politician and professor, J.G. Swift MacNeill, gave the inaugural address. Other founding members included Thomas Kettle and Arthur Cox. In the 1930s, the Legal and Economic society split into the UCD Law Society. The Economic Society was founded again in 1968, but later disbanded. The society was re-established in early 2014.

== Events ==
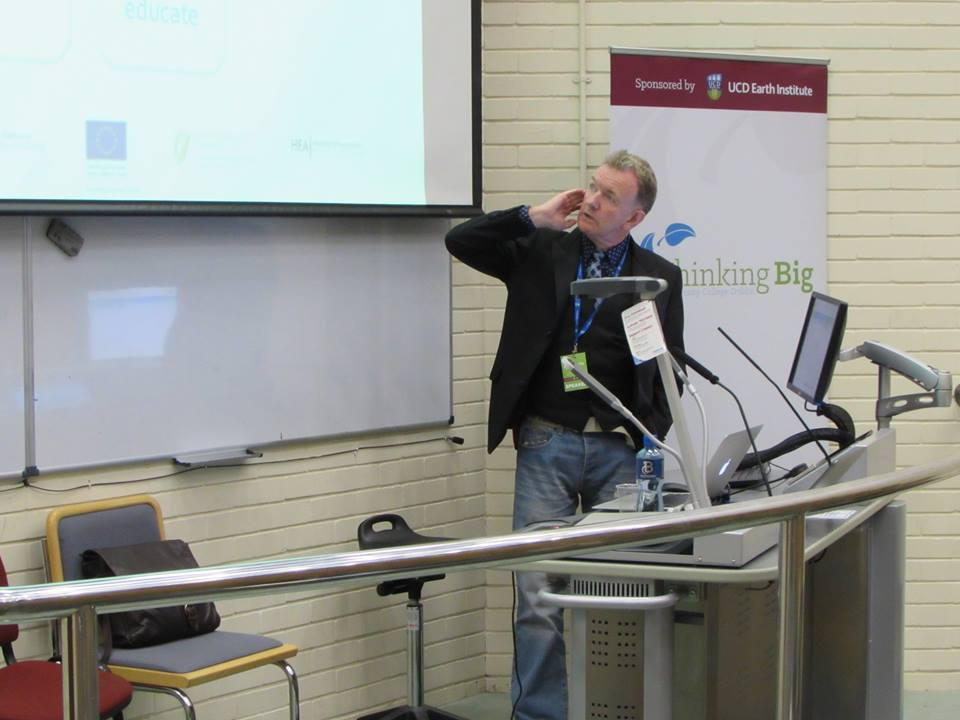
Professor Gregory O'Hare of UCD Earth Institute delivers the opening address at Thinking Big 2014

The society hosts a number of events, including an annual ball.

In 2013 and 2014, the society hosted the "Thinking Big" conference. This two-day conference started in 2013. The 2014 event sought to deal with "subjects affecting the world today" and included discussions on drug policy in Ireland, third world health care, and the corporate tax rate in Ireland. Speakers at the 2014 event included Lucinda Creighton and Vince Cunningham.

Guests who have spoken at society events have included politicians such as Eamon Ryan and Simon Harris, as well as economists like Dambisa Moyo and Jeffrey Sachs. Other speakers to have addressed the society have included governor of the Irish Central Bank Patrick Honohan, and economists David McWilliams and Morgan Kelly.

== Award ==
The society issues an award, the Thomas Kettle Award, to individuals who have made an "outstanding contribution to the field of economics and public policy". The award is named in honor of Thomas Kettle (1880–1916) who was the first Professor of National Economics at UCD and one of the founders of the Legal and Economics Society. Previous recipients of the award include economist Joseph Stiglitz, academic Jeffrey Sachs, journalist David McWilliams, activist Bob Geldof, businessman Peter Sutherland and politician TK Whitaker.
