= Laurence Kettle =

Irish engineer (1878–1960)

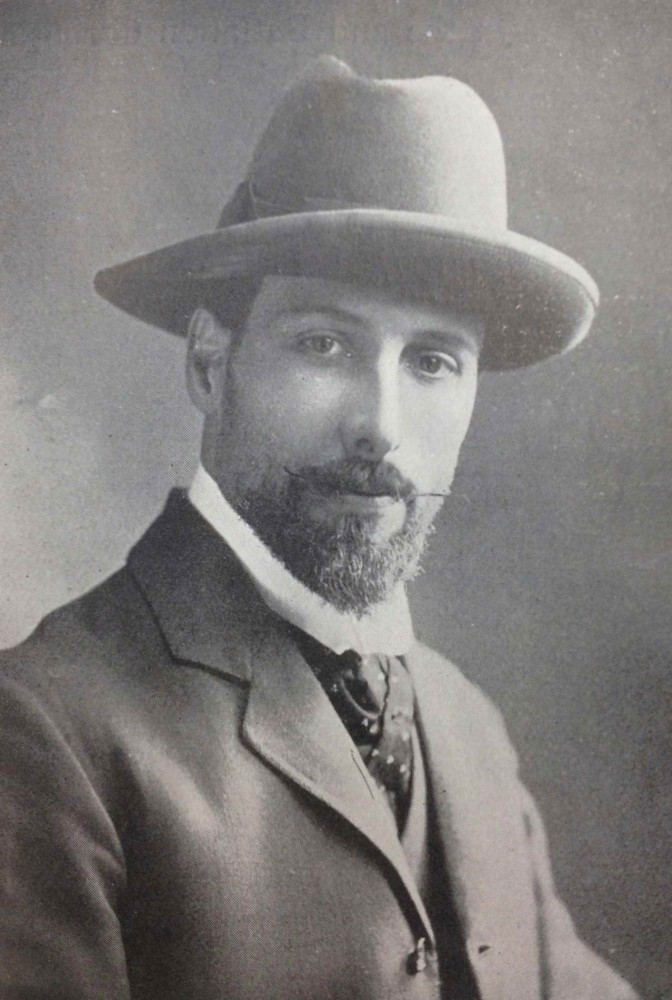
Laurence J. Kettle

Laurence Joseph Kettle D.Sc. (27 February 1878 – 27 August 1960) was a key figure in the industrial and scientific advancement of early twentieth-century Ireland, serving as Chief Engineer of the Dublin Corporation, before being elected as president of the Institution of Civil Engineers and becoming the first chairman of the Industrial Research Committee. He was a founding member of the World Power Conference, a fellow of the Institute of Fuel and a founding member of the Irish Volunteers alongside his brother, the poet and politician, Tom Kettle.

== Family background ==
Laurence Kettle was born in Malahide, County Dublin, one of twelve children of Land League leader and Nationalist politician Andrew Kettle, a founder of the Irish Land League, and his wife, Margaret (née McCourt). He was the brother of writer, poet, Irish Volunteer and Member of Parliament (MP), Tom Kettle, a man widely regarded as one of the greatest minds of his generation, who died in World War I.

Andrew Kettle influenced his sons considerably through his political activities, having been involved from an early age in the constitutional movement to achieve Home Rule. Andrew joined Michael Davitt in the foundation of the Irish Land League and was one of the signatories of the "No Rent Manifesto". He had adhered to Parnell in the 1890 crisis, and stood for election as a nationalist candidate on several occasions.

== Early life and career ==
He received his early education in the O'Connell Schools, Dublin, at Clongowes Wood College, and at Faraday House, where he gained the Maxwell Scholarship. His varied practical training and early experience were gained with R. Stephenson, Newcastle upon Tyne, Maschinenfabrik Oerlikon, Switzerland, Société des Forces Électriques de La Goule, Switzerland, and the General Electric Company. He returned to Dublin in 1906 to join the corporation as works superintendent engineer and became deputy city electrical engineer in 1911 and engineer and manager in 1918. When the undertaking was taken over by the Electricity Supply Board (Ireland) in 1929, he was appointed adviser to the board.

Portrait of Laurence Kettle by Seán Keating, Hugh Lane Gallery, Dublin

From 1934 until his retirement in 1950 he was a member of the board. He also applied his engineering training and judgment towards promoting the development of Irish national resources. His experience as the technical representative in Ireland of the Board of Trade Coal Department led him to give full support to all projects for the economical use of fuel. He acted on the Water Power Board of Ireland Sub-Committee from 1916 to 1918, and during the 1916 Rising was held captive by the insurgents in the College of Surgeons, before resuming his responsibilities for the city’s power supply. In 1912, he took a leading part in the formation of the Irish Volunteers, becoming secretary of its provisional committee together with Eoin MacNeill.

He was a founder-member of the World Power Conference and secretary of the Irish Committee for many years, a member of the Irish Committee of The Institution of Mechanical Engineers and a Fellow of the Institute of Fuel. He joined The Institution as a Student in 1899 and was elected an Associate in 1902, an Associate Member in 1906 and a Member in 1912. He served on the Dublin Local Centre Committee in 1913—14 and on the Irish Centre Committee from 1926 to 1931, being chairman from 1926 to 1928 and serving as honorary treasurer from 1933 to 1934. In 1933 friends and admirers of his public services made him a presentation, including his portrait by Seán Keating, now in the municipal art gallery.

As President of The Institution of Civil Engineers from 1932 to 1934, he delivered an address calling for an investigation into the scientific problems of agriculture, a survey for drainage and a scheme for rural electrification. While president, he organized in 1934 a discussion on the organization of industrial research in Ireland. In that year he was appointed chairman of the newly formed Industrial Research Council and held office until 1957. He became the first chairman of the Industrial Research Committee, resigning in 1947. The movement for industrial research in Ireland owed much to his patient service. On the formation of the Industrial Credit Co. in 1933, to promote and finance by State aid industrial undertakings, he was appointed and remained a director, and in 1938 the National University of Ireland conferred on him the degree of D.Sc. honoris causa.
