= Patrick Doogan =

Irish politician

Patrick Charles Doogan (1831 – 15 June 1906) was an Irish nationalist politician and a Member of Parliament (MP) for East Tyrone from 1895 to 1906.

He was elected as an Anti-Parnellite Nationalist MP for East Tyrone at the 1895 general election, and re-elected at the 1900 general election, this time for the Irish Parliamentary Party. He was again re-elected at the 1906 general election.

He died in office on 15 June 1906, the by-election for his seat was won by Tom Kettle.

Parliament of the United Kingdom
Preceded by William James Reynolds	Member of Parliament for East Tyrone; 1895 – 1906	Succeeded by Tom Kettle
