= 1906 East Tyrone by-election =

UK Parliamentary by-election

- 25 July 1906

East Tyrone (constituency)
	First party	Second party
Candidate	Tom Kettle	William MacCaw
Party	Irish Parliamentary	Irish Unionist
Popular vote	3,018	3,000
Percentage	50.2%	49.8%

The 1906 East Tyrone by-election was held on 25 July 1906. The by-election was held due to the death of the incumbent Irish Parliamentary MP, Patrick Doogan. It was won by 18 votes by the Irish Parliamentary candidate Tom Kettle.

By-election 25 July 1906 : East Tyrone
Party	Candidate	Votes	%	±%
Irish Parliamentary	Tom Kettle	3,018	50.2	−0.2
Irish Unionist	William MacCaw	3,000	49.8	+0.2
Majority		18	0.4	−0.4
Turnout		6.018	95.6	−0.9
Irish Nationalist hold		Swing	-0.2	
