= William James Reynolds =

William James Reynolds (1856 – 23 May 1934) was an Irish nationalist politician and member of parliament (MP) in the House of Commons of the United Kingdom of Great Britain and Ireland.

He was elected as an Irish Parliamentary Party MP for the East Tyrone constituency at the 1885 general election, and was re-elected at the 1886 general election.

When the Irish Parliamentary Party split in 1890, he was an Anti-Parnellite and joined the Irish National Federation (INF) in 1891. He was re-elected as an INF MP at the 1892 general election. He did not contest the 1895 general election.

Parliament of the United Kingdom
New constituency	Member of Parliament for East Tyrone; 1885 – 1895	Succeeded by Patrick Doogan
