= Tom Kettle =

Irish economist, politician and war poet (1880–1916)

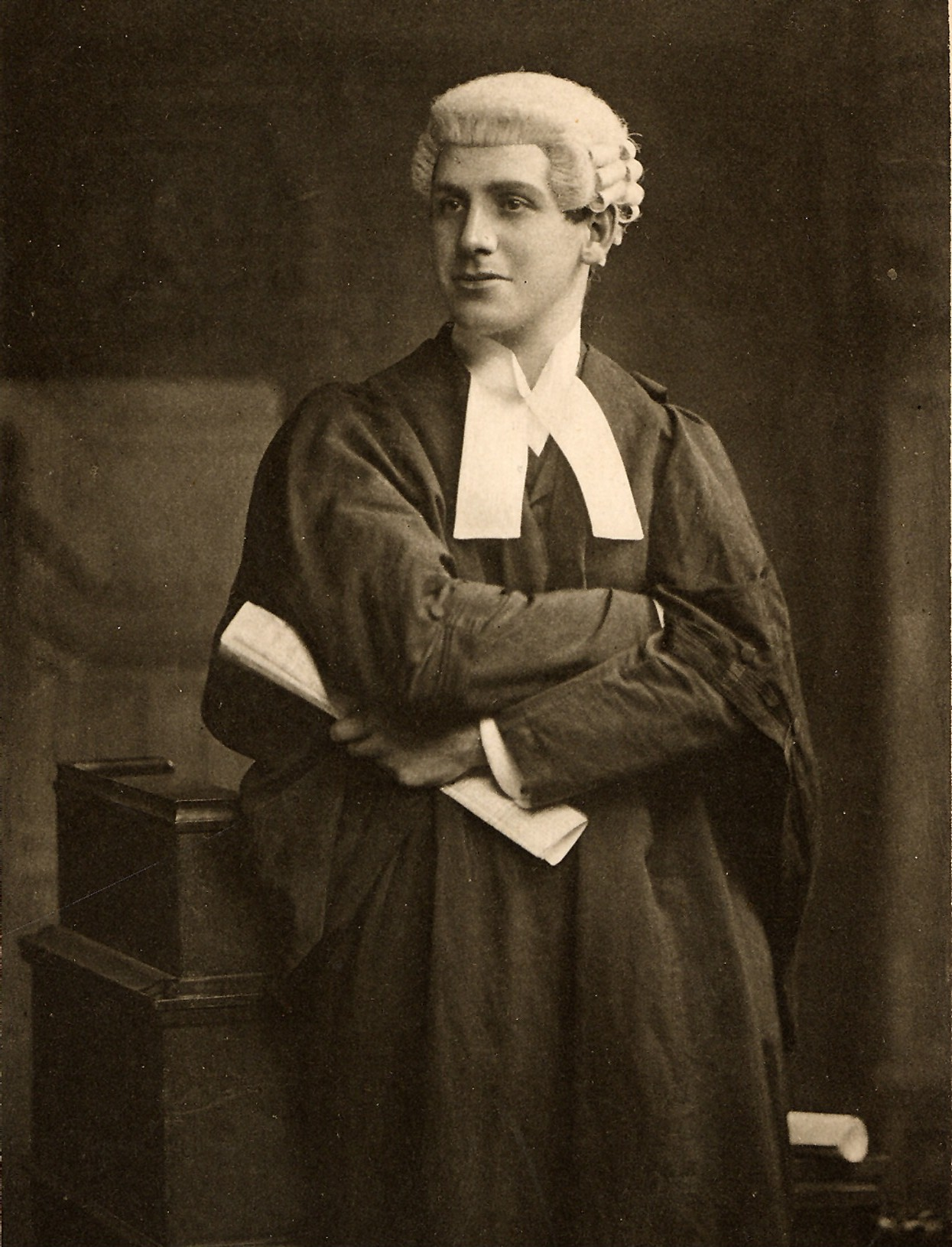
- Kettle in 1905

Member of Parliament for East Tyrone
- In office 5 July 1906 – 28 November 1910
- Preceded by: Patrick Doogan
- Succeeded by: William Redmond

Personal details
- Born: 9 February 1880 Dublin, Ireland
- Died: 9 September 1916 (aged 36) near Ginchy, France
- Party: Irish Parliamentary Party
- Spouse: Mary Sheehy (m. 1909)
- Parent: Andrew Kettle (father)
- Relatives: Laurence Kettle (brother)
- Education: University College Dublin

Military service
- Branch/service: British Army
- Years of service: 1914–1916
- Rank: Lieutenant
- Unit: Royal Dublin Fusiliers
- Battles/wars: World War I; Battle of the Somme †

Thomas Michael Kettle (9 February 1880 – 9 September 1916) was an Irish economist, journalist, barrister, writer, war poet, soldier and Home Rule politician. As a member of the Irish Parliamentary Party, he was Member of Parliament (MP) for East Tyrone from 1906 to 1910 at Westminster. He joined the Irish Volunteers in 1913, then on the outbreak of World War I in 1914 enlisted for service in the British Army, with which he was killed in action on the Western Front in the autumn of 1916. He was a much admired old comrade of James Joyce, who considered him to be his best friend in Ireland, as well as the likes of Francis Sheehy-Skeffington, Oliver St. John Gogarty and Robert Wilson Lynd.

He was regarded as one of the leading political figures of the 20th century and belonged to the generation that revitalised Irish party politics and advanced the constitutional movement for All-Ireland Home Rule. Known for his eloquence, sharp intellect, and incisive wit, his death was widely considered a significant loss to Ireland’s political and intellectual life.

As G. K. Chesterton surmised, "Thomas Michael Kettle was perhaps the greatest example of that greatness of spirit which was so ill rewarded on both sides of the channel [...] He was a wit, a scholar, an orator, a man ambitious in all the arts of peace; and he fell fighting the barbarians because he was too good a European to use the barbarians against England, as England a hundred years before has used the barbarians against Ireland".

== Early life ==
Thomas Kettle was born in Malahide or Artane, Dublin, the seventh of twelve children of Andrew Kettle, a leading Irish nationalist politician, progressive farmer, agrarian agitator and founding member of the Irish Land League, and his wife, Margaret (née McCourt). One of his brothers was the industrial pioneer, Laurence Kettle.

Andrew Kettle influenced his son considerably through his political activities, having been involved from an early age in the constitutional movement to achieve Home Rule. Andrew joined Michael Davitt in the foundation of the Irish Land League and was one of the signatories of the "No Rent Manifesto". He had adhered to Charles Stewart Parnell in the 1890 crisis, and stood for election as a nationalist candidate on several occasions.

Thomas was raised in comfortable rural surroundings. Like his brothers he was educated at the Christian Brothers' O'Connell School at Richmond Street, Dublin, where he excelled. In 1894 he went to study with the Jesuits at Clongowes Wood College in County Kildare, known as a wit and a good debater. He enjoyed athletics, cricket and cycling and attained honours in English and French when leaving.

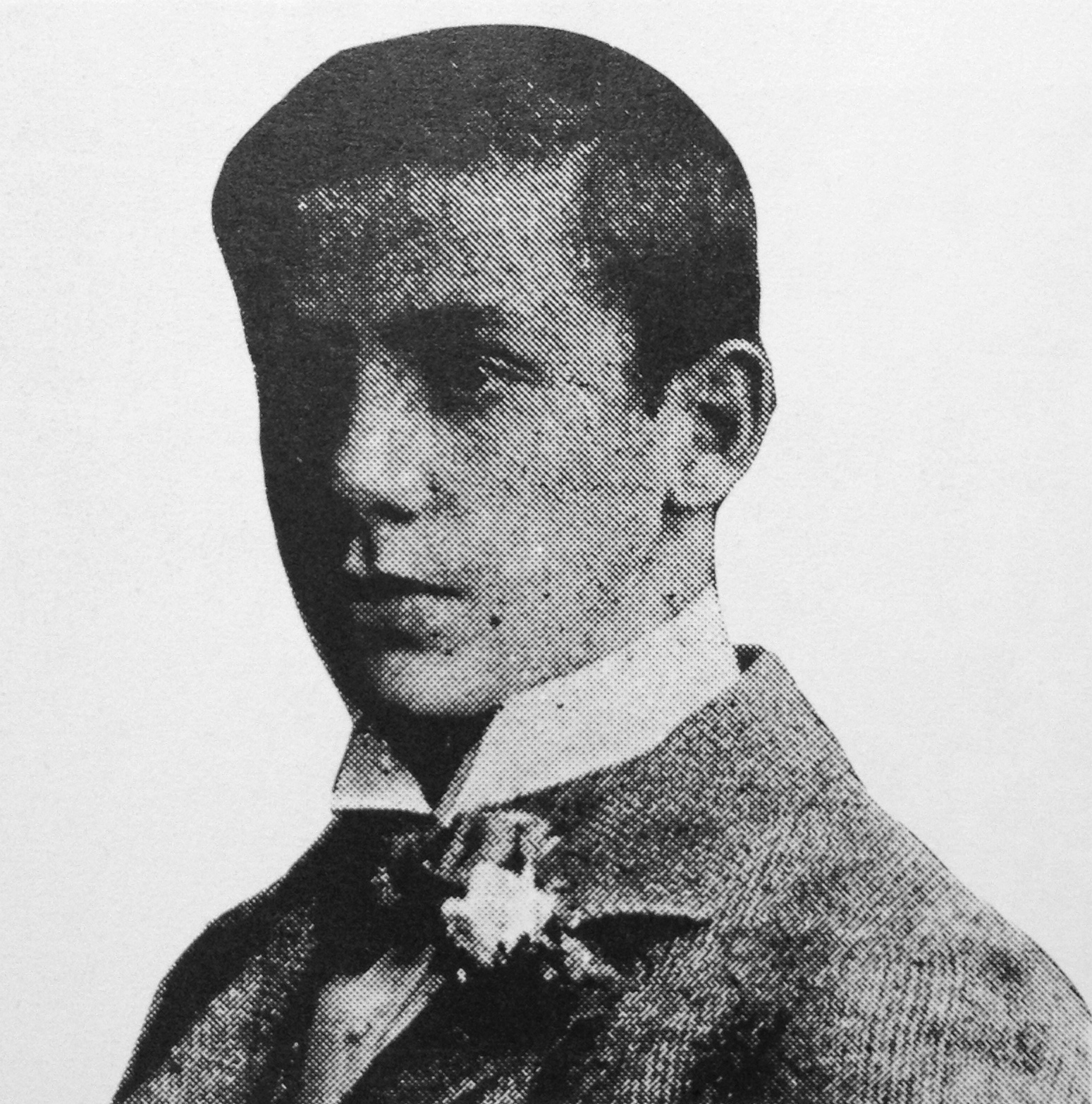
Thomas M. Kettle as a student at Clongowes Wood College

Entering University College Dublin in 1897, he was regarded as a charismatic student. Surrounded by ambitious and politically minded young men he quickly established himself as a leading student politician and a brilliant scholar. He was elected to the prestigious position of auditor of the Literary and Historical Society, 1898–1899. His friends and contemporaries at UCD included Hugh Kennedy, Francis Sheehy-Skeffington, Oliver St. John Gogarty and James Joyce.

Tom Kettle distributed pro-Boer leaflets during the early months of the South African Second Boer War, and protested against the Irish Literary Theatre production of Yeats' The Countess Cathleen in 1899 over its irreligious story of an unlikely kind-hearted aristocrat who sells her soul to save her tenants. Due to illness he interrupted his studies in 1900, his health always being fragile. He went abroad to renew his spirits by travelling on the continent, improving his German and French. Returning to Dublin he renewed his studies, and in 1902 took a BA in mental and moral science.

== Journalism ==
He then read law after admission to the Irish Law bar in 1903, qualifying as a barrister in 1905. He practiced sporadically, devoting most of his time to political journalism. He maintained his contacts to University College and his fellow students, participating in debates, contributing to and becoming editor of the college newspaper. He helped to found the Cui Bono Club, a discussion group for recent graduates.

A vocal supporter of the Home Rule-seeking Irish Parliamentary Party (IPP), Kettle strengthened his links with the constitutional movement by co-founding and becoming president of the Young Ireland Branch of the United Irish League in 1904. He attracted the attention of the Irish Party leader John Redmond. Kettle declined the offer to stand for a parliamentary seat, instead edited a newspaper, The Nationist, an unconventional weekly journal. The paper pursued an extreme pro-Irish Party line, at the same time reflecting Kettle's liberal and often controversial views on a wide range of topics, education, women's rights, the Irish Literary Revival. He resigned his editorship in 1905 on the grounds of a controversy about an allegedly anti-clerical article.

== Parliamentarian ==
After the death in 1906 of Patrick Doogan, the MP for East Tyrone, Kettle accepted the candidature for the vacant parliamentary seat at the resulting by-election. He won the seat by a narrow majority of 18 votes, becoming one of the few young men to gain admission to the aging Irish Party in the House of Commons of the United Kingdom of Great Britain and Ireland, during the first two decades of the twentieth century.

Seen as a future party leader, he went to America in late 1906, participating in a number of propaganda and fund-raising meetings. In the House of Commons at Westminster he was a staunch supporter of the Irish Party and its constitutional path to Home Rule, also encouraging the provision of higher education for Irish Catholics and improving Ireland's economic condition.

He was deeply steeped in European culture. Kettle's ideal was an Ireland identified with the life of Europe. In "Ireland" he wrote,"My only programme for Ireland consists in equal parts of Home Rule and the Ten Commandments. My only counsel to Ireland is, that to become deeply Irish, she must become European."

== Academic career ==
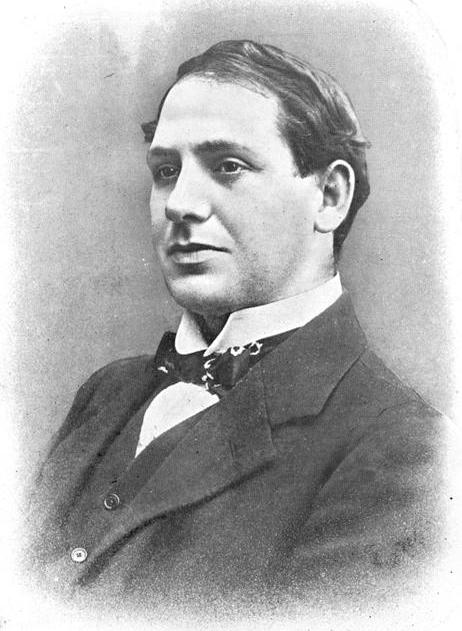
Thomas Michael Kettle

In 1908 he was the first Professor of National Economics at University College Dublin, a constituent college of the new National University of Ireland. Increasingly busy and in demand as a speaker, he had difficulty combining academic work with his work as an MP. He was a popular professor and his interest in economics was reflected in a number of publications concerning financial issues. He was friends with Thomas MacDonagh, and wrote for his magazine The Irish Review. In 1911, he helped to establish the Legal & Economic Society of the university along with his fellow professor J.G. Swift MacNeill. In September 1909 he married Mary Sheehy, a fellow graduate who had been the muse of the adolescent James Joyce and is the model for the lead female character in Joyce's story "Araby" and Miss Ivors in "The Dead", both collected in Dubliners.

He retained his East Tyrone seat in the January 1910 general election but did not contest the second election in December. Even though out of parliament he remained an active IPP member publishing a number of essays reiterating his support for attaining Home Rule by constitutional means. He enthusiastically greeted the 1912 Home Rule Bill, likewise the removal of the veto power of the Lords, this veto being the last obstacle to Home Rule. On the other hand, he brusquely dismissed Unionist fears of the bill's possible effects, giving the cause of Home Rule prevalence before all other considerations. On 12 January 1912, he gave a talk to the National Liberal Club's Political and Economic Circle.

== 1913–1914 ==
During the 1913 Dublin strike and lockout, unlike other contemporary upper-class commentators, Kettle supported the locked out workers and published a series of articles which revealed the terrible living and working conditions of Dublin's poor, and was involved in the formation of a peace committee which endeavoured to negotiate a settlement between workers and employers.

In 1913 Kettle also became involved with the paramilitary Irish Volunteers, a new Irish Nationalist militia that formed in response to the creation in the north of the Ulster Volunteers by Edward Carson to oppose the creation of an all-Ireland government based in Dublin via the passage in the British Parliament in London of the Government of Ireland Act 1914. In July 1914 he left Dublin and travelled to Belgium on behalf of the Irish Volunteers seeking to purchase rifles and ammunition for the organization's armoury. While he was in Belgium World War I broke out, and, finding this more interesting than militia arms procurement, he became an on the scene war correspondent for the Daily News, reporting on the opening moves of the armies of the II Reich as they marched Westwards. Travelling throughout Flanders in August and September 1914, he became increasingly alarmed by the punitive measures that he witnessed being implemented against the Belgian civilian population by the Imperial German Army against even the lightest civil resistance to the passage of its troop columns moving through that country heading into France. Kettle perceived at this moment a threat to Europe's liberty from the nature of the II Reich, and began dispatching war reports from Brussels warning against the dire threat to Europe from Prussian militarism, depicting the conflict as "A war of Civilization vs Barbarianism".

== World War I ==
With Ireland having become embroiled in the Great War Kettle returned to Dublin. On arrival back home he sided with the National Volunteers in a split within the Irish Volunteers nationalist militia's ranks between those for whom Irish independence was all, and were increasingly eyeing the possibility an armed confrontation with the British Government (with the threat of an armed insurrection against Irish Nationalism from Ulster having abated with the Ulster Volunteers having enlisted en masse into the British Army to fight in World War I), and those who followed John Redmond's constitutional lead in accepting the Government of the United Kingdom's public undertaking of a restoration of self-government to Ireland in its domestic affairs, temporarily deferred until the war's end, and who were also concerned about matters beyond Ireland's shores with Europe's future in the 20th Century now being decided.

In consequence Kettle volunteered for active service with the 7th Battalion of the Leinster Regiment, but was refused on the grounds of fragile health. He subsequently received a commission into the British Army with the rank of Lieutenant, restricted to garrison service at home.

He applied to be an Irish Parliamentary Party candidate for a by-election in East Galway, and though not selected his support for the party did not abate, continuing to advocate both home rule and voluntary enlistment with the British Arms, maintaining that Irishmen had a moral duty to join the allied stand against the displayed tyranny on the European continent of the II Reich. He asserted that "Having broken like an armed burglar into Belgium, Germany was thereby guilty of a systematic campaign of murder, pillage, outrage, and destruction, planned and ordered by her military and intellectual leaders."

By 1916 Kettle had published more than ten books and pamphlets, contributed numerous articles to journals and newspapers on Irish politics, literary reviews, poetry and essays, philosophical treatises and translations from German and French. Although at times melancholy at the war's immense escalating intensity across Europe, consuming ever more men and causing destruction to its nations, he continued to apply to be sent to the Western Front on active service, until, with his health somewhat improved, he received a commission into the 9th Battalion of the Royal Dublin Fusiliers, amidst the 16th (Irish) Division, which in early 1916 he went to France with, serving alongside Emmet Dalton, a 19-year-old subaltern, whose family Kettle had known and frequented the Dublin home of pre-war.

The conditions in the trenches of the Western Front broke his health again, and he returned to Dublin shortly after the failure of the abortive Easter Revolution on sick leave, seeing the wreckage of the city's centre caused by the fighting that had occurred there. He was also beginning to rely too heavily on alcohol in this period as a psychological palliative to the stress of military active service. While in Dublin he rejected offers of a permanent staff position, and returned to rejoin the Battalion in the line. On leaving Ireland on 14 July 1916 he predicted that the Easter Revolutionaries of 1916 would be lionized as patriots in the near future of Ireland's history, while those who had fought with the British Arms in World War I would be condemned: "...these men will go down to history as heroes and martyrs and I will go down, if I go down at all as a bloody British officer." Kettle was angered by actions of the Revolutionary faction that had staged the failed revolt, feeling that they were marring Constitutional Nationalism's long worked for strategy of the rebirth of a sovereign Irish state finding its place amidst the nations in a peaceful fashion, with good spirit amidst its neighbours in Britain.

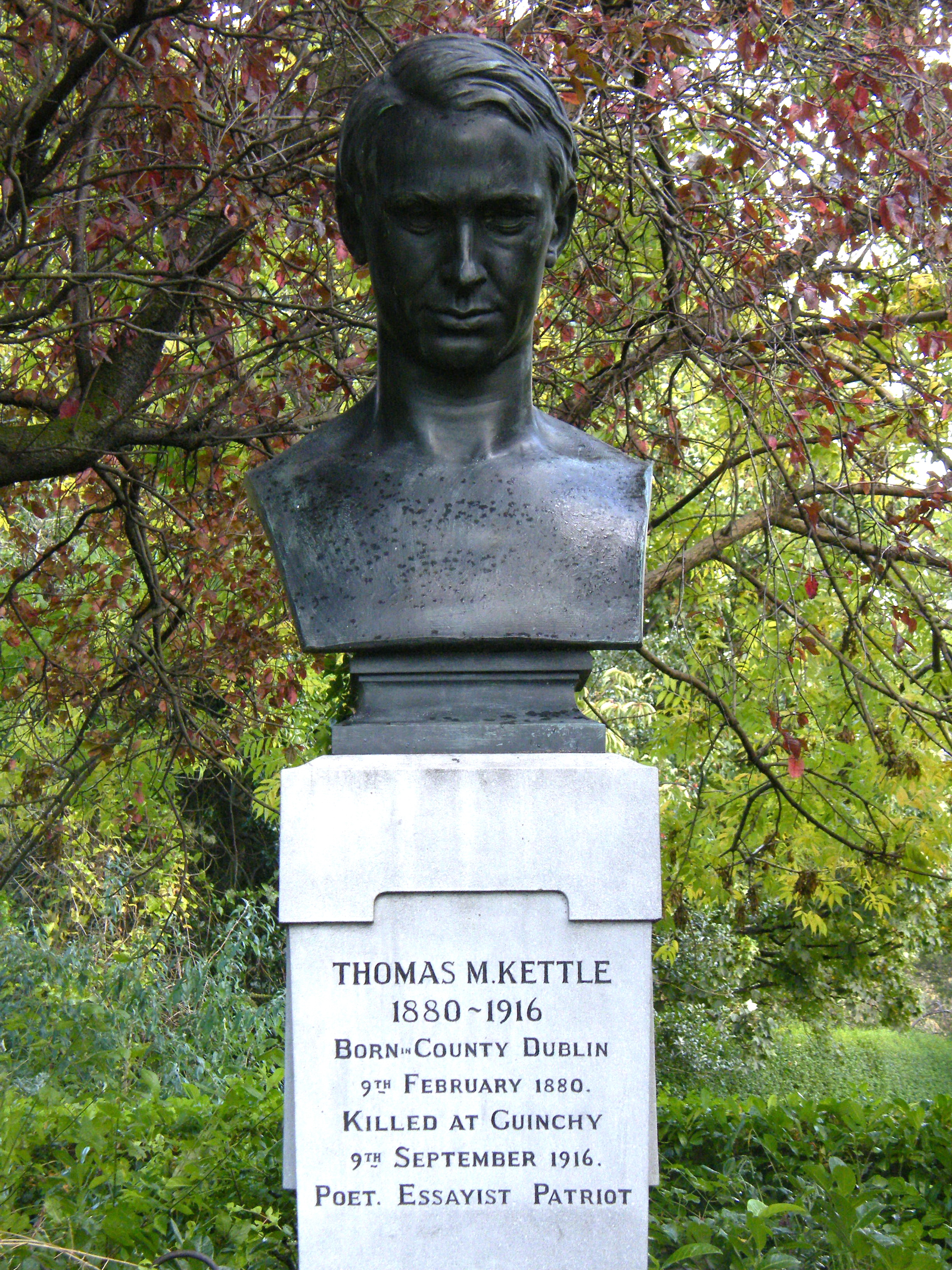
Thomas Kettle Memorial

It was as an Irish soldier in a war in the defense of European civilisation that he entered the war. He was deeply steeped in Europe's cultures. Kettle's ambition for Ireland in the 20th century was a land and culture with the European continent as its polestar. He wrote: "My only programme for Ireland consists in equal parts of Home Rule and the Ten Commandments. My only counsel to Ireland is, that to become deeply Irish, she must become European"; and later, "Used with the wisdom that is sown in tears and blood, this tragedy of Europe may be and must be the prologue to the two reconciliations of which all statesmen have dreamed, the reconciliation of Protestant Ulster with Ireland, and the reconciliation of Ireland with Great Britain."

In a letter, sent to his friend Joseph Devlin from France shortly before his death, Kettle wrote: "I hope to come back. If not, I believe that to sleep here in the France that I have loved is no harsh fate, and that so passing out into silence, I shall help towards the Irish settlement. Give my love to my colleagues – the Irish people have no need of it."

== Death ==
Kettle was killed in action with 'B' Company of the 9th Battalion of the Royal Dublin Fusiliers in an attack on German lines on 9 September 1916, near the village of Ginchy during the Battle of the Somme. During the advance, Kettle was felled when the Dublin Fusiliers were 'struck with a tempest of fire', and having risen from the initial blow, he was struck again and killed outright. His body was buried in a battlefield grave by the Welsh Guards, but the grave was subsequently lost trace of. His name is etched on the monumental arched gateway for the missing of the Somme at Thiepval. He was 36 years old.

The poet George William Russell wrote about Kettle, comparing his sacrifice with those who led the 1916 Easter Rising:

You proved by death as true as they,
In mightier conflicts played your part,
Equal your sacrifice may weigh
Dear Kettle of the generous heart.

== Legacy ==
The erection of a commemorative bronze bust of Kettle in Dublin, commissioned from the sculptor Albert Power and finished in 1921, was delayed for almost twenty years by controversy and bureaucratic obstruction due to the antipathy of the Irish Free State authorities towards Irishmen who had fought in World War I. It was finally raised in 1937, without an unveiling ceremony, in St. Stephen's Green. A stone tablet commemorates him in the Island of Ireland Peace Park, at Messines, Belgium and he is listed on the bronze plaque in the Four Courts Dublin which commemorates the 26 Irish barristers killed in the Great War. Kettle is commemorated on Panel 1 of the Parliamentary War Memorial in Westminster Hall in London, one of 22 present and former Members of Parliament that lost their lives during World War I to be named on that memorial. A further act of commemoration came with the unveiling in 1932 of a manuscript-style illuminated book of remembrance for the House of Commons, which includes a short biographical account of the life and death of Kettle.

The Literary and Historical Society (University College Dublin) has historically held an annual wreath-laying ceremony at the bust in St. Stephen's Green.

The UCD Economics Society has also named their life membership award in memory of Thomas Kettle. Notable recipients include Professor Joseph Stiglitz, Irish Central Bank Governor Patrick Honohan, and Peter Sutherland, former Director-General of The World Trade Organization.

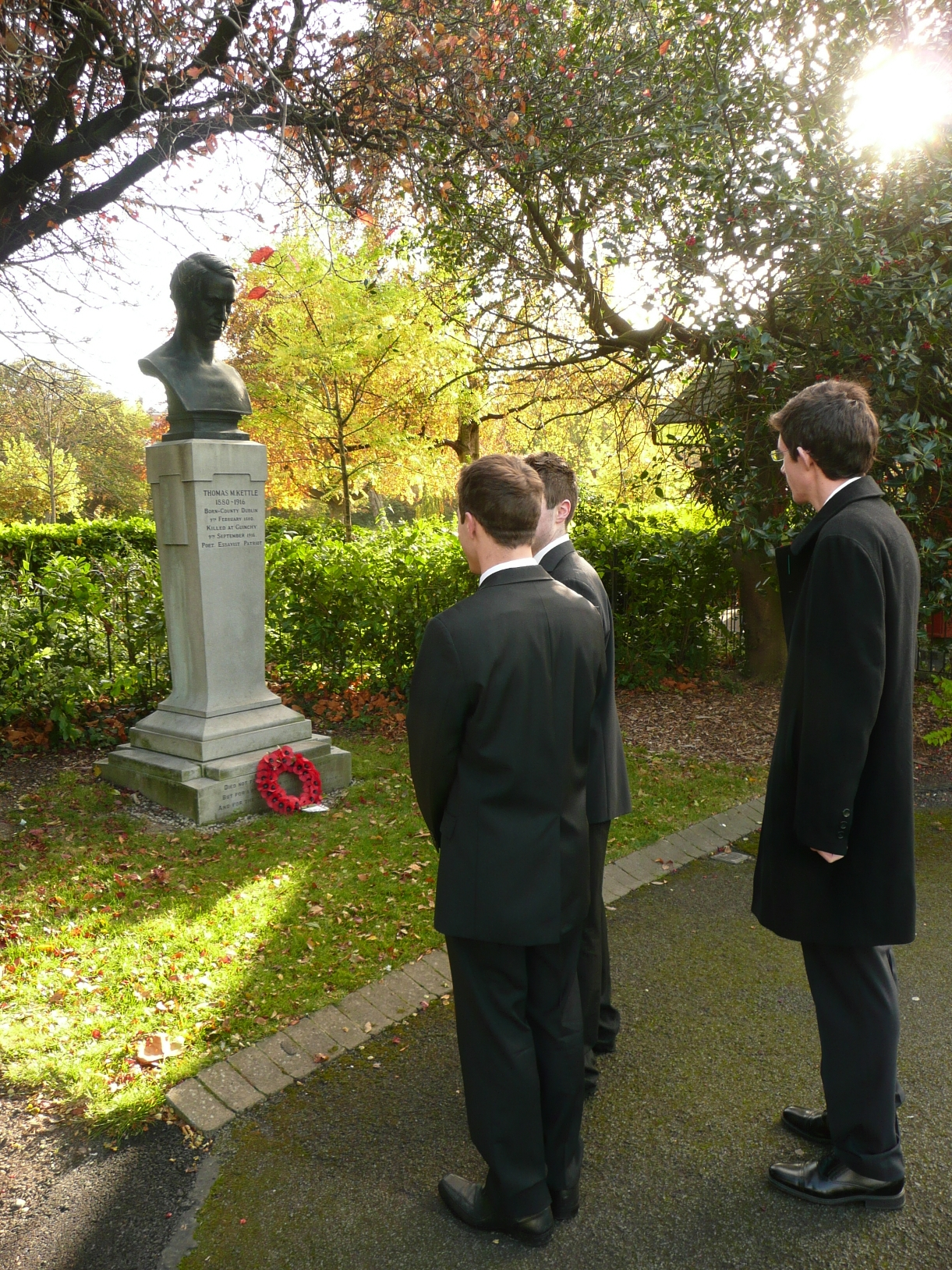
The 153rd session of the Literary and Historical Society UCD remembering their fallen auditor

At the time of his death, a tribute to him appeared in the French journal L'Opinion:

All parties bowed in sorrow over his grave, for in the last analysis they were all Irish, and they knew that in losing him, whether he was friend or enemy, they had lost a true son of Ireland. A son of Ireland? He was more. He was Ireland! He had fought for all the aspirations of his race, for Independence, for Home Rule, for the Celtic Renaissance, for a United Ireland, for the eternal Cause of Humanity . . . He died, a hero in the uniform of a British soldier, because he knew that the faults of a period or of a man should not prevail against the cause of right or liberty.

== Family ==
On 8 September 1909, Kettle married Mary Sheehy (born 1884), a fellow graduate of the Royal University, a suffragist, and, like Kettle, a member of a well-known nationalist family. Her father, David Sheehy, was a nationalist MP. Tom and Mary Kettle had one child, a daughter, Elisabeth ("Betty"), who was born on 31 January 1913 (though oddly, her birth registration is on a page of 1916 births).

Tom Kettle was also the brother-in-law (by his wife, the former Mary Sheehy) of both Francis Skeffington and the journalist Frank Cruise O'Brien, father of the Labour TD and Irish government minister, later UK Unionist Party politician, Conor Cruise O'Brien. Father Eugene Sheehy, a brother of David Sheehy, was a priest, president of the local branch of the Irish National Land League at Kilmallock and founder member of the Gaelic Athletic Association.

== Poetry ==
Kettle's best-known poem is a sonnet, "To My Daughter Betty, the Gift of God", written just days before his death. The last lines are an answer to those who criticised Irishmen for fighting in the British Armed Forces, saying that they "Died not for flag, nor King, nor Emperor/But for a dream, born in a herdsman's shed/and for the secret Scripture of the poor." A less well-known poem, "Reason in Rhyme", was said by Kettle's friend Robert Lynd to represent "his testament to England as his call to Europeanism is his testament to Ireland."

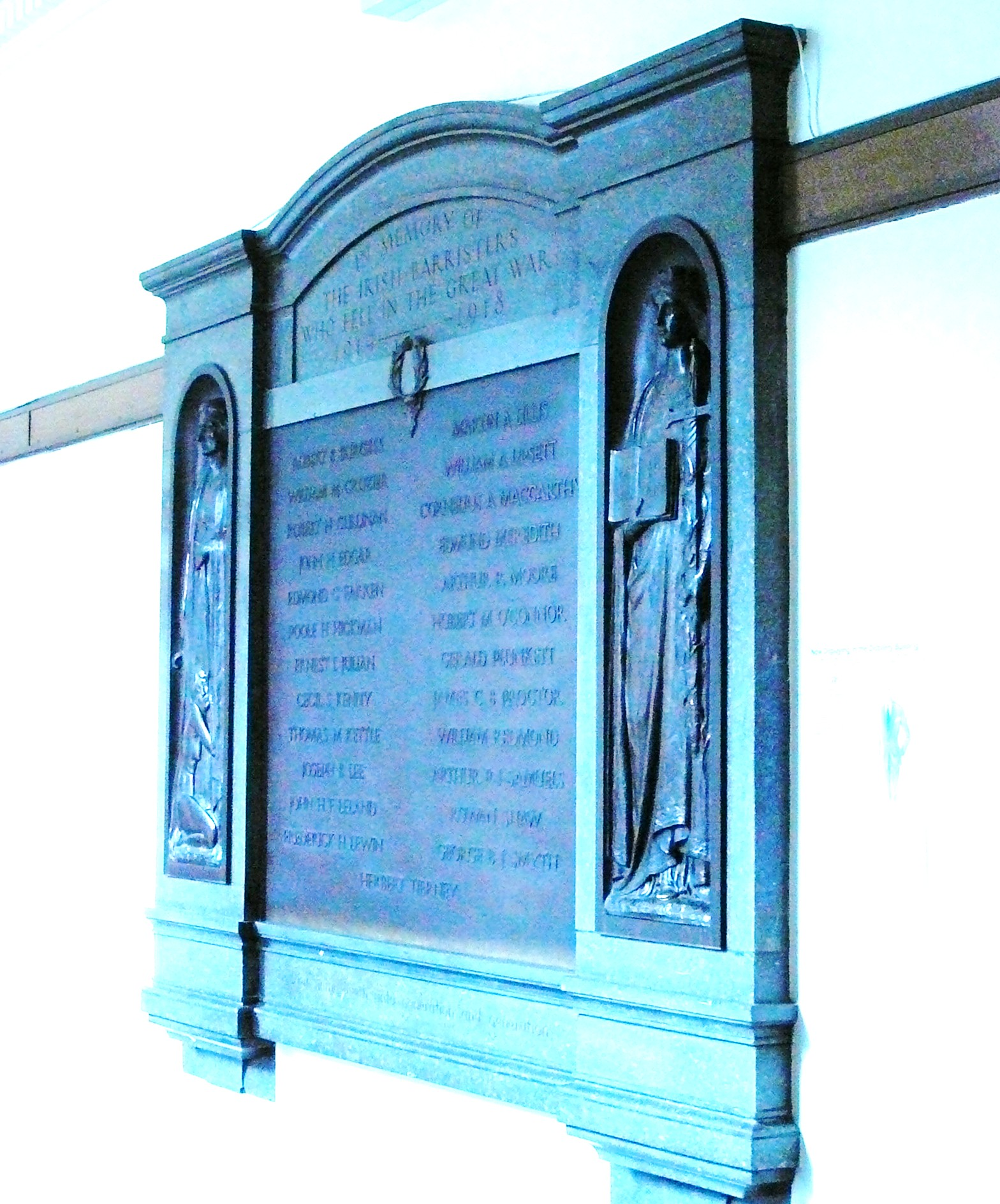
Dublin Four Courts Plaque inscribed: In Memory of the Irish Barristers who fell in the Great War 1914–1918. The list includes the name of Thomas Kettle.

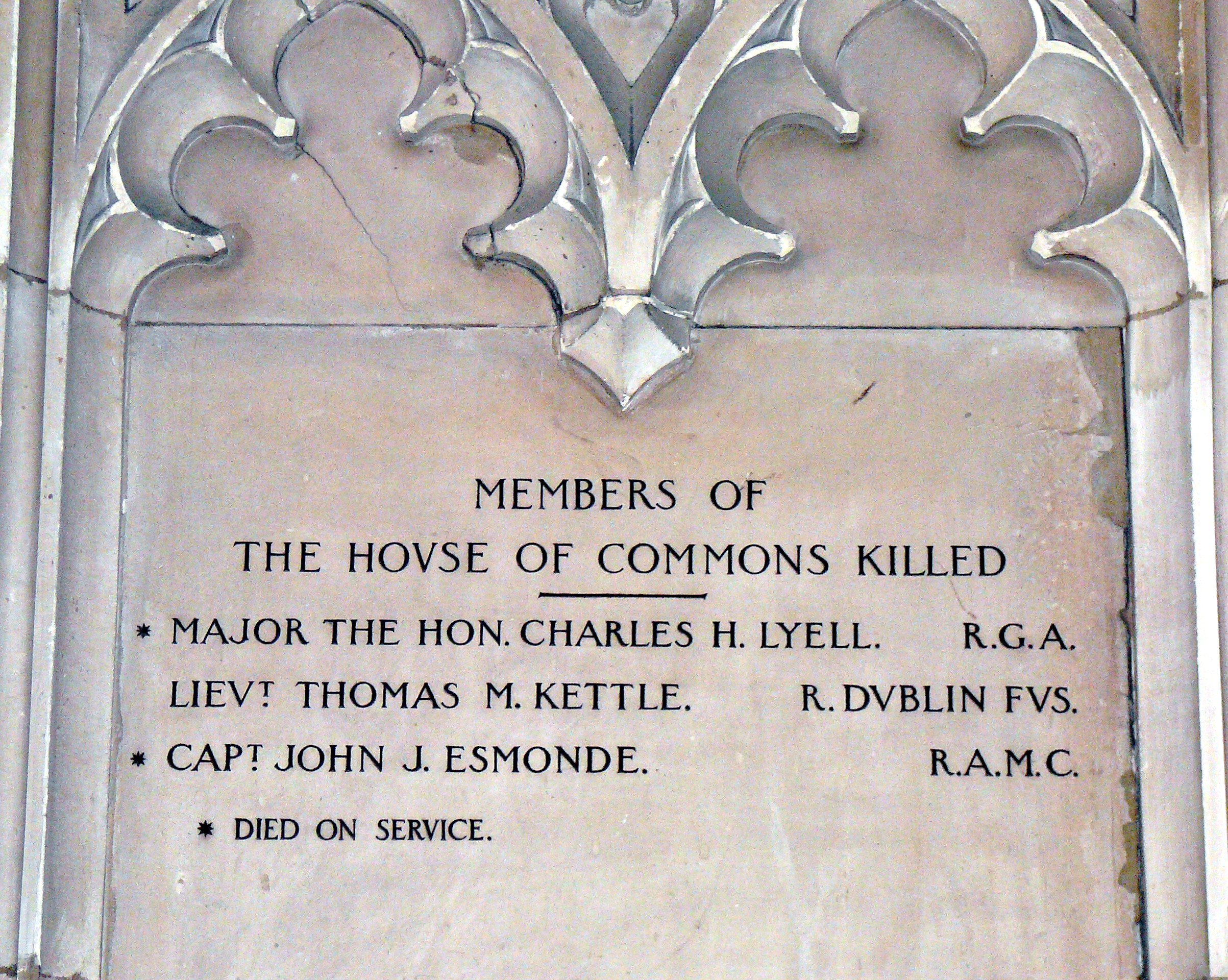
House of Commons London panel commemoration Thomas M. Kettle killed

== Works ==
- The Day's Burden, Studies, Literary and Political (1910)
- Home Rule Finance. An Experiment in Justice (1911)
- Christianity and the Leaders of Modern Science (1911
- The Open Secret of Ireland (1912)
- Poems and Parodies (1912)
- Irish Orators and Oratory (1915) editor
- Battle Songs of the Irish Brigades (1915)
- To My Daughter Betty, The Gift of God (1916)
- The Ways of War (1917), reasons for serving in World War I (posthumous publication))
- An Irishman's Calendar, edited by Mary Kettle

== Sources ==
- A Dictionary of Irish History since 1800, D. J. Hickey & J. E. Doherty, p. 279, Gill & MacMillan (1980) ISBN 9780717115679
- The Enigma of Tom Kettle: Irish patriot, essayist, poet, British soldier J. B. Lyons (1983) ISBN 9780907606123
- Oxford Dictionary of National Biography p. 459, Oxford University Press (2004) ISBN 9780198614128
- Wigs and Guns, Irish Barristers and the Great War, Anthony B. Quinn, Four Courts Press (2005); ISBN 1-85182-935-0
- The Glorious Madness, Tales of The Irish and The Great War, Bunbury, Turtle (2014) ISBN 9780717162345
- Tom Kettle and Emmet Dalton; Mad Guns and Invisible Wands pp. 99–115, Gill & Macmillan, Dublin 12 (2014) ISBN 978 0717 16234 5
- The Somme: The Darkest Hour on the Western Front, Peter Hart, Pegasus Books (2008); ISBN 978-1-60598-081-2, p. 340–342

== Great War memorials ==
- Irish National War Memorial Gardens, Dublin.
- Island of Ireland Peace Park Messines, Belgium.
- Thiepval Memorial, Thiepval, France
- Menin Gate Memorial Ypres, Belgium.

Parliament of the United Kingdom
Preceded by Patrick Doogan	Member of Parliament for East Tyrone; 1906 – December 1910	Succeeded by William Redmond
