= William Redmond (Irish politician, born 1886) =

Irish politician (1886–1932)

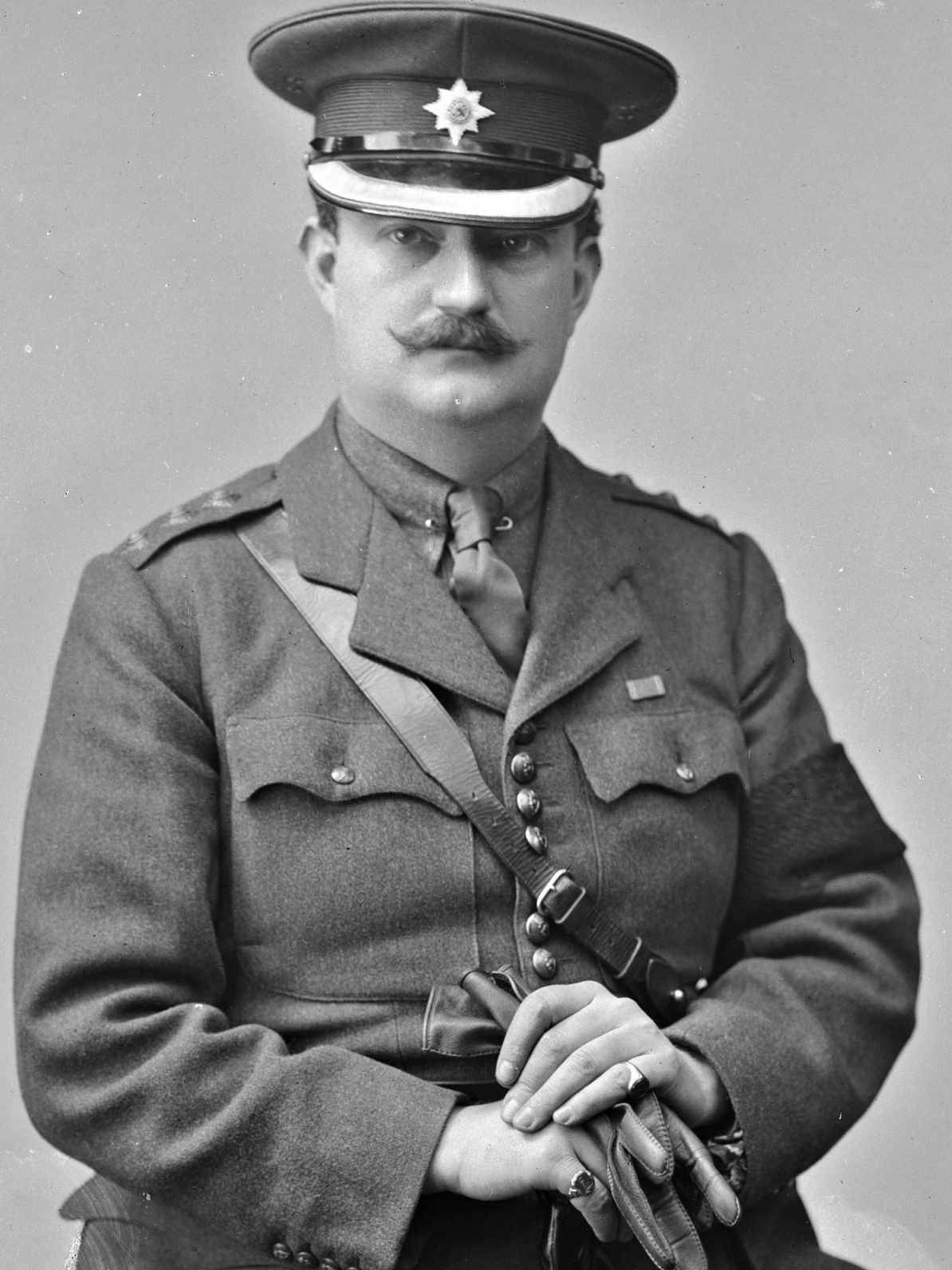
- Redmond, c. 1918

Teachta Dála
- In office August 1923 – 17 April 1932
- Constituency: Waterford

Member of Parliament
- In office March 1918 – December 1922
- Constituency: Waterford City
- In office December 1910 – March 1918
- Constituency: East Tyrone

Personal details
- Born: 16 October 1886 London, England
- Died: 17 April 1932 (aged 45) Waterford, Ireland
- Party: Cumann na nGaedheal (1931–1932)
- Other political affiliations: National League Party (1926–1931); Irish Parliamentary Party (1910–1918)
- Spouse: Bridget Redmond (m. 1930–1932)
- Parent: John Redmond (father)
- Education: Trinity College Dublin

Military service
- Allegiance: United Kingdom
- Branch/service: British Army
- Rank: Captain
- Unit: Royal Dublin Fusiliers; Irish Guards
- Conflicts: World War I: Western Front
- Awards: Distinguished Service Order

William Archer Redmond DSO (16 October 1886 – 17 April 1932) was an Irish nationalist politician. He served as an MP in the House of Commons of the United Kingdom of Great Britain and Ireland as well as a Teachta Dála (TD) of Dáil Éireann. He was one of the few people to have served in both the House of Commons and in the Oireachtas.

During World War I, he served in the British Army as an officer with an Irish regiment on the Western Front. He was the son of John Redmond, the leader of the Irish Parliamentary Party from 1900 to 1918, and was one of a dynasty of Liberal and Irish Nationalist politicians who are commemorated in Redmond Square in Wexford town.

== Early and personal life ==
William Archer Redmond was born on 16 October 1886 in London, the only son of three children of John Redmond and his wife Johanna. Redmond was educated at Clongowes Wood College and Trinity College Dublin. On 18 November 1930, he married Bridget Mallick of the Curragh, County Kildare. They had no children.

== Parliamentary and military career ==
He was elected as MP for Tyrone East at the December 1910 general election and supported the passing of the 1914 Home Rule Act.

When his father called for support for the British and Allied war effort in World War I, Redmond enlisted and was commissioned in the Royal Dublin Fusiliers, and later served in Irish Guards, rising to the rank of captain. He served on the Western Front for the duration of the war, and was awarded the Distinguished Service Order. His fellow MP and uncle Willie Redmond, John's brother, also joined up and was killed in 1917. Three other Irish Nationalist MPs also served, J. L. Esmonde, Stephen Gwynn, D. D. Sheehan and former MP Tom Kettle.

When his father died in March 1918, William Archer Redmond resigned his Tyrone seat and successfully defended his father's seat of Waterford at the subsequent by-election. Famously he campaigned in his army uniform and wearing a black armband. His victory ended a run of Sinn Féin victories at by-elections and gave a big, albeit temporary, boost to the morale of supporters of the Irish Parliamentary Party. He did not take part in the First Dáil.

In the general election of December 1918, he was re-elected for Waterford City, becoming one of only two Irish Parliamentary Party MPs outside the six counties of Northern Ireland, and he spoke out strongly in the House of Commons against British military policy in Ireland during the Irish War of Independence.

In the British House of Commons he spoke out against the Government of Ireland Bill which resulted in the partition of Ireland:

"I was pleased to fight shoulder to shoulder, on the Somme and elsewhere, with my fellow-countrymen from the North of Ireland. We fraternised, and we thought that when we came home we would not bicker again, but that we would be happy in Ireland, with a Parliament for our own native country. We did not want two Irelands at the Front; it was one Ireland, whether we, came from the North or from the South...I feel in common with thousands of my countrymen in Ireland, that I and they have been cheated out of the fruits of our victory. We placed our trust in you and you have betrayed us."

== Dáil career ==
Following independence, Redmond was elected as an Independent Nationalist deputy in the 4th Dáil for Waterford at the 1923 general election. In 1926, he co-founded the National League Party, appealing to former supporters of the Irish Parliamentary Party, ex-servicemen, and others, including Unionists, alienated by the policies of the Cumann na nGaedheal government. The new party won eight seats at the June 1927 general election.

However Redmond alarmed his supporters by supporting a motion of no confidence placed by Labour Party and Fianna Fáil to bring down the Cumann na nGaedheal government, and replace it with a minority Labour Party–National League administration supported from outside by Fianna Fáil. The attempt failed and in the ensuing general election in September 1927, the party won only two seats, including Redmond. The following year the National League was dissolved and in 1931 Redmond joined Cumann na nGaedheal. He died suddenly in April 1932. No by-election was held for the vacancy. His wife Bridget Redmond was elected as a Cumann na nGaedheal TD for Waterford at the 1933 general election.

== See also ==
- Families in the Oireachtas

Parliament of the United Kingdom
Preceded by Tom Kettle	Member of Parliament for East Tyrone; 1910–1918	Succeeded by Thomas Harbison
Preceded by John Redmond	Member of Parliament for Waterford City; 1918–1922	Constituency abolished

Dáil	Election	Deputy (Party)	Deputy (Party)	Deputy (Party)	Deputy (Party)
4th	1923	Caitlín Brugha (Rep)	John Butler (Lab)	Nicholas Wall (FP)	William Redmond (NL)
5th	1927 (Jun)	Caitlín Brugha (Rep)	Patrick Little (FF)	Vincent White (CnaG)	William Redmond (NL)
6th	1927 (Sep)	Seán Goulding (FF)	Patrick Little (FF)	Vincent White (CnaG)	William Redmond (NL)
7th	1932	Seán Goulding (FF)	Patrick Little (FF)	John Kiersey (CnaG)	William Redmond (CnaG)
8th	1933	Seán Goulding (FF)	Patrick Little (FF)	Nicholas Wall (NCP)	Bridget Redmond (CnaG)
9th	1937	Michael Morrissey (FF)	Patrick Little (FF)	Nicholas Wall (FG)	Bridget Redmond (FG)
10th	1938	Michael Morrissey (FF)	Patrick Little (FF)	William Broderick (FG)	Bridget Redmond (FG)
11th	1943	Michael Morrissey (FF)	Patrick Little (FF)	Denis Heskin (CnaT)	Bridget Redmond (FG)
12th	1944	Michael Morrissey (FF)	Patrick Little (FF)	Denis Heskin (CnaT)	Bridget Redmond (FG)
12th	1947 by-election	John Ormonde (FF)	Patrick Little (FF)	Denis Heskin (CnaT)	Bridget Redmond (FG)
13th	1948	John Ormonde (FF)	Patrick Little (FF)	Thomas Kyne (Lab)	Bridget Redmond (FG)
14th	1951	John Ormonde (FF)	Patrick Little (FF)	Thomas Kyne (Lab)	Bridget Redmond (FG)
14th	1952 by-election	John Ormonde (FF)	Patrick Little (FF)	Thomas Kyne (Lab)	William Kenneally (FF)
15th	1954	John Ormonde (FF)	Thaddeus Lynch (FG)	Thomas Kyne (Lab)	William Kenneally (FF)
16th	1957	John Ormonde (FF)	Thaddeus Lynch (FG)	Thomas Kyne (Lab)	William Kenneally (FF)
17th	1961	John Ormonde (FF)	Thaddeus Lynch (FG)	Thomas Kyne (Lab)	3 seats 1961–1977
18th	1965	Billy Kenneally (FF)	Thaddeus Lynch (FG)	Thomas Kyne (Lab)	3 seats 1961–1977
18th	1966 by-election	Billy Kenneally (FF)	Fad Browne (FF)	Thomas Kyne (Lab)	3 seats 1961–1977
19th	1969	Billy Kenneally (FF)	Fad Browne (FF)	Edward Collins (FG)	3 seats 1961–1977
20th	1973	Billy Kenneally (FF)	Thomas Kyne (Lab)	Edward Collins (FG)	3 seats 1961–1977
21st	1977	Billy Kenneally (FF)	Jackie Fahey (FF)	Edward Collins (FG)	Austin Deasy (FG)
22nd	1981	Billy Kenneally (FF)	Jackie Fahey (FF)	Edward Collins (FG)	Austin Deasy (FG)
23rd	1982 (Feb)	Paddy Gallagher (SF–WP)	Jackie Fahey (FF)	Edward Collins (FG)	Austin Deasy (FG)
24th	1982 (Nov)	Donal Ormonde (FF)	Jackie Fahey (FF)	Edward Collins (FG)	Austin Deasy (FG)
25th	1987	Martin Cullen (PDs)	Jackie Fahey (FF)	Brian Swift (FF)	Austin Deasy (FG)
26th	1989	Brian O'Shea (Lab)	Jackie Fahey (FF)	Brendan Kenneally (FF)	Austin Deasy (FG)
27th	1992	Brian O'Shea (Lab)	Martin Cullen (PDs)	Brendan Kenneally (FF)	Austin Deasy (FG)
28th	1997	Brian O'Shea (Lab)	Martin Cullen (FF)	Brendan Kenneally (FF)	Austin Deasy (FG)
29th	2002	Brian O'Shea (Lab)	Martin Cullen (FF)	Ollie Wilkinson (FF)	John Deasy (FG)
30th	2007	Brian O'Shea (Lab)	Martin Cullen (FF)	Brendan Kenneally (FF)	John Deasy (FG)
31st	2011	Ciara Conway (Lab)	John Halligan (Ind.)	Paudie Coffey (FG)	John Deasy (FG)
32nd	2016	David Cullinane (SF)	John Halligan (Ind.)	Mary Butler (FF)	John Deasy (FG)
33rd	2020	David Cullinane (SF)	Marc Ó Cathasaigh (GP)	Mary Butler (FF)	Matt Shanahan (Ind.)
34th	2024	David Cullinane (SF)	Conor D. McGuinness (SF)	Mary Butler (FF)	John Cummins (FG)
