= George Plunkett =

George Plunkett may refer to:

- George Noble Plunkett (1851–1948), Irish nationalist
- George Oliver Plunkett (1894–1944), son of George Noble Plunkett, Irish Republican and leading member of the IRA
- George Plunkett (photographer) (1913–2006), English photographer
- George Thomas Plunkett (died 1827), Irish Roman Catholic clergyman

== See also ==
- George W. Plunkitt (1842–1924), New York state senator
