= East Tyrone (UK Parliament constituency) =

Parliamentary constituency in the United Kingdom, 1885–1918

- Former county constituency for the House of Commons

1885–1918
- Seats: 1
- Created from: County Tyrone
- Replaced by: North East Tyrone

East Tyrone was a UK parliamentary constituency in Ireland. It returned one Member of Parliament (MP) to the British House of Commons from 1885 to 1918.

Prior to the 1885 United Kingdom general election the area was part of the County Tyrone constituency. From the dissolution of Parliament in 1918 East Tyrone became part of the new North East Tyrone constituency.

== Boundaries ==
This constituency comprised the eastern part of County Tyrone, consisting of the barony of Dungannon Upper and that part of the barony of Dungannon Middle not contained within the constituency of South Tyrone.

== Members of Parliament ==
Election	Member	Party
1885	William James Reynolds	Nationalist
1890	William James Reynolds	Anti-Parnellite Nationalist
1895	Patrick Doogan	Anti-Parnellite Nationalist
1900	Patrick Doogan	Nationalist
1906 (b)	Tom Kettle	Nationalist
Dec 1910	William Redmond	Nationalist
1918 (b)	Thomas Harbison	Nationalist
1918 Dec	Constituency abolished (see North East Tyrone)	

== Elections ==
=== Elections in the 1880s ===
General election 3 December 1885: Tyrone East
Party	Candidate	Votes	%	±%
Irish Parliamentary	William James Reynolds	3,919	53.8	
Irish Conservative	James Meliss Stuart	3,361	46.2	
Majority		558	7.6	
Turnout		7,280	91.6	
Registered electors		7,496		
Irish Parliamentary win (new seat)				

General election 15 July 1886: Tyrone East
Party	Candidate	Votes	%	±%
Irish Parliamentary	William James Reynolds	3,843	53.2	−0.6
Liberal Unionist	Matthew George Megaw	3,375	46.8	+0.6
Majority		468	6.4	−1.2
Turnout		7,218	90.8	−0.8
Registered electors		7,946		
Irish Parliamentary hold		Swing	−0.6	

=== Elections in the 1890s ===
General election 11 July 1892: Tyrone East
Party	Candidate	Votes	%	±%
Irish National Federation	William James Reynolds	3,430	51.6	−1.6
Irish Unionist	Thomas Lorimer Corbett	3,222	48.4	+1.6
Majority		208	3.2	−3.2
Turnout		6,652	92.5	+1.7
Registered electors		7,188		
Irish National Federation gain from Irish Parliamentary		Swing	−1.6	

General election 22 July 1895: Tyrone East
Party	Candidate	Votes	%	±%
Irish National Federation	Patrick Doogan	3,413	51.1	−0.5
Irish Unionist	Thomas Lorimer Corbett	3,261	48.9	+0.5
Majority		152	2.2	−1.0
Turnout		6,674	93.8	+1.3
Registered electors		7,113		
Irish National Federation hold		Swing	−0.5	

=== Elections in the 1900s ===
General election 10 October 1900: Tyrone East
Party	Candidate	Votes	%	±%
Irish Parliamentary	Patrick Doogan	3,126	50.6	−0.5
Irish Unionist	J. Lincoln Sandwith	3,050	49.4	+0.5
Majority		76	1.2	−1.0
Turnout		61,76	91.4	−2.4
Registered electors		6,760		
Irish Parliamentary hold		Swing	−0.5	

General election 23 January 1906: Tyrone East
Party	Candidate	Votes	%	±%
Irish Parliamentary	Patrick Doogan	3,053	50.3	−0.3
Irish Unionist	William John MacGeagh MacCaw	3,022	49.7	+0.3
Majority		31	0.6	−0.6
Turnout		6,075	96.4	+5.0
Registered electors		6,299		
Irish Parliamentary hold		Swing	−0.3	

By-election 25 July 1906: Tyrone East
Party	Candidate	Votes	%	±%
Irish Parliamentary	Tom Kettle	3,018	50.1	−0.2
Irish Unionist	William John MacGeagh MacCaw	3,000	49.9	+0.2
Majority		18	0.2	−0.4
Turnout		6,018	95.5	−0.9
Registered electors		6,299		
Irish Parliamentary hold		Swing	−0.2	

=== Elections in the 1910s ===
General election 28 January 1910: Tyrone East
Party	Candidate	Votes	%	±%
Irish Parliamentary	Tom Kettle	3,208	50.9	+0.6
Irish Unionist	Armar Deyrolles Saunderson	3,096	49.1	−0.6
Majority		112	1.8	+1.2
Turnout		6,304	96.6	+0.2
Registered electors		6,526		
Irish Parliamentary hold		Swing	+0.6	

General election 16 December 1910: Tyrone East
Party	Candidate	Votes	%	±%
Irish Parliamentary	William Redmond	3,108	51.2	+0.3
Irish Unionist	David Reid	2,968	48.8	−0.3
Majority		140	2.4	+0.6
Turnout		6,076	93.1	−3.5
Registered electors		6,526		
Irish Parliamentary hold		Swing	+0.3	

By-election 3 April 1918: Tyrone East
Party	Candidate	Votes	%	±%
Irish Parliamentary	Thomas Harbison	1,802	59.6	+8.4
Sinn Féin	Seán Milroy	1,222	40.4	New
Majority		580	19.2	+16.8
Turnout		3,024	43.9	−49.2
Registered electors		6,885		
Irish Parliamentary hold		Swing		
