= 1972 New Year Honours =

British royal recognitions

The New Year Honours 1972 were appointments in many of the Commonwealth realms of Queen Elizabeth II to various orders and honours to reward and highlight good works by citizens of those countries. They were announced in supplements to the London Gazette of 31 December 1971 to celebrate the year passed and mark the beginning of 1972.

At this time honours for Australians were awarded both in the United Kingdom honours, on the advice of the premiers of Australian states, and also in a separate Australia honours list.

The recipients of honours are displayed here as they were styled before their new honour, and arranged by honour, with classes (Knight, Knight Grand Cross, etc.) and then divisions (Military, Civil, etc.) as appropriate.

== United Kingdom and Commonwealth ==
=== Privy Counsellor ===
- Robert Alexander Lindsay, Lord Balniel, MP, Minister of State for Defence.
- The Honourable Sir Harry Talbot Gibbs, KBE, a Justice of the High Court of Australia.
- Maurice Victor Macmillan, MP, Chief Secretary, HM Treasury.

=== Knight Bachelor ===
- Herbert Ashworth, Chairman, Housing Corporation
- William Denholm Barnetson, Chairman, Reuters
- Geoffrey Hirst Bateman, lately Surgeon, Ear, Nose and Throat Department, St. Thomas' Hospital, London
- Cecil Walter Hardy Beaton, CBE, Designer and Photographer.
- Bernard Richard Braine, MP. For political and public services.
- John Howie Flint Brotherston, Chief Medical Officer, Scottish Home and Health Department.
- Colin Douglas Buchanan, CBE, Professor of Transport, Imperial College of Science and Technology, University of London.
- Alan Louis Charles Bullock, Vice-Chancellor, University of Oxford.
- Thomas Arthur Collier Burgess, Vice-Chancellor, County Palatine of Lancaster.
- Alderman Joseph Foster Cairns, Lord Mayor of Belfast.
- Einar Athelstan Gordon Caroe, CBE, Chairman, Trustee Savings Banks Association.
- Kenneth Sholl Ferrand Corley, Chairman and Managing Director, Joseph Lucas (Industries) Ltd. For services to Export.
- Esmond Otho Durlacher. For political and public services in London.
- Bertram Clough Williams-Ellis, CBE, MC. For services to the preservation of the environment and to architecture.
- Cyril Rupert English, Director-General, City and Guilds of London Institute.
- William John English, MBE, Chairman, South Western Regional Hospital Board.
- John Dudley Harmer, OBE. For political and public services in the South-East.
- Fred Hoyle, FRS, Plumian Professor of Astronomy and Experimental Philosophy, University of Cambridge.
- William Hardie Kininmonth, President, Royal Scottish Academy.
- Gilbert James Morley Longden, MBE, MP. For political and public services.
- Alexander Forbes McDonald, Chairman, Distillers' Co. Ltd. For services to Export.
- John Andrew McKay, CBE, QPM, HM Chief Inspector of Constabulary for England and Wales.
- Peter Gordon Masefield, lately Chairman, British Airports Authority.
- William Gerard Morris, Recorder of Manchester and Judge of the Crown Court of Manchester.
- George Porter, FRS, Fullerian Professor of Chemistry. Director, Royal Institution of Great Britain.
- Edward Stanley Gotch Robinson, CBE, FBA. For services to Numismatics and the Ashmolean Museum.
- Martin Roth, Professor of Psychological Medicine, University of Newcastle upon Tyne.
- Archibald Edward Russell, CBE. Lately Director, British Aircraft Corporation Ltd.
- Michael Sobell. For charitable services.
- Harold Macdonald Steward, Alderman, Liverpool City Council.
- Nigel Edward Strutt, TD, DL, Chairman, Agricultural Advisory Council.
- Peter Frank Dalrymple Tennant, CMG, OBE, Director-General, British National Export Council. For services to Export.
- Robert Hugh Willatt, Secretary-General, Arts Council of Great Britain.
- Hugh Walter Kingwell Wontner, CVO, lately Aldermanic Sheriff, City of London.

Diplomatic Service and Overseas List

- Milton Pentonville Allen, OBE, Acting Governor, St. Christopher-Nevis-Anguilla.
- The Honourable Sidney Samuel Gordon, CBE, JP. For public services in Hong Kong.
- The Honourable Kan Yuet-keung, CBE, JP. For public services in Hong Kong.
- Thomas Oates, CMG, OBE, Governor, St. Helena.
- The Honourable Mr. Justice James Wicks, Chief Justice of Kenya.

Australian States
State of New South Wales

- Emil Herbert Peter Abeles. For services to transport, charities and universities.
- The Honourable Mr. Justice James Kenneth Manning, QC. For services to the law.

State of Victoria

- The Honourable Vernon Howard Colville Christie, MP, Speaker of the Legislative Assembly.
- Thomas Meek Ramsay, CMG, of South Yarra. For public service and services to commerce.

State of Queensland

- The Honourable David Eric Nicholson, MLA, Speaker of the Legislative Assembly.
- Clive Wentworth Uhr, CBE, ChM, FCRA, of Brisbane. For services to medicine and the community.

=== Order of the Bath ===
==== Knight Grand Cross of the Order of the Bath (GCB) ====
Military Division

- Admiral Sir Horace Rochfort Law, KCB, OBE, DSC.
- General Sir John Mogg, KCB, CBE, DSO, ADC (General), (73153), late Infantry. Colonel Commandant, The Royal Green Jackets; Colonel Commandant, Army Air Corps.

==== Dame Commander of the Order of the Bath (DCB) ====
Civil Division

- Mildred Riddelsdell, CBE, Second Permanent Secretary, Department of Health and Social Security.

==== Knight Commander of the Order of the Bath (KCB) ====
Military Division

Royal Navy

- Vice Admiral Peter William Beckwith Ashmore, CB, MVO, DSC.
- Vice Admiral John Charles Young Roxburgh, CB, CBE, DSO, DSC.

Army

- Major-General Roland Christopher Gibbs, CBE, DSO, MC, (114083), late Infantry. Colonel Commandant, 2nd Battalion, The Royal Green Jackets.
- Lieutenant-General Frank Douglas King, CB, MBE, (138204), late Infantry.
- Lieutenant-General John Hugh Sherlock Read, OBE, (73055), late Corps of Royal Engineers.

Royal Air Force

- Air Marshal Anthony Wilkinson Heward, CB, OBE, DFC, AFC.
- Air Marshal Thomas Neville Stack, CB, CVO, CBE, AFC.

Civil Division

- James Duncan Jones, CB, Second Permanent Secretary, Department of the Environment.
- Alan Derrett Neale, CB, MBE, Second Permanent Secretary, HM Treasury.

==== Companion of the Order of the Bath (CB) ====
Military Division

Royal Navy

- Rear Admiral Colin Charles Harrison Dunlop, CBE.
- Rear Admiral Philip Roger Canning Hicham.
- Major General Patrick Richard Kay, MBE, Royal Marines.
- Instructor Rear Admiral Brinley John Morgan.
- Rear Admiral John Atrill Templeton-Cotill.

Army

- Major-General Patrick Fisher Claxton, OBE, (68519), late Royal Army Service Corps, now R.A.R.O.
- Major-General Ian Gordon Gill, OBE, MC, (79107), late Royal Armoured Corps.
- Major-General Derek George Levis, OBE, (70125), late Royal Army Medical Corps, now retired.
- Major-General Terence Douglas Herbert McMeekin, OBE, (77531), late Royal Regiment of Artillery.
- Major-General Harry Owen (137048), Army Legal Services, now R.A.R.O.

Royal Air Force

- Air Vice-Marshal Ivor Gordon Broom, CBE, DSO, DFC, AFC.
- Air Vice-Marshal Marcus Maxwell Gardham, CBE.
- Acting Air Vice-Marshal Arthur Griffiths, AFC.
- Air Commodore Thomas Malcolm Grahame Bury, OBE.
- Air Commandant Ann Smith McDonald, ARRC, QHNS, Princess Mary's Royal Air Force Nursing Service.

Civil Division

- Edward John Braybrook, Director-General of Supplies and Transport (Naval), Ministry of Defence.
- Arthur Caffin Brooke, Permanent Secretary, Ministry of Commerce for Northern Ireland.
- Peter Willoughby Carey, Deputy Secretary, Cabinet Office.
- William Henry Morton Clifford, CBE, Solicitor, Department of Health and Social Security.
- George Roy Denman, CMG, Deputy Secretary, Department of Trade and Industry.
- Hywel Wynn Evans, Permanent Secretary, Welsh Office.
- Ronald Petrie Fraser, Deputy Secretary, Ministry of Agriculture, Fisheries and Food. (Secretary designate, Scottish Home and Health Department.)
- James Arnot Hamilton, MBE, Deputy Secretary, Department of Trade and Industry.
- James Boag Howard, Assistant Under Secretary of State, Home Office.
- Dennis John Lyons, Director-General of Research, Department of the Environment.
- John Ringer Moss, Deputy Secretary, Ministry of Agriculture, Fisheries and Food.
- Robert Stanley Porter, OBE, Director-General of Economic Planning, Foreign and Commonwealth Office (Overseas Development Administration).
- Robert Press, CBE, Deputy Secretary, Cabinet Office.
- Rhys Price Probert, Deputy Controller of Aircraft (A), Procurement Executive, Ministry of Defence.
- Eric Hugh Alexander Stretton, Under Secretary, Department of the Environment.
- Colonel Kenneth David Treasure, CBE, TD, DL, lately Chairman, Wales and Monmouthshire Territorial Auxiliary and Volunteer Reserve Association.

=== Order of Saint Michael and Saint George ===
==== Knight Grand Cross of the Order of St Michael and St George (GCMG) ====
- Sir William Alan Nield, KCB, Permanent Secretary, Cabinet Office.

Diplomatic Service and Overseas List

- Sir Denis Arthur Greenhill, KCMG, OBE, Permanent Under-Secretary of State, Foreign & Commonwealth Office, and Head of Her Majesty's Diplomatic Service.
- The Honourable Sir Con Douglas Walter O'Neill, KCMG, Foreign & Commonwealth Office.
- The Right Honourable Arthur Christopher John Soames, CBE, Her Majesty's Ambassador, Paris.

Australian States

- The Honourable Sir Henry Edward Bolte, KCMG, MLA, Premier and Treasurer, State of Victoria.

==== Knight Commander of the Order of St Michael and St George (KCMG) ====
Diplomatic Service and Overseas List

- John Henry Keswick, CMG. For services to British interests in the Far East.
- Guy Elwin Millard, CMG, CVO, Her Majesty's Ambassador, Stockholm.
- The Honourable Peter Edward Ramsbotham, CMG, Her Majesty's Ambassador, Tehran.

Australian States

- The Honourable Robert William Askin, MLA, Premier and Treasurer, State of New South Wales.

==== Companion of the Order of St Michael and St George (CMG) ====
- Charles William Capstick, Senior Principal Agricultural Economist, Ministry of Agriculture, Fisheries and Food.
- Michael David Milroy Franklin, Under Secretary, Ministry of Agriculture, Fisheries and Food.
- Cyril Robert Parke Hamilton, Deputy Chairman, The Standard Bank Ltd.
- Michael Hugh Lawrence, Principal Clerk and Head of Overseas Office, House of Commons.
- Walter Patrick Shovelton, Under Secretary, Department of Trade and Industry.
- John Fell Slater, Assistant Secretary, HM Treasury.

Diplomatic Service and Overseas List

- Harry Godfrey Mitchell Bass, British High Commissioner, Maseru.
- Joseph Alfred Dobbs, OBE, TD, Minister, Her Majesty's Embassy, Moscow.
- Martin John Moynihan, MC, Her Majesty's Ambassador and Consul-General, Monrovia.
- Andrew Lancelot Pope, CVO, OBE, Counsellor, Her Majesty's Embassy, Bonn.
- Frank Charles Douglas Sargeant, lately British Deputy High Commissioner, Dacca.
- Ian McTaggart Sinclair, Foreign and Commonwealth Office.
- John Adam Thomson, Foreign and Commonwealth Office.
- Peter Alan Grant Westlake, MC, Minister, Her Majesty's Embassy, Tokyo.

Australian States
State of New South Wales

- Stanley Hains Lovell, ED, MS, FRACS. For services to surgery.

State of Victoria

- Professor James Adam Louis Matheson, MBE, Vice-Chancellor, Monash University.

State of Queensland

- Leslie Frank Diplock, MLA, of Scarborough. For public service.

State of South Australia

- The Honourable Berthold Herbert Teusner, JP, of Tanunda. For public and community service.

=== Royal Victorian Order ===
==== Knight Commander of the Royal Victorian Order (KCVO) ====
- James Cecil Hogg, CVO, FRCS, LRCP.
- Peter James Kerley, CVO, CBE, MD, FRCP.
- Rear-Admiral Alexander Henry Charles Gordon Lennox, CB, DSO.
- Major James Rennie Maudslay, CVO, MBE.
- Douglas Sinclair Miller, CBE.

==== Commander of the Royal Victorian Order (CVO) ====
- Esmond Butler.
- Henry Louis Carron Greig.
- Charles John Leslie Hibberd.
- Group Captain Basil Anthony Primavesi, Royal Air Force.
- Peter Henry Ogle-Skan, TD.

==== Member of the Royal Victorian Order (MVO) ====
At this time the two lowest classes of the Royal Victorian Order were "Member (fourth class)" and "Member (fifth class)", both with post-nominal letters MVO. "Member (fourth class)" was renamed "Lieutenant" (LVO) from the 1985 New Year Honours onwards.

Fourth Class

- Philip Hugh Halsey.
- Squadron Leader Richard Edward Johns, Royal Air Force.
- Commander John Michael Powell, Royal Navy.
- Michael Roger Ernest Ruffer, TD.
- Arthur Bartram Savage, OBE.
- Major George Raymond Seymour.
- David Stevenson, MVO.
- Roy Vincent Francis Turner, MBE, QPM.

Fifth Class

- Flight Lieutenant Arthur John Finucane, DFC, Royal Air Force (Retd.)
- John Patrick Kyle.
- Constance Jane Lugton.
- Eric Wingfield Morrell.
- Leonard Charles Munn.
- Flying Officer John Rae, Royal Air Force.
- Pamela Selby-Smyth.
- Irene Ellen Try.

==== Medal of the Royal Victorian Order (RVM) ====
In Silver

- Lionel Allibone.
- TO958326 Warrant Officer Jesse Baker, BEM, Royal Air Force.
- Chief Petty Officer Steward Douglas Gordon Cleary, P 817054.
- Victor William Eynon.
- V1923391 Chief Technician Sydney Arthur Frost, Royal Air Force.
- Leading Seaman Ronald William Gander, P/JX 898712.
- U1812019 Flight Sergeant Alexander Henry Graham, Royal Air Force.
- Frederick Owen Hildreth.
- Leslie Donald Hillier.
- Alfred John Holloway.
- Police Constable John McVitty, Metropolitan Police.
- William Stanley Parker.
- Gertrude Annie Sweeney.

=== Order of the British Empire ===
==== Knight Grand Cross of the Order of the British Empire (GBE) ====
Civil Division

- Sir Henry Frank Harding Jones, KBE, Chairman, Gas Council.

==== Dame Commander of the Order of the British Empire (DBE) ====
Civil Division

- Cicely Courtneidge, CBE, (Cicely Esmeralda Hulbert). For services to the Theatre.
- Muriel Diana Reader Harris. For services to Education and the Church.
- Freya Stark, CBE, (Freya Madeline Perowne), Writer and traveller.
- Susan Armour Walker, CBE. For political services.

==== Knight Commander of the Order of the British Empire (KBE) ====
Military Division

- Air Marshal Ernest Shaw Sidey, CB, QHS, MD, ChB, Royal Air Force.

Civil Division

- Professor Alan Lloyd Hodgkin, President, Royal Society of London.
- Sir Henry Cecil Johnson, CBE, lately Chairman, British Railways Board.
- John Thomson, TD, Chairman, Barclays

Diplomatic Service and Overseas List

- Alderman Lawrence Emmett McDermott, Lord Mayor of Sydney.
- Sir Henry James Tucker, CBE, JP, MCP, lately Government Leader, Bermuda.

==== Commander of the Order of the British Empire (CBE) ====
Military Division

Royal Navy

- Rear Admiral John Edward Dyer-Smith.
- Captain Robert Allister Gilchrist, ADC.
- The Reverend John Carrick Goudie, QHC, Principal Chaplain, Church of Scotland and Free Churches.
- Christina Thompson, RRC, QHNS, Matron-in-Chief, Queen Alexandra's Royal Naval Nursing Service.

Army

- Colonel Jocelyn St. John Baxter (118400), late Corps of Royal Engineers.
- Colonel Peter Bogue Clarke (418074), late Royal Army Educational Corps.
- Brigadier Eric MacLachlan Mackay, MBE, (210907), late Corps of Royal Engineers.
- Colonel Alastair Douglas Mackenzie (65532), late Infantry.
- Major-General (Acting) Logan Scott-Bowden, DSO, OBE, MC, (95182), late Corps of Royal Engineers.
- Brigadier Philip John Newling Ward, OBE, (293484), late Foot Guards.
- The Reverend David Hutchison Whiteford, Chaplain to the Forces, First Class (305651), Royal Army Chaplains' Department, now R.A.R.O.

Royal Air Force

- Air Commodore Eric Burchmore, OBE.
- Air Commodore Ivan James de la Plain.
- Air Commodore William John Stacey.
- Acting Air Commodore Mansel Clifford Morris Vaughan, MBE.
- Group Captain William Michael Dixon, DSO, DFC, AFC, ADC. For services with the Royal Malaysian Air Force.
- Group Captain Kenneth Kingshott, DFC.
- Group Captain Basil Charles Player.
- Group Captain Fred Rothwell, DFC, TD. For services with the Kenya Air Force.

Civil Division

- William Leslie Abernethy, Treasurer, Greater London Council.
- Professor Thomas Anderson, lately Henry Mechan Professor of Public Health, University of Glasgow.
- Robert George Armstrong, MC, TD, Controller, National Savings Bank, Department for National Savings.
- George Leslie Ayres, Senior Principal Inspector of Taxes, Board of Inland Revenue.
- William Babington, QFSM, Chief Officer, Kent Fire Brigade.
- Desmond Anderson Harvie Banks. For political services.
- Albert William Cleeve Barr, Managing Director, National Building Agency.
- Percy Harold Bates. For political services in Essex.
- John William Beith, lately Chairman, Massey Ferguson (United Kingdom) Ltd. For services to Export.
- Charles Blyth, BEM. For services to Sailing.
- Arthur Bond, Chairman, Yorkshire Electricity Board.
- John Bostock, Managing Director, Sperry Gyroscope Division, Sperry Rand Ltd.
- Ann Parker Bowles, Chief Commissioner of the Girl Guides Association.
- Robert Lewis Fullarton Boyd, FRS, Professor of Physics, University of London.
- George Vernon Kennedy Burton, MBE, Deputy Chairman, Export Council for Europe. For services to Export.
- Andrew Bowman Cameron, Director of Education, County of Dunbarton.
- Archibald Duncan Campbell, Professor of Applied Economics, University of Dundee.
- John Alan Clough, MC, Chairman, Wool Textile Delegation.
- Martin Du Pre Cooper, Music Critic, Daily Telegraph.
- Edred John Henry Corner, Professor of Tropical Botany, University of Cambridge.
- Michael Colin Cowdrey. For services to Cricket.
- John Cecil Crawley, MBE, Chief Assistant to Director-General, BBC.
- Montague Davenport, OBE, Foreign & Commonwealth Office.
- Lieutenant-Colonel Leonard Elliot Dickson, MC, TD, DL, lately Chairman, Lowlands of Scotland Territorial Auxiliary and Volunteer Reserve Association.
- Geoffrey Percival Dollimore, Managing Director, Hunting Engineering Ltd. For services to Export.
- John Basil Edwards. For public services in Worcester.
- Ronald Witham Elliott, County Medical Officer of Health for the West Riding of Yorkshire.
- Frederick Arthur Boucher Fawssett, OBE, Deputy Director, Ministry of Defence.
- Albert Fogg, Director of Research and Development, British Leyland Motor Corporation Ltd. For services to Export.
- Philip Frank Foreman, Managing Director, Short Brothers & Harland Ltd., Belfast. For services to Export.
- Phyllis Muriel Friend, Chief Nursing Officer, The London Hospital.
- Jack Frye, Chairman, Iron and Steel Consumers' Council.
- Sidney Edward Goodall, President, International Electrotechnical Commission.
- Sylvia Mary Ethel Goodfellow, lately Assistant Secretary, Department of Education and Science.
- Robert Fraser Gordon, Director, Houghton Poultry Research Station, Huntingdon.
- John Gough, Secretary and Director of Administration, Confederation of British Industry.
- Ronald Harry Graveson, QC, Professor of Law, King's College, University of London.
- Arthur Grey, Alderman, Newcastle upon Tyne City Council.
- Ronald Edward Groves, Vice-Chairman, International Timber Corporation Ltd.
- Sidney Beetham Hainsworth, Chairman, J. H. Fenner & Co. (Holdings) Ltd., Hull. For services to Export.
- Geoffrey Henry Heywood, Chairman, Skelmersdale New Town Development Corporation.
- Alan John Wills Hill, Chairman and Managing Director, Heinemann Educational Books International Ltd.
- Herbert Prenzel Hobbs, Member of the Lands Tribunal.
- George Robert Hodnett, lately Chairman, Newcastle upon Tyne United Hospitals.
- Michael Murray Hordern, Actor.
- Alexander Edward Howard, Headmaster, Wandsworth School, London.
- Ernest George Hucker, lately Senior Director of Central Personnel, Central Headquarters, Post Office.
- Dennis Edmund Hutchinson, MBE, DL, Alderman, Northamptonshire County Council.
- Joseph Douglas Hutchison, MC, TD. For services to the Milling Industry.
- Arthur Robert Jenkins, Chairman and Managing Director, Robert Jenkins (Holdings) Ltd., Rotherham.
- Frank William Jessup, Secretary, Delegacy for Extra-Mural Studies, University of Oxford.
- Jean Margaret Swinburne-Johnson. For political services in the Midlands.
- John Clement Jones, Editorial Director, Midland News Association Ltd.
- The Very Reverend Alfred Jowett. For services to Community Relations.
- Wilfred Fricker Joyce, Deputy Chief Inspector, Board of Customs and Excise.
- Gustav Kahnweiler. For services to the Tate Gallery.
- Charles Henry Grierson Kinahan, Chairman, Ulster '71 Exhibition Committee.
- Arthur Koestler, Author.
- Donald Dunrod Lindsay, lately Headmaster, Malvern College.
- Commander James Barrett Livingston, DSC, President, Glass Manufacturers Federation.
- Arthur Douglas Lloyds, Secretary, St. Dunstan's.
- Robert Alfred Sydney Lomax, Chairman, Foundry Industry Training Committee.
- Henry Carpenter Longhurst. For services to Golf.
- William James Maitland Longmore, Executive Director, Lloyds and BOLSA International Bank Ltd. For services to Export.
- Frank Berti Lydall, MBE. For political and public services in Yorkshire.
- John Keith Lynn, Chairman, Northern Ireland Milk Marketing Board.
- George Kenneth McKee, Senior Orthopaedic Surgeon, East Anglian Regional Hospital Board.
- Estelle Louise Irving Martland. For political services in Lancashire.
- David Parry Martin Michael, Headmaster, Newport High School, Monmouthshire.
- Rupert Munton, Technical Director, The British & Commonwealth Shipping Co. Ltd.
- Fuller Mansfield Osborn, lately Chairman of the Council, Building Societies Association.
- David Elystan Owen, Director, Manchester Museum.
- John Elliott George Palmer, Consultant, Rendel, Palmer and Tritton, Consulting and Designing Engineers.
- Henry Gordon Parker, MM, Chairman, Felixstowe Dock & Railway Co..
- Jack Noel Peacock, lately Secretary, British Dental Association.
- William Wood Watson Peat. For services to agriculture in Scotland.
- Jack Armitage Peel, DL, General Secretary, National Union of Dyers, Bleachers and Textile Workers.
- Stuart Piggott, Abercromby Professor of Prehistoric Archaeology, University of Edinburgh.
- Thomas Donald Farrell Powell, Director-General, The Textile Council.
- Rachel Emily Purvis, OBE, Chairman for Scotland, Women's Royal Voluntary Service.
- Bridget Louise Riley, Artist.
- George Arthur Rooley, Senior Partner, Donald Smith, Seymour & Rooley (Consulting Engineers).
- Walter Scott. For political services in Scotland.
- Peter Faulkner Shepheard. For services to Architecture.
- Eleanor Lilian Keith Sinclair, Assistant Secretary, Department of Trade and Industry.
- Alan Leslie Strachan, lately Chief Estate Officer, Department of the Environment.
- David Kinnear Thomson, MBE, TD, Lord Provost of Perth.
- Professor John Ronald Reuel Tolkien. For services to English Literature.
- George Twist, QPM, Chief Constable, Bristol Constabulary.
- Isidore Aaron Walton. For services to the community.
- David Ward, Singer.
- Edmund Fisher Ward, Partner, Gollins, Melvin, Ward & Partners, Architects.
- David James Waterston, MBE, Paediatric Surgeon, Hospital for Sick Children, Great Ormond Street, London.
- Frank Daniel Sidney Waterton, Assistant Secretary, Department of Health and Social Security.
- John Parker Watson, TD, President, Law Society of Scotland.
- Walter Winterbottom, OBE, Director, Sports Council.
- Robert Eric Wood, Director, City of Leicester Polytechnic.
- James Brewis Woodeson, OBE, Chairman, Clarke Chapman-John Thompson Ltd., Gateshead.
- Peter Maurice Wright, Senior Technical Adviser, Ministry of Defence.
- Colonel John Francis Williams-Wynne, DSO. For services to agriculture in Wales.
- Alderman Edith Anne Yates, Chairman, Nottinghamshire County Council.

Diplomatic Service and Overseas List

- The Honourable David Richard Watson Alexander, MBE, JP, Director, Urban Services Department, Hong Kong.
- Douglas Maurice Bell. For services to British interests in Belgium.
- John William Blake, lately Vice-Chancellor, University of Botswana, Lesotho and Swaziland.
- William Henry Bramble, JP, lately Chief Minister and Minister of Finance, Montserrat.
- John Alwyn Cayton, OBE, lately British Council Representative in Canada.
- John Hugh Rathbone Davies, MBE, Civil Service Adviser to the West Indies Associated States.
- Lieutenant-Colonel Donald Norman Albert Fairweather, OBE, ED, Chairman, Public Service Commission, British Honduras.
- Wallace Bruce Haughan. For services to British interests in Canada.
- Robert Marshall Hetherington, DFC, lately Commissioner of Labour, Hong Kong.
- Ian Lockie Michael, Vice-Chancellor, University of Malawi.
- Richard Hugh Mills-Owens, lately Puisne Judge, Hong Kong.
- Ian Cameron Rose, TD, Government Secretary, St. Helena.
- The Honourable George Tippet Rowe, JP, Director of Social Welfare, Hong Kong.
- Francis Harold Scarfe, OBE. For services to British cultural interests in France.
- John Henry Sharpe. For public services in Bermuda.
- Charles Thurstan Shaw, Professor and Head of Department of Archaeology, University of Ibadan, Nigeria.
- The Right Reverend Kenneth John Fraser Skelton, lately Bishop of Matabeleland.
- Charles Payne Sutcliffe, OBE, QPM, JP, Commissioner of Police, Hong Kong.
- Norman Noel Tett, OBE, British Council Representative in Spain.

Australian States
State of New South Wales

- James Keith Campbell. For services to commerce.
- Nola Laird Dekyvere, MBE. For services to the community, especially to the blind.

State of Victoria

- James Campbell Johnston, of Kooyong. For services to commerce and industry.
- Una Patricia Mackinnon, of Kooyong. For services to the community.

State of Queensland

- Keith Douglas Morris, of Brisbane. For services to the building industry and to youth.

State of South Australia

- Charles Roy Sims Colyer, of Springfield. For services to the Electricity Trust of South Australia and to sport.
- Leonard Vivian Hunkin, JP, of Westbourne Park. For services to banking.

State of Tasmania

- Rodney Wilton Henry, of Boyer. For services to the community.

==== Officer of the Order of the British Empire (OBE) ====
Military Division

Royal Navy

- Commander Arthur James Carrington. Formerly serving with the Royal Navy Training Team, Nigeria.
- Commander Trevor Charles Deacon. On loan service with the Royal Malaysian Navy.
- Commander John de Beaufort-Suchlick.
- Acting Commander Philip Robert Fluck.
- Commander Joseph David John Hawksley.
- Commander Alan Gilbert Kennedy.
- Commander Peter Richard David Kimm.
- Surgeon Commander Francis Michael Kinsman, MRCS, LRCP.
- Instructor Commander Ronald Hugh McIntosh.
- Commander Gerald Maxwell Braddon Selous, VRD, Royal Naval Reserve.
- Commander Kenneth Norman Simmonds.
- Commander George William Keeton Whittaker.

Army

- Lieutenant-Colonel Richard Frederick Alston (190265), Royal Army Pay Corps.
- Lieutenant-Colonel The Right Honourable Robert Guy Eardley, Baron Alvingham (368405), Coldstream Guards.
- Lieutenant-Colonel Andrew Neville Brearley-Smith (400069), Corps of Royal Engineers.
- Colonel (acting) Peter Irvine Chiswell, MBE, (414821), The Parachute Regiment.
- Lieutenant-Colonel John Charles Court (249908), Corps of Royal Engineers.
- Lieutenant-Colonel Ralph Gwyn Davies, MC, (193370), Corps of Royal Military Police.
- Lieutenant-Colonel Robert Keith Denniston, MC, (176941), Queen's Own Highlanders (Seaforth and Camerons).
- Lieutenant-Colonel Norman James Dunkley (320038), Intelligence Corps.
- Lieutenant-Colonel David Houston (407888), The Queen's Lancashire Regiment.
- Colonel (acting) Geoffrey Charles Howgego (289100), The Royal Anglian Regiment.
- Lieutenant-Colonel Maurice Frank Leonard (268188), Corps of Royal Military Police.
- Lieutenant-Colonel Peter Allan MacFarlane Macgillivray (390702), Royal Corps of Signals.
- Lieutenant-Colonel Alexander Fergus Mackain-Bremner (403398), The Royal Anglian Regiment.
- Lieutenant-Colonel (Acting) Arthur Thomas Markie (374650), Army Cadet Force.
- Lieutenant-Colonel Roger Courtenay Neath (356063), 6th Queen Elizabeth's Own Gurkha Rifles.
- Lieutenant-Colonel Gerald David John Robert Russell (393275), The Royal Irish Rangers (27th (Inniskilling) 83rd and 87th).
- Lieutenant-Colonel Peter William George Seabrook (393281), Royal Regiment of Artillery.
- Lieutenant-Colonel Anthony George Truscott Shave, MBE, (346429), Corps of Royal Engineers.
- Lieutenant-Colonel Joseph Raymond Smith (400707), Royal Army Educational Corps.
- Lieutenant-Colonel Robert Louis Spurrell (303296), The Royal Regiment of Wales (Territorial and Army Volunteer Reserve).

Royal Air Force

- Acting Group Captain John George Donald, MB, ChB.
- Wing Commander Kenneth Warwick Charles Bindloss (39058).
- Wing Commander George Arthur Chesworth, DFC, (3115507).
- Wing Commander Henry Vernon Craig (572268).
- Wing Commander Daniel Cledlyn Davies (128083).
- Wing Commander Francis Ernest Earnshaw (110855).
- Wing Commander Leonard Hague (157854).
- Wing Commander William Edward Hamilton, DFC, (150356).
- Wing Commander Bryce Gilmore Meharg, AFC, (39941).
- Wing Commander Brian Dynsdale Moore (180536).
- Wing Commander David Jackson Penman, DSO, DFC (40343).
- Wing Commander Reginald James Spiers (607056).
- Acting Wing Commander Robert Michael Robson (2590352).

Overseas Award

- Wing Commander Ronald Percy Smith, MBE, (18093056), Royal Hong Kong Auxiliary Air Force.

Civil Division

- Eric Arthur Abbott, QPM, Deputy Chief Constable, West Mercia Constabulary.
- John Ackroyd, City Engineer and Surveyor, Plymouth.
- David Eric Adams, Senior Principal Scientific Officer, Science Research Council.
- Elizabeth Rosemary Allott, Foreign and Commonwealth Office.
- Leonard Amey, Agricultural Correspondent, The Times.
- Robert Black Anderson, lately Area Manager, Dundee, North of Scotland Hydro-Electric Board.
- Frank Alexander Arrowsmith, H M. Inspector, Department of Education and Science.
- Alan Ewart Walter Austen, Technical Director, C.A.V. Ltd.
- George William Backhouse, lately Conservator, East England, Forestry Commission.
- Noel Grimshaw Bailey, Honorary County Secretary, West Riding of Yorkshire, Soldiers', Sailors' and Airmen's Families Association.
- Charles Vivian Baker, lately General Manager and Secretary, Sutton Dwellings Trust.
- Frederick Thomas Baker, Director, City of Lincoln Libraries, Museum and Gallery.
- Thomas Riseborough Barber, Higher Collector, Northern Ireland, Board of Customs and Excise.
- Alderman Arthur James Bettridge. For services to local government and the elderly in Cheltenham.
- William Judson Binns, Managing Director, Walmsley (Bury) Group Ltd. For services to Export.
- James Blades, Percussion Player.
- Andrew Charles Blair, General Medical Practitioner, Kilsyth, Glasgow.
- Kenneth David Bomford, Chief of Applied Physics, Atomic Weapons Research Establishment, Aldermaston, United Kingdom Atomic Energy Authority.
- Ronald William Boss, Director, The Life Offices' Association.
- Harry Simister Bottoms, Chief Designer (Engineering), Lucas Gas Turbine Equipment Ltd. For services to Export.
- Sylvia Mary Bovill, lately Chairman, Forest Group Hospital Management Committee.
- William Powell Bowman, Managing Director (International Division), United Biscuits Ltd., Isleworth For services to Export.
- Teresa Mary Violet, Lady Briscoe, President, Buckinghamshire Branch, British Red Cross Society.
- Eli Joseph Broughton, Alderman, Worcestershire County Council.
- Charles William Bungey, Senior Quantity Surveyor, Department of the Environment.
- Reginald John Ackroyd Armstrong Burford, Chief Auditor, Exchequer and Audit Department.
- Mary Eugenie Burke, latey{C;arify} Deputy Director, Commonwealth Institute.
- Lyonel Peckover Burrill, MBE. For local government and social services in Denbighshire.
- Harold Burrows. For services to the Scout Association in North East Lancashire.
- Denis Johnston Cadzow. For services to cattle breeding in Scotland.
- Ralph Henry Campin, Deputy Chief Engineer, Metropolitan Police Office.
- Frederick John Capron, QFSM, Chief Officer, Warwickshire Fire Brigade.
- William James Carter, Chairman, Management Side, Committee C., Pharmaceutical Whitley Council.
- Ivan Reginald Clout, General Medical Practitioner, Crawley.
- Freda Mary Cocks, Alderman, Birmingham City Council and Chairman, Housing Committee.
- Richard Alfred Frank Collins. For services to The Royal Air Forces Association.
- Sydney Arthur George Cook, Director of Architecture, London Borough of Camden.
- Brian Aldhous Copas, Divisional Engineer (Primary Roads), Department of Planning and Transportation, Greater London Council.
- Geoffrey Percy Copping, Staff Engineer, Mechanisation and Buildings Department, Post Office.
- The Right Honourable Fidelity, Countess of Cranbrook, Chairman, Aldeburgh Festival.
- Alderman Patrick Crotty. For services to the community in Leeds.
- Alexander d'Agapeyeff, lately President, British Computer Society.
- George Howard Davies, TD. For political services in the West Country.
- Sydney John Dawes. For services as Captain, British Lions Rugby Team.
- John Dean, TD, Project Engineer, Motorway Construction, Cumberland.
- John Dimmick, Principal, Reading College of Technology.
- Robert Arthur Downs, County Surveyor, Gloucestershire.
- William John Hugh Dungey, Assistant Chief Architect, Department of Health and Social Security.
- Douglas Edward Dyas, lately Superintending Engineer, Department of the Environment.
- Alderman Arthur George Dye. For local government and social services in Cheltenham.
- John Eastment, Assistant Works Manager, Martin-Baker (Engineering) Ltd. For services to Export.
- Grant Donaldson Eddie, Senior Representative, British Army of the Rhine, Young Men's Christian Association.
- Logan Andrew Edgar, Clerk to the Justices, Hastings County Borough, Bexhill, Battle and Rye Divisions.
- Ronald Albert Ellefsen, Director, Czech Refugee Trust Fund.
- Martin Julius Esslin, Head of Drama, Radio, British Broadcasting Corporation.
- Mark Fairclough, TD, Chairman, Harry Fairclough Ltd., Building and Civil Engineering Contractors, Warrington.
- Irene Florence Fairey, Senior Principal, Natural Environment Research Council.
- Lucy Faithfull, Director, Social Services Department, City of Oxford.
- William James Farrant, lately President, National Federation of Builders' and Plumbers' Merchants.
- William Ewart John Farvis, Professor of Electrical Engineering, University of Edinburgh.
- Samuel Rutherford Fee, General Medical Practitioner, Tunstall, Stoke-on-Trent.
- Charles Henry Fookes, Chairman, United Terminal Sugar Market Association.
- Colonel Lewis McPherson Fordyce, TD, DL, Chairman, Orpington and Sidcup Local Employment Committee.
- William Fox, lately Secretary, International Tin Council.
- Rodney Ivor Fraser, Publicity Director, British National Export Council. For services to Export.
- Ronald Levitt Fredenburgh, lately Director, Current Affairs Unit, English-Speaking Union of the Commonwealth.
- Winnie Frost, Chief Nursing Officer, Bedfordshire.
- The Reverend Robert David Eric Gallagher. For services to the community in Belfast.
- John Henry Gerrard, MC, Deputy Assistant Commissioner, Metropolitan Police.
- George Paxton Glass, Head of Government Relations and Regional Trade Relations, Middle East, Shell Petroleum Co. Ltd.
- Professor Royston Miles Goode, Member, Committee of Inquiry on Consumer Credit.
- John Edward Gower, MC, Senior Legal Assistant, Registry of Friendly Societies.
- Catherine Dymond Grace, Principal, St. Christopher's School, Bristol.
- Edward William Greensmith, Chairman, British Standards Institution.
- Bertha Grieveson, Chairman, Board of Visitors, HM Borstal, Rochester.
- Shirley Kathleen Laurie Guiton, Principal, Foreign and Commonwealth Office (Overseas Development Administration).
- David Glanville Gwyn, Deputy Chairman, Merseyside and North Wales Electricity Board.
- John Halas, Director, Halas & Batchelor Animation Ltd.
- Ernest Jack Hammersley, Principal Scientific Officer, Ministry of Defence.
- Alderman James Hand. For political and public services in Lancashire.
- John Harding, Senior Principal Scientific Officer, Ministry of Defence.
- John Herbert Hargreaves, Deputy Controller of Programmes, Southern Television Ltd.
- James Leslie Harrington, lately Deputy Chairman, Shipping and International Services Board, British Railways.
- Arthur Graham Harrison, DSC, Town Clerk, Wallasey County Borough Council.
- Ernest Thomas Harrison, Chairman, East Berkshire Industrial Savings Council.
- John Allen Harrison, Director, Educational Foundation for Visual Aids.
- George William Johnson Hawbrook, General Medical Practitioner, Leeds.
- Kenneth Hedges, Headmaster, Ellesmere Port County Grammar School for Boys.
- Richard Henry Hemmings, Managing Director, York Division, Borg-Warner Ltd. For services to Export.
- John Taylor Henderson, Headmaster, Rossie School, Montrose.
- Percival Charles Hewett, Official Receiver, Department of Trade and Industry.
- Dorothy Barbara Peter-Hoblyn. For political services in Cornwall.
- Charles Henry Hodder, States Financial Secretary, Guernsey.
- Robert Hope, County Agricultural Officer (Grade I), Cheshire, Ministry of Agriculture, Fisheries and Food.
- Philip George Heyworth Hopkins, lately Warden and Principal, Fircroft College, Birmingham.
- Harry Horwood. For services to the community in Watford.
- The Reverend William Ernest Leonard Houlden. For services to the Royal British Legion in Somerset.
- Robert Leonard Howlett, Secretary, Public Road Transport Association.
- James Arthur Hufton, Managing Director, Stone Wallwork Ltd. For services to Export.
- Archibald Hunter, MBE, General Manager, Liverpool Trustee Savings Bank.
- Sidney George Jobson, Principal, Department of Trade and Industry.
- Harold Keeling, Operations Officer, Grade I, Department of Trade and Industry.
- James Kelly, Secretary and Legal Adviser, Livingston Development Corporation.
- John Ernest Agar King, Head of Management Appointments and Development, British Steel Corporation.
- John Wallace King, Chief Information Officer (A), Department for National Savings.
- Samuel Kinghan. For political services in Belfast.
- Harold Kirkman, lately Deputy Director, Mullard Co. Ltd., Blackburn. For services to Export.
- Norman George Leaf, Director, International Operations, Thorn Lighting Ltd. For services to Export.
- William Liddell, Leader, Commissioning Team for the Russian Polyester Plant, Imperial Chemical Industries Fibres Ltd. For services to Export.
- George Edward Limb, Chairman, Nottingham County Agricultural Executive Committee.
- Robert John Herbert Lloyd, TD, DL, Secretary, National Museum of Wales.
- Henry McCay, Adviser on labour and industrial relations, Du Pont Co., Maydown, Londonderry.
- Alexander Duncan McCowen, Actor.
- Michael Joseph McCoy, lately Chief Operating Manager (Buses), London Transport Executive.
- John McKee. For political services in the North East.
- John Murdo Macmillan, Headmaster, Back Secondary School, Isle of Lewis.
- Marcus Norman Medrington, lately Chief Engineer, Lee Conservancy Catchment Board.
- Julien Englebert Mersey, Foreign and Commonwealth Office.
- Harold Miller, Chief Physicist, Sheffield Regional Hospital Board.
- John Gordon Craig Milligan, Director-General of Industrial Relations, National Coal Board.
- Geoffrey Allen Moore, Headmaster, Brooklands County Junior Mixed School, Nottingham.
- George William Morley, lately Chief Project Engineer for the Erskine Bridge.
- Edwin Harrison Morris, Chairman, Cambridgeshire and Isle of Ely Agricultural Executive Committee.
- Margaret Elizabeth Morrison, Member, Northern Ireland Council for Nurses and Midwives.
- Percy John Mortlock. For services to the National Chamber of Trade.
- Lieutenant-Colonel Edward George Bartholomew Moss, DL, Secretary, Territorial Auxiliary and Volunteer Reserve Association for Western Wessex.
- Joseph David Bernard Mountrose. For services to Anglo-Liberian relations.
- Charles Mudge, Chairman, Bristol Savings Committee.
- Herbert Keen Olphin, lately Headmaster, Blackwell County Secondary School, Harrow.
- John Henry Orr, Chief Constable, Lothians and Peebles Constabulary.
- David Maddock Parry, Chairman, Rhondda Valley National Insurance Local Tribunal.
- Major Francis Doming Parry, TD, lately Traffic Commissioner, Western Traffic Area.
- Leslie Norman Pascoe, Chief Civil Hydrographic Officer, Ministry of Defence.
- Harry Payne. Alderman, Cambridgeshire and the Isle of Ely County Council.
- Marguerita Marion Pedder, Principal, Civil Service Department.
- Leslie Nathan Phillips, Senior Principal Scientific Officer, Royal Aircraft Establishment, Farnborough.
- Lionel Charles Phipps, Secretary, North East Metropolitan Regional Hospital Board.
- Alfred Pollard, lately Assistant Director, Long Ashton Research Station, Bristol.
- Winifred Eva Prentice, Matron, Stracathro Hospital, Angus.
- Daphne Jane Preston. For political services in Yorkshire.
- Reginald Arnold Pye. For political services in the South East.
- Thomas Quail, Deputy Secretary and Rural Officer, Community Council of Lancashire.
- Cyril Parker Rawlinson, MBE, Deputy Chief Inspector (Training), Department of Employment.
- Donald Reid, Head, Industrial Operations Division, Scottish Council (Development and Industry). For services to Export.
- Guy Richards. For political and public services in East Anglia.
- George Low Riddell, Director of Research, Paper and Board, Printing and Packaging Industries Research Association.
- Rowland Stanley Roberson, MBE, Chairman, South West Lancashire Productivity Association.
- Joan Rafferty Robins, Home Service Adviser, The Gas Council.
- Captain Charles Pratt Robinson, lately Master, MV Cumberland, New Zealand Shipping Company Ltd.
- Stanford Robinson. For services to Music.
- Lionel Rosen. For services to the community in Kingston-upon-Hull.
- Lady Catherine Charlotte Rous. For services to the Ex-Services War Disabled Help Department, Joint Committee of the Order of St. John and British Red Cross Society, Suffolk Branch.
- Jimmy Savile. For personal services to hospitals and to charities.
- Patricia Mary Maxwell-Scott. For services to tourism in The Borders of Scotland.
- Bernard Drake Scriven, lately Contracts Manager, Hawker Siddeley Aviation Ltd. For services to Export.
- Alexander Martin Sellar, lately Senior Depute Town Clerk, Edinburgh.
- Peter Philip Shervington, Deputy Principal Probation Officer, Inner London Probation and After-Care Service.
- Flora Eileen Skellern, Superintendent of Nursing, Bethlem Royal and Maudsley Hospitals.
- Basil Crandles Smith Slater, General Medical Practitioner, Harrow.
- Douglas William Cumming Smith, TD. For services as Manager, British Lions Rugby Team.
- Norman Charles Strother-Smith, ERD, Director, Fire Protection Association.
- John Richard Soans, Chairman, Northamptonshire Association of Boys' Clubs.
- John Leslie Spooner. For services to the community in Hull and District.
- Clifford John Stairmand, lately Section Manager, Small Particles Development Section, Imperial Chemical Industries Ltd., Billingham.
- William Fletcher Stanley, Chairman, Leicester County Agricultural Executive Committee.
- Roger Edward Stenning, lately Director, National Federation of Building Trades Employers, London Region.
- Alexander Miller Stephen, Principal, Scottish Home and Health Department.
- Gilbert Lawrence Stephenson, lately Secretary, Voluntary Service Overseas.
- Athole John Spalding Stewart, DFC, Commandant, Scottish Area, Royal Observer Corps.
- John Young Stewart. For services to Motor Racing.
- John Michael Stratton, Chairman, Wiltshire Agricultural Executive Committee.
- Duncan Cameron-Swan. For services to the Catering Industry.
- William Henry Swinburne, Head of Music Department, North-East Essex Technical College.
- Clifford Edward Tate, Director of Research, Plessey Telecommunications Co. Ltd.
- Major Wynne Simpson Thomas, DL, Clerk to Carmarthenshire County Council.
- Trevor Herbert Thornton, Managing Director, Northern Ireland Carriers Ltd.
- Philip Towle, Senior Legal Assistant, Board of Inland Revenue.
- Richard Morris Trim, Technical Director, Cossor Electronics Ltd. For services to Export.
- William Rhodes Tuson, lately Chief Education Officer, Preston County Borough.
- Stanley Harold Tyson, formerly Chairman, Council of the Merseyside and North West Safety Centre.
- Basil Sydney John Unite. For services to the Flower Industry.
- Madeleine Freda Vaughan. For political and public services in Wales.
- James Donald Waddell, Town Clerk, City of Lancaster.
- Dennis Walsh, lately Chairman, Association of British Travel Agents.
- James Irvine Watson, Secretary of the British Council.
- Kenneth Charles Bonython Webster, Dental Adviser, Inner London Education Authority.
- Edgar Haddon Whitaker, Chairman and Managing Director, J. Whitaker & Sons Ltd.
- Marion Baillie Howie Whyte. For services to Mental Health.
- Major Idris Morgan-Williams, Headquarters Staff Officer, St John Ambulance Association and Brigade.
- Elsie Clare Nimmo Winnicott, lately Director of Child Care Studies, Department of Health and Social Security.
- Stanley Woollock, AFC, Principal, Red Bank Approved School.
- Michael John Wright, Technical Adviser, Ministry of Defence.
- Stuart Wyatt, BEM, President, Badminton Association of England.
- Frances Amelia Yates. For services to Art History.

Diplomatic Service and Overseas List

- Charles Eric Albury, Superintendent, Prison Department, Bahama Islands.
- Dorothy Isabel Allan, MBE. For services to education in Uganda.
- Michael Holiday Arnold, Director, Cotton Research Station, Namulonge, Uganda.
- David William Barkham, MB, ChB, Senior Consultant Physician, Mulago Hospital, Uganda.
- Richard Guy Barrett. For services to British commercial interests in Sabah.
- Charles John Lyell Bennett, MC. For services to British interests in Cyprus.
- Ernest Alfred Blackwell. For services to the British community in Brussels.
- John Robert Gow Bleasby. For services to British commercial interests in Canada.
- The Honourable Herbert John Charles Browne, JP. For public services in Hong Kong.
- William Donald Victor Burton, LMSSA, MRCGP. For services to British interests and to the British community in Assam.
- Hilton Cheong-Leen, JP. For public services in Hong Kong.
- The Honourable Oswald Victor Cheung, QC, JP. For public services in Hong Kong.
- James Roderick Clube, lately First Secretary, HM Embassy, Baghdad.
- Peter Albert Coates. For services to Anglo-Brunei relations.
- Martin Stuart Rossett Cozens, First Secretary, British Deputy High Commission, Dacca.
- James Alfred Davidson, First Secretary and Head of Chancery, HM Embassy, Phnom Penh.
- George Frederick de Sausmarez, lately British Council Representative, Venezuela.
- Daunton John Dodd, lately Manager, Western Caribbean, British Overseas Airways Corporation.
- Phyllis Esme Donaldson, MBE. For services to education in The Netherlands.
- Captain Gerald Douglas, lately Superintendent of Marine, British Solomon Islands Protectorate.
- Dorothy Minnie Ellicott, MBE, JP. For services to the community in Gibraltar.
- Geoffrey Ellis, lately Adviser to the Minister for Power and Communications, Kenya.
- Leslie Percival Fernandez, lately HM Consul, Algeciras.
- Alistair Edgar Gillespie, MRCVS, Chief Veterinary Officer, Swaziland.
- Thomas Bernard Glover. For services to British interests in Argentina.
- Herbert Spencer Hanley, Comptroller of Customs, St. Christopher-Nevis-Anguilla.
- The Reverend Canon Raymond John Harries, lately Provost of All Saints' Cathedral, Nairobi.
- James Leith Henderson. For services to British commercial interests in Malawi.
- Charles Radbourn Hewer, First Secretary (Cultural Attaché), HM Embassy, Budapest.
- Raymond Arthur Hodges, Chief Inspector of Education, North Western State, Nigeria.
- Roland Chadwick Horrocks. For services to British commercial interests in Ecuador.
- The Reverend John Derek Jones, Minister, Trinity Congregational Church, Gaborone.
- John Reginald Kale. For services to British interests in Japan.
- Margaret Agnes Keay, Professor, Crop Production, Ahmadu Bello University, Nigeria.
- William Reginald Keight, MBE, British Council Representative, Libya.
- King Sing-yui, JP, Professor of Electrical Engineering, University of Hong Kong.
- Lau Chan-kwok, JP. For services to transport and the community in Hong Kong.
- Margaret Denise Eileen Lester, MBE. For services to education in Portugal.
- Edward Robert Lloyd, British Council Representative, Morocco.
- Rogerio Hyndman Lobo, JP. For services to the community in Hong Kong.
- Frank Stephen James Long, Accountant General, Kano State, Nigeria.
- Philip Laurence Lorraine. For services to British interests in Sweden.
- Ian Mackinson, lately Principal, National Institute of Public Administration, Zambia.
- John William Macnab. For services to British commercial interests in Aden.
- Captain Alexander Meston Milne, Head of School of Nautical Studies, Singapore Polytechnic.
- Henry Niblock, HM Consul-General, Strasbourg.
- Anthony Parker, Exchange Controller, Bermuda.
- Mervyn Walthew Pritchard, lately Chief Technical Adviser, UNESCO Project, University of Nairobi.
- Richard Blake Sutherland Purdy, Under-Secretary, Development Division, Office of the President, Malawi.
- Lincoln Abraham Radix, MB, BCh. For public services in Grenada.
- John Henry Reiss, Deputy British Government Representative, Antigua.
- Norman Rostellan Roberts. For public services in Bermuda.
- Ian Cameron Robinson, MBE, lately Headmaster, Kings College, Budo, Uganda.
- Leslie Raymond Horace Rowdon, First Secretary (Information), British High Commission, Nairobi.
- Frances Marion Lina Sheffield, lately Principal Scientific Officer, Plant Quarantine Station, East African Agriculture and Forestry Research Organisation, Maguga, Kenya.
- Keith Owen Shipley, lately Assistant Secretary, Establishment Division, Government of Zambia.
- Anthony Rowland Guy Standing. For services to British interests in Kuwait.
- Ian Thomas Steven, HM Consul-designate, Palermo.
- Brian Suart. For services to telecommunications in Hong Kong.
- Captain Robert Ashby Todd, MBE, Pilot Superintendent, Port of Singapore Authority.
- Derek Alton Walcott. For services to literature and drama in St. Lucia.
- Laurence Edmond Webb, HM Deputy Consul-General, Los Angeles.
- Icen Alexander Wharton, JP. For public services in St. Christopher-Nevis-Anguilla.
- George Henry Winterburn, TD. For services to British interests in Greece.
- Paul Renoden Wycherley, Head of Botany Division, Rubber Research Institute, Malaysia.

Australian States
State of New South Wales

- Moses Michael Eisner. For services to the community.
- Francis Ernest Helmore. For services to dentistry.
- Alexander Skeffington Johnson, MS, FRACS. For services to medicine.
- Laurance Keith Mason. For services to ex-servicemen.
- George Thomas Donald Moore. For services to sport.
- Kenneth Gregory Ryan. For services to industry.
- Sydney George Webb, QC. For services to cricket.

State of Victoria

- Councillor Norman Gabriel William Anderson, of West Brunswick. For services to scouting and the community.
- John Wilfred Carr, of Newtown. For services to the community.
- Reginald Robert Etherington, of Mildura. For services to the community and to the arts.
- Barbara Macgregor Guest, of Toorak. For services to charity.
- Philippa May Hallenstein, of Oakleigh. For services to the community and to women's organisations.
- William Alan Marshal, of Eltham. Author. For services to physically disabled people.
- Councillor William John Stephenson, of Sale. For services to the community.

State of Queensland

- Helen Mary Keays, of Brisbane. For services to the community and to women's organisations.
- Tanu Nona, of Badu Island, Torres Strait. For services to the people of Torres Strait.
- Cecil Garton Pearce, of Southport. For services to education.
- Gladys Vera Redman, of Kingaroy. For services to youth.
- Percy John Skinner, of Brisbane. For services to the Royal National Agricultural and Industrial Association and other Show Society activities.

State of South Australia

- Charles Edward Blaskett, JP, of Toorak Gardens. For services to the community and especially to mentally disabled people.
- Gustav Hines, JP, of Springfield. For services to the Jewish community.
- George Hartley Manuell, JP, of Felixstowe. For services to the motoring trade and the community.
- Councillor Eldred Henry Verco Riggs, JP, of Gawler. For services to local government and the community.

State of Tasmania

- William Alan Hurle, Town Clerk, Hobart.
- Thomas Gray Johnston, of Launceston. For services to the community.

==== Member of the Order of the British Empire (MBE) ====
Military Division

Royal Navy

- Fleet Chief Petty Officer Writer Thomas McDonald Barr, D/MX 876849.
- Lieutenant Commander Terence Gerard Butler.
- Engineer Lieutenant (AE) Geoffrey John Carter.
- Captain Christopher John Rushall Goode, Royal Marines.
- Lieutenant Commander William Grange Harding, VRD, Royal Naval Reserve.
- Engineer Lieutenant Commander (AL) Cecil Graham Hooker, BEM.
- Lieutenant Commander Douglas Victor Allan Pearce, DSM.
- Supply Lieutenant Commander (OCA) Leslie Albert Shipp.
- Lieutenant Commander Charles Fred Peter Simpson.
- Engineer Lieutenant Commander (AE) Alec William Spence.

Army

- Captain Timothy Ash (483842), General List.
- Major David John Atkinson (433287), Royal Regiment of Artillery.
- Major John David Beaumont Bailey (71878), The Queen's Regiment, now retired.
- Captain (Quartermaster) Cecil Herbert Botwright (474113), The Royal Regiment of Fusiliers.
- Major Frederick Arthur Bushell (92993) Royal Corps of Transport, now retired.
- Major John Jeffrey Caiger (445813), The Staffordshire Regiment (The Prince of Wales's).
- Captain Charles Callaghan (447694), Corps of Royal Engineers, Territorial and Army Volunteer Reserve.
- Major (Quartermaster) Douglas George Chambers (261380), Corps of Royal Engineers.
- Major John Joseph Geoffrey Cox (426859), The Parachute Regiment.
- Captain Robin Extence Creighton (486577), General List.
- Major William Stanley Crook (430276), The Queen's Lancashire Regiment.
- Major Richard Hugh Dunn, TD, (436883), The Queen's Own Warwickshire and Worcestershire Yeomanry Territorial and Army Volunteer Reserve.
- 19080409 Warrant Officer Class I John Henry Ellis, The Royal Regiment of Wales.
- Major (Quartermaster) Ronald Henry Esler (472030), The Queen's Regiment.
- Major James Duncan Ewing (443435), Corps of Royal Engineers.
- Captain (Quartermaster) James Forsyth (478940), Scots Guards.
- Major (Quartermaster) John Albert Hall (471827), The Royal Hussars (Prince of Wales's Own).
- Major Stanley Clark Hamilton (219230), Royal Army Pay Corps.
- Major John Anthony Hare (437077), The Light Infantry.
- Major Geoffrey David Inkin (440038), The Royal Welch Fusiliers.
- Captain Peter Robert Lee (474343), Corps of Royal Military Police.
- Captain (Quartermaster) Robert Messer (478539), Royal Army Ordnance Corps.
- The Reverend James Monaghan, TD, Chaplain to the Forces Third Class (457030), Royal Army Chaplains' Department, Territorial and Army Volunteer Reserve.
- 22548031 Warrant Officer Class I Simeon Thomas Nelson, Royal Corps of Signals.
- Major (Q.G.O.) Partapsing Gurung, MVO, (434972), 2nd King Edward VIIs Own Gurkha Rifles (The Sirmoor Rifles).
- Major (E.M.A.E.) Reginald Leon Pearce (451616), Corps of Royal Electrical and Mechanical Engineers.
- 22570412 Warrant Officer Class II Stuart John Henry Pogue, Army Catering Corps.
- 22548999 Warrant Officer Class I William Philip Pringle, The Royal Regiment of Fusiliers.
- 22034044 Warrant Officer Class II James Pryde, The Royal Scots Dragoon Guards (Carabiniers and Greys).
- Major Richard Henry Robinson (443738), The Royal Anglian Regiment.
- Captain (Acting) James Frederick Peter Rogers (381675), Army Cadet Force.
- 22296193 Warrant Officer Class II Norman Salter, Royal Corps of Signals, now discharged.
- Captain Derek Raven Samuel, TD, (467306), Royal Army Medical Corps, Territorial and Army Volunteer Reserve.
- 4206506 Warrant Officer Class I Clifford Dennis Slater, The Royal Welch Fusiliers.
- Captain (Acting) Leslie Frederick Spiers (381754), Army Cadet Force.
- Major Patrick Francis Stafford (411724), Corps of Royal Electrical and Mechanical Engineers.
- Major (Quartermaster) Charles Storey (468669), The Parachute Regiment.
- 2623750 Warrant Officer Class I Tom Taylor, Grenadier Guards.
- Lieutenant-Colonel (acting) Gerald Clifford Walker (376746), Royal Pioneer Corps.
- 22807656 Warrant Officer Class II Terence Wood, Royal Army Ordnance Corps.

Royal Air Force

- Acting Wing Commander David Brill Williams (3076654), RAF Volunteer Reserve (Training Branch).
- Squadron Leader Gordon Acklam (4077136).
- Squadron Leader David Andrew, AFC, (55668).
- Squadron Leader Alan Newham Dawson, BEM, (574497).
- Squadron Leader Franciszek Florczak (500045).
- Squadron Leader Peter Forman (573851).
- Squadron Leader Ronald Houghton (179525).
- Squadron Leader John Jones (160776).
- Squadron Leader Robert Alfred James Jones (585803).
- Squadron Leader Brian Charles Knight (2487709).
- Squadron Leader Gordon Harry Edward Mitchell (5039711).
- Squadron Leader Richard Michael Slade (577781).
- Squadron Leader Murdo Alexander Sutherland (4084111).
- Squadron Leader Robert Richard Taylor (3507914).
- Squadron Leader Kenneth Charles Henry Whiley (200930).
- Flight Lieutenant Stephen Guy Dru Drury (4335016). For services with the Royal Malaysian Air Force.
- Flight Lieutenant Arthur Raymond Gill (58242).
- Flight Lieutenant William Howard Gordon, DFC, (128951).
- Flight Lieutenant Geoffrey James Lockwood (137395).
- Flight Lieutenant Dennis George Osment (4153612).
- Flight Lieutenant James Eric Stuart (2566132).
- Flight Lieutenant George Charles Watson, BEM, (3025072).
- Warrant Officer Spencer William John Endacott (T2200719).
- Warrant Officer Douglas Norman Gale (KO645856).
- Warrant Officer William John James Hambly, BEM, (T0575589). For services with the Royal Malaysian Air Force.
- Warrant Officer Patrick Anthony Jeffers (D2227774).
- Warrant Officer Frank Lee (FO546620).
- Warrant Officer Frederick Albert Mildinhall (N0614351).
- Warrant Officer Alan Grant Parsons (JO749370).
- Warrant Officer Gilbert White (C1675146).
- Master Signaller Michael Brian Dane (S3515713).

Civil Division

- William Abbott. For services to local government and the community in South Westmorland.
- Raymond Allinson. For political services in the Midlands.
- Ivor Allison, Senior Draughtsman, Ministry of Defence.
- Alice Alston, Councillor, Burnley Rural District Council.
- Sydney Anderson, Warning Officer, York Group, United Kingdom Warning and Monitoring Organisation.
- Maurice Armstrong, Chief Officer, Tynemouth Fire Brigade.
- Henry Ashley, Chairman, Patients' Aid Association, Wolverhampton.
- Edna Doreen Ayris, Senior Nursing Officer, Operating Department, United Leeds Hospitals.
- Wilfred Joseph Baker, lately Headmaster, St. James County Primary Boys' School, Kings Lynn.
- Asme Barker, lately Head, Remedial Department, Airedale High School, Castleford.
- Gilbert William Barns. Senior Executive Officer, Metropolitan Police Office.
- Hilda Edith Protheroe-Beynon. For political services in Wales.
- Joseph Harold Binks, Northern Ireland Area Secretary, Clerical and Administrative Workers Union.
- James Arthur Birnie, General Medical Practitioner, Aberdeen.
- George Thomas Bishop, Senior Spares Provisioning Officer, Filton Division, British Aircraft Corporation Ltd.
- Dorothy Patricia Black, Grade 3 Officer, Department of Employment.
- Francis Geoffrey Blackler, Technical Manager, Electron Optical Devices Division, Mullard Ltd.
- Dick Felix Bond, Higher Executive Officer, Ministry of Defence.
- Doris Elaine Bowdler, Secretary and Personal Assistant, London Transport Executive.
- John Alfred Bowers, Senior Process Supervisor, Reactor Engineering Laboratory, Risley, United Kingdom Atomic Energy Authority.
- Victor Billee Bray, County Careers Officer, Cheshire County Council.
- Arthur John Brewer, Grade 3 Officer, Department of Employment.
- James Fred Bright, lately Engineer in Charge, St. Charles Hospital, London W.10.
- James Wallace Britain, Senior Executive Officer, Department of Health and Social Security.
- Pamela Mary Brockwell, Conference Manager, British Standards Institution.
- Ivy May Bronnick, Domiciliary Midwife, London Borough of Barking.
- Leslie Littley Brooks, Senior Executive Officer, Foreign and Commonwealth Office (Overseas Development Administration).
- Robert Reekie Howden Brown, Member, British Productivity Council.
- The Reverend Ian James Langlands Browne, Administrator, Yorkshire Safety Centre for the Construction Industry.
- Maurice Browse, Shellfish skipper and processor, Devon.
- Kenneth Buchanan. For services to boxing.
- Clifford Luther Burman, Chairman, Norfolk and Lowestoft, Great Yarmouth and District War Pensions Committee.
- James Henry Burridge, Information and Records Assistant, Wages and Conditions Division, Confederation of British Industry.
- Horace Ayre Burton, Tees Pilot and Member of the Board, Tees Pilotage Authority.
- Sheila Mary Butler, Foreign and Commonwealth Office.
- Walter Frederick Calveley, Deputy Chief Constable, Dorset and Bournemouth Constabulary.
- Nesta Elisabeth Campbell, Press Librarian, Royal Institute of International Affairs.
- Thomas Wentworth Carson, lately Honorary Secretary, The Vintage Sports-Car Club.
- Eve Casket. For services to the Jewish Blind Society.
- Charles Frederick William Chilton, Producer, Light Entertainment, Radio, British Broadcasting Corporation.
- Johanna Clifford, lately Ward Sister, Nether Edge Hospital, Sheffield.
- Francis James Sanford Coffin, National Officer, National Union of Agricultural and Allied Workers.
- Freda Gertrude Cohen, Senior Executive Officer, Department of Health and Social Security.
- Gertrude Aldham Collins, Consultant and Tutor, Rural Music Schools Association.
- Isabel Maud Cooper, Head Mistress, Old Park School, Dudley.
- Mary Stephens Corbishley, Principal, Mill Hall School for the Deaf, Cuckfield.
- Ruth Margery Cotton, County Organiser, Cumberland, Women's Royal Voluntary Service.
- Kenneth Ewart Crago, General Manager, Portsmouth Trustee Savings Bank.
- William George Crawford, Chief Electrical Engineer, Weir Pumps Ltd., Alloa. For services to Export.
- Robert Ramsay Critchley, Chief Instructor, Air Service Training, Perth.
- Phyllis Marion Dammarell, Chairman, Croydon Rent Tribunal.
- Albert Edward Davies, Mechanical Workshops Engineer, Stocksbridge Works, British Steel Corporation.
- Mary Eluned Davies, Lecturer in Health Visiting, Welsh National School of Medicine.
- Noel Frank Davies, Town Clerk, Evesham Borough Council.
- Joan Irene Davis, Foreign and Commonwealth Office.
- Wilfred Joseph Dawson, lately Assistant Secretary (Establishments), North Eastern Electricity Board.
- Muriel Mary Deighton, Grade 3 Officer, Department of Employment.
- Ernest John Denbow, Grade 3 Officer, Department of Employment.
- Grace Anne Dexter. For services to agriculture and to the community in North West Leicestershire.
- Gwendoline Margaret Dickinson, lately School Administrative Officer, Chiswick School, Hounslow.
- Herbert Dixon, Senior Personnel Officer, G.E.C.-A.E.I. Telecoms Ltd.
- Marie Blanche Dixon, Chief Superintendent of Typists, Department of Education and Science.
- Abigail Lyttleton Dodds. For services to charity and music in Bristol.
- Arthur Edward Hammond Dowty. For political services in the Midlands.
- Margaret Agnes Buncombe, formerly Matron, Queen Victoria Hospital, East Grinstead.
- Olive Muriel Dyke, Vice-Chairman, New Southgate Hospital Management, Committee.
- Pauline Joan Edwards. For political and public services in Wessex.
- George Walter Elliott, Executive Officer, Paris, Ministry of Defence.
- Kathleen Mary Elphick, lately Higher Executive Officer, HM Procurator General and Treasury Solicitor.
- Brian Herbert Erhard, Judge's Clerk, Lord Chancellor's Department.
- Vivien Mary Ethridge, Controller, Martin House, Edinburgh.
- Elizabeth Gwyneth Evans, lately Chairman, Agergele Savings Committee.
- Margaret Elizabeth Evans. For services to the community in Aberystwyth.
- Rosalind Clara Evernden, lately Executive Officer, House of Lords.
- Robert Francis Fairweather, MC, Development Officer, St. George's Hospital, London.
- Jane Carolin Fawcett, Secretary, The Victorian Society.
- May Harriet Fender, Assistant County Director, City of Edinburgh Branch, British Red Cross Society.
- William Howard Fenn, Stores Supervisory Officer Grade I, Ministry of Defence.
- Anna Kathleen Ferris, Voluntary Welfare Worker, Warrenpoint, County Down.
- Helen Amy Finch, Home Help Organiser, Reading.
- Joan Frances Finnesey, Higher Executive Officer, Ministry of Defence.
- Roy Edward Flowerdew, Honorary Secretary, Blofield and Flegg Savings Committee, Norfolk.
- John Thomas Foley, Member, West Riding Gaskell Divisional Educational Executive.
- Leonard David Fowler, Deputy Regional Commissioner, National Savings Committee.
- Leslie George Francis, lately Secretary, The Warehousemen, Clerks and General Friendly Society.
- Charles Edward Fricker, Chief Training Officer (Dogs), Ministry of Defence.
- Henry Ralph Friend, lately Project Engineer, Balfour Beatty.
- Jack Francis Arnold Frost, Shipping and Sailing Correspondent.
- Philip Geoffrey Gadd. For political and public services in Wales.
- Mary Ethel Garrett, District Staff Officer (Cadets), Belfast, St. John Ambulance Brigade.
- Kenneth Edmonds Gateley, Director, The Southsea Shakespeare Actors.
- Francis Thomas George, Clerk and Chief Financial Officer, Teifiside Rural District Council and Newcastle Emlyn Urban District Council.
- Ernest Gilbert, Technical Manager, Marine Engineering, Vickers Ltd., Shipbuilding Group, Barrow-in-Fumess.
- Jack Hodgson Gilbertson, Technical Manager (Executive), Serck Heat Transfer, Birmingham.
- Herbert William Gillies, Senior Executive Officer, Home Office.
- Lucy Gilligan, Senior Personal Secretary, Department of Health and Social Security.
- Herbert Frederick Goode, Superintendent (Operations), British Transport Docks Board.
- Ernest Leslie Goodyear, National Savings District Member for North Shropshire.
- Gordon Rivington Goude, Director General, British Toy Manufacturers Association Ltd. For services to Export.
- Nancy Gertrude Madeleine Gow, Secretary of the Senate of the Inns of Court.
- Margaret Cuthbert Grant, Principal Teacher of English, Hillhead High School, Glasgow.
- Charles Frederick Richard Gray, lately Distribution Engineer (Supply), North Thames Gas Board.
- Denis Everett Gray. For services to the Magistracy.
- Elstan Edward Philip Gray, Higher Executive Officer, Department of Health and Social Security.
- Richard James Stephen Green, Founder and Leader, Thornhill Boys' Club, Southampton.
- Oscar Bertram Greeves, Chairman and Managing Director, Invacar Ltd., Benfleet, Essex.
- William Gresham, Warden, Murray House Community Centre and Youth Club, Newcastle upon Tyne.
- Margaret Mary Grieve, Principal Tutor, Cresswell Maternity Hospital, Dumfries.
- Henry John Griffin, a National Officer, National Graphical Association.
- Morgan Garbett Griffiths. For local government and social services in Caerphilly, Glamorgan.
- Daphne Hilda Grose, Chief Librarian, Consumers' Association.
- Patricia Mary Gwynne. Vice-Chairman, Shropshire Helping Hand Association.
- John William Hadley, Manager and Secretary, Police Mutual Assurance Society.
- Grace Muriel Thomson Halcrow. For political services in Shetland.
- Dora Hall, Secretary to the Chief Constable, Staffordshire County and Stoke-on-Trent Constabulary.
- Muriel Hardy, Sister in Charge, Ear, Nose and Throat Department, Nottingham General Hospital.
- James Andrew Hare, Product Manager, British Gypsum Ltd.
- Miriam Cameron Dunlop Hargrave, Woman Adviser, Galashiels Academy.
- Leslie George Harris. For services in connexion with the After-Care of offenders in Birmingham.
- Hannah Harry, Deputy Chairman, Wales Gas Consultative Council.
- Stephen Robert Hart, Chairman, Federation of Rabbit Clearance Societies.
- Thomas Hart, Superintendent, Cumberlow Lodge Senior Girls Remand Home and Classifying Centre.
- Marjorie Ada Harwood. For political services in the Midlands.
- Gerald Robert Hayes, lately Acting Chief Officer, National Freight Federation (N.F.C.) Ltd.
- Muriel Joan Hayes, Female Personnel Officer, Aviation Division, Smith's Industries Ltd., Cheltenham.
- Frances Heald, County Borough Organiser, Dewsbury, Women's Royal Voluntary Service.
- Sidney William Heath, President, South West Wales Trustee Savings Bank.
- Francis James Hebden, Higher Executive Officer, Commonwealth War Graves Commission.
- Maurice James Heddle. For services to the community in Southend-on-Sea.
- Robert Heslop, Higher Executive Officer, Department of Health and Social Security.
- George Henry Hicks, formerly Senior Measurer and Recorder, Ministry of Defence.
- Alfred Ernest Higginson, Divisional Engineer (Design and Development), Refuse Disposal Branch, Department of Public Health Engineering, Greater London Council.
- Ronald Hill. For services to athletics.
- Ho Kang Po, BEM, lately Executive Officer, Hong Kong, Ministry of Defence.
- Frederick William Hobby, General Manager, Royal Dundee Institution for the Blind.
- William Pearson Hodgson, Honorary Road Safety Officer, Whitehaven Borough Council.
- Harry Hoggard, Service Manager, Brown Brothers & Co. Ltd., Edinburgh. For services to Export.
- Hugh Patrick Holland. For political services in the North West.
- Maurice Bertram Holmes, Higher Executive Officer, Department of Health and Social Security.
- Walter Hood, lately Member, International Department, Trades Union Congress.
- Joseph Gwynfryn Howell, Assistant Chief Engineer, Welsh Industrial Estates Corporation.
- Phyllis Emily Howells. For services to the community in Tewkesbury.
- Richard Rollings Hudson, Export Director, Dimplex Ltd., Southampton. For services to Export.
- Grace Humphery (Grace Annie Harmsworth). For services to Music in Horsham.
- Alison Hay Shand Hunter, Councillor, East Elloe Rural District Council.
- Alderman Ernest Harry Illson, Member, Lutterworth Rural District Council.
- Barbara Louisa Innes, lately Senior Executive Officer, Department of Trade and Industry.
- Ivor Jarvis. For services to Brass Band music in Wales.
- Harold Jasperson, Member, Food Additives and Contaminants Committee.
- Hubert Parry Jeffreys, DFC, Flight Development Officer, British Overseas Airways Corporation.
- Harold Jenkins, Clerical Officer, Ministry of Defence.
- Olive Mary Jenkins, Member, Wales Staff (Training), Women's Royal Voluntary Service.
- Joyce Frideswyde Jenkinson, lately Manager, Personnel Central Services, Joseph Lucas Ltd., Birmingham.
- Kathleen Margaret Jennings, Honorary Secretary, Civilian Committee No. 2120 (Witney) Squadron, Air Training Corps.
- Edward Harold Towers Johnson, lately Foreign and Commonwealth Office.
- George Henry Johnson, Sales Office Manager, Brown Bayley Steels Ltd., Sheffield.
- Nora Harvey Johnson, Senior Scientific Officer, Department of the Environment.
- George Alfred Jones, Senior Executive Officer, Department of Health and Social Security.
- Meurig Jones, Head of Programme Planning, Harlech Television Ltd.
- Mary Joseph, BEM, Chairman, South Wales Street, Village and Social Groups Savings Committee.
- Irene Jukes, lately Ward Sister, Rampton Hospital, Department of Health and Social Security.
- Leonora Kay, Deputy Branch Director, Durham Branch, British Red Cross Society.
- Doris Margaret Keevil, Higher Executive Officer, Ministry of Defence.
- Dora Gertrude Keith, Senior Executive Officer, Department of the Environment.
- Stanley Kelly, Transport Manager, Marchon Division, Albright and Wilson. For services to Export.
- Stephen John Kent, Chairman, East Midlands Local Authorities Savings Committee.
- Edmond Henry Roberts Kerr, lately Town Clerk and Chamberlain, Carnoustie Town Council.
- Dorothy Roper Kessell. For services to the community in Whitehaven and district.
- Alfred King, Alderman, Todmorden Borough Council.
- Sydney Thomas King, BEM, Inspector of Taxes (Higher Grade), Board of Inland Revenue.
- Elizabeth Knowles, Head of Lower School, Levenshulme High School, Manchester.
- Eric Edward Lacy, QPM, Deputy Chief Constable, Leicester and Rutland Constabulary.
- Ronald Picton Lawrence, Deputy Director (Administration), West Wales Area, National Coal Board.
- Patricia Leslie, Foreign and Commonwealth Office.
- Charles David Lewis. For services to the community in Hope, Sheffield.
- Elfneda Elizabeth Magdelena Linton, Honorary Secretary and Liaison Officer, Association of Pharmacy Technicians.
- Ella Jane Lipman, lately Higher Executive Officer, Ministry of Agriculture, Fisheries and Food.
- Arthur Lockwood, Senior Executive Officer, Board of Inland Revenue.
- Kathleen Louisa Lynch, Senior Administrative Officer, Mary Ward College of Education, Nottingham.
- James Joseph McAteer, Technical Grade A (Building & Civil Engineering), Department of the Environment.
- Edith Bruce Slater Macbeth. For services to the welfare of HM Forces overseas.
- Robert McGrory, Education Officer, HM Remand Centre, Latchmere House, Richmond, Surrey.
- Margaret MacKinnon, Matron, Foresthall Hospital, Glasgow.
- Francis McLintock, Captain, Arsenal Football Club.
- Marjorie Florence McMillan, Senior Personal Secretary, Science Research Council.
- Harold Osborne McMurray, Deputy Managing Director. Kent Plastics (U.K.) Ltd., Enniskillen.
- Henry Mann, Honorary Secretary, 2/4 Queen's Royal Regiment Old Comrades Association.
- Elizabeth Martin, Councillor, Greenock Town Council.
- Major Arthur Edward Matthews, Retired Officer III, Ministry of Defence.
- Dorothy Florence Mayes, Managing Clerk, Patents Department, National Research Development Corporation.
- Leonard Arthur Meades, Engineer II, Ministry of Defence.
- Frederick Arthur Meardon, Chief Engineer (Marine), Newhaven, British Railways Board.
- Doris Mills, Secretary, Friends of Broadmoor.
- Charles Milne, Acting Clerical Officer, Ministry of Defence.
- James William Milne, Assistant Chief Constable, Stirling and Clackmannan.
- Charles James Minns, Finance Officer, Territorial Auxiliary and Volunteer Reserve Association for Eastern Wessex.
- Emily Mitchell, Chief Nursing Officer, Southport.
- Maggie Mockett, Tutor, The Victoria Hospital, Woking.
- James Richard Molloy, lately Manager, Welfare Services, Carrington, Shell Chemicals U.K. Ltd.
- Albert Sidney Moore, Member, North Merseyside Hospital Management Committee.
- John Leslie Moore. For services to the Scout Association in Surrey.
- Magdalene Woodrow Moore, Controller, Typing Services, Headquarters, Scottish Region, British Railways Board.
- Hugh Norman McRury Morrison, Honorary Secretary, Barra Island Lifeboat Station, Royal National Lifeboat Institution.
- Barrie Albert Walter Mortley, QFSM, Chief Officer, Flintshire Fire Brigade.
- William Geoffrey Mowforth, Inspector of Taxes (Higher Grade), Board of Inland Revenue.
- Mary Winefride Mulhall, Probation Officer, Liverpool Probation Service.
- Joseph Mulholland, Operations Officer, Scottish Ambulance Service.
- Edric Austen Mumby, Assistant County Surveyor, Essex County Council.
- Beatrice Agnes Murray, Senior Personal Secretary, Department of Trade and Industry.
- Joseph Patrick Murray, Curator, Museum of Childhood, Edinburgh.
- John Joseph Murtaugh, Works Superintendent, Construction Section, Durham County Council.
- Nan Esther Myer. For political and public services in East Anglia.
- Stanley Edward Napier, Principal Scientific Officer, Aldermaston, United Kingdom Atomic Energy Authority.
- Alexander Nichol, Chief Superintendent, West Mercia Constabulary.
- Richard Nicholls, Chairman, Settle Local Savings Committee.
- Clarice Nightingale, Senior Collector, Board of Inland Revenue.
- Dorothy Alison Nowicka, Clinic Superintendent, Sorrento Maternity Hospital, Moseley, Birmingham.
- George Thomas Nye, Grade 4 Officer, Department of Employment.
- Wilfred O'Brien, Postmaster, Merthyr Tydfil.
- William Patrick O'Donoghue. For political and public services in Essex.
- Doris Mary Pain, District Nurse, Jersey.
- Ernest Edward John Pallant, Member, Kent County Agricultural Executive Committee.
- Doreen Gladys Parker, Executive Officer, Ministry of Agriculture, Fisheries and Food.
- Samuel Joseph Parkes, lately Clerk, Torrington Borough Council.
- Peter Walton Pass. For services to Water-polo.
- Leonard Maslin Payne, Librarian, Royal College of Physicians.
- Eric William Payton, Chief Superintendent, Metropolitan Police.
- Kathleen Mary Payze, County Borough Organiser, Southend-on-Sea, Women's Royal Voluntary Service.
- Daniel Barr Peacock. For services to the community in Torpoint, Cornwall.
- Edith Pike. For political and public services in London.
- Sidney Walter Pinn, Service Member, Pensions Appeal Tribunals.
- Frederick Henry George Pitt, Manager, Research and Developments Department, Kodak Ltd. For services to Export.
- John Platt, Chief Superintendent, Royal Ulster Constabulary.
- Captain Idris Charles Player, Chairman, Sussex War Pensions Committee.
- Leslie Ernest Plenty, Secretary, Central Transport Consultative Committee.
- Edwin David Glynn Pockett, Superintendent, South Wales Constabulary.
- Kenneth Robert Polton, Honorary Treasurer, Haemophilia Society.
- George Porter, Senior Technical Officer, Laboratory Animals Centre, Medical Research Council.
- Lilian Alice Prowse. For political services.
- John William Regan, Chief Test Engineer, Williams & James (Engineers) Ltd., Gloucester.
- James Leslie Reid, Assistant Traffic Superintendent, Aberdeen Corporation Transport Department.
- William John Donald Reynolds, Group Secretary and Treasurer, St. Augustines Hospital Management Committee.
- Roy Albert Elkin Ricks, Higher Executive Officer, Department of Health and Social Security.
- Edward Basil Heton Roberton, AFC, Head Postmaster, Barnet.
- George Roberts, Town Councillor, Aberdeen.
- Margaret Dora Robertson, lately Headmistress, Oakley County Primary School, Bedford.
- Gordon Solomon Robinson, Surveyor, Chief Grade, Ordnance Survey.
- Leonard William Roeder, Higher Executive Officer, Board of Inland Revenue.
- Maurice Aron Sabah, lately Zone Manager, Export Department, Mond Division, Imperial Chemical Industries Ltd. For services to Export.
- Nancy Millicent Sale, County Staff Officer (Training), County of Buckingham, St. John Ambulance Association and Brigade.
- Frederick William Sales, Secretary, The Queen's Own Regimental Association.
- Margaret Sarsfield, Nursing Officer, Calderstones Hospital, Whalley, Blackburn.
- Thomas Wingate Saul, Chairman, Somerset and Wiltshire Trustee Savings Bank.
- Nannie Mitchell Savage, Senior Mistress, Belfast Royal Academy.
- Ellwood Scott, Chairman and Managing Director, John T. Scott & Son (Carlisle) Ltd. For services to Export.
- Ellen Marjorie Shelton, Executive Officer Grade II, London Fire Brigade.
- Ruth Siggs, Maintenance Officer, Newport Pagnell Savings Committee.
- Alfred Howard Simcocks. For services to the Royal British Legion in the Isle of Man.
- Violet Annie Sloman, Treasurer, Plymouth Society for Mentally Handicapped Children.
- Joan Betty Smith, lately Secretary, Wolverhampton Council of Boys' Clubs.
- Ronald William Smoothey, Art Master, Royal Grammar School, Guildford.
- Gladys Mary Spencer, Higher Executive Officer, Department of Health and Social Security.
- John James Spragg, MC, Overseas Marketing Director, Associated Book Publishers (International) Ltd.
- Kathleen Naomi Squires, Honorary Secretary, League of Friends of Hospitals of Luton and Dunstable.
- James Stark, Chairman, Nairn Local Savings Committee.
- Margaret Hay Steven. For services to the community life in Edinburgh Prison.
- Elizabeth Margaret Stone, lately Matron, Nuffield Orthopaedic Hospital, Oxford.
- James Strachan. For services to training in the Scottish Fishing Industry.
- Charles Daniel Streeter, Senior Executive Officer, Ministry of Posts and Telecommunications.
- James Godwin Strong, Chief Stressman and Structures Design Group Leader (Air Guided Weapons), Hawker Siddeley Dynamics Ltd.
- Eric Mark Tatlow. For services to the Building Industry in Staffordshire.
- Ernest Norman Taylor, Design Director, Barpak Laboratories Ltd., Grantham.
- Edward Leonard Lalouel Martin Thomas, Secretary, Central Council, Ulster '71.
- Peter Arthur Aubrey Thomas, Senior Executive Officer, Ministry of Defence.
- John Ernest Thompson, Inspector of Taxes (Higher Grade), Board of Inland Revenue.
- Marie Thomson (Mrs. Tainsh), Teacher and interpreter of Scots songs.
- Daisy Lilian Thurston, Higher Clerical Officer, HM Stationery Office.
- Kenneth Alfred Noel Thwaite, TD, Executive Engineer, County Surveyors' Department, Hampshire County Council.
- William Henry Tooes, Member of Portsmouth Executive Council and North Hampshire Hospital Management Committee.
- Harry Truman, Consultant, Metallurgical and Marketing, Power Gas Corporation Ltd. For services to Export.
- Derick Turner, Secretary, British Pottery Manufacturers' Federation.
- Kenneth Jack Uglow, Deputy Chairman, Cornwall Agricultural Executive Committee.
- Nicolette Daisy Milnes Walker. For sailing.
- Robert Thomas Wall, Senior Surveyor, Air Registration Board.
- John Wallace, Secretary and Treasurer, Board of Management for Stirling, Falkirk and Alloa Hospitals.
- The Reverend William Cameron Wallace, Church of Scotland Industrial Chaplain to the Shipbuilding Community on the Lower Clyde.
- Joseph Wallwork, Drawing Office Manager, S.H.E.L. Division, Simon-Carves Ltd. For services to Export.
- Edward Bernard Walters. For services to industry in Mid-Wales.
- Arthur Edward Nelson Wase, Senior Executive Engineer, International and Maritime Telecommunications Region, Post Office.
- Harold Yearly Waterer, Committee Member, St. Albans Unit, Sea Cadet Corps.
- George Wright Watson, Higher Executive Officer, Office for Wales, Department of Trade and Industry.
- Frank Arthur West, Secretary, Devonport Branch, Royal Naval Benevolent Trust.
- Vera Gore Whatnall, Senior Clerical Assistant, Association of Municipal Corporations.
- Dora Isabel Whisker, lately Secretary to the Director, Ulster Museum, Belfast.
- Kate Elizabeth White, Personal Secretary to Chief Secretary, British Railways Board.
- Patrick Joseph Anthony White, Preventive Officer, Board of Customs and Excise.
- Robert William White, Senior Scientific Officer, Institute of Animal Physiology, Babraham, Cambridge.
- Thomas Douglas White, Senior Collector, Board of Inland Revenue.
- John Whitehorn, Clerk, Transport Department, Hawker Siddeley Aviation Ltd.
- Henry Ambrose Whitemore, Member, Somerset County Agricultural Executive Committee.
- Mary Baird Whittow, Nursing Officer, University College Hospital, London.
- David Widdowson, Assistant, Secretary's Department, British National Export Council. For services to Export.
- Jeanette Katherine Agnes Beveridge Stevenson Williamson. Instructor in Navigation to Shetland Fishermen.
- The Reverend Henry Norman Willox, lately Chaplain, State Hospital, Carstairs.
- Adrian George McDonnell Willson, Senior Executive Officer, Department of Trade and Industry.
- Edith Marjorie Wilson, lately Headmistress, Biscovey County Infants' School, St. Austell, Cornwall.
- Maisie Winchester Radford Wilson, Higher Executive Officer, Scottish Office.
- Eric Cecil Winser, Research Assistant I, Science Museum.
- Charles Henry Wolff, Head of Data Handling Division, Plessey Telecommunications Research Ltd.
- Samuel Wood, Library Assistant, Royal College of Surgeons.
- James Latham Wooding, MM. For political services in the North West.
- Maimi Ethel Wright, Alderman, Macclesfield Borough Council.
- Colin William Yeo. For services to The British Deer Society.
- Edward Raymond Yescombe, Librarian, Polytechnic of North London.
- John Young, Senior Executive Officer, Department of the Environment.
- Meredith Francis Charles Young, lately Resident Superintendent, Union Jack Club.
- Royce Young, Chief Public Health Inspector, Nottingham City Council.

Diplomatic Service and Overseas List

- Reuben Christopher Alias. For services to sport in Bermuda.
- Constance Baptists. For services to nursing in Dominica.
- Trevor John Bedford, Police Civil Secretary, Royal Hong Kong Police Force.
- Lulu Valerie Bench. For charitable and welfare services to the British community in Naples.
- Carol Amy Blair. For services to British cultural interests in Chile.
- George Alfred Borrill, Grade 7 Officer, HM Embassy, Paris.
- Eric Brewis. For services to the British community in Chittagong.
- Hylda Bull, Typist, lately United Kingdom Delegation to the European Communities, Brussels.
- Harold Zachary Byatt, Press Attaché, HM Embassy, Athens.
- Charles Marie Emmanuel Cadet, Permanent Secretary, Development, Planning and Statistics, Premier's Office, St. Lucia.
- Gertie Choa. For services to the Girl Guide Movement in Hong Kong.
- Augustus Leslie Cole. For services to the British community in Bombay.
- Sharaefa Abdul Curreem, Senior Personal Secretary, Marine Department, Hong Kong.
- Herbert Andrea Dang Fang, Chief Foreman of Works, Public Works Department, Seychelles.
- Victor Edward Day, lately Passport Officer, British High Commission, Kuala Lumpur.
- Joseph Hayes Desir, JP. For services to the community in St. Lucia.
- James Donald Earnshaw. For services to British commercial interests in Kenya.
- David Henry Eccles, Senior Fisheries Research Officer, Malawi.
- Cynthia Marguerite Espinoza. For services to the British community in Paraguay (died 17 December 1971).
- Arthur Fairclough, Grade 9 Officer, HM Embassy, Paris.
- Major John Knox Forte, lately Honorary British Vice-Consul, Corfu.
- Leonard Hall, lately Grade 9 Officer, British Deputy High Commission, Dacca.
- Manuel Edward Hermida, Head of Arts and Crafts Department, Gibraltar Grammar School.
- Will Caradoc Hodgkins, lately HM Consul (Commercial), British Trade Development Office, New York.
- Idwal Walwyn Hughes, Deputy Director, Department of Agriculture and Fisheries, Bermuda.
- Lieutenant-Commander Richard Kennedy Husband, Royal Navy (Retired), lately British Technical Assistance Officer, East Pakistan.
- Doris Jaques, lately Head of Features Section, British Information Services, Bonn.
- Jesamine Jarvis, lately Tutor, National Teachers' College, Uganda.
- John Richard Jerman, Agricultural Officer, Swaziland.
- Robert Richard Randolph Johnston. For services to the trade union movement in Bermuda.
- Ralph Kirker, Deputy Permanent Secretary, Ministry of Finance, Lesotho.
- James Charles William Lawrence, Principal Administrative Officer, Ministry of Transport and Communications, Malawi.
- Leo Lee Tung-hoi. For services to the community in Hong Kong.
- David Levy, Chief Surveyor, Public Works, Swaziland.
- Jack Charles Long, Second Secretary (Commercial/Aid), British Deputy High Commission, Dacca.
- Brendan McCourt, Headmaster, Aga Khan Secondary School, Kampala, Uganda.
- Alexander Murdo Macleod, RD, lately British Technical Assistance Officer, Bogota.
- Obed McField Malone. For services to education and the community in the British Virgin Islands.
- Frank Horace Manley, DVM, MRCVS. For services to veterinary science at the Animal Health and Industry Training Institute, Nairobi.
- Albert Arthur Mason, Senior Electrical Inspector, Seychelles.
- Phyllis Margaret Milne. For services to the British community in Portugal.
- John Nathaniel Morris, Inspector of Schools, Grenada.
- Elisabeth Muirhead, Grade 10 Officer, HM Embassy, Helsinki.
- Alasdair Liddell Munro, Principal Assistant Secretary, Ministry of Works, Lesotho.
- George Smith Murchie, lately Attaché, HM Embassy, Peking.
- Jemima McDonald Musallem, Matron and Sister Tutor, Arab Evangelical Hospital, Nablus.
- Jack Talbot Myers, lately Grade 9 Officer, HM Embassy, Washington.
- Leslie John Alexander Nisbet, Electrical Superintendent, Electricity Board, British Honduras.
- Marjorie Noble, Chief Librarian, British Council, Indonesia.
- Joseph Thomas Noguera. For services to music in Gibraltar.
- Frederick Aubarua Osifelo, Administrative Officer Class B, British Solomon Islands Protectorate.
- Smna Michael Palaniandy. For services to the British Red Cross Society in Brunei.
- Beryl Rowden Price. For services to the British community in Mogadishu.
- David John Pugh, lately First Secretary and Consul, HM Embassy, Tripoli.
- Maud Pygall, Inspectoress for Domestic Science, Swaziland Government.
- Beatrice Rae. For services to the British community in Naples.
- Babitha Krishnahurthy Sanjeeva Rao, Commercial Officer, British Deputy High Commission, Madras.
- Jeanette Elizabeth Rowe, JP, Senior Education Officer, Hong Kong.
- Eileen Mary Shaw. For services to the British Red Cross Society in Nairobi.
- Stephen Sipolo, Senior Housemaster, King George VI School, British Solomon Islands Protectorate.
- John Frederick Skelton, lately Second Secretary (Administration), British Deputy High Commission, Dacca.
- Dorothy Gray Snape. For services to nursing in Bermuda.
- Harold Thompson, lately First Secretary (Administration), British High Commission, Singapore.
- Kenneth Thomson, Secretary/Chief Accountant, Swaziland Electricity Board.
- Eric Watkinson, British Technical Assistance Officer, Malaysia.
- John Campbell Whitlam, MB, ChB, Senior Medical Officer, Sibu, Sarawak.
- Ruth Elizabeth Willis. For services to nursing in Dubai

Australian States
State of New South Wales

- Mary Catherine Byrne (Sister Mary Anne). For services to medicine.
- Barbara Mary Chisholm. For services to education.
- Jean Fisher. For services to the State.
- Evonne Fay Goolagong. For services to sport.
- Edith Glencairn Gordon. For services to the community.
- Councillor Winston Michael Gray. For services to the community.
- Fifi Olive Annette Hawthorne. For services to education.
- George Henry Hewitt, MB, ChM. For services to the community.
- Terence Asher Hunt. For services to music.
- Elsa Antoinette Ruth Jacoby. For services to the community.
- Alan Milton Porter, BEM, ED. For services to ex-servicemen.
- Robert Robertson. For services to education.
- Joyce Mary Snelling. For services to ex-servicewomen.
- Dorothy Kathleen Tritton. For services to the community.

State of Victoria

- Councillor Harry Houston Alexander, of Euroa. For services to sport and the community.
- James Moore Andrew, MD, BS, of Yallourn. For services to medicine and the community.
- Charles William Haddon Barnes. For services as Registrar, Church of England Diocese of Melbourne.
- Ada Alice Ely, JP, of Moonee Ponds. For services to the community.
- Lewis James Graves, of Mansfield. For services to the community.
- Alexander Gray, of Mount Eliza. For services to the community.
- Councillor Hector George Greiner, ED, of Tongala. For public services.
- Theseus John Marmaras, of Elsternwick. For services to the community and especially the Greek community in Melbourne.
- Councillor Laurence Patrick Mitchell, of Doreen. For public services.
- Mildred Margaret Gates, of Cobden. For services to Cobden and District Bush Nursing Hospital.
- Cyril Clement Jerome Thomas, of Balwyn. For services to the community and especially to paraplegics.
- Councillor Charles Leslie Willis, of Vermont. For services to the community.
- William Henry Keith Young, of Ballarat. For services to music and the community.

State of Queensland

- The Reverend Ivan Wells Alcorn, of Brisbane. For services to the Methodist Church and the community.
- Ronald Frederick Cornish, of Brisbane. For services to journalism.
- Joan Lorraine Guthrie, of Brisbane. For services to guiding and the community.
- Councillor Elsie Margaret Langston, of Jericho. For services to local government.
- Councillor Alfred Whitney O'Rourke, of Biloela. For services to local government.
- Phyllis Babette Stephens, of Brisbane. For services to the theatre.
- Harry Norman Taylor, of Dalby. For services to the Queensland Ambulance Transport Brigade.

State of South Australia

- The Reverend Lionel Francis Ashman, of Brompton. For services to the Methodist Church and the community.
- Percy John Baillie, of Port Lincoln. For services to local history.
- Olive Dulcie Freudenberg, lately Clerk to the Public Service Board.
- James Joseph Honner, JP, of Brentwood. For public services.
- Elsie Catherine Lahne, lately Matron, Mount Pleasant Hospital.
- Paul Francis Lawson, Senior Preparator, the South Australian Museum.

State of Tasmania

- Myrtle Susannah Mansfield, of Rosebery. For services to the community.
- Clive Henry Sansom, of Hobart. For services to literature and education.
- Alice Jean Thomas, of Latrobe. For services to the arts and the community.

=== Order of the Companions of Honour (CH) ===
- Sir Peter Brian Medawar, CBE, FRS. For services to Medical Research.

=== Companion of the Imperial Service Order (ISO) ===
Home Civil Service

- Adam Banks, Senior Principal Scientific Officer, Department of Trade and Industry.
- Elizabeth Joan Beaven, Principal, HM Treasury.
- Thomas Patrick Boyd, MM, Principal, Department of Health and Social Security.
- Frank Cleveland Cadogan, Defence Civilian Administrative Officer, Malta, Ministry of Defence.
- John Herbert Comper, Senior Principal, Department of Education and Science.
- Sydney Robert Craxford, Senior Principal Scientific Officer, Department of Trade and Industry.
- Cyril James Errington, Principal, HM Stationery Office.
- Charles William Everett, Principal, Department of the Environment.
- Leslie Harold Foss, Principal, Home Office.
- Edward Hayhow High, Principal, Ministry of Agriculture, Fisheries and Food.
- Vincent George Hilbourne, Principal, Department of Health and Social Security.
- Walter William Jordan, Official Receiver, Department of Trade and Industry.
- Kenneth Lightfoot, Principal, Department of the Environment.
- William George Motley, Senior Inspector of Taxes, Board of Inland Revenue.
- Walter John Pickering, Principal, Principal Probate Registry.
- William Percy Richardson, Deputy Chief Inspector, Ministry of Agriculture for Northern Ireland.
- Frederick Thomas Simmons, Principal, Paymaster General's Office.
- Donald John Stevenson, lately Principal Clerk of Justiciary.
- Archibald Joseph Symonds, Principal, Ministry of Defence.
- Albert Edward Taylor, lately Assistant Director (Engineer), Ministry of Defence.
- Harold Tilton, lately Engineer Grade I, Ministry of Defence.
- Charles Henry Windeatt, Principal, Board of Inland Revenue.
- Thomas Fred Winterburn, Senior Architect, Department of the Environment.

Diplomatic and Overseas List

- Chin Sit-kee, Executive Officer Class I, Legal Department, Hong Kong.
- James David McGregor, Assistant Director, Commerce and Industry Department, Hong Kong.

Australian States
State of New South Wales

- James Daniel Rimes, Under Secretary, Department of Public Health.

State of Victoria

- Ian John O'Donnell, OBE, ED, lately Chairman of the Country Roads Board

State of Queensland

- Harold Neil Smith, Commissioner for Electricity Supply.

=== British Empire Medal (BEM) ===
Military Division

Royal Navy

- Petty Officer Cook M. Acklan, G/LX25921.
- Chief Ordnance Electrical Artificer (O) William Edward Adnitt, P/MX 99322.
- Chief Communications Yeoman (TCI) Antony Vincent Atkinson, P/JX 716925.
- Chief Petty Officer Writer Leslie Thomas Balcombe, P/M 929381.
- Aircraft Mechanician (AE) First Class John Glaister Batty, L/FX 910594.
- Chief Petty Officer (QR1(A)) Francis George Beamish, D/JX 712818.
- Chief Petty Officer (GI) Hubert James Hollins Bowen, D/JX 166631.
- Chief Petty Officer Medical Assistant Donald Gordon Brown, D/MX 866043.
- Chief Petty Officer (Coxswain) Bertie George Bunting, P/JX 165327.
- Marine Engineering Artificer First Class (H) Charles Thomas Chowne, P/MX 126336.
- Colour Sergeant Bugler Eric George Close, CH/X 3926.
- Chief Communications Yeoman (CA) Gordon Percy Daniels, C/JX 139607.
- Chief Petty Officer Writer Joseph Dolman, P/MX 859668.
- Marine Engineering Artificer (H) James Baird Flurey, J/988829, Royal Naval Reserve.
- Chief Wren Steward (G) Joan Kathleen Hall, WO 76517K.
- Colour Sergeant Peter Michael Hoban, RM 9676.
- Chief Marine Engineering Artificer (P) Robert George Ives, P/M 928984.
- Chief Ordnance Electrician Leon Maurice Jones, MX 856334.
- Chief Petty Officer Cook (S) George Spencer King, P/MX 60764.
- Chief Petty Officer (GLI) Reginald Francis Knott, D/JX 157534.
- Chief Petty Officer (BTI) John William Lavender, D/JX 841641.
- Master-at-Arms Peter Bolton Lee, P/MX 646303. Formerly serving with the Royal Navy Training Team, Kenya.
- Chief Marine Engineering Artificer (P) Ronald George Maddern, P/MX 502981.
- Chief Marine Engineering Mechanic Robert Souttar McEwan, D/KX 903298.
- Chief Petty Officer (O) Gerald Parsons, D/JX 853752.
- Aircraft Mechanician (AE) First Class John William Pennington, L/F 927144.
- Colour Sergeant Kenneth George Stone, CH/X 4185.
- Chief Petty Officer (Coxswain) Joseph Thomas, P/JX 158578.
- Chief Control Electrician Joseph Orlando Valerio, P/MX 895469.
- Marine Allan Paul Ward, RM 26015.

Army

- 22545949 Sergeant Alfred Victor Axworthy, Grenadier Guards.
- 23992346 Lance Corporal John Edward Bindokas, Corps of Royal Electrical and Mechanical Engineers.
- 23492424 Staff Sergeant Geoffrey George Hampshire Brien, Corps of Royal Military Police.
- 22100323 Corporal William Samuel Burley, Royal Corps of Signals.
- 23686073 Sergeant Brian Granville Chafer, The Parachute Regiment.
- 24174222 Corporal William Darby-Jones, Corps of Royal Military Police.
- 14042519 Warrant Officer Class II (Local) John Donald, The Gordon Highlanders.
- 23996104 Sergeant David Ian Duncan, Intelligence Corps.
- 22286490 Staff Sergeant William Geoffrey Elliott, 9th/12th Royal Lancers (Prince of Wales's).
- 18188784 Sergeant (Acting) Lawrence Fernandez, Royal Corps of Signals.
- 23501872 Sergeant (Acting) George Alfred Garside, Royal Corps of Signals.
- 23882520 Corporal Henry John Green, The Queen's Regiment.
- 23225118 Staff Sergeant Ronald Masterman Greenshaw, Royal Army Ordnance Corps.
- 22825189 Staff Sergeant (Acting) Anthony Sylvester Halls, Royal Army Ordnance Corps.
- 22270654 Corporal Wilfred Stanley Harris, Royal Corps of Transport, Territorial and Army Volunteer Reserve.
- 23661717 Warrant Officer Class II (Acting) John Peter Hindley, Royal Army Medical Corps.
- 23820772 Sergeant (Acting) James Hodge, Royal Corps of Signals.
- 22542345 Sergeant Gordon Albert Jupp, Corps of Royal Electrical and Mechanical Engineers.
- W/144514 Staff Sergeant (Acting) Edith Leach, Women's Royal Army Corps.
- 23722309 Staff Sergeant Rainer Friedrich Walter Livesey, Royal Corps of Signals.
- 14429727 Sergeant Maurice Crocker Martin 13th/18th Royal Hussars (Queen Mary's Own).
- 22596436 Sergeant Frederick George Miller, Army Catering Corps.
- 23243519 Warrant Officer Class II (Acting) Thomas Frederick Pickering, Royal Corps of Transport.
- 23658940 Staff Sergeant (Acting) Ieuan Glyndwr Powys, Royal Regiment of Artillery.
- 23958763 Staff Sergeant William Paul Reeves, Royal Army Ordnance Corps.
- 23226434 Sergeant Terry Rice, Corps of Royal Military Police.
- 23897544 Corporal Harvey Keith Shillabeer, Royal Army Ordnance Corps.
- 22265997 Staff Sergeant Philip Frederick Simmonds, Royal Corps of Signals.
- 22447773 Staff Sergeant Ronald Albert Solman, The Devonshire and Dorset Regiment.
- 2628408 Warrant Officer Class II (Local) Peter Ronald Taylor, Grenadier Guards.
- 23759355 Staff Sergeant William Tweddle, Royal Army Ordnance Corps.
- 23695367 Sergeant Edward John Ward, The Parachute Regiment.
- 22137297 Staff Sergeant Thomas Winters, Queen's Own Highlanders (Seaforth and Camerons).
- 22547564 Staff Sergeant Donald Percy Wood, Corps of Royal Military Police.
- 23732982 Staff Sergeant Wilfred Wright, Royal Army Ordnance Corps.

Royal Air Force

- X4110494 Flight Sergeant Terrence Robin Cartwright.
- G3500637 Flight Sergeant Donald Beverley Griffiths.
- H4035089 Flight Sergeant Thomas Derek Heuchan.
- QO584953 Flight Sergeant Maurice William Hill.
- NO592598 Flight Sergeant John Irving.
- D4029567 Flight Sergeant Gerard Stephen Joseph Nicholl, RAF Regiment.
- NO592956 Flight Sergeant Edward John Parker.
- XO584977 Flight Sergeant William Henry Robinson.
- C4158968 Flight Sergeant Martin Smith.
- Q1408541 Flight Sergeant Leslie Walter Sowden.
- N3128212 Flight Sergeant David Morgan Tabor.
- F4082646 Flight Sergeant David Arthur Walker.
- G2320662 Flight Sergeant Joseph William Wood.
- AO547247 Acting Flight Sergeant Godwin Goodwin Fox.
- S2732893 Acting Flight Sergeant David John Short.
- EO578594 Chief Technician Geoffrey Bolton.
- TO586670 Chief Technician Stanley Keith Gauntlett.
- F3520432 Chief Technician John Robert Mackenzie.
- KO58737S Chief Technician Michael George Webster Pepper.
- C1922339 Chief Technician Ernest John Quantrill.
- Q3512534 Chief Technician Sidney John West.
- U1923008 Chief Technician Cecil Julian White. For services with the Royal Malaysian Air Force.
- FO680222 Chief Technician David Charles Widdows.
- XO589341 Chief Technician Jeffrey John Wilkinson.
- G1481527 Sergeant Robert Couchman.
- X5062443 Sergeant Peter Kelsall.
- Q2718054 Sergeant Roy Steel Marshall.
- G4052835 Sergeant Raymond Robinson.
- T4237457 Sergeant David Charles Saunders.
- F0586134 Sergeant Joseph Trotter.
- X4149509 Sergeant Peter James Wright.
- F3080211 Acting Sergeant Colin Gregory Pibworth.
- E4107909 Corporal David Arthur Bolam.
- S4239629 Corporal Thomas James Hatch.
- U4262491 Corporal Francis Iddon.
- G1940493 Corporal Gerard Anthony Webb.

Civil Division

United Kingdom

- Frederick Ernest Adams, Senior Messenger, Department of Education and Science.
- Constance Almond, National Savings Street Group Collector, Sheffield.
- James Amor, Theatre Technician, Royal Berkshire Hospital, Reading.
- Charles William Anderson, Inspector, Derby Engine Division, Rolls-Royce (1971) Ltd.
- William Anderson, Commandant, City of Glasgow Special Constabulary.
- Arthur Richard Ashbee, lately Sergeant, Essex and Southend-on-Sea Joint Constabulary.
- Albert James Ashenden, Assistant (Equipment), Television Outside Broadcasts, British Broadcasting Corporation.
- Ronald Leslie Barber, Gas Fitter, Southern Gas Board, Newport, Isle of Wight.
- Keith Barker, Electrician, Rotherham District, Sheffield Area, Yorkshire Electricity Board.
- Arthur Barrowman, Stores Supervisory Grade III, Stores Depot, Aston Down, Ministry of Defence.
- John Batten, Works Technical Grade II, RAF Benson, Department of the Environment.
- Henry Charles Beard, Automatic Tram Operator, London Transport Executive.
- Victoria Beaumont, District Organiser, Crayford, London Borough of Bexley, Women's Royal Voluntary Service.
- William Victor Beck, Foreign and Commonwealth Office.
- George Bennett, Chargehand Motor Transport Driver, Royal Air Force Movement Unit, Belfast, Ministry of Defence.
- Lawrence Bewley, Foreign and Commonwealth Office.
- William Blackman, Head Doorman, Head Office, Commonwealth Development Corporation.
- Annie Blaney, lately Manageress, Navy, Army and Air Force Institutes, Junior Ranks Club, St. Patricks Barracks, Ballymena, County Antrim, Northern Ireland.
- Ernest Thomas Bonnefoy, Servicelayer, Distribution, North Thames Gas Board.
- Edward Henry Bowden, Senior Scientific Assistant, Gosport Branch Laboratory, Armed Services Food Supplies Division, Laboratory of the Government Chemist.
- George Thomas Bradley, Terminal Overseer, Freightliner, Manchester.
- Joseph Brindle, Chargehand Process Worker, British Nuclear Fuels., Springfields Works.
- David Turnbull Brotherstone, Specialist Roadman, Berwickshire County Council.
- James Edward Brown, Constable, Thames Valley Police.
- Arthur Bryan, Colliery Deputy, Ollerton Colliery, North Nottinghamshire Area, National Coal Board.
- Archibald Stewart Bryce, Technical Officer, Scarborough Telephone Exchange, Post Office, North Eastern Telecommunications Region.
- Barbara Buchan, Canteen Manageress, Fraserburgh Unit, Sea Cadet Corps.
- Rex Buckley, Engineering Technical Officer, Grade II, Royal Aircraft Establishment, Bedford, Ministry of Defence.
- Dennis James Burns, Rigid Mill Operator, Doncasters Monkbridge Ltd., Leeds.
- William Duncan Chisholm, Boatswain, Pharos Lighthouse Tender, Northern Lighthouse Board.
- Thomas Hedley Coffield, Station Officer, Durham Fire Brigade.
- William Eric John Coleman, Senior Overman, Daw Mill Colliery, South Midlands Area, National Coal Board.
- William Henry Collins, Senior Warehouse Supervisor, HM Stationery Office.
- Percy William Cotterill, Senior Foreman, Cine Film Finishing Department, Brentwood Factory, Ilford Ltd.
- Matthew Ridley Cowans, Head Shepherd, Thropton, Morpeth, Northumberland.
- Patrick Gerard Coyle, Technical Grade II, Londonderry Works Depot, Department of the Environment.
- Alfred Edward Dalton, Head Cleaner, Parliament Buildings, Stormont.
- Frederick Desmond Da Vies, Chargehand, Remploy Factory, Tonyrefail, Glamorgan.
- Samuel Lewis Davies, lately Works and Highways Superintendent, Caerphilly Urban District Council.
- Thomas Lodwick Davies, lately Senior Paper-keeper, Welsh Office.
- Edward James Davis, Technical Officer Grade II, Engineering Planning and Progress Officer, No. 25 Maintenance Unit, RAF Hartlebury, Ministry of Defence.
- William Denham, Company Commandant, Glasgow National Dock Labour Board Company, St. Andrew's Ambulance Association.
- Robert George Dodds, Technical Officer Grade III, General Trades Section, 46 Command Workshop, REME, Ministry of Defence.
- Herbert Francis Doe, Technical Officer Grade III, Aeroplane and Armament Experimental Establishment, Boscombe Down, Ministry of Defence.
- George Ernest Doubleday, Sub-Officer, Nottinghamshire Fire Brigade.
- Alfred Downing, Assembler, C. & J. Hampton Ltd., Sheffield.
- Charles Leslie Draper, Sub-Postmaster, Birchwood Town Sub-Office Hatfield, Hertfordshire.
- Harriet Thurzo Dyball, Member, County Borough Staff, Doncaster, Women's Royal Voluntary Service.
- Thomas Edwards, Experimental Gardener, Grade I, Trawscoed Experimental Husbandry Farm, near Aberystwyth.
- Edward Egli, Senior Laboratory Technician, Research and Development Department, A.P.T. Electronic Industries Ltd, Byfleet, Surrey.
- Rose Emery, National Savings Places of Employment, Social Organisations and Street Groups Collector, Lyminge, Kent.
- Margaret Clapham Evans, Chief Observer, No. 21 Group, Royal Observer Corps.
- John Palmerston Fairclough, Assembly Superintendent, Defence Systems, Sperry Gyroscope Ltd.
- Colin Bird Falconer, Station Officer, Hampshire Fire Brigade.
- George Edward Fisher, Head Chauffeur, Head Office, British Steel Corporation.
- Charles Frederick Flood, Senior Agent, George Wimpey & Co.
- Stanley Cecil Foreman, lately Mayor's Attendant, London Borough of Newham.
- Thomas Edward Forrest, Sergeant, Royal Ulster Constabulary.
- Alice Milne French, Chief Supervisor, Talisman Telephone Exchange, Edinburgh.
- Blenheim Charles Fry, Station Officer, London Fire Brigade.
- Thomas Gaskell, lately Fieldsman, Grade "A", Agricultural Development and Advisory Services, Shardlow Hall, near Derby, Ministry of Agriculture, Fisheries and Food.
- Olive Giles, National Savings Street Groups Collector, Taunton.
- William Gillie, Heavy Goods Vehicle Driver, Wake Bros. (Haulage) Ltd., Marfleet Industrial Estate, Hull.
- Frances Nora Grace, Commandant, Herts/96 Detachment, British Red Cross Society.
- Thomas James Gracey, Sergeant, Royal Ulster Constabulary.
- Joseph Grayson, Repairer, Goldthorpe Highgate Colliery, Doncaster Area, National Coal Board.
- Doris Mabel Halgarth, Foster Mother, Holland County Council, Lincolnshire.
- Lucy Hallam, lately Cleaner, Office of Official Receiver in Bankruptcy, Nottingham.
- James Irvine Hamilton, Open Space Superintendent, Greater London Council.
- James Francis Frederick Hanna, Senior Surgery Assistant, Royal Naval Aircraft Yard, Belfast, Ministry of Defence.
- George Harrison, Motor Mechanic, Lytham St. Anne's Lifeboat, Royal National Lifeboat Institution.
- Mabel Elizabeth Harvey, Medical Orderly, Preston Barracks, Brighton, Ministry of Defence.
- William Edward Hatton, Canteen Manager, Navy, Army and Air Force Institutes, HMS Minerva, B.F.P.O. Ships.
- Albert John Hayward, Operational Foreman, Ocker Hill Power Station, Midlands Region, Central Electricity Generating Board.
- Anthony Henry Hazell, Chargehand Linesman, Oxford District, Southern Electricity Board.
- Victoria May Henshaw, Transport Organiser, Huntingdon and Peterborough, Women's Royal Voluntary Service.
- Joyce Ada Murray Hewlett, Welfare Worker, Westminster Division, County of London Branch, British Red Cross Society.
- Kenneth Hitchcock, Sergeant, Metropolitan Police.
- Cyril Edward Holmes, Superintendent, Manufacturing Department, Guided Weapons Division, British Aircraft Corporation Ltd., Bristol.
- Frank Leol Howard, Foreman Erector, Electric Overhead Cranes, Herbert Morris Ltd., Loughborough. For services to Export.
- Alfred Frederick Alec Hurley, lately Messenger, Civil Service Pay Research Unit.
- John Jardine, for services in the Joinery Department, Wm. Loudon & Sons Ltd, Cleland, Lanarkshire.
- Leslie Arnold Jeffs, Civilian Instructor, No. 2331 (St. Ives) Squadron, Air Training Corps.
- David Johnston, Ferryman, Islands of Yell, Unst and Fetlar, Shetland.
- George Alfred John Jones, Sergeant, Metropolitan Police.
- Sydney Ernest Jones, Foreman Fitter and Turner, Experimental Department, Gilmans Ltd., Skatoskalo Works, Warwick.
- Roy Weaving Joplin. For services to the community in Lowestoft.
- Lionel Leslie Kitchener, Constable, Metropolitan Police.
- Joseph Frederick Leatherbarrow, Fire Safety Officer, St. George's Hospital, Morpeth, Northumberland.
- Frederick Linley, Chief Superintendent, East Midlands Road Patrols, Royal Automobile Club.
- George Littlejohn, lately Catering Officer, Barlinnie Prison, Glasgow.
- Gwilym Elwyn Lloyd, Assistant Estate Engineer, Welsh Industrial Estates Corporation, Bridgend, Glamorgan.
- Victor Lloyd, Underground Onsetter, Cotgrave Colliery, South Nottinghamshire, National Coal Board.
- John Charles Logan, lately Shotblaster, Craigneuk Works, Special Steels Division, British Steel Corporation.
- Sidney Longcroft, Chief Inspector, Birmingham City Police.
- Edward George Lugg, Service Layer, Exeter, South Western Gas Board.
- Walter Edward James Luxford, Site Agent, Messrs. Howe & White, Building Contractors.
- Rebecca Lyell, Cook/Supervisor, Felling Government Training Centre, Industrial Rehabilitation Unit.
- Andrew McBride, Tanker Driver, Jarrow Terminal, Shell-Mex and BP.
- Maurice Victor Millar McCall, National Savings Group Collector, Darkley, Keady, County Armagh.
- Annie Shoolbraid McEwan, Acting Deputy Ward Sister, Hartwood Hospital, Shotts, Lanarkshire.
- Hugh McGauran, Senior General Foreman, Cementation Construction Ltd.
- Kenneth Maclennan, Quartermaster/Able Seaman, MV City of Montreal, General Service Contracts.
- John Maddison, Ganger, Wm. Thorpe & Son Ltd., Building Contractors, Manchester.
- Dudley Vernam Marchant, lately Commissionaire/Receptionist, British Celanese Ltd., Courtaulds, London.
- Georgina Scott Maxwell, Collector, Street Savings Groups, Cumbernauld, Glasgow.
- George James Mead, Messenger, Lord Chancellor's Department.
- Thomas Henry Mead, Works Technical Officer Grade II, Department of the Environment.
- John Medcalf, National Savings Street Group Collector, Bury, Lancashire.
- Edward Moley, Technical Assistant Grade III, Ministry of Agriculture for Northern Ireland.
- Frances Thomas Moore, Principal Keeper, Instructor of Lighthouse Keepers, Trinity House Lighthouse Service.
- William John Morgan, School Staff Instructor, Dulwich College Combined Cadet Force.
- Margaret Jane Morrison, Cleaner, Newcastle Employment Exchange, Department of Employment.
- William Christian Morrison, Public Service Vehicle Driver, Liverpool Corporation Buses.
- James Mulholland, Basketmaker and Fisherman, Lurgan, County Armagh.
- William George Norman, Transport Driver, British Broadcasting Corporation.
- Walter Ernest Oldfield, Experimental Worker III, Safety in Mines Research Establishment, Buxton.
- Alfred Reginald Oliver, for services to the Bridgnorth Boys' Club.
- John Vallance Orr, Sergeant, Metropolitan Police.
- Oswald Oughton, lately Chargehand Electrical Fitter, Coventry Power Station, Midlands Region, Central Electricity Generating Board.
- Edward Richard Over, Staff Leading Hand, Allen West—EAC Ltd, Brighton.
- Richard George Overy, Assistant Administrative Instructor, Territorial Army and Volunteer Reserve Centre, Chard, Somerset.
- Henry Thomas Pallister, Constable, Hampshire Special Constabulary.
- Constance Pank, County Clothing Organiser, Oxfordshire, Women's Royal Voluntary Service.
- Amy Elizabeth Park. For services to the Girl Guide movement in Hawkshead, Westmorland.
- John Parnaby, Outside Assistant, Agricultural Development and Advisory Service, East Riding of Yorkshire.
- James Phillips, Packer, Westinghouse Brake & Signal Co. Ltd., Chippenham, Wiltshire. For services to Export.
- William Thomas David Phillips, Feeder, Coil Temper Mill, Port Talbot Works, Strip Mills Division, British Steel Corporation.
- Arthur John Pinchin, Driver, HM Borstal, Huntercombe.
- Edmond Piper, Technical Assistant Grade II, Department of the Environment.
- Edwin George Plowman, Storekeeper Grade I, Ordnance Survey.
- Dennis John Pummell, Fitter, Molins Group, Deptford Works.
- Henry William Ranson, Head Horse-keeper and Stud Groom, Young & Company's Brewery Ltd., London, S.W.8.
- Harry Ronald Read, Technical Supervisor, HM Dockyard, Devonport, Ministry of Defence.
- Louisa Ada Read, Counter Assistant, Government Canteen, Southbridge House, London.
- Brinley Richards, Foreman, Land Drainage Works, South West Wales River Authority.
- Patrick James Riley, Ship Electrician, Cammell Laird & Co. (Shipbuilders & Engineers) Ltd., Birkenhead.
- Reginald Thomas Ringer, Foreman, Cardigan Mercantile Co. Ltd., Builders Merchants, Cardigan.
- Alfongs Franz Rinning, Relieving Donkeyman, Ben Line Steamers.
- Henry Ross, Medical Orderly, Newcastle-upon-Tyne, Northern Gas Board.
- Stanley Wilfred Edward Salter, Supervisory Foreman Grade "A", Plymouth Friary, Western Region, British Railways Board.
- Hugh Sanderson, Watcher, Board of Customs and Excise.
- Derek Scarlett, Foreman (Operations), Longannet Power Station, South of Scotland Electricity Board.
- Richard James Scorey, Technical Class Grade II, Reactor Group, Winfrith, United Kingdom Atomic Energy Authority.
- William Henry Scott, Motor Transport Driver, Royal Naval Air Station, Culdrose, Helston, Cornwall, Ministry of Defence.
- Albert Percy Sicklen, Inspector, Western District Office, London Postal Region, Post Office.
- Thomas Skutt, Services Superintendent, Plessey Telecommunications Co. Ltd.
- Peter Smith, Coxswain, Bembridge, Isle of Wight Lifeboat, Royal National Lifeboat Institution.
- Jose Soleci, Assistant Foreman of Stores, Gibraltar, Ministry of Defence.
- Douglas Cecil Stanley, Technical Officer Grade III, Defence Communications Centre, Ministry of Defence.
- Henry Alfred Tanner, Leading Draughtsman, Royal Ordnance Factory, Cardiff, Ministry of Defence.
- William Augustus Taylor, Caretaker, Charlestown Junior and Infant Schools, Manchester.
- David Cyril Thomas, lately Inspector, Metropolitan Police.
- Dilys Thomas, Chargehand/Switch, Division, AB Electronic Components Ltd., Abercynon, Mountain Ash, Glamorgan. For services to Export.
- Joseph Thomas, lately Head Messenger, Royal Air Force, Stafford, Ministry of Defence.
- Philip James Thomas, lately Sample Passer, Lackenby Works, General Steels Division, British Steel Corporation.
- Frederick George Tracey, Leading Store-keeper, HM S. Lochinvar, Ministry of Defence.
- Frank Richard Utting, Craft Training Instructor, Transformer Division, Brush Electrical Engineering Co. Ltd., Loughborough, Leicester.
- Ann Louise Vaughan, Cook in Charge, Ely Ear, Nose and Throat Hospital, Cardiff.
- Joseph Thomas Walker, Driver (Footplate), Crewe, London Midland Region, British Railways Board.
- Olive May Walton, Nursing Assistant, Stanley Hospital, Ulverston, Lancashire.
- Frederick Watkins, Deputy Commandant, Teesside Special Constabulary.
- George William Ernest Watkins, Relief Signalman, Special Class, Divisional Manager's Office (South Eastern Division), Southern Region, Beckenham, British Railways Board.
- Emma Webb, Assistant Group Officer, Warley Fire Brigade.
- Reginald Philip Webb, Master, Port Auxiliary Service, HM Mooring and Salvage Depot, Pembroke Dock, Ministry of Defence.
- Thomas Webster, Foreman, City Engineer's Direct Labour Force, Newcastle-upon-Tyne County Borough Council.
- Alice Whalley, Divisional Superintendent, Poulton-le-Fylde Nursing Division, Duke of Lancaster's District, St. John Ambulance Association and Brigade.
- James Wight, Farm Manager, Department of Agriculture and Fisheries for Scotland.
- Enid Williams, Home Help, London Borough of Southwark.
- Edward Winch, Shift Manager, Gainsborough Cornard Ltd.
- Gladys Winter, Member, Cardiff County Borough, Women's Royal Voluntary Service.
- Frederick Darrell Wise, Storekeeper, Metropolitan Police Office.
- Walter Arthur Wood, lately Messenger/Handyman, British Council Area Office, Liverpool.
- Walter Frederick Woods, lately State Enrolled Nurse, Broadmoor Hospital.
- Peter Wormell, Chief Warden, Nature Conservancy, Isle of Rhum, Inverness-shire.

Overseas Territories

- Nesbit Emmanual Antoine, Supervisor of Credit Unions and Schools Saving Unions, Grenada.
- Hilton John, Head Gardener, Government House, St. Lucia.
- Iu-lam Li, Clerk Class I, Social Welfare Department, Hong Kong.
- Leighton Tamar, Water Supervisor, Central Water Commission, Grenada.
- Tireta Toromon, Junior Sister, Medical Department, Gilbert and Ellice Islands Colony.

Australian States
State of New South Wales

- May Elizabeth Bishop. For services to the community.
- William Patrick Buckley. For services to the community in Lismore.
- Irene Mary Conn. For services to the community in Jerilderie.
- Robert Cox. For services to the community in Newcastle.
- Sarah Elizabeth Deane. For services to nursing.
- Henrietta Adolphine Emma Dickson. For services to the community in Coonaborabran.
- Elsie Jean Dowsett. For services to the blind.
- Leslie Gibbs. For services to the community in Newcastle.
- Christina May Gollan. For services to the community in Wengham.
- Alderman Charles Robert Halliday. For services to local government.
- David Loughnan Jones. For services to the community in Coonaborabran.
- Jack William Mahony, lately Senior Weight of Loads Inspector, Department of Main Roads.
- James Sandry Matthews. For services to local government.
- John Wilson Morley. For services to the community, in Tweed Heads.
- Olive May Gates. For services to nursing.
- Dudley Gilbert Page. For services to the community.
- Henry Alexander Samuels. For services to the community.
- John Winhaven Yeaman, lately City Engineer, Blue Mountains City Council.

State of Victoria

- Ruby Emma Allan. For services to the community in Marborough.
- Walter Charles Baldwin, MM, House Manager, Bogong Lodge.
- Arthur Cecil Cook. For services to ex-Servicemen in Mitcham.
- Albert Norman Craig. For services to youth and the community in East Brighton.
- Merle Gladys Geard. For services as Social Secretary to the Victoria Racing Club.
- Arthur David Giles. For public service and service to the community of Stawell.
- Jean Adelaide Gorrie. For services to Scouting and the community in Glenroy.
- Thomas Rae Grant. For services to youth in Bentleigh.
- David William Charles Jones. For services to youth and the community in Williamstown.
- Joan Edith Jones. For services to the community in Wonthaggi.
- Harold Bertram Lamb. For services to youth and sport in Camperdown.
- William Rutledge Lawson. For services to ex-Servicemen in Ringwood.
- Arthur Lock. For services to the community in Wodonga.
- Thomas Emil Milburn. For services to ex-Servicemen and the community in Hamoton.
- Violet Tivey. For services to the community in Toorak.
- Lillian Edith Wheal. For services to the community in Colac.

State of Queensland

- Leslie James Bardwell, Inspector, Queensland Police Force. For services as leader of the Police Emergency Squad.
- Elsie Mary Stanley. For public service in Brisbane.

=== Royal Red Cross (RRC) ===
- Major Mary Noonan, MBE, (386120), Queen Alexandra's Royal Army Nursing Corps.
- Colonel Margaret Pratt, ARRC, (209058), Queen Alexandra's Royal Army Nursing Corps.

==== Associate of the Royal Red Cross (ARRC) ====
Royal Navy

- Isobel Rutherford Ovens, Superintending Sister, Queen Alexandra's Royal Naval Nursing Service.
- Winifred Hazel Fairhurst, Head Naval Nurse, Queen Alexandra's Royal Naval Nursing Service.

Army

- Major Joan Mimi Battersby (435065), Queen Alexandra's Royal Army Nursing Corps.
- Lieutenant-Colonel Rose Ann McQueen TD, (313161), Queen Alexandra's Royal Army Nursing Corps, Territorial and Army Volunteer Reserve, now retired.
- Major Phyllis Lila Nancy Walker (378340), Queen Alexandra's Royal Army Nursing Corps.

Royal Air Force

- Squadron Officer Irene Ritchie Carmichael (407692), Princess Mary's Royal Air Force Nursing Service.
- Squadron Officer Beryl Margaret Alice Johns (406491), Princess Mary's Royal Air Force Nursing Service.
- Flight Officer Constance Patricia Irene Bull (408213), Princess Mary's Royal Air Force Nursing Service.

=== Air Force Cross (AFC) ===
Royal Air Force

- Wing Commander Richard Arthur Pendry (2237951).
- Squadron Leader Henry Arthur William Drew (4230447).
- Squadron Leader David James Goy Foster (2591690).
- Squadron Leader Ian Henderson (607709).
- Squadron Leader John Telford Scott Lewis (607756).
- Squadron Leader Peter James Maitland (607950).
- Squadron Leader Douglas Stuart Balfour Marr (2617935).
- Squadron Leader Victor Julius Nickson (3510037).
- Squadron Leader Malcolm John Webber (2617866).
- Flight Lieutenant Heinz Erwin Frick (4230680).
- Flight Lieutenant Arnold Bert Thompson (4047115).

==== Bar to Air Force Cross ====
- Wing Commander Kenneth William Hayr, AFC, (607636).
- Wing Commander Ian Haig Keppie, AFC, (607421).
- Wing Commander Ivan Raymond Martin, AFC, (4055743).

=== Queen's Commendation for Valuable Service in the Air ===
Royal Navy

- Lieutenant Christopher Aubrey Wheal.

Royal Air Force

- Wing Commander Ronald Ian Stuart-Paul, MBE, (607586).
- Squadron Leader Terence Henry Bollans (3512745).
- Squadron Leader Geoffrey Ernest Bowles (4082611).
- Squadron Leader Colin Campbell (4094025).
- Squadron Leader Richard Barham Crowder (607888).
- Squadron Leader Keith Owen Harding (4220028).
- Squadron Leader Roy Herbert Holmes (6Q7948).
- Squadron Leader Brian Conrad Johnson (607987).
- Squadron Leader Iain Graham Porteous (3136222).
- Squadron Leader Ronald Walter James Scarlett (174084).
- Squadron Leader Jeremy John Seavers (2767579).
- Squadron Leader Leonard James Stanley Whiteight (1314639).
- Squadron Leader Nigel Roy Wootton Whitling (4174046).
- Flight Lieutenant Ernest Leslie Banfield (2500837).
- Flight Lieutenant Alan Brindle, AFC, (2205949).
- Flight Lieutenant David Constantino Coldicutt (4231208).
- Flight Lieutenant Thomas Jack Fairbrass (194282).
- Flight Lieutenant John Longhurst (4078747).
- Flight Lieutenant Alexander Kenneth McLean (4128657).
- Flight Lieutenant Joseph Robert Nesbitt (2454859).
- Flight Lieutenant William Herbert Rowley (2514703).
- Flight Lieutenant Alan John Sheppard (607969).
- Flight Lieutenant John Anthony Ward (4231375).
- Master Navigator Robert Henry Law (A1803674).
- Master Air Electronics Operator Sean Thomas Ward (C1798716).
- Master Signaller Gordon Richard Cox (G1921630).

United Kingdom

- Joan Crane, Chief Stewardess, British European Airways.
- Leonard Frederick James Holdstock, Flight Manager, Training, British European Airways.
- William Joseph Johnson, Flight Purser, British Overseas Airways Corporation.
- Kenneth John Loveless, DFC, Senior Captain First Class, British Overseas Airways Corporation.
- Charles Darwen Stenner, DSO, DFC, Airline Captain, Donaldson International Airways.

=== Queen's Police Medal (QPM) ===
England and Wales

- Hedley Joyce Phillips, Deputy Chief Constable, Hampshire Constabulary.
- Charles Gordon Taylor, Deputy Chief Constable, Norfolk Joint Police.
- John Alastair Rennie, Assistant Chief Constable, Cheshire Constabulary.
- Robert Henry Smith, Assistant Chief Constable, Thames Valley Police.
- John William Moody, Assistant Chief Constable, Lancashire Constabulary.
- Matthew Hunt, Chief Superintendent, Teesside Constabulary.
- William Hart Brown, Commander, Metropolitan Police.
- Frederick William Kenneth Hanson, Commander, Metropolitan Police.
- Philip John Nichols, Chief Superintendent, Warwickshire and Coventry Constabulary.
- John James Marshall, Chief Superintendent, Sussex Constabulary.
- John Edward O'Connell, Commander, Metropolitan Police.
- Frank Lombe Bunn, lately Chief Superintendent, Hertfordshire Constabulary.
- Shirley Cameron Becke, Commander, Metropolitan Police.
- Jean Margaret Graveling, Chief Superintendent, West Yorkshire Constabulary.
- Cyril Edward Heap, Assistant Chief Constable, City of Bradford Police.

Scotland

- John Graham Gillies, Assistant Chief Constable and Deputy Chief Constable, Renfrew and Bute Constabulary.
- William Stanley Pringle, Chief Superintendent, City of Edinburgh Police Force.

Northern Ireland

- John Joseph Garvey, Chief Inspector, Royal Ulster Constabulary.

State of Victoria

- Murray Comrie, Superintendent, Grade II, Victoria Police Force.
- John Harrison, Superintendent, Grade I, Victoria Police Force.
- John McPartland, Superintendent, Grade II, Victoria Police Force.
- Donald Stewart Ritchie, Inspector, Victoria Police Force.
- Bryan William Traynor, Inspector, Victoria Police Force.
- Frederick William Woonton, Chief Inspector, Victoria Police Force.

State of Queensland

- Herbert Ernest Sprenger, Inspector, Queensland Police Force.

State of South Australia

- Bruce Furler, Inspector, 2nd Class, South Australia Police Force.
- Sidney William Shepherdson, Inspector, 2nd Class, South Australia Police Force.

State of Tasmania

- Sydney John Fisher, Inspector, Tasmania Police Force.
- Thomas Edward Howard, Tasmania Police Force.

Nigeria

- Inspector Frank Nunn, Chief Superintendent, Nigeria Police.

Overseas Territories

- John Peter Law, Assistant Commissioner, Royal Hong Kong Police Force.
- William Duncan Maclean, Special Adviser to Commissioner of Police, Royal Bahamas Police Force.
- Albert Edward Shave, Chief Superintendent, Royal Hong Kong Police Force.

=== Queen's Fire Services Medal (QFSM) ===
England and Wales

- Frederick George Lapthorn, Divisional Officer, Grade I, London Fire Brigade.
- Roger Willey, Assistant Divisional Officer, London Fire Brigade.
- Frank Marshall Longbone, Chief Officer, Kingston upon Hull Fire Brigade.
- Fred Stephenson, Chief Officer, North Riding of Yorkshire Fire Brigade.

Northern Ireland

- George Henry Murphy, OBE, Fire Force Commander, Northern Ireland Fire Authority.

State of Western Australia

- Cyril Richard Harvey, Assistant Chief Officer, Western Australian Fire Brigades Board.
- William Albert Moylan, Chief Officer, Western Australian Fire Brigades Board.

Overseas Territories

- Maurice Kenneth Lane, Chief Fire Officer, Hong Kong Fire Services.
- Herbert Thomas John Hutchins, Chief Fire Officer, Hong Kong Fire Services.

=== Colonial Police Medal (CPM) ===
Overseas Territories

- Innocent Belmar, Sergeant (Acting Inspector), Royal Grenada Police Force.
- Chan Kwan, Station Officer, Hong Kong Fire Services.
- Chan Young, Assistant Divisional Officer, Hong Kong Fire Services.
- Cheng Chik-shin, Superintendent, Royal Hong Kong Police Force.
- Kenneth Peter Clark, Superintendent, Royal Hong Kong Police Force.
- Cyril Wilford Christian, Assistant Superintendent, Royal Antigua Police Force.
- Antonio Maria Da Costa, Assistant Superintendent, Royal Hong Kong Auxiliary Police Force.
- Michael Edward Davis, Superintendent, Royal Hong Kong Police Force.
- Ahmed Din, Sergeant, Royal Hong Kong Police Force.
- Hugh Donald Felix, Assistant Inspector, British Honduras Police Force.
- Charles Arthur Harris, Divisional Officer, Hamilton Fire Brigade, Bermuda.
- Harold William Alfred Harris, Chief Inspector, Royal Hong Kong Police Force.
- Wilfred Benjamin Kiriau, Assistant Superintendent, Solomon Islands Police Force.
- Lai Choi, Leading Fireman, Hong Kong Fire Services.
- William George Lawrence, Superintendent, Royal Hong Kong Police Force.
- Lee Fook, Principal Fireman, Hong Kong Fire Services.
- Ernest Lima, Sergeant, Gibraltar Police Force.
- Lawrence Whitfield Major, Superintendent, Royal Bahamas Police Force.
- Dennis George Neal, Senior Inspector, Royal Hong Kong Auxiliary Police Force.
- Claude Page, Superintendent, Royal Hong Kong Police Force.
- U Tat-ming, Superintendent, Royal Hong Kong Police Force.
- Harry Norman Whiteley, Superintendent, Royal Hong Kong Police Force.
- Maurice Williamson, Superintendent, Royal Hong Kong Police Force.
- Wong Yu-fong, Senior Fireman, Hong Kong Fire Services.

== Australia ==
=== Order of the Companions of Honour (CH) ===
- The Right Honourable William McMahon, MP, Prime Minister of Australia.

=== Knight Bachelor ===
- Alexis Francois Albert, CMG, VRD, of Vaucluse, New South Wales. For distinguished services to industry and the community.
- Hugh Gerner Brain, CBE, MSM, of Elsternwick, Victoria. For distinguished service to industry and the community.
- Allan Robert Callaghan, CMG, of South Yarra, Victoria. For distinguished service to the rural industry and to government.
- Sydney Henry Randal Heymanson, CBE, of New York City, New York, USA. For distinguished service to international relations.
- The Honourable Mr. Justice John Angus Nimmo, CBE, of North Balwyn, Victoria. For distinguished services to law and government.
- Professor Rutherford Ness Robertson, CMG, President of the Australian Academy of Science. For distinguished service to science and education.
- Thomas A'Beckett Travers, MB, BS, Ophthalmologist, Royal Melbourne Hospital. For distinguished services to medicine.
- Winton George Turnbull, CBE, MP, of Boort, Victoria. For distinguished political and public services.
- Alan George Turner, CBE, Clerk of the House of Representatives. For distinguished public service.

=== Order of the Bath ===
==== Companion of the Order of the Bath (CB) ====
Military Division

- Major-General Timothy Frederick Cape, CBE, DSO, (381), Australian Staff Corps, Master General of Ordnance.

=== Order of Saint Michael and Saint George ===
==== Companion of the Order of St Michael and St George (CMG) ====
- Joan Hood Hammond, CBE, of Aireys Inlet, Victoria. For her encouragement to young opera singers.
- The Reverend James Frederick McKay, OBE, of Northbridge, New South Wales, Moderator-General of the Presbyterian Church of Australia. For services to the church and the community in remote areas.
- Emeritus Professor William Edward Hanley Stanner, of Forrest, Australian Capital Territory. For services to the Aboriginal community and government.

=== Order of the British Empire ===
==== Dame Commander of the Order of the British Empire (DBE) ====
Civil Division

- Senator Nancy Eileen Buttfield, of Medindie, South Australia. For distinguished political and public services.

==== Knight Commander of the Order of the British Empire (KBE) ====
Military Division

- Vice-Admiral Richard Innes Peek, CB, OBE, DSC, Royal Australian Navy, Chief of Naval Staff.

Civil Division

- Senator The Honourable Sir Kenneth McColl Anderson, Minister for Health and Leader of the Government in the Senate.
- John Grant Phillips, CBE, of Mosman, New South Wales. For long and distinguished services to banking.

==== Commander of the Order of the British Empire (CBE) ====
Military Division

Royal Australian Navy

- Rear Admiral Anthony Monckton Synnot, Royal Australian Navy, Deputy Chief of Naval Staff.

Australian Military Forces

- Brigadier William John Morrow, OBE, (3314), Australian Staff Corps, Commander, Australian Army Force in Far East Land Forces.

Royal Australian Air Force

- Air Vice-Marshal Ronald Thomas Susans, DSO, DFC, (04391), Royal Australian Air Force, Commander, Integrated Air Defence System.

Civil Division

- Muriel Alice, Lady Berryman, of Point Piper, New South Wales. For services to charitable organisations.
- Alan Sydenham Cooley, of Campbell, Australian Capital Territory. Chairman, Public Service Board.
- Nigel Drury, MP, of Toowong, Queensland. For political and public services.
- Keith William Edwards, OBE, of Mosman Park, Western Australia. For services to the rural and transport industries.
- Edmund Maxwell Cameron Fox, MP, of Bentleigh East, Victoria. For political and public services.
- Charles David Griffin, of Killara, New South Wales. For services to industry.
- Leslie Herbert Irwin, MBE, MP, of Blacktown, New South Wales. For services to politics and the community.
- James Charles McNeill, of Canterbury, Victoria. For services to industry.
- John Gardiner Wilson, OBE, of Armadale, Victoria. For services to industry.

==== Officer of the Order of the British Empire (OBE) ====
Military Division

Royal Australian Navy

- Captain Ian Malcolm Burnside.
- Commander John Louis Euston.

Australian Military Forces

- Colonel John Ewens Noble, ED, (250430), Royal Australian Dental Corps.
- Colonel John Hancock Studdert (2306), Australian Staff Corps.
- Colonel John Irvine Williamson (1112), Australian Staff Corps.

Royal Australian Air Force

- Group Captain Howard Valentine Gavin, DFC, (06131).
- Wing Commander Albert Robert Jans (03516).
- Group Captain Eric Hay Stephenson (0312182).

Civil Division

- Charles Josef Berg, of Darling Point, New South Wales. For services to music and the theatre.
- Albert Guthrie Brayne, of Hamilton, Queensland. For services to ex-servicemen and women.
- Sidney William Caffin, Commonwealth Actuary and Insurance Commissioner.
- Patrick Carroll, of Fannie Bay, Northern Territory. For services to industrial relations.
- The Reverend Percy Chatterton, MHA, of Port Moresby, Territory of Papua and New Guinea. For community and political services.
- Neil Smith Currie, Secretary, Department of Supply.
- Lawrence John Daniels, First Assistant Director-General, Department of Health.
- Leslie Dodd, Deputy Director General of Education, South Australia. For services to education and to Aborigines.
- Emeritus Professor Howard Carlyle Forster, of North Balwyn, Victoria. For services to international relations.
- William Thorpe Gleeson, First Assistant Commissioner, Public Service Board.
- Kenneth George Hall, of Bellevue Hill, New South Wales. For services to the Australian motion picture industry.
- Clement Henry Darold Harper, MC, of Woollahra, New South Wales. For services to government and engineering.
- Leonard Michael Harris, First Assistant Director-General, Postmaster-General's Department.
- Noel Harry Hearn, of Swanbourne, Western Australia. For services to industry.
- John Aikman Hetherington, of Malvern, Victoria. For services to Australian literature.
- Jack Landon Hodgkinson, of Yass, New South Wales. For services to primary industry and the community.
- Myer Kangan, First Assistant Secretary, Department of Labour and National Service.
- Nelson Henry Mack, of Linley Point, New South Wales. For assistance to the footwear industry and to government.
- Alec Masel, of Toorak, Victoria. For services to the community and especially to Australian Jewry.
- Harry Clive Minnett, Senior Principal Research Officer, Commonwealth Scientific and Industrial Research Organisation.
- Beryl Nashar, Head, Department of Geology, University of Newcastle, New South Wales. For services to education and international relations.
- Captain Theodore Eric Nave, Royal Navy (Retired), of Brighton, Victoria. For services to ex-servicemen.
- Nizza Laura Omay, of Kenwick, Western Australia. For services to the community.
- Albert Thomas Read, of Vaucluse, New South Wales. For services to servicemen.
- Alderman Frederick Harold Reed, MBE, of Burwood, New South Wales. For services to the community and local government.
- George Christison Sautelle, of Garran, Australian Capital Territory. For services to the community.
- John Forbes Wakefield, of Ascot, Queensland. For services to journalism.
- Marilyn Welch (Miss Marilyn Jones), of Carlton, Victoria. For services to Australian ballet.
- Noelene June Wheeler, of Ashgrove, Queensland. For services to the community.
- Robert James Whitelaw, First Assistant Secretary, Department of the Treasury.

==== Member of the Order of the British Empire (MBE) ====
Military Division

Royal Australian Navy

- Lieutenant Commander John James Johnson, RAN Emergency List.

Australian Military Forces

- Warrant Officer Class I Maurice William Nelson Armstrong (2900574), Royal Australian Infantry Corps.
- Warrant Officer Class II Ronald Stanley Baxter (6319), Australian Army Aviation Corps.
- Major Ian David Bayles (6526), Royal Australian Army Education Corps.
- Major Urban William Madden (2239), Royal Australian Corps of Signals.
- Warrant Officer Class I Robert Leslie Martin (125007), Royal Australian Electrical and Mechanical Engineers.
- Major Kennedy Maxwell Morrison (237597), Royal Australian Ordnance Corps.
- Warrant Officer Class II Ronald Percy Pincott (22907), Royal Australian Infantry Corps.
- Major William Neville Reynolds, ED, (382578), Royal Australian Infantry Corps.
- Major Bert Zealandous Riddell, ED, (3905023), Royal Corps Australian Electrical and Mechanical Engineers.
- Chaplain (Third Class) Erich Otmar Riedel (43762), Royal Australian Army Chaplains' Department.
- Warrant Officer Class I Leonard Wildman (21520), Royal Australian Artillery Corps.

Royal Australian Air Force

- Warrant Officer George Alexander Dennis (A11057).
- Squadron Leader John Stanley Roe (02431).
- Flight Lieutenant Ian Granville Rourke (055671).
- Warrant Officer William Ronald Walters (A31912).

Civil Division

- Gwen Adamson, of Epping, New South Wales. For services to the community.
- Keith William Arscott, of Forrest, Australian Capital Territory. For services to youth.
- Francis Herbert Spencer Balfour-Ogilvy, of Renmark, South Australia. For services to government.
- Herbert Ronald Herschel Beattie, MB, BS, of Tamworth, New South Wales. For services to the community.
- Bertha Beecroft, of City Beach, Western Australia. For services to the community.
- Dorothy Sara Berwick, of Hobart, Tasmania. For services to the community.
- Vincent Paul Bloink, of Kenmore, Queensland. Former Government Printer, Territory of Papua and New Guinea.
- Thomas Ewart Cadwallader, of Concord West, New South Wales. For services to the community.
- The Reverend Canon Ernest Cameron, of Dee Why, New South Wales. For services to the community in remote areas.
- Thomas Eric Canning, of Hobart, Tasmania. For services to dentistry.
- Harry Raymond Carter, of Quirindi, New South Wales. For services to local government and the community.
- Hubert Vincent Casey, Chief Migration Officer, Athens, Greece.
- Edith Clement, MB, ChM, of Turner, Australian Capital Territory. For services to infant welfare.
- Leonard James Collar, of Kempsey, New South Wales. District Telephone Manager, Postmaster-General's Department.
- Richard George Collins, Deputy Commissioner, Repatriation Commission.
- Vincent Louis Cornelius Dalton, of Launceston, Tasmania. For services to the community.
- John Llanover Davies, of Forrest, Australian Capital Territory. For services to pharmacy and to government.
- Warren Edwin Denning, of Woollahra, New South Wales. For public service.
- James Edward Dibble, of Balgowlah, New South Wales. For public service.
- Violet Grace Eperjesy, of Katherine, Northern Territory. For services to the Aboriginal community.
- George Maxwell Evans, of Mt. Claremont, Western Australia. For services to the community.
- Isabel Vera Gale, Brigadier, Salvation Army, of Armadale, Victoria. For community services and as founder of Red Shield Friendship Club.
- Gordon Wallace Gilmour, of Stafford, Queensland. For services to the community.
- Thora Amelia Lynn Godfrey, of Bourke, New South Wales. For services to the community in remote areas.
- Councillor John Herbert Gordon, of Tathra, New South Wales. For services to local government and the community.
- William Noel Hogan, of Whitton, New South Wales. For service to the rice growing industry.
- Harry Georges Holder, of Dianella, Western Australia. For services to ex-servicemen and women.
- Stanley James Hosie, of Lismore, New South Wales. For services to the community.
- Geoffrey Brian Hunt, of Mentone, Victoria. For services to sport and international relations.
- Richard Hugh Bell Kearns, of Broken Hill, New South Wales. For services to the community.
- Ronald Michael Keogh, former First Assistant Comptroller-General, Department of Customs and Excise.
- Norma King (Norma Tullo), of Toorak, Victoria. For services to industry and export.
- Joyce Mary Loch, of Ouranoupolis, Greece. For services to international relations.
- William Henry Louch, of Murrumbeena, Victoria. For services to the community.
- Noel Jack Lovell, Clerk, Government House, Canberra.
- Frederick James McCauley, of Dickson, Australian Capital Territory. For services to industrial relations and to government.
- Hugh Henry Martin, MB, BS, of Yarram, Victoria. For services to the community and for wildlife preservation.
- Eslyn Lindsay Fitzroy Murray, of New Farm, Queensland. Private Secretary to the Postmaster-General.
- Frank Narua, of Daru, Territory of Papua and New Guinea, former Senior Master of Administration vessels.
- Ada Frances Neilson, of Drummoyne, New South Wales. For services to the Red Cross.
- James Harold Pead, of Yarralumla, Australian Capital Territory. For services to the community.
- The Reverend Susannah Jane Rankin. For services to the people of Papua and New Guinea.
- May Julia Rawlings, of Blacktown, New South Wales. For services to nursing.
- Ernest Charles Edward Roberts, of Southgate, London N.14, Clerk, Australia House, London.
- Leonard Isaac Rose, of Hurstville, New South Wales. For services to the community.
- Frederick Raymond Schwinghammer, of Double Bay, New South Wales. For services to journalism and to government.
- Archibald John Shields, Regional Director, Queensland and Papua New Guinea, Bureau of Meteorology.
- Sydney Mervyn Stevens, of North Balwyn, Victoria. For services to youth.
- Lieutenant-Colonel Sidney Arthur Taplin, ED, (Retired), of Drummoyne, New South Wales. For service to the community and local government.
- Lionel William Dunn Taylor, Regional Controller New South Wales, Department of Shipping and Transport.
- Norah Wamgoahi, of Milne Bay District, Territory of Papua and New Guinea. For service to the community.
- William Weldon (The Reverend Brother Othmar), of Drummoyne, New South Wales. For services to education.

=== Companion of the Imperial Service Order (ISO) ===
- Raymond Charles Hutchinson, Defence Food Science Adviser, Department of the Army.
- George Arnold Jeffries, Assistant Director Engineering, Postmaster-General's Department.
- Frank Grahame Vidgen, of Ithaca, Queensland, Director of Works, Queensland.

=== British Empire Medal (BEM) ===
Military Division

Royal Australian Navy

- Sergeant Leslie James Bending (P35345), RAN Dockyard Police.
- Chief Petty Officer Writer Alexander George Goodieson (R47198).
- Leading Sick Berth Attendant Robert John McGinley (R64120).
- Chief Systems Artificer Harold Owen (A46590).
- Chief Radio Supervisor Edward Pretty (R30223).
- Leading Airmen Gordon Albert Walter (R46833).

Australian Military Forces

- Staff Sergeant Raymond Ashley Cooper (610233), Royal Australian Army Medical Corps.
- Staff Sergeant (Temporary Warrant Officer Class II) Ronald Gildersleeve (22861), Royal Australian Infantry Corps.
- Sergeant Kingme-Homin (81191), Royal Australian Infantry Corps.
- Staff Sergeant Lance McPherson (25164), Royal Australian Infantry Corps.
- Corporal Cecil Arthur Parkes (14877), Royal Australian Infantry Corps.
- Staff Sergeant Roy Walter Reader (310339), Royal Australian Infantry Corps.
- Staff Sergeant (Temporary Warrant Officer Class II) Donald Sydney White (22870), Royal Australian Infantry Corps.

Royal Australian Air Force

- Flight Sergeant John Greer (A12765).
- Sergeant Alexander Anthony McLeod (A219492).
- Sergeant Stanley Eric Power (A17046).
- Sergeant Ray John Seibel (A15665).

Civil Division

- Latimer Richard Allen, of Hurstville, New South Wales. For services to the community.
- William Frederick Victor Anderson, MM, of West Tamworth, New South Wales. For services to ex-servicemen.
- Cecil Richard Andrew, of Balgowlah, New South Wales. Former Postmaster, Manly.
- Nellie Alicia Baillie, of Chatswood, New South Wales. For services to the community.
- Reginald Leslie Black, of Broadview, South Australia. Postmaster.
- Lorna Harriett Burden, of Quorn, South Australia. For services to the community.
- Michael Burke, of Bronte, New South Wales. For services to the community.
- Paul Bridges Calanchini, of Rosebud West, Victoria. Former lightkeeper.
- Renny Maxwell Campbell, of Bankstown, New South Wales. For services to the community.
- Samuel William Chatfield, of Bentleigh, Victoria. For public service and service to industrial relations.
- Robert Bruce Clark, of Burwood, New South Wales. For services to the community.
- Peter Coffin, of Port Hedland, Western Australia. For services to the Aboriginal community.
- Matthew John Devlin, of Reservoir, Victoria. Senior Works Supervisor, Department of Works.
- Ronald Edward Dewhirst, of Booborowie, South Australia. For services to the community.
- Arthur George Duckett, of Kogarah, New South Wales. For public service.
- Winifred Kathleen Ellis, of Cremorne, New South Wales. For public service.
- Robert David Flude, of Montague Bay, Tasmania. Former Superior (Maritime Aids), Department of Shipping and Transport.
- Beatrice Frith, Laundress, Katherine Hospital, Northern Territory.
- Margaret Moy Galinbu, of Darwin, Northern Territory. For services to Aborigines.
- Frederick George Gardiner, Senior Telecommunications Technical Officer, Postmaster-General's Department.
- Sadie Aileen Ghent, of Neutral Bay, New South Wales. For public service.
- Stella Louise Gilbert, of East Melbourne, Victoria. Clerk, Commonwealth Scientific and Industrial Research Organisation.
- Vivienne Grace, of Hurstville, New South Wales. For services to scouting.
- Alice May Green, of Taree, New South Wales, Postmistress.
- Stuart Roy Hardman, Clerical Assistant, Parliamentary Library, Canberra.
- Lorna Jermyn, of Carnegie, Victoria. For services to the community.
- Ruby Maria Beadman Joyce, of Cronulla, New South Wales. For services to the community.
- Aubrey Shackelton Laidlaw, of North Bondi, New South Wales. For services to the community.
- Laiu-Komali, Sergeant Second Class, Royal Papua New Guinea Constabulary.
- Ivy Grace Lawson, of Subiaco, Western Australia. For services to the community.
- Florence McBurnie, of Blighty, New South Wales. For services to the community.
- Flora Marie Macdonald, of Port Kembla, New South Wales. For services to scouting.
- Thomas Henry McDonald, of Mullumbimby, New South Wales For services to ex-servicemen.
- Rita Winifred McGinty, of Castle Cove, New South Wales. For services to the community.
- Bernard Harold McLean, Officer in Charge, Casino Airport, New South Wales.
- Morgan Henry Mathias, of Hunter's Hill, New South Wales. For services to Welsh immigrants.
- Robert Edward Maughan, Administrative Officer, Regional Office, Department of Supply, Sydney.
- Vincent Cyril Mulligan, of Nanga Range, New South Wales. For public and community service.
- Stanley John Thomas Noble, of Parkes, New South Wales. For services to ex-servicemen and their dependants.
- Jacob Oberdoo, of Port Hedland, Western Australia. For services to Aborigines. This award was rejected.
- Grace Reudavey, of Capel, Western Australia. For services to the community.
- Charles John Ridd, Head Messenger, Reserve Bank, Sydney.
- Ida Gwen Roberts, of Mt. Lawley, Western Australia. For services to music.
- Leslie Joseph Savage, ED, of Carnegie, Victoria. Clerk, the Department of the Army.
- Elsie Scott, of Coogee, New South Wales. For services to the community.
- Phillip Bert Sheedy, of Narrabundah, Australian Capital Territory. For his contribution to historical studies of the Australian Capital Territory.
- John Harris Simon, of Toowoomba West, Queensland. For his services to scouting.
- Eileen Francis Stewart, of Camberwell, Victoria. For public service.
- Myfanwy Lydia Sullivan, of Ipswich, Queensland. For services to the community.
- Dawn Mabel Tasker, of Umina, New South Wales. For services to spastic children.
- Olga Louise Thurgar, of Scone, New South Wales. For services to the community.
- Alfred Vockler, of Watson's Bay, New South Wales. For services to sport and the community.
- Essie Whitehouse, of West Ryde, New South Wales. For services to the community.

=== Royal Red Cross (RRC) ===
- Colonel Perditta Marjorie McCarthy, ARRC, (F22), Royal Australian Army Nursing Corps.

==== Associate of the Royal Red Cross (ARRC) ====
- Matron Patricia Catherine Vines, Royal Australian Navy Nursing Service.
- Lieutenant Colonel Ruby Frances Cox (F36), Royal Australian Army Nursing Corps.

=== Air Force Cross (AFC) ===
Royal Australian Air Force

- Flight Lieutenant John Albert Landale (0223102).
- Squadron Leader Brian Laurence Morgan (0313132).
- Squadron Leader Kevin Newton Pyke (055481).
- Squadron Leader James Alfred Treadwell (037600).

=== Queen's Commendation for Valuable Service in the Air ===
Royal Australian Air Force

- Flight Lieutenant David Thomas Bowden (017558).
- Sergeant Maxwell Bruce Goddard (A310150).
- Flight Lieutenant Desmond Robert Lovett (0220978).
- Flight Lieutenant Ronald James Magrath (0221795).
- Sergeant Francis O'Brien (A16994).
- Squadron Leader Robert Charles Thompson (033757).
- Squadron Leader Richard Alfred Waterfield (014233).

=== Queen's Police Medal (QPM) ===
- James Dutton, Superintendent, Royal Papua New Guinea Constabulary.
- Leonard Sydney Harper, Deputy Commissioner, Commonwealth of Australia Police Force.
- William Grenfell Sweeny, Superintendent, Commonwealth of Australia Police Force.

== Barbados ==
=== Order of the British Empire ===
==== Commander of the Order of the British Empire (CBE) ====
Civil Division

- The Honourable Kenmore Nathaniel Rhystone Husbands, lately Minister of Trade, Tourism, Community Development and Youth Affairs.
- The Reverend Deryck Maund Lyder. For services as leader of the Methodist Church in Barbados and as a Member of the Barbados Privy Council.
- Lloyd Ethelbert Smith. For services as a Member of the House of Assembly and in Local Government.

==== Officer of the Order of the British Empire (OBE) ====
Civil Division

- Gilbert Baldwin Brandford, Auditor-General.
- Ellsworth St. Aubyn Holder, lately Member of the House of Assembly.
- Eric Douglas Conrad Foderingham Inniss. For services to cricket and for public service.

==== Member of the Order of the British Empire (MBE) ====
Civil Division

- Harry Challenor Lynch Jones. For his contribution to horse-racing in the role of a jockey.
- Alfred Pragnell. For services to the cultural life of the community.
- Gwendolyn Gertrude Reader. For services to child welfare.

== Mauritius ==
=== Knight Bachelor ===
- Leckraz Teelock, CBE, MB, ChB, High Commissioner for Mauritius in London. For public services.
- Harold Edward Walter, Minister of Health. For political and public services.

=== Order of Saint Michael and Saint George ===
==== Companion of the Order of St Michael and St George (CMG) ====
- Joseph Jean Espitalier-Noel. For services to the sugar industry and the economy.

=== Order of the British Empire ===
==== Commander of the Order of the British Empire (CBE) ====
Civil Division

- Marie Evariste Jacques Ribet, QPM, lately Commissioner of Police. For long and meritorious service.
- Marie Joseph Andre Robert. For services to the legal profession and voluntary social work.

==== Officer of the Order of the British Empire (OBE) ====
Civil Division

- Somdath Bhuckory. For services to urban local government and literature.
- Louis Marcel Pierre Simonet. For public service and voluntary social work.

==== Member of the Order of the British Empire (MBE) ====
Civil Division

- Ismael Khoyratty, Chief Inspector, Municipality of Port Louis. For long and meritorious service.
- Runglall Ramsahye. For services to the Co-operative movement.

=== Queen's Police Medal (QPM) ===
- Joseph Paul Perrier, Deputy Commissioner, Mauritius Police Force.

== Fiji ==
=== Order of the British Empire ===
==== Commander of the Order of the British Empire (CBE) ====
Civil Division

- Semesa Koroikilai Sikivou, MBE, Permanent Representative of Fiji at the United Nations, Fiji Ambassador to the United States of America and Fiji High Commissioner to Canada.

==== Officer of the Order of the British Empire (OBE) ====
Civil Division

- Chandulal Churai, Medical Officer, Colonial War Memorial Hospital, Suva.
- David John Lancaster, MB, FRCOG, Obstetrics and Gynaecology Consultant, Colonial War Memorial Hospital, Suva.

==== Member of the Order of the British Empire (MBE) ====
Civil Division

- Vera Gibson. For services to the community.
- Ratu Meli Kuliniasi Salabogi, Roko Tui, Ra.
- James Shankar Singh. For public service and services to the community.

=== British Empire Medal (BEM) ===
Civil Division

- Carl Reiher, Leading Hand Boatbuilder, Marine Department.
