= List of United Kingdom locations: Cos-Cou =

The United Kingdom

This is part of the list of United Kingdom locations: a gazetteer of place names in the United Kingdom showing each place's locality and geographical coordinates.

== Co (continued) ==
=== Cos ===
Location	Locality	Coordinates (links to map & photo sources)	OS grid reference
Cosby	Leicestershire	52.55°N 01.20°W	SP5495
Coscote	Oxfordshire	51.58°N 01.26°W	SU5188
Coseley	Dudley	52.54°N 02.08°W	SO9494
Cosford	Warwickshire	52.40°N 01.28°W	SP4979
Cosgrove	Northamptonshire	52.07°N 00.84°W	SP7942
Cosham	City of Portsmouth	50.84°N 01.06°W	SU6605
Coshandrochaid	Argyll and Bute	55.97°N 05.68°W	NR7082
Cosheston	Pembrokeshire	51.69°N 04.89°W	SN0003
Cosmeston	The Vale Of Glamorgan	51.41°N 03.18°W	ST1869
Cosmore	Dorset	50.84°N 02.47°W	ST6705
Cossall	Nottinghamshire	52.97°N 01.28°W	SK4842
Cossall Marsh	Nottinghamshire	52.97°N 01.28°W	SK4842
Cossington	Somerset	51.15°N 02.93°W	ST3540
Cossington	Leicestershire	52.71°N 01.11°W	SK6013
Costa	Orkney Islands	59.13°N 03.19°W	HY3228
Costessey	Norfolk	52.66°N 01.20°E	TG1712
Costessey Park	Norfolk	52.65°N 01.19°E	TG1611
Costhorpe	Nottinghamshire	53.36°N 01.12°W	SK5886
Costislost	Cornwall	50.49°N 04.79°W	SX0270
Costock	Nottinghamshire	52.82°N 01.15°W	SK5726
Coston	Norfolk	52.61°N 01.04°E	TG0606
Coston	Leicestershire	52.78°N 00.75°W	SK8422
Coswinsawsin	Cornwall	50.19°N 05.33°W	SW6238

=== Cot ===
Location	Locality	Coordinates (links to map & photo sources)	OS grid reference
Cote	Somerset	51.19°N 02.94°W	ST3444
Cote	West Sussex	50.83°N 00.42°W	TQ1105
Cote	Oxfordshire	51.71°N 01.49°W	SP3502
Cotebrook	Cheshire	53.18°N 02.64°W	SJ5765
Cotehill	Cumbria	54.84°N 02.84°W	NY4650
Cotes	Cumbria	54.26°N 02.79°W	SD4886
Cotes	Leicestershire	52.77°N 01.18°W	SK5520
Cotes	Staffordshire	52.90°N 02.23°W	SJ8434
Cotesbach	Leicestershire	52.43°N 01.22°W	SP5382
Cotes Heath	Staffordshire	52.90°N 02.25°W	SJ8334
Cotes Park	Derbyshire	53.08°N 01.37°W	SK4254
Cotford	Devon	50.72°N 03.21°W	SY1492
Cotford St Luke	Somerset	51.04°N 03.19°W	ST1727
Cotgrave	Nottinghamshire	52.90°N 01.04°W	SK6435
Cotham	City of Bristol	51.46°N 02.60°W	ST5874
Cotham	Nottinghamshire	53.01°N 00.82°W	SK7947
Cothelstone	Somerset	51.07°N 03.17°W	ST1831
Cotheridge	Worcestershire	52.18°N 02.32°W	SO7854
Cotherstone	Durham	54.56°N 01.98°W	NZ0119
Cothill	Oxfordshire	51.68°N 01.33°W	SU4699
Cotland	Monmouthshire	51.73°N 02.72°W	SO5004
Cotleigh	Devon	50.81°N 03.13°W	ST2002
Cotmanhay	Derbyshire	52.98°N 01.31°W	SK4643
Cotmarsh	Wiltshire	51.51°N 01.87°W	SU0979
Cotmaton	Devon	50.67°N 03.26°W	SY1187
Cotness	East Riding of Yorkshire	53.71°N 00.79°W	SE7924
Coton	Northamptonshire	52.33°N 01.01°W	SP6771
Coton	Cambridgeshire	52.20°N 00.04°E	TL4058
Coton	Shropshire	52.90°N 02.70°W	SJ5334
Coton (Tamworth)	Staffordshire	52.64°N 01.73°W	SK1805
Coton (Gnosall)	Staffordshire	52.77°N 02.28°W	SJ8120
Coton (Milwich)	Staffordshire	52.87°N 02.04°W	SJ9731
Coton Clanford	Staffordshire	52.80°N 02.19°W	SJ8723
Coton Hayes	Staffordshire	52.88°N 02.01°W	SJ9932
Coton Hill	Shropshire	52.71°N 02.77°W	SJ4813
Coton Hill	Staffordshire	52.88°N 02.03°W	SJ9832
Coton in the Clay	Staffordshire	52.85°N 01.76°W	SK1629
Coton in the Elms	Derbyshire	52.73°N 01.64°W	SK2415
Coton Park	Derbyshire	52.75°N 01.60°W	SK2717
Cotonwood	Shropshire	52.91°N 02.70°W	SJ5336
Cotonwood	Staffordshire	52.77°N 02.29°W	SJ8020
Cotswold Community	Wiltshire	51.65°N 01.95°W	SU0395
Cott	Devon	50.43°N 03.71°W	SX7861
Cottam	Lancashire	53.78°N 02.76°W	SD5032
Cottam	Nottinghamshire	53.30°N 00.78°W	SK8179
Cottenham	Cambridgeshire	52.28°N 00.12°E	TL4567
Cottenham Park	Kingston upon Thames	51.40°N 00.24°W	TQ2269
Cotterdale	North Yorkshire	54.33°N 02.26°W	SD8393
Cottered	Hertfordshire	51.94°N 00.09°W	TL3129
Cotterhill Woods	Rotherham	53.33°N 01.17°W	SK5582
Cotteridge	Birmingham	52.41°N 01.94°W	SP0480
Cotterstock	Northamptonshire	52.49°N 00.46°W	TL0490
Cottesbrooke	Northamptonshire	52.35°N 00.97°W	SP7073
Cottesmore	Rutland	52.70°N 00.66°W	SK9013
Cotteylands	Devon	50.89°N 03.50°W	SS9412
Cottingham	East Riding of Yorkshire	53.78°N 00.39°W	TA0633
Cottingham	Northamptonshire	52.50°N 00.76°W	SP8490
Cottingley	Bradford	53.82°N 01.83°W	SE1137
Cottingley	Leeds	53.77°N 01.58°W	SE2730
Cottisford	Oxfordshire	51.97°N 01.15°W	SP5831
Cotton	Staffordshire	53.01°N 01.91°W	SK0646
Cotton	Suffolk	52.26°N 01.01°E	TM0667
Cotton End	Bedfordshire	52.09°N 00.42°W	TL0845
Cotton End	Northamptonshire	52.22°N 00.90°W	SP7559
Cotton of Brighty	Angus	56.53°N 02.92°W	NO4338
Cotton of Gardyne	Angus	56.61°N 02.70°W	NO5747
Cotton Stones	Calderdale	53.68°N 01.97°W	SE0221
Cotton Tree	Lancashire	53.84°N 02.15°W	SD9039
Cottonworth	Hampshire	51.14°N 01.47°W	SU3739
Cottown	Aberdeenshire	57.45°N 02.30°W	NJ8240
Cottown	Perth and Kinross	56.37°N 03.29°W	NO2021
Cotts	Cornwall	50.46°N 04.21°W	SX4365
Cottwood	Devon	50.90°N 03.97°W	SS6114
Cotwall	Shropshire	52.74°N 02.59°W	SJ6017
Cotwalton	Staffordshire	52.90°N 02.12°W	SJ9234

=== Cou ===
Location	Locality	Coordinates (links to map & photo sources)	OS grid reference
Coubister	Orkney Islands	59.01°N 03.09°W	HY3715
Couch Green	Hampshire	51.08°N 01.25°W	SU5232
Couch's Mill	Cornwall	50.40°N 04.61°W	SX1459
Coughton	Herefordshire	51.88°N 02.59°W	SO5921
Coughton	Warwickshire	52.23°N 01.89°W	SP0760
Coughton Fields	Warwickshire	52.22°N 01.86°W	SP0959
Coulags	Highland	57.45°N 05.40°W	NG9645
Coulby Newham	Middlesbrough	54.51°N 01.22°W	NZ5014
Coulderton	Cumbria	54.46°N 03.57°W	NX9809
Coulin Lodge	Highland	57.55°N 05.34°W	NH0056
Coull	Aberdeenshire	57.10°N 02.81°W	NJ5102
Coulnacraggan	Highland	57.42°N 06.28°W	NG4345
Coul of Fairburn	Highland	57.54°N 04.55°W	NH4753
Coul Point	Argyll and Bute	55.79°N 06.47°W	NR194644
Coulport	Argyll and Bute	56.04°N 04.89°W	NS2087
Coulsdon	Croydon	51.30°N 00.13°W	TQ3058
Coulston	Wiltshire	51.28°N 02.07°W	ST9554
Coulter	South Lanarkshire	55.58°N 03.55°W	NT0233
Coultings	Somerset	51.16°N 03.11°W	ST2241
Coulton	North Yorkshire	54.15°N 01.03°W	SE6374
Cound	Shropshire	52.63°N 02.66°W	SJ5504
Coundlane	Shropshire	52.64°N 02.63°W	SJ5705
Coundmoor	Shropshire	52.61°N 02.66°W	SJ5502
Coundon	Coventry	52.42°N 01.54°W	SP3181
Coundon	Durham	54.65°N 01.62°W	NZ2429
Coundongate	Durham	54.65°N 01.66°W	NZ2229
Coundon Grange	Durham	54.64°N 01.66°W	NZ2228
Counters End	Hertfordshire	51.75°N 00.49°W	TL0407
Countersett	North Yorkshire	54.28°N 02.13°W	SD9188
Countess Cross	Essex	51.93°N 00.70°E	TL8630
Countess Wear	Devon	50.70°N 03.50°W	SX9490
Countesswells	City of Aberdeen	57.14°N 02.21°W	NJ872051
Countesthorpe	Leicestershire	52.55°N 01.14°W	SP5895
Countisbury	Devon	51.22°N 03.80°W	SS7449
Coupar Angus	Perth and Kinross	56.54°N 03.27°W	NO2240
Coupe Green	Lancashire	53.73°N 02.62°W	SD5927
Coupland	Cumbria	54.55°N 02.44°W	NY7118
Coupland	Northumberland	55.57°N 02.11°W	NT9331
Courance	Dumfries and Galloway	55.19°N 03.49°W	NY0590
Coursley	Somerset	51.09°N 03.22°W	ST1433
Court-at-Street	Kent	51.07°N 00.98°E	TR0935
Court Barton	Devon	50.65°N 03.65°W	SX8385
Court Colman	Bridgend	51.51°N 03.61°W	SS8881
Court Corner	Hampshire	51.32°N 01.14°W	SU6059
Courteachan	Highland	57.00°N 05.82°W	NM6897
Courteenhall	Northamptonshire	52.17°N 00.90°W	SP7553
Court Henry / Cwrt Henri	Carmarthenshire	51.87°N 04.10°W	SN5522
Court Hey	Liverpool	53.40°N 02.88°W	SJ4190
Court House Green	Coventry	52.42°N 01.48°W	SP3581
Court Orchard	Dorset	50.73°N 02.76°W	SY4693
Courtsend	Essex	51.59°N 00.91°E	TR0293
Courtway	Somerset	51.09°N 03.14°W	ST2033
Cousland	Midlothian	55.90°N 03.00°W	NT3768
Cousley Wood	East Sussex	51.07°N 00.35°E	TQ6533
