= Coates (surname) =

Coates is an English and Scottish surname.

== Origins ==
One origin is a locational name from any of several places in England, such as Coates in Cambridgeshire or Cotes in Leicestershire. There is also a locational name which was usually given to the lord of the manor at that place or to someone who moved from there to another village. The derivation is from the Old English pre 7th century cot or cote, meaning cottage or shelter.

Alternatively, Coates is a noble family of English and Scottish origin. The surname Coates, which originally is of Norman background, was first found in Staffordshire where the family are "descended from Sir Richard de Cotes, who was probably son of Thomas de Coates, living in 1157, when the Black Book of the Exchequer was compiled. At that time, he held large estates on the Salop, Staffordshire borders."

The name was written in early records as De Cote; the letter "a" occurs in the spelling as early as 1331, when in the fourth year of the reign of Edward III, William De Coates was Lord of Coles De Ville in Leicestershire and in 1347 John De Coates held lands in Lincolnshire. By 1273, the name was scattered throughout England as seen in the Hundredorum Rolls of that year: Egidius de Cotes, Norfolk; Robert de Cotes, Buckinghamshire; and Geoffrey de Cotes, Lincolnshire. Later, the Yorkshire Poll Tax Rolls of 1379 listed Thomas del Cotes; Johannes del Cotes; and Henricus del Cote as holding lands. The first Coates family arrived in Ireland in the early 1700s and bought land in Kildare around Donadea, Kilcock and Ovidstown from the Aylmer family, where they built their family estate at Knockanally. The first mention of the name in America is in 1638, when Sir John Coates came to Maryland and soon afterwards obtained the grant of a tract of land five miles from the city of Washington, part of which is still owned by descendants.

== Families ==
Bernard Burke's book Burke's Landed Gentry discusses one branch of this family: Coates of Combe House. It begins with a mention of Edward Coates, Esquire of Combe House in county Radnor who was Justice of the Peace and High Sheriff in 1866. This Coates Family Arms is blazoned as follows in heraldry: Gules, a greyhound statant within an orle of roses argent, with the crest being: Upon a mount vert a greyhound couchant argent collared and lined or, resting the dexter paw on a rose gules. Burke's other book, Burke's Peerage, discusses two branches of this family: Coates of Haypark and Milnes-Coates of Helperby Hall. The first begins with a mention of Sir Frederick Gregory Lindsay Coates, the 2nd Baronet, of Haypark, of the city of Belfast, who was a Major in the Royal Tank Regiment in World War II.

- Coates baronets, of Haypark, Belfast
- Milnes Coates baronets (formerly the Coates baronets), of Helperby Hall in Yorkshire

== A–G ==
- Albert Coates (musician) (1882–1953), English conductor and composer
- Al Coates (broadcaster), Canadian sports commentator
- Al Coates (ice hockey) (born 1945), National Hockey League executive
- Sir Albert Coates (surgeon) (1895–1977), Australian surgeon and soldier
- "Ann Coates" (derived from Ancoats), credited name for British singer Morrissey in the song "Bigmouth Strikes Again"
- Anne V. Coates (1926–2018), British-born American film editor
- Arnold Coates (1936–2013), English amateur footballer active in the 1960s
- Benjamin M. Coates (1819–1880), American politician and businessman
- Ben Coates (born 1969), American football player and coach
- Clarence L. "Ben" Coates (1923–2000), American computer scientist
- Colin Coates (born 1946), Australian ice speed skater
- Darcy Coates, Australian writer
- Delman Coates (born 1973), American pastor
- Denise Coates, (born 1967) , English businesswoman and billionaire
- Derek Coates (born 1972), English rugby union player
- David Coates (born 1956) British Expat in Hong Kong
- Sir Edward Coates, 1st Baronet (1853–1921), British politician and sportsman
- Elaine J. Coates (born 1937), first African American graduate of the University of Maryland
- Emma Coates (born 1991), English football player and manager
- Emily Coates (born 1994/1995), English actress
- Eric Coates (1886–1957), English composer
- Florence Van Leer Earle Coates (1850–1927), American poet and philanthropist
- Fred Coates (1879–1956), English footballer
- Geoffrey E. Coates (1917–2013), English chemist and academic
- Geoffrey W. Coates (born 1966), American chemist and academic
- George Coates (born 1952), American theater director
- Gloria Coates (1938–2023), American composer
- Gordon Coates (1878–1943), Prime Minister of New Zealand
- Gregory Coates (born 1961), American artist

== J–R ==
- James Coates (parliamentary official) (1815–1854), prominent pioneer settler of Auckland and parliamentary official
- Sir James Coates (banker) (1851–1935), New Zealand banker
- James Henry Coates (1829–1902), American Civil War regimental commander
- Jefferson Coates (1843–1880), American soldier, Medal of Honor recipient
- Jim Coates (1932–2019), Major League Baseball pitcher
- John Coates (businessman) (born 1970), English businessman and vice-chairman of Stoke City F.C.
- John Coates (general) (1932–2018), Lieutenant General Henry John Coates (Australia)
- John Coates (naval architect) (1922–2010), English naval architect
- John Coates (tenor) (1865–1941), English operatic tenor
- John Dowling Coates (born 1949), Australian lawyer, sports administrator and businessman
- John H. Coates (1945–2022), Australian mathematician and Sadleirian Professor of Pure Mathematics at the University of Cambridge
- Joseph R. T. Coates (died s1921), American politician
- Kim Coates (born 1959), Canadian actor
- Laura Coates, American attorney and legal analyst
- Lorene T. Coates (born 1936), member of the North Carolina General Assembly
- Matt Coates (born 1991), Canadian football player
- Melissa Coates (1971–2021), female bodybuilder and professional wrestler
- Natasha Coates (born c. 1995), British disabled gymnast
- Nigel Coates (admiral) (1959–2010), a naval officer in the Royal Australian Navy
- Odia Coates (1942–1991), American musician
- Paul Coates (publisher) (born 1946), American publisher, printer and community activist
- Peter Coates (born 1938), English businessman and chairman of Stoke City F.C.
- Phyllis Coates (1927–2023), American film and television actress known for her role as Superman's Lois Lane
- Ralph Coates (1946–2010), English footballer
- Reginald Coates (1920–2005), British civil engineer
- Richard Coates (born 1949), British professor of linguistics
- Robert Coates (actor) (1772–1848), English eccentric and amateur actor
- Robert M. Coates (1897–1973), American art critic and writer
- Robert Coates (politician) (1928–2016), Canadian politician

== S–Z ==
- Sam Coates, British journalist
- Simon Coates (disambiguation), various people
- Steve Coates (born 1950), professional hockey player and hockey broadcaster
- Sebastián Coates (born 1990), Uruguayan football player.
- Ta-Nehisi Coates (born 1975), American author and journalist
- Udolphus Aylmer Coates (1908–2000), British town planner
- Wayne Coates, former member of the Ohio House of Representatives
- Wells Coates (1895–1958), Canadian architect best known for his work in England
- William Coates, 1st Baronet (1866–1932), Irish stockbroker and politician
- William Coates (longevity claimant) (1911–2004), American who falsely claimed to being the world's oldest person
- W. P. Coates (1883–1963), Irish labour activist and communist

== See also ==
- Coats (surname)
- Coutts (surname)
- Coate (surname)
