= Coteaux =

Coteaux may refer to:

== Places ==
- Les Côteaux, Haiti, a commune in the Côteaux Arrondissement of Haiti
  - Les Côteaux Arrondissement, an arrondissement of the Sud department of Haiti
- Les Coteaux, Quebec, Canada; a municipality in Vaudreuil-Soulanges
- Les Coteaux, Tobago, Trinidad and Tobago; a village in Tobago, Trinidad and Tobago
- Canton of Les Coteaux, Hautes-Pyrénées, France
- Les Coteaux (Mulhouse), a locality in the city of Mulhouse, Alsace, Grand-Est, France

== Other uses ==
- Prix des Coteaux, a thoroughbred race in Chantilly, France
- Radio Coteaux, a community radio station in Saint Blancard, Gers, Gascony, Occitanie, France

== See also ==
- Coteau (disambiguation)
- Cotes (disambiguation)
- Cote (disambiguation)
- Eau (disambiguation)
