= Hundred of Martock =

Historical Hundred of Somerset, England

Martock Hundred
- Status: Hundred
  - HQ: Martock
- Subdivisions
  - Type: Parishes

The Hundred of Martock is one of the 40 historical Hundreds in the ceremonial county of Somerset, England, dating from before the Norman conquest during the Anglo-Saxon era although exact dates are unknown. Each hundred had a 'fyrd', which acted as the local defence force and a court which was responsible for the maintenance of the frankpledge system. They also formed a unit for the collection of taxes. The role of the hundred court was described in the Dooms (laws) of King Edgar. The name of the hundred was normally that of its meeting-place.

The Hundred of Martock consisted of the ancient parish of Martock. The northern boundary was the River Ivel and the southern boundary the Fosse Way. It originated in a Royal Estate which existed before the Norman Conquest.

The ancient Hundred of Martock is formed in the shape of a trapezoidal rectangle, the north side bounded by the River Ivel (Yeo) and the south side bounded by the Fosse Way (A303). National Grid References at the four ‘corners’ are: NW ST 4450.2525 Wet Moor, NW ST 4890.2355 Kingsmoor Drove, SW ST 4500.1670 Petherton Bridge and SE ST 4961.2045 Tailes Farm.

The hundred originated as a pre Norman Conquest royal estate. In 1225 it included Ash, Bower Hinton, Coat, and Stapleton. Hurst and Long Load are included in a document of 1243, and Milton in 1284–6. By 1327 Newton (grouped with Hurst) and Westcombland (in Buckland St Mary) are included. By 1841 Bower Hinton and Hurst were joined Newton was not included in the hundred.

The importance of the hundred courts declined from the seventeenth century. By the 19th century several different single-purpose subdivisions of counties, such as poor law unions, sanitary districts, and highway districts sprang up, filling the administrative role previously played by parishes and hundreds. Although the Hundreds have never been formally abolished, their functions ended with the establishment of county courts in 1867 and the introduction of districts by the Local Government Act 1894.
