= Coats =

Coats may refer to:

== People ==
- Coats (surname)

== Places ==
- Coats, Kansas, US
- Coats, North Carolina, US
- Coats Island, Nunavut, Canada
- Coats Land, region of Antarctica

== Other uses ==
- Coat (clothing), an outer garment
- Coats' disease, a human eye disorder
- Coats Mission, British military mission 1941–42
- Coats Group, a multinational sewing and needlecraft supplies manufacturer
- Coats Steam Car, American automobile manufactured 1922–23
- Stewart-Coats, American automobile manufactured only in 1922
- Cadet Organizations Administration and Training Service, a sub-component of the Canadian Forces Reserves

== See also ==
- Coat (disambiguation)
- Coates (disambiguation)
- Cotes (disambiguation)
