= Cote =

Cote, Côte or COTE may refer to:

== Architecture ==
- Dovecote, a building for pigeons or doves.

== People ==
- Cote (surname)
- Cote (footballer) (born 1989), born "José Ángel Valdés Díaz", Spanish footballer
- Cote de Pablo, television actress
- Cote First Nation

== Religion ==
- Church of the East, Non-Ephesian branch of Christianity

== Businesses ==
- Cote (restaurant), Korean steakhouse in Las Vegas, New York City, and Miami
- Côte, British restaurant chain

== Geographic names ==
- Rural Municipality of Cote No. 271, Saskatchewan, Canada
- Cote, Oxfordshire, England
- Cote, Somerset, England, part of the parish of East Huntspill
- Cote, West Sussex, England, part of the Borough of Worthing
- Cote Blanche, a place in St. Mary parish, Louisiana
- Côtes-d'Armor, French department
- Côte d'Azur, part of the French Mediterranean coastline
- Côte-des-Neiges, a neighbourhood of Montreal, Quebec, Canada
- Côte d'Ivoire, a country in West Africa
- Côte-d'Or, French department
- Côte Saint-Luc, Canadian municipality in Quebec
- Côte Vermeille, part of the French Mediterranean coastline, near the border with Spain
- Grande Côte, a stretch of coastline in Senegal
- Lake Cote, largest natural lake in Costa Rica
- Petite Côte, a stretch of coastline in Senegal
- Plaza Côte-des-Neiges, a mall in Montreal, Quebec, Canada

== Charitable organisation ==
- Children On The Edge, a charity that helps marginalized and vulnerable children

== Arts, entertainment, and media ==
- Classroom of the Elite, a light novel series written by Shōgo Kinugasa
- Choir of the Earth, a virtual choir
- The Cote Photo, a 2026 American documentary film

== See also ==
- Côté
- Coate (disambiguation)
- Coefficients of Thermal Expansion (COTE) for various materials
- Cotes (disambiguation)
