= Coteau =

Coteau, Coteaus, may refer to:

== Places ==
- Rural Municipality of Coteau No. 255, Saskatchewan, Canada
  - Coteau Beach, Saskatchewan, Canada; a village and beach in the Rural Municipality of Coteau No. 255.
- Couteau Creek, a tributary of the South Saskatchewan River in Saskatchewan, Canada, containing the Coteau Creek Hydroelectric Station
- Coteau Road, New Brunswick, Canada
- Les Coteaux, Quebec, Canada; a municipality in Vaudreuil-Soulanges
  - Coteau-Landing, Quebec, Canada; a former town subsequently merged into Les Coteaux
  - Coteau-Station, Quebec, Canada; a former town subsequently merged into Les Coteaux
- Le Coteau, a commune in the Loire department in central France
- Canton of Le Coteau, a canton containing the commune, in Loire, France

=== Facilities and structures ===
- Coteau station, Les Coteaux, Quebec, Canada; a rail station
- Les Coteaux, Mulhouse, Alsace, France; a public housing estate
- Coteau Creek Hydroelectric Station, Saskatchewan, Canada

== People ==
- Michael Coteau (born 1972), Canadian politician
- David DeCoteau (born 1962), American-Canadian filmmaker
- Clifton De Coteau (died 2021), Trinidad politician

== Other uses ==
- Coteau Books, a small, non-profit literary press

== See also ==
- Cote (disambiguation)
- Coteau-du-Lac canal, Quebec
- Coteaux (disambiguation)
- Couteau (disambiguation)
- Eau (disambiguation)
- Grand Coteau (disambiguation)
