= George Coats =

George Coats or Coates may refer to:

- George Coates (born 1952), American theater director
- George Coates (cricketer) (1817–1885), English cricketer
- George Coates (footballer) (1923–2014), Australian rules footballer
- George Coats, 1st Baron Glentanar (1849–1918), Scottish cotton manufacturer
- George Coats of Coats' disease

== See also ==
- Coats (surname)
- Coates (surname)
