= Coate (surname) =

Coate is a surname of multiple purposed origins, most of which from Old and Middle English. It may have begun as a way to refer to someone who dwelled in a small cottage, potentially coming from the surname Cot. It is also said to have emerged as a locational surname for people from various locations in Britain that have names derived from the word cottage, such as Coat, Somerset, Coate, Wiltshire, and Cote, Oxfordshire. These instances could be closely connected to the surname Coates, as the two surnames would morph into each other due to pluralization and singularization. In addition to words for cottages, Coate may derive from Old English terms for animal pens, potentially denoting a connection or proximity to an enclosure for livestock. It is theorized that the name owes some of its prevalence to association with the garment coat.

The surname can also occur as the result of the Americanization of similar sounding German surnames, such as Koth.

Nationally, the United States has the most recorded instances of people with the surname Coate, and Australia has the highest proportion of its population that bears the surname.

Notable people with the surname include:

- Edward Coate (1908–1995), Australian military aviator
- Jennifer Coate (born 1953), Australian jurist
- John Coate (born 1951), American media executive
- Mary Coate (1886–1972), English historian
- Randoll Coate (1909–2005), British diplomat and maze designer
- Roger A. Coate, American political scientist
- Roland Coate (1890–1958), American architect
- Stephen Coate, British-American economist
- Winifred Coate (1893–1977), British missionary

== See also ==
- Coates (surname)
- Cote (surname)
