= William Coates =

William Coates may refer to:

- Sir William Coates, 1st Baronet (1866–1932), Irish stockbroker, Lord Mayor of Belfast, 1920–1923, 1929–1931
- William Coates (businessman) (1882–1963), British civil servant and businessman
- William Coates (longevity claimant) (1911–2004), American alleged centenarian
- W. P. Coates (William Peyton Coates, 1883–1963), Irish labour activist and communist
- William Coates (technician) (1919–1993), science communicator, lecturer and technician
- Paul Coates (publisher) (William Paul Coates, born 1946), African-American publisher and father of Ta-Nehisi Coates

== See also ==
- Coates (disambiguation)
