= David Coates =

David Coates may refer to:

- David Coates (footballer) (born 1935), English footballer
- David C. Coates (1868–1933), Lieutenant Governor of Colorado
- Sir David Charlton Frederick Coates, 3rd Baronet (born 1948), of the Coates baronets
- David Coates (diplomat) (born 1947), British diplomat and scholar
- David Coates (political economist) (1946–2018), British academic

== See also ==
- Coates (disambiguation)
