= Côté =

Côté, Coté, or Cote is a surname. Notable people with the surname include:

- Alain Côté (ice hockey b. 1957), (born 1957) Canadian ice hockey player
- Alain Côté (ice hockey b. 1967), (born 1967) Canadian ice hockey player
- Alcide Côté (1903–1955), Canadian politician and Postmaster General
- Bob Cote, American politician
- Brandin Cote, Canadian NHL player
- David Cote (disambiguation), several people
- Denise Cote, a U.S. federal judge
- Dimitri Nana-Côté, Canadian drag queen
- Ernest Côté (1913–2015), Canadian soldier, diplomat and civil servant.
- David Côté (politician) (1915–1969), Canadian politician
- Gérard Côté (1913–1993), Canadian marathon runner
- Gisèle Côté-Harper (born 1942), Canadian lawyer and professor
- Guy Côté (born 1965), Canadian politician
- Héliodore Côté (1934–2022), Canadian politician
- Héloïse Côté (born 1979), Canadian writer
- Isabelle M. Côté, Canadian ecologist
- Jacques Côté (born 1944), Canadian politician
- Jean Côté (1867–1924), Canadian politician
- Jean-Philippe Côté (born 1982), Canadian ice hockey player
- Jean-Pierre Côté (1926–2002) Canadian politician and Landscape painter
- Marc Aurèle de Foy Suzor-Coté (1869–1937), Canadian painter and sculptor
- Michael Richard Cote, Roman Catholic bishop in USA
- Michel Côté (born 1942), Canadian politician and member of the House of Commons
- Michel Côté (MNA) (1937–2023), Quebec politician and Member of the National Assembly
- Michel Côté (actor) (1950–2023), Canadian actor
- Patrick Côté (fighter) (born 1980), Canadian mixed martial arts fighter
- Patrick Côté (ice hockey) (born 1975), Canadian ice hockey player
- Paul Côté (1944–2013), Canadian sailor
- Pierre F. Côté (1927–2013), Canadian civil servant and lawyer
- Ray Cote, Canadian NHL player
- Ries Coté (1946–2024), Dutch footballer
- Riley Cote, Canadian NHL player
- Rita Coté (1921–2014), birth name of Betty Cody, Canadian singer
- Roger Côté (1939–2020), Canadian ice hockey player
- Suzanne Côté (born 1958), Canadian Supreme Court justice
- Sylvain Côté, Canadian NHL player
