= Mary Hood (businesswoman) =

- Born: c. 1822
- Died: 4 November 1902
- Occupation: Businesswoman
- Known for: Groceries, haberdashery and fancy goods trade in New Zealand

Mary Hood (c.1822–4 November 1902) was a New Zealand businesswoman within groceries, haberdashery and fancy goods.

== Biography ==
She was born in Martock, Somerset, England on c.1822. She took over the family business as a widow in 1866, after having assisted her husband for twenty years.
