= Treasurer's House =

Treasurer's House may refer to:

- Treasurer's House, Martock, in Somerset, England
- Treasurer's House, York, in North Yorkshire, England
