= Cotes =

Cotes may refer to:

== Placename ==
- Cotes, Cumbria, a village in England
- Cotes, Leicestershire, a village in England
- Cotes, Staffordshire, a village in England; see List of United Kingdom locations: Cos-Cou
- Cotes, Valencia, a municipality in Spain

== Other ==
- Cotes (surname), list of people with the surname
- Cotes (beetle), a beetle genus in the sub family Lemodinae
- Control of International Trade in Endangered Species (COTES), a British organisation
- Newton–Cotes formulas, in mathematics

== See also ==
- Coates (disambiguation)
- Coats (disambiguation)
- Côtes-d'Armor
- Cote (disambiguation)
