= Cotte =

Medieval garment

The cotte (or cote) was a medieval outer garment, a long sleeved shift, or tunic, usually girded, and worn by men and women. In medieval texts, it was used to translate tunica or chiton. Synonyms included tunic or gown. It was worn over a shirt (chemise), and a sleeveless surcote could be worn over it. By the sixteenth century, it had become a woman's undergarment. By the seventeenth century, it split into an upper 'corps' and a lower 'cotte', or skirt, amongst the poorer classes.

In modern French, it survives in the expression cotte de mailles ("chainmail"). The Old French cote also gave rise to the word cotillon ("cotillion", a dance). Petticoat is another indirect descendant of cote.

== See also ==
- Coat (disambiguation)
- Surplice (cotta), a liturgical vestment
- The cotta in Italian 15th-century fashion
