= Robert Coats =

Robert Coats may refer to:

- Robert R. Coats (1910–1995), American geologist
- Robert H. Coats (1874–1960), Canada's first Dominion Statistician
