= John Cotes =

John Cotes may refer to:

- John Cotes (1682–1756), MP for Lichfield
- John Cotes (died 1821), British MP
- John Cotes (died 1874), his son, also an MP

== See also ==
- John Coates (disambiguation)
