= Couteau =

Couteau may refer to:

- Knife in French
- 4909 Couteau, the asteroid Couteau, 4909th asteroid registered
- Robert Couteau (born 1956), U.S. astrologer
- Rural Municipality of Coteau No. 255, Saskatchewan, Canada

== See also ==
- Coteau (disambiguation)
