= Cotes (surname) =

Cotes is a surname of English origin. Notable people with the surname are as follows:

- Ambrosio Cotes (c.1550–1603), Spanish composer
- Charles Cecil Cotes (1846–1898), British landowner and politician
- Everard Charles Cotes (1862–1944), British entomologist
- Francis Cotes (1726–1770), British painter
- George Cotes (death of birth unknown–1556), British Catholic bishop
- John Cotes, multiple people
- Leonard Cotes (fl. 1669-1701[1]), British painter
- Merton Russell-Cotes (1835–1921), Mayor of Bournemouth, England
- Roger Cotes (1682–1716), British mathematician, colleague of Isaac Newton
- Samuel Cotes (1734–1818), British painter
- Thomas Cotes (death of birth unknown–1641), British printer
