= Stewart-Coats =

Defunct American motor vehicle manufacturer

The Stewart Motor Car Company was formed in March 1920 in Bowling Green, Ohio and announced plans to build several types of cars. Only one gasoline touring car prototype was built. In 1922 an agreement was made to build the Coats Steam Car, with its operations located in Columbus moving to Bowling Green. The Stewart people called it the Stewart-Coats but only a pilot model was completed.
