= Coat (disambiguation) =

A coat is an outer garment worn on the upper body for warmth or fashion.

Coat may also refer to:

- Coat, a layer of a certain substance, usually paint
- Animal coat, the natural fur coat of an animal
  - Dog coat, the natural hair coat of a dog
- Coat of arms, a heraldic design used to identify a nation, city, family, or individual
- Lounge coat, another term for the lounge jacket as part of a lounge suit
- Rug (animal covering), also known as an animal coat, an article of clothing for animals
- Cindy Coat, French female canoeist
- Coat Corporation

== See also ==
- Coate (disambiguation)
- Coats (disambiguation)
- Cote (disambiguation)
