= Church of All Saints, Martock =

Church in Somerset, England

Church of All Saints
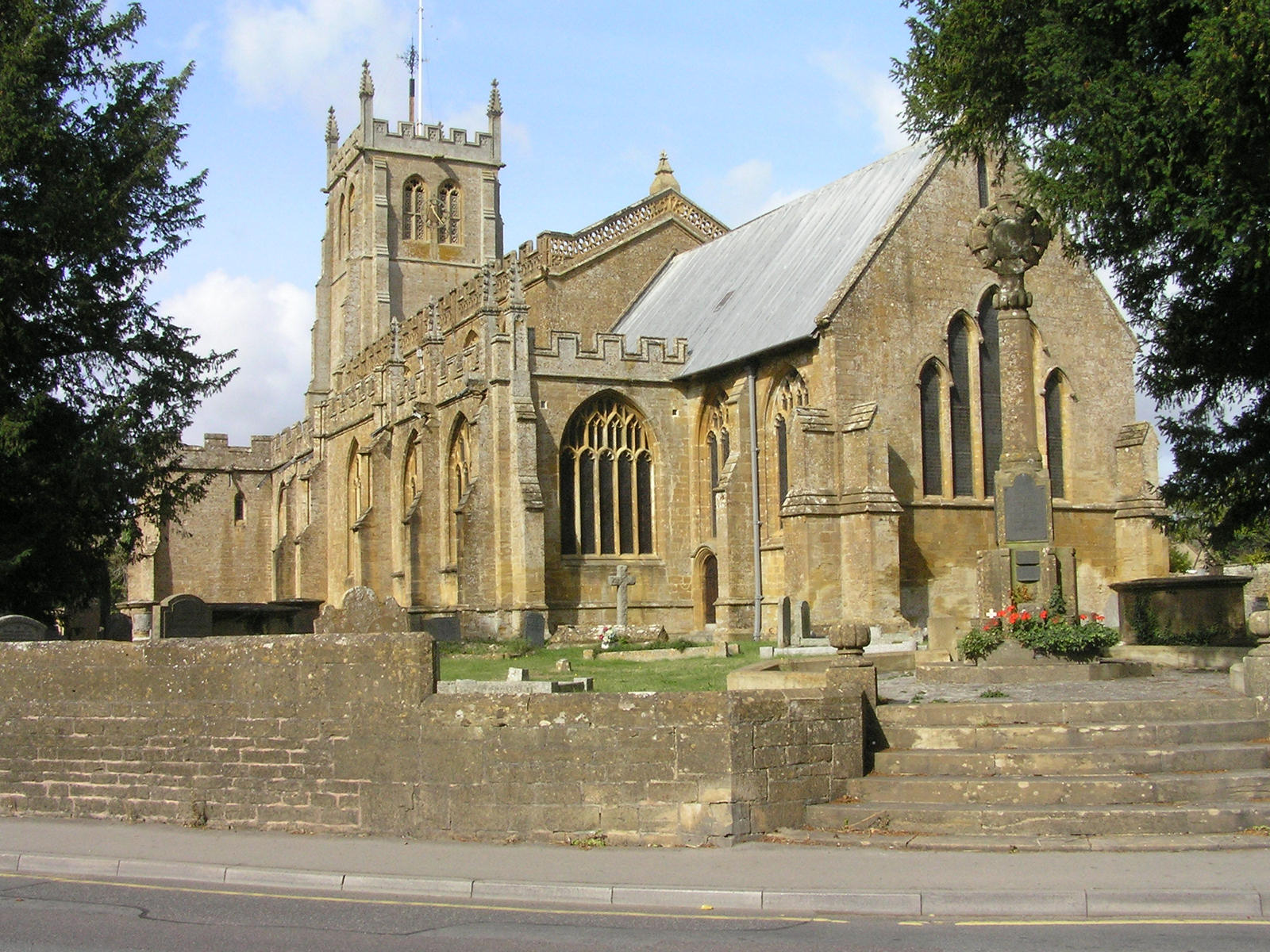

- Location within Somerset
- 50°58′10″N 2°46′08″W
- Location: Martock, Somerset, England

History
- Built: 13th century

Listed Building – Grade I
- Official name: Church of All Saints
- Designated: 28 April 1987
- Reference no.: 1065888

The Church of All Saints in Martock, Somerset, England dates from the 13th century and has been designated as a Grade I listed building.

The church was acquired by the Treasurer of Wells Cathedral in 1227 and he became the rector and patron of the church. He lived in the Treasurer's House.

The tower dates from around 1505, in four stages, with offset corner buttresses to the full height of the tower, to replace the previous one over the central crossing. At the same time the rest of the church was also restored and expanded. This expansion was paid for by Lady Margaret Beaufort.

In July 1645 the church was used as a billet and damaged by the troops of Oliver Cromwell after a battle at Bridgwater, this included the removal of the statues of saints from niches in the clerestory.

The church was restored by Benjamin Ferrey, who was architect to the Diocese of Bath and Wells from 1841 until his death, and also in 1883–84 by Ewan Christian when a new pulpit was installed. The interior includes a stucco plaster altar and an organ which was previously in Wells Cathedral.

In 1919 the Lady Chapel was restored and furnished, and a screen added across the aisle arch. In 1921 the Jacobean altar table, which had long been used as a vestry table, was repaired and replaced as the High Altar. In 1923 the leads of the tower and aisles were renewed and repaired.

== See also ==
- List of Grade I listed buildings in South Somerset
- List of towers in Somerset
- List of ecclesiastical parishes in the Diocese of Bath and Wells
