= Coats (surname) =

Coats is a surname of English origin.

== People surnamed Coats ==
- A.W. (Bob) Coats (1924–2007), English economist, historian of economic thought
- Alfred M. Coats (1869–1942), Scottish-American business, general manager of the J. & P. Coats plant in Pawtucket, R.I.
- Amelia R. Coats, American printmaker
- Brittany Coats, American biomechanical engineer
- Buck Coats (born 1982), American professional baseball player
- Dan Coats (born 1943), American diplomat and politician; served as the Director of National Intelligence
- Herbert P. Coats (1872–1932), New York state senator and Puerto Rico attorney general
- James Coats (1894–1966), British skeleton racer
- John Coats (1906–1979), Scottish theosophist; bishop of the Liberal Catholic Church
- Michael Coats (born 1946), American NASA astronaut
- Michael Coats Jr. (born 2001), American football player
- Sir Peter Coats (1808–1890), founder of J & P Coats in Paisley
- Robert H. Coats (1874–1960), Canadian statistician
- Robert R. Coats (1910–1995), Canadian-American geologist
- Stuart Coats (1868–1959), British politician; MP for Wimbledon and East Surrey
- Thomas Coats (1809–1893), made Paisley, Scotland, the world center for thread making.

== See also ==
- Coats baronets, in the Baronetage of the United Kingdom
- Glen-Coats baronets, in the Baronetage of the United Kingdom
- Coates (surname)
- Cotes (disambiguation)
