= Coat, Somerset =

Coordinates: 50.980278°N 2.780278°W

Coat
- Location within Somerset
- OS grid reference: ST457204
- Civil parish: Martock
- Ceremonial county: Somerset
- Region: South West
- Country: England
- Sovereign state: United Kingdom
- Police: Avon and Somerset
- Fire: Devon and Somerset
- Ambulance: South Western

Coat is a hamlet in the parish of Martock, Somerset, England. It is a primarily agricultural settlement, its closest neighboring settlements being the village of Martock and the hamlet of Stapleton. Its main roads are Coat Road, Highway Road, and Cripple Street.

== History ==
The first recorded mention of Coat is from the year 1225, in which it is spelled as Coate. Formerly a tything of the parish of Martock, Coat used to comprise a larger area than the modern settlement, including land that has been absorbed by the neighboring village of Martock. The tything contained a communal pasture referred to as Coat Hay and a communal meadow recorded as Coat Mead, with the grazing land being shared with neighboring settlements.

Coat is home to eleven grade II listed buildings in the National Heritage List for England, with some prominent instances including the Coat Farmhouse, Little Manor, Coat House, Greystones Farmhouse, and The Old Coat Inn. Coat is also home to a conservation area, established in 1981.

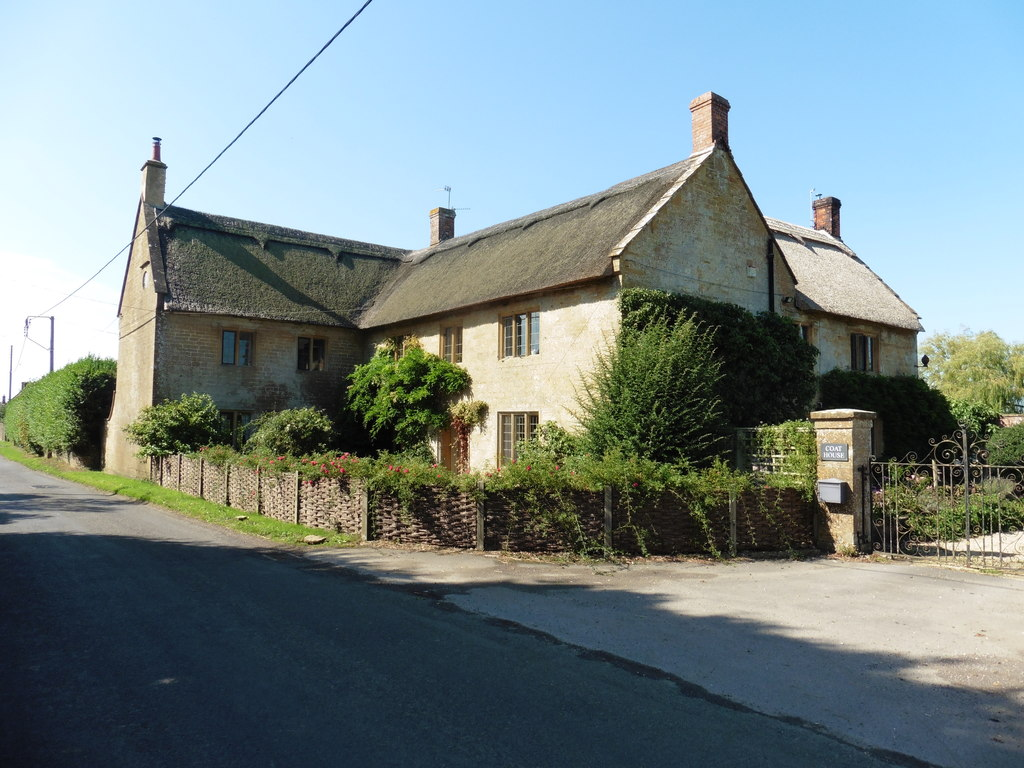
Coat House

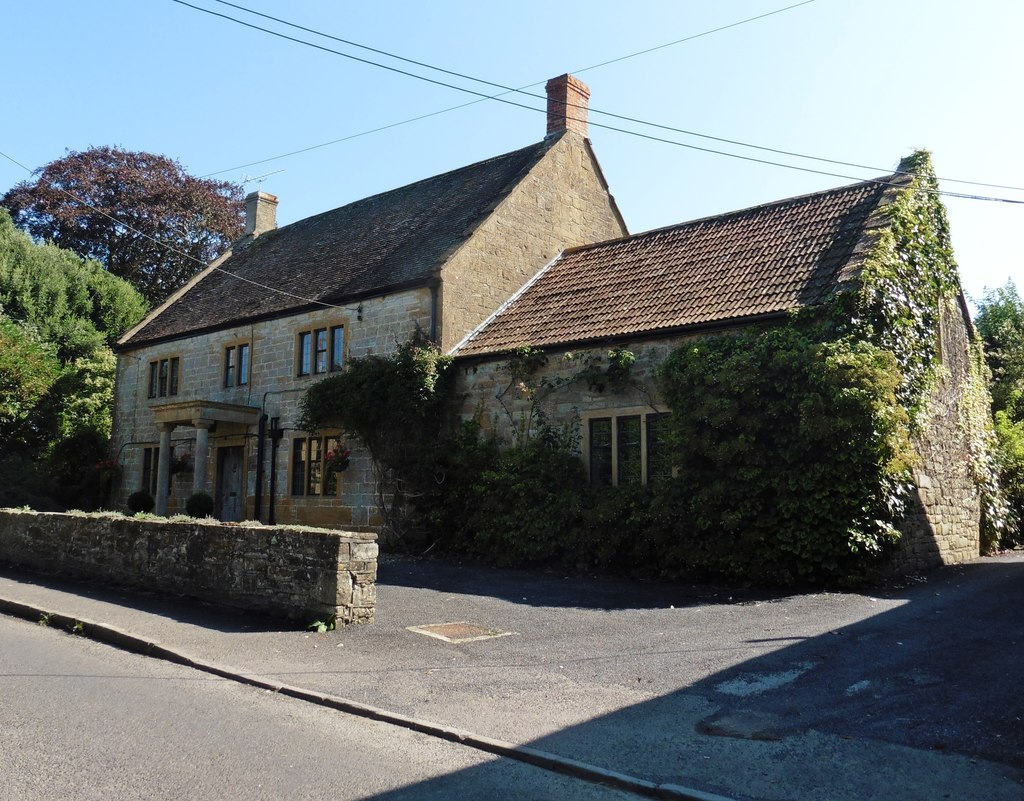
The Old Coat Inn

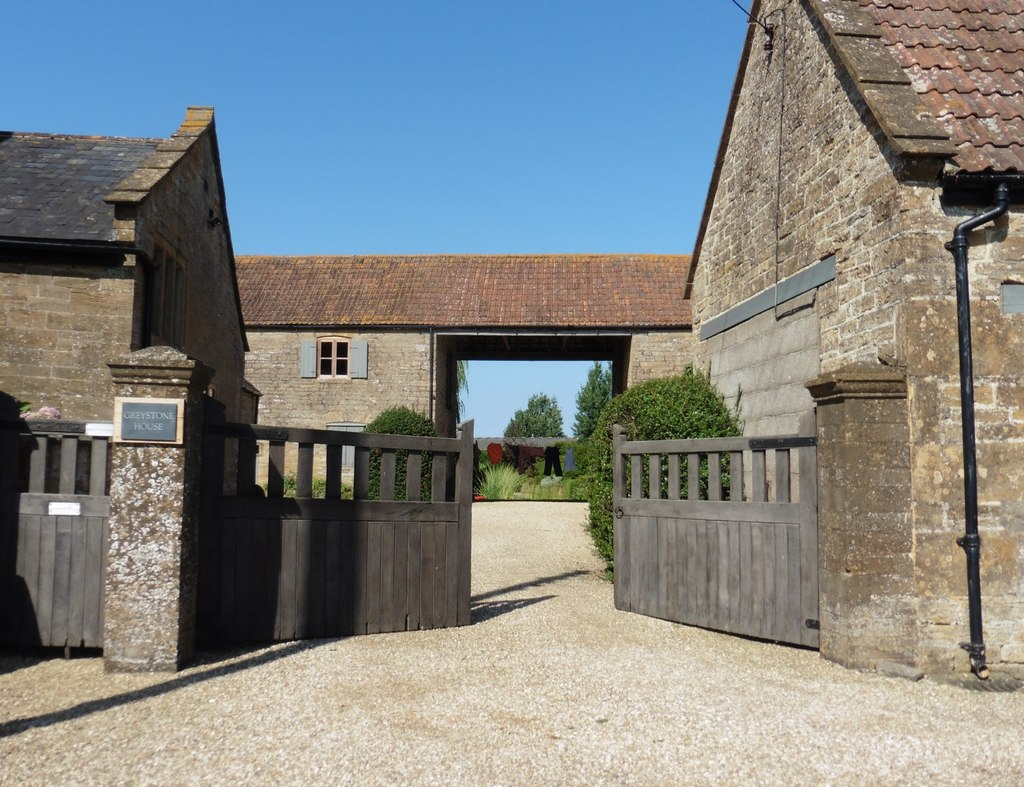
Greystone House Gateway

== See also ==
- Coat (disambiguation)
- Cote, Oxfordshire
- Cote, West Sussex
