= Ash, South Somerset =

Village in Somerset, England

Coordinates: 50.9831°N 2.7506°W

Ash
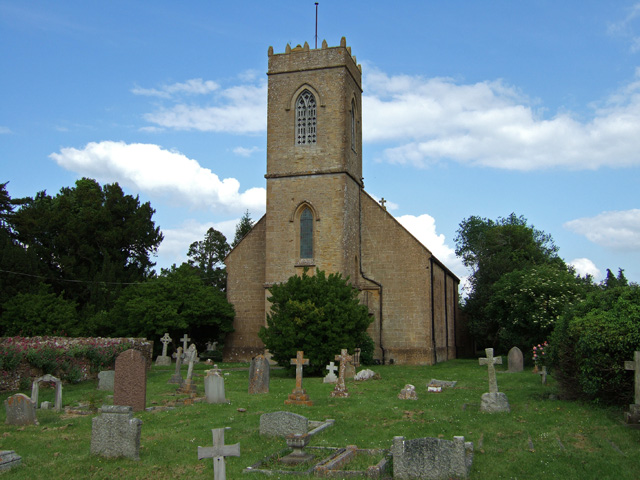
- Holy Trinity Church, Ash

- Location within Somerset
- Population: 626 (2011)
- OS grid reference: ST474206
- Unitary authority: Somerset Council
- Ceremonial county: Somerset
- Region: South West
- Country: England
- Sovereign state: United Kingdom
- Post town: MARTOCK
- Postcode district: TA12
- Dialling code: 01935
- Police: Avon and Somerset
- Fire: Devon and Somerset
- Ambulance: South Western
- UK Parliament: Glastonbury and Somerton

Ash is a village and parish in Somerset, England, situated 1 mile (1.6 km) from Martock and 6 miles (9.7 km) north-west of Yeovil. The parish has a population of 626. The parish includes the hamlets of Milton and Witcombe.

== History ==
The name Ash, from the Old English aesc means "place with/near ash tree(s)." It was first mentioned in 1086 as 'Aisse', it next appears, in 1225 as 'Esse' . Probably derived from Old English 'aesc' the ash tree. Hence, (place at) the ash tree/s.

Milton was first mentioned in 1284-6 as 'Milton Fauconberg' or 'Falcenbridge'. There appear to be two possible derivations: The gentle enclosure from Old English 'milde' and 'tun' (cf Upper and Lower Milton, near Wells) or the middle enclosure from the Old English 'middel' and 'tun' Since Milton lies between the tithings of Long Load and Witcombe.

Witcombe means the white valley from the Old English 'hwit' and 'cumb'. It occurs as 'Whythicumbe' in 1243, in which case cf Withycombe (near Carhampton), the willow valley from the Old English 'wippe' and 'cumb'. It may also be 'wide valley' from Old English.

The medieval settlement seems to have included two separate hamlets on the two adjacent parallel lanes. These were the centres of the two medieval manors: Ash Boulogne to the west, and Pykesash to the east. Both nuclei are characterised by an irregular group of working farms.

The parish was created in 1895 from the north eastern quarter of Martock.

== Governance ==
The parish council has responsibility for local issues, including setting an annual precept (local rate) to cover the council's operating costs and producing annual accounts for public scrutiny. The parish council evaluates local planning applications and works with the local police, district council officers, and neighbourhood watch groups on matters of crime, security, and traffic. The parish council's role also includes initiating projects for the maintenance and repair of parish facilities, as well as consulting with the district council on the maintenance, repair, and improvement of highways, drainage, footpaths, public transport, and street cleaning. Conservation matters (including trees and listed buildings) and environmental issues are also the responsibility of the council.

For local government purposes, since 1 April 2023, the village comes under the unitary authority of Somerset Council. Prior to this, it was part of the non-metropolitan district of South Somerset, which was formed on 1 April 1974 under the Local Government Act 1972, having previously been part of Yeovil Rural District.

It is also part of the Glastonbury and Somerton county constituency represented in the House of Commons of the Parliament of the United Kingdom. It elects one Member of Parliament (MP) by the first past the post system of election, and was part of the South West England constituency of the European Parliament prior to Britain leaving the European Union in January 2020, which elected seven MEPs using the d'Hondt method of party-list proportional representation.
