= Christ Church, Long Load =

Church in Somerset, England

Christ Church
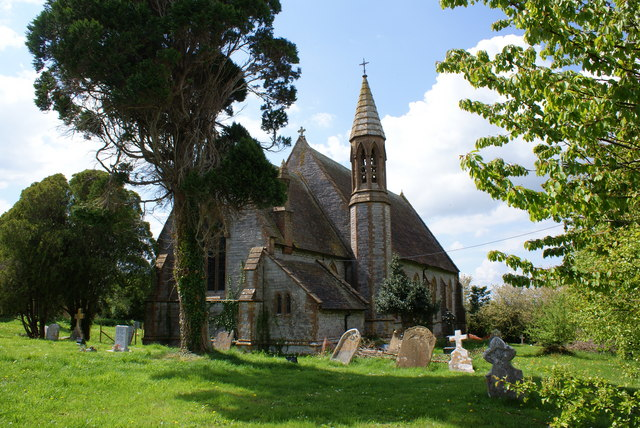

Religion
- Affiliation: Church of England
- Ecclesiastical or organizational status: Redundant
- Year consecrated: 1856

Location
- Location: Long Load, Somerset, England
- Interactive map of Christ Church
- Coordinates: 51.0054°N 2.7639°W

Architecture
- Architect: Charles Edmund Giles
- Type: Church
- Style: Early English style

Christ Church is a former Church of England church in Long Load, Somerset, England. Designed by Charles Edmund Giles, it was built in 1854–1856 on the site of an earlier chapel and closed in 2011. The former church is now a private residence and a Grade II listed building.

== History ==
A small chapel serving Long Load is known to have existed as early as 1418. By 1791, the building had become "ruinous" and was demolished and replaced in 1796 with a new building smaller than its predecessor. By the middle of the 19th-century, the 1796 chapel had also fallen into a dilapidated state. A scheme was devised, and an appeal was launched to raise £2,500 for the construction of a new church, a schoolroom and a parsonage. By April 1855, approximately £1,700 had been raised. The schoolroom was erected at a cost of £350 and was granted a license to be used as a place of worship until the new church was completed. The plans for the new church were drawn up by C. E. Giles of Taunton, with accommodation for 279 persons.

Construction commenced in 1854 and the church was consecrated by the Bishop of Bath and Wells, the Right Rev. Robert Eden, on 11 September 1856. The consecration was originally set for 4 September, but had to be postponed when the Bishop's wife fell ill. The estimated cost of the church was £1,300. Long Load was made its own ecclesiastical parish in 1867.

Christ Church closed as a place of worship in 2011. It was subsequently sold and planning permission was granted in 2014 to convert the building into a three-bedroom residence. Long Load and Long Sutton formed a new parish in 2017.

== Architecture ==
Christ Church is built of Blue Lias stone with dressings in Hamstone. The Blue Lias was gifted by the Earl of Burlington and supplied from his quarries at Long Sutton. The church was made up of a five-bay nave, two-bay chancel, south porch, north-east vestry and spirelet with bell. A Jacobean pulpit was retained from the older chapel.
