= Market House, Martock =

Municipal building in Martock, Somerset, England

The Market House
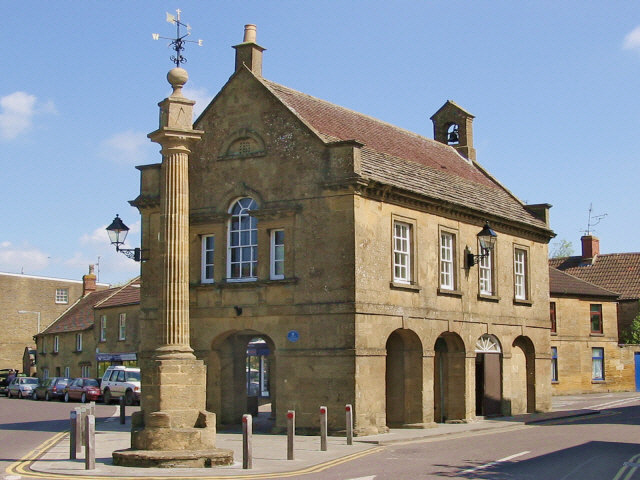
- The Market House

- Shown in Somerset
- 50.9706°N 2.7664°W
- Location: Church Street, Martock

History
- Built: 1785

Site notes
- Architectural style: Neoclassical style

Listed Building – Grade II
- Official name: The Market House
- Designated: 19 April 1961
- Reference no.: 1225758

The Market House, also known as Martock Town Hall, is a municipal building in Church Street in Martock, Somerset, England. The building, which is the meeting place of Martock Parish Council, is a Grade II listed building.

== History ==
A Tuscan order column, with a ball finial and a wrought iron weather vane, which had been modelled on a monument commemorating the Emperor Trajan at Wilton House, was installed in the market place in 1741. However, until the mid-18th century, the only protection from the weather that market traders in the town enjoyed was an ancient oak tree. In around 1753, the vestry started discussions about erecting a dedicated market house, although it was not until the Slade family acquired the local manor in 1759, that plans progressed: the then lord of the manor, George Slade, commissioned the building in the early 1780s. The market hall was designed in the neoclassical style, built in ashlar hamstone and was completed in around 1785.

The design involved a symmetrical main frontage facing south down Church Street; the ground floor was arcaded, so that butchers' markets could be held, with an assembly room on the first floor. There was a round headed opening with voussoirs and keystones on the ground floor, a Venetian window supported by brackets on the first floor and a semi-circular vent in the gable above. The side elevations extended back four bays with sash windows on the first floor while the north elevation, which was also fenestrated by a sash window on the first floor, was surmounted by a turret containing a small bell.

The manorial estate, including the market house, was purchased by Robert Goodden of Compton House in the early 19th century. The ground floor was used to accommodate the local fire cart from around that time and was then used to accommodate the local horse-drawn fire engine from the mid-19th century. Following implementation of the Local Government Act 1894, which established parish councils, the assembly room became the meeting place of the local parish council.

A plaque commemorating the exploits of the early aviator, Douglas Graham Gilmour, who had flown in a Bristol Biplane from Larkhill in Wiltshire to Hinton St George in Somerset in April 1911, was transferred from his hangar at Bower Hinton farm to the market house in June 1941. The building remained in the ownership of the Goodden family until it was acquired by the parish council in 1954. The building was restored in the early 1960s, at which time the rear two bays were infilled for use as public toilets. A grant of £190,000 was obtained from the Heritage Lottery Fund to restore the building and establish a community office on the ground floor in 2008. Following completion of the works, the parish council re-occupied the assembly room on the first floor.
