= David Cote =

David Cote or Côté may refer to:

- David M. Cote, chairman and CEO of Honeywell International
- David Cote (writer), theater editor and critic for Time Out New York, essayist, and blogger
- David Cote (politician), American politician
- David Côté (politician), Canadian politician
- David Côté (Canadian football), Canadian football player
