= Coulags =

Coordinates: 57.44949°N 5.39913°W

Coulags: Scottish Gaelic: Na Cùileagan
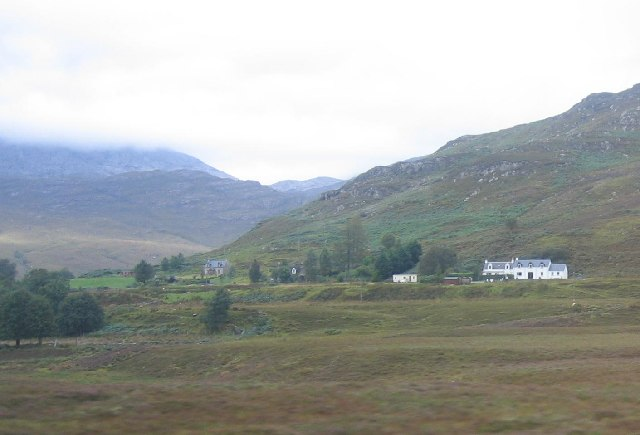
- View towards Coulags, Glen Carron

- Location within the Ross and Cromarty area
- OS grid reference: NG961450
- Council area: Highland
- Country: Scotland
- Sovereign state: United Kingdom
- Postcode district: IV54 8
- Police: Scotland
- Fire: Scottish
- Ambulance: Scottish

Coulags (Scottish Gaelic: Na Cùileagan) is a small hamlet in Glen Carron in Strathcarron, west Ross-shire, Scottish Highlands and is in the Scottish council area of Highland.
