= Fred Coates =

English footballer

Personal information
- Full name: Frederick Coates
- Date of birth: 16 November 1879
- Place of birth: Sheffield, England
- Date of death: 1956 (aged 76–77)
- Position: Wing half

Senior career*
Years	Team	Apps	(Gls)
1900–1901	Hyde		
1901–1904	Glossop	64	(3)
Total		64	(3)
- * Club domestic league appearances and goals

Frederick Coates (16 November 1879 – 1956) was an English footballer who played in the Football League for Glossop.
