= Treasurer's House, Martock =

Grade I listed building in Somerset, UK

Treasurer's House
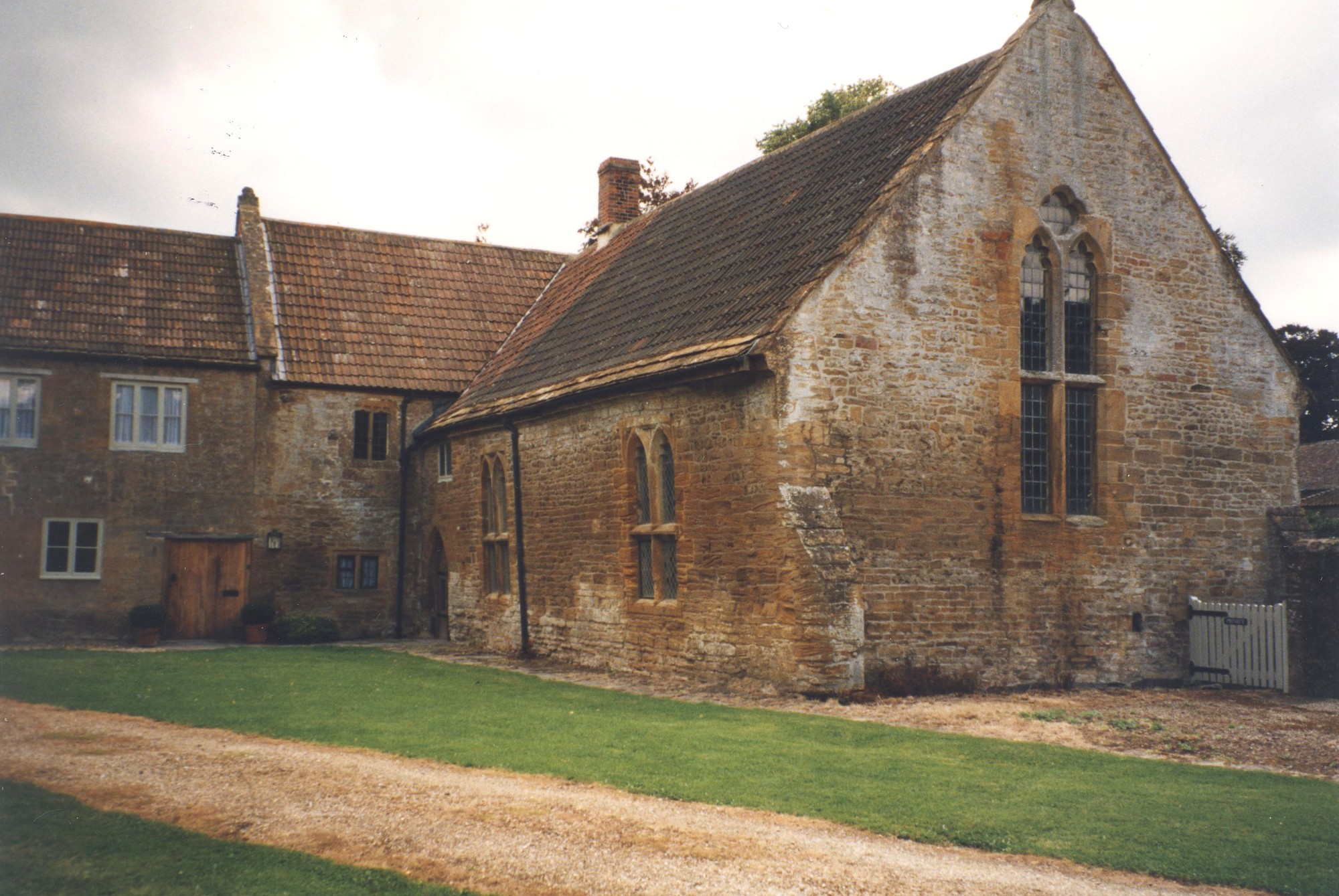
- The great hall and parlour wing.

- Location within Somerset

General information
- Location: Martock, England
- Coordinates: 50.9695°N 2.7726°W
- Completed: 13th century

The Treasurer's House is a National Trust-owned property in Martock, in the English county of Somerset. It has been designated as a Grade I listed building. Apart from the Bishop's Palace, Wells it is the oldest house in the county.

The original 13th-century buildings have been added to several times, including a 15th-century great hall which has an arch-braced-collar truss roof. Several of the rooms have wall paintings which have been uncovered and restored since the National Trust were given the building in 1970. The house belonged to the Bishop of Bath and Wells and at one time was used to store the Great Seal of the Realm when John Langton was the chancellor of England.

== History ==
The Treasurer's House is a medieval priest's house built from Hamstone during the 13th century. The solar block, which was built around 1250 survives as the oldest part of the building, making it the second oldest inhabited house in Somerset. It is mentioned as the parsonage attached to the village Church of All Saints. In 1227 it was acquired by Hugh of Wells the treasurer of Wells Cathedral who became the rector and patron of the church. The great hall was added in 1293. In 1297 John Langton, who was a chancellor of England and Bishop of Chichester, received the Great Seal of the Realm which was stored at the "court at Martock". The kitchen was added in the 15th century.

The Bishop of Bath owned the building, which was known as Martock Priory, until 1849 when it was transferred to the Ecclesiastical Commissioners. It was then privately owned and a small wing added. In 1943 it was bought by Harold St George Gray, the librarian-curator of the Museum for the Somerset Archaeological and Natural History Society to preserve it. His wife bequeathed it to the National Trust in 1970.

In 1987 it was designated as a Grade I listed building.

== Architecture ==
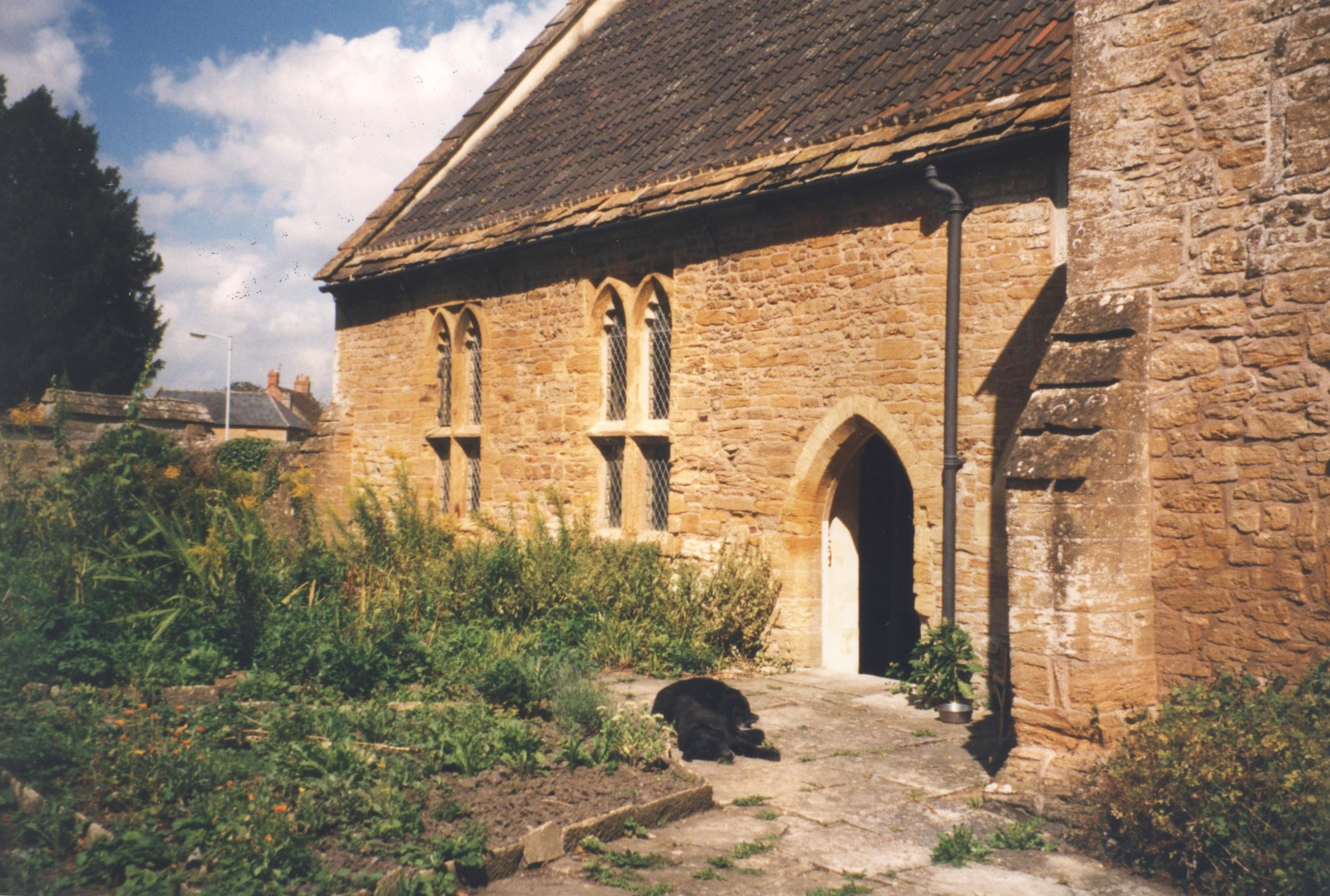
The house and garden

The building has undergone various extensions and alterations since it was built. The building has a T-shaped plan, with the west projecting wing being a hall added in the late 13th century. The great hall has a 15th-century four-bay open arch-braced collar-truss timber roof. The roof was covered with slate from local quarries until it was thatched in the mid 19th century. The current clay tiles were used in the early 20th century.

The kitchen block was added in the late 15th century or early 16th century and has no direct connection with the rest of the house. The Solar Block is the oldest part of the building dating from around 1250. It has a plate tracery window with a Trefoil cusping surrounded by wall paintings. The solar separated from the hall by a screens passage.

The walls of one of the private chambers on the upper floor were covered with 16th century limewash which was removed in 1995, to expose a 13th-century wall painting with a depiction of Jesus on the cross and two other figures. The crucifixion scene with rosettes and vine leaf decoration was uncovered in the 1990s.

== See also ==
- List of National Trust properties in Somerset
