= Martock =

Village in Somerset, England

Coordinates: 50.9704°N 2.7653°W

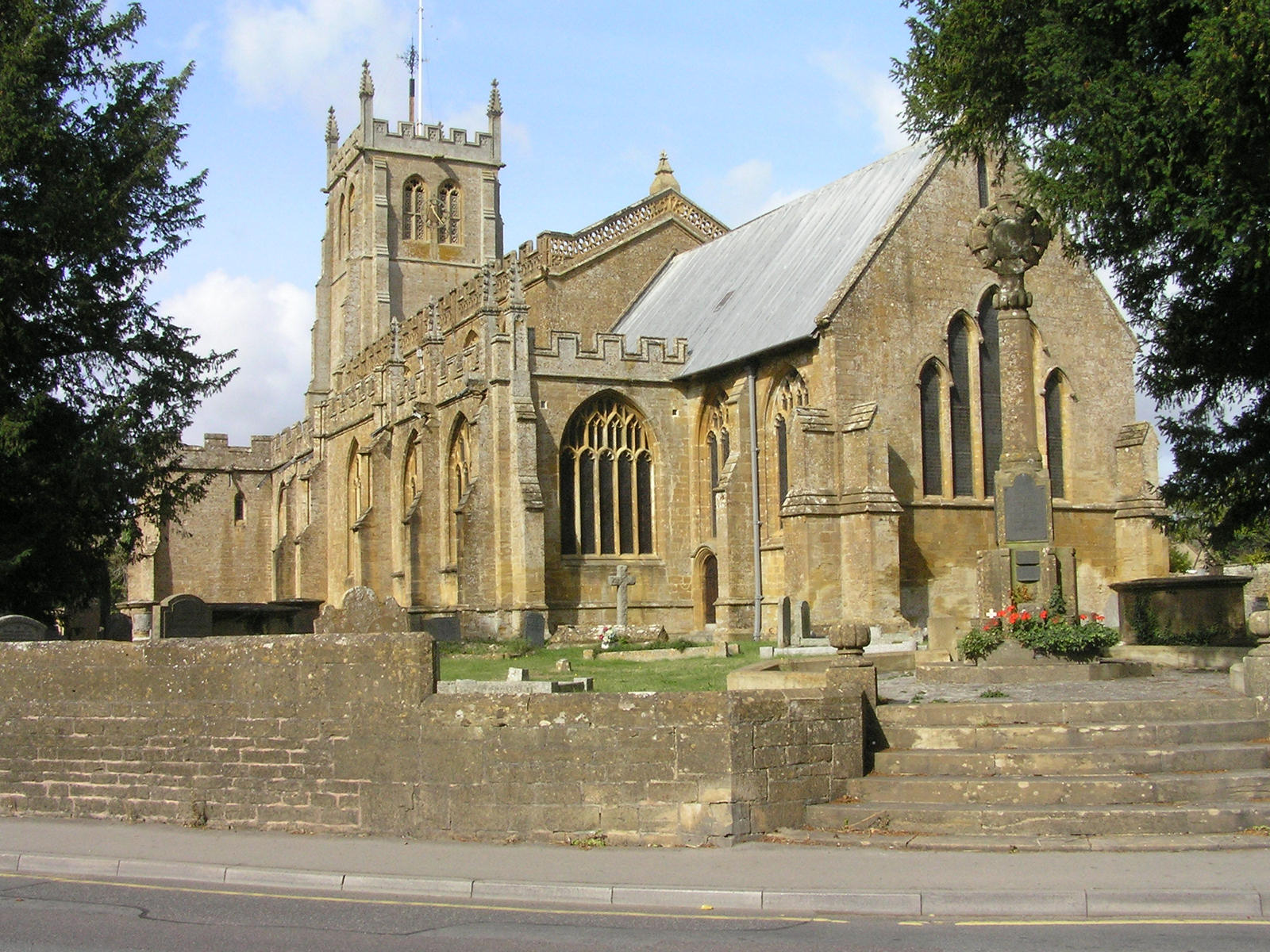
- All Saints' Church

- Location within Somerset
- Population: 4,766 (2011)
- OS grid reference: ST463192
- Unitary authority: Somerset
- Ceremonial county: Somerset
- Region: South West
- Country: England
- Sovereign state: United Kingdom
- Post town: MARTOCK
- Postcode district: TA12
- Dialling code: 01935
- Police: Avon and Somerset
- Fire: Devon and Somerset
- Ambulance: South Western
- UK Parliament: Glastonbury and Somerton

Martock is a large village and civil parish in Somerset, England. It is situated on the edge of the Somerset Levels, 7 miles (11.3 km) north-west of Yeovil in the South Somerset district. The parish includes Hurst, approximately one mile south of the village, and Bower Hinton, which is located to the west; the village is bounded by Hurst and the A303. Martock has a population of 4,766 and was historically a market town.

== History ==
=== Toponymy ===
Martock was known in the Domesday Book of 1086 as Mertoch. It means 'Rising bright from the shining sea' from the Old English 'meretorht'. It was the property of Queen Edith (Eagdith), wife of Godwin and mother of Earl Harold (Harold II). By 1066 it was the property of Queen Edith, wife of Edward the Confessor. The word root 'Mer-’ can also refer to 'a boundary or shore line' from the Old English 'maere'. It is possible that the name included the Old English element 'stoc' meaning 'by a lake'.

An alternative theory to the origin of the name Martock comes from the Old English words "mart" meaning market and "ac" for oak. This might relate to an oak tree on the spot now occupied by the Market House or more precisely the column there. Ekwall suggested that the name derives from 'merkestoc' meaning 'a place on a boundary'. However, Prebendary G.W. Saunders, vicar of Martock from 1917 to 1951, cites two more possibilities. Firstly, from Collinson, who wrote in 1790, that the name Martock is derived from 'market oak'. But unfortunately Martock was not granted a market until 1247 and long before that it was called by this name. His second suggestion is that the name is derived from a Celtic personal name 'Merti', who gave his name to a settlement, hence Merti-oc, the settlement of Merti. Both of these seem to be flights of fancy.

Bower Hinton was called 'Hanton Mertoc' in 1225 and 'Burhenton' in 1280. 'Hinton' meaning a poor enclosure, from the Old English 'hean' and 'tun'.

Newton means the new enclosure from the Old English 'niwe' and 'tun'. The medieval hamlet of Newton, which lay between Bower Hinton and Hurst, was first referred to in 1327. Stapleton was first recorded in 1195. It means the steep enclosure from the Old English 'steap' and 'tun'. Alternatively it may be from the Old English 'stapel' and 'tun', meaning 'settlement by a post'.

=== Domesday Book ===
Martock had a single entry in the Domesday Book and expanded rapidly in the succeeding years to include dependent settlements at Bower Hinton, Hurst, Newton, Coat, Stapleton, Ash, Witcombe, Milton and Long Load, expanding between 1086 and 1302 from 89 tenants to more than 200. It was the only parish in the Martock Hundred.

=== Later history ===
In 1810, 1,025 acres of common land were enclosed as a result of the Inclosure Acts.

The village was once a junction on local branches of the Great Western Railway, now dismantled.

== Governance ==
The parish council has responsibility for local issues, including setting an annual precept (local rate) to cover the council's operating costs and producing annual accounts for public scrutiny. The parish council evaluates local planning applications; it works with the local police, district council officers and neighbourhood watch groups on matters of crime, security, and traffic. The parish council's role also includes initiating projects for the maintenance and repair of parish facilities, as well as consulting with the district council on the maintenance, repair and improvement of highways, drainage, footpaths, public transport and street cleaning. Conservation matters (including trees and listed buildings) and environmental issues are also the responsibility of the council.

For local government purposes, since 1 April 2023, the parish comes under the unitary authority of Somerset Council. Prior to this, it was part of the non-metropolitan district of South Somerset (established under the Local Government Act 1972). It was part of Yeovil Rural District before 1974.

An electoral ward exists in the same name. Although Martock is the most populous area the ward stretches north to Long Load. The total population of this ward taken at the 2011 census was 5,724.

It is also part of the Glastonbury and Somerton county constituency represented in the House of Commons of the Parliament of the United Kingdom. It elects one member of parliament (MP) by the first past the post system of election.

== Economy ==
Local businesses include arts and crafts (stonemasonry, woodworking, silversmithing) a reclamation yard, and a fish and chip shop. Historically a market town, these days a monthly farmers market is held in Martock.

== Landmarks ==
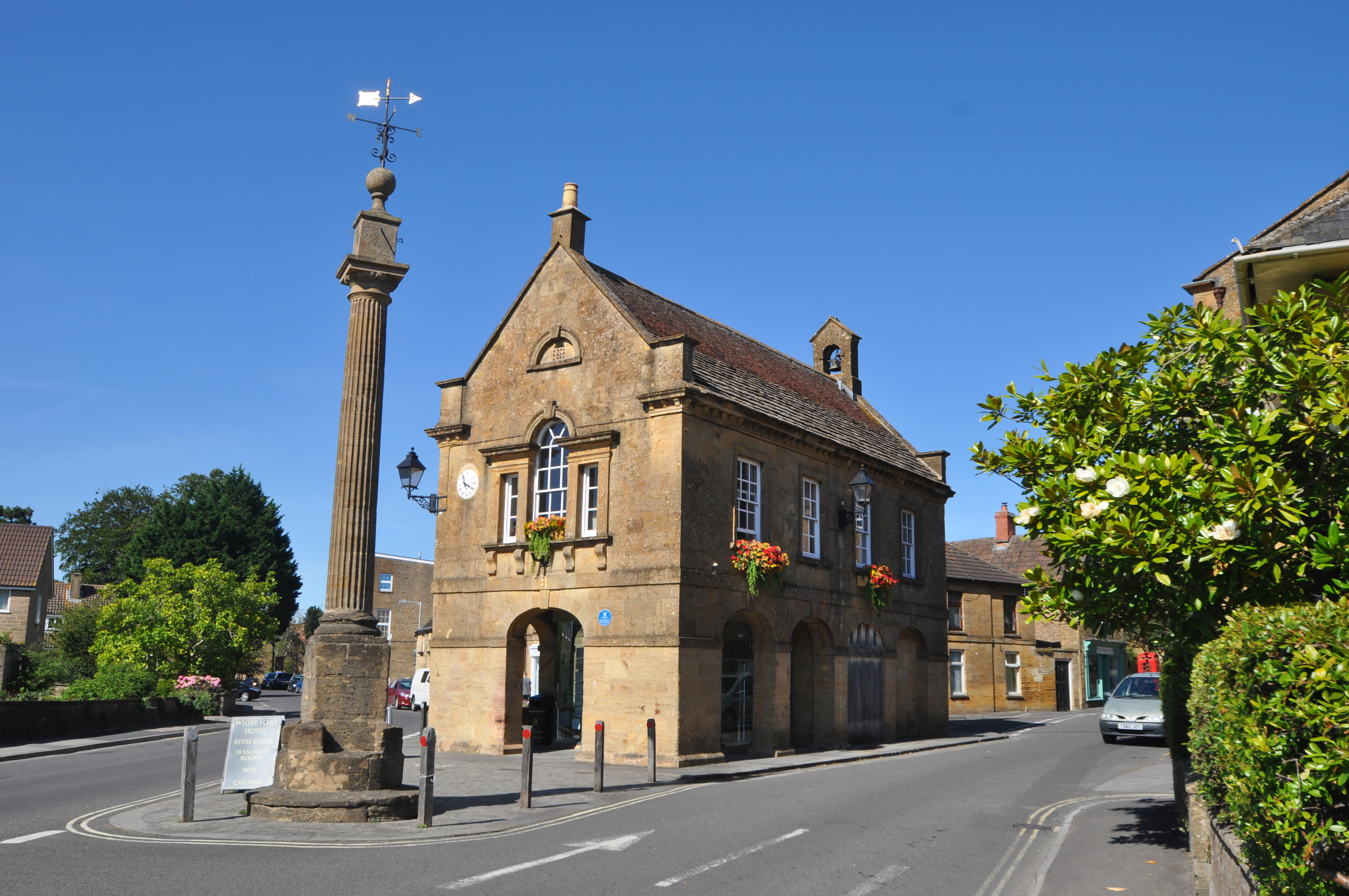
The Market House and cross

The Treasurer's House is a National Trust-owned property, built from hamstone during the 13th century.

Notable dwelling houses include Church Lodge. Local places of interest include the Burrow Hill Cider Farm.

The Parrett Iron Works was a series of industrial buildings next to the River Parrett. The site was originally named Carey's Mill and the adjoining bridge is called Carey's Mill Bridge, which was built of hamstone in the 18th century. The Iron Works was founded in 1855, on the site of a former snuff mill. The site included a foundry, with a prominent chimney, ropewalk, workshops and several smaller workshops and cottages. The sluice which powered the waterwheel and sluice keepers cottage still exist.

The hamstone Market House on Church Street was completed about 1785. It is a Grade II listed building. A grant of £190,000 was obtained from the Heritage Lottery Fund to restore the building and establish a community office on the ground floor in 2008. In front of the Market House is a Market Cross, also known as The Pinnacle, with a column which dates from 1741 with a fluted Tuscan order column, on a stepped plinth, which supports a ball finial crowned with a wrought iron weathervane.

Madey Mill is a Grade II* listed watermill with medieval origins. The current buildings date from the 17th century. It has suffered from a lack of maintenance and has been placed on the Heritage at Risk Register.

== Religious sites ==
The Church of All Saints dates from the 13th century. It was acquired by the Treasurer of Wells Cathedral in 1227 and he became the rector and patron of the church. The church was restored by Benjamin Ferrey, who was architect to the Diocese of Bath and Wells from 1841 until his death, and also in 1883–84 by Ewan Christian. The tower was built in four stages, to replace the previous one over the central crossing. It has offset corner buttresses to the full height of the tower. The church has been designated by English Heritage as a Grade I listed building. It is said to be the second largest in Somerset and has unique carved wooden statues in the eaves.

== Transport ==
South West Coaches operates the 52 bus route, which connects the village with Yeovil and Bower Hinton. There are also four routes to serve local school and college students.

Martock railway station was a stop on the Yeovil-Taunton line between 1853 and 1964; the station building has since been demolished but the Railway Hotel remains extant as a public house.

The B3165 bisects the village from north to south; it connects the A372 with the A303.

== Notable people ==
- Arthur Lakes (1844–1917) Born in Martock. Geologist, paleontologist, artist, writer, teacher and minister. Accidentally involved in the Bone Wars (Great Dinosaur Rush).
