= Coate =

Coate may refer to:

- Coate, Swindon – a former hamlet, now part of Swindon, England
  - Coate Water Country Park
- Coate, Wiltshire – a village in Bishops Cannings parish, Wiltshire, England
- Coate (surname)

== See also ==
- Coates (disambiguation)
