= Natasha Coates =

British disability gymnast

Natasha Coates (born in Warrington c. 1995) is a British disability gymnast, and the winner of 27 British elite gymnastics titles (as of Nov 2022). She also has 48 British medals to her name.

Coates, from Nottingham, England, was diagnosed at age 18 with mast cell activation syndrome (MCAS), a rare immunological condition which causes her body to respond to various stimuli with potentially life-threatening reactions; she also has been diagnosed with autism.

MCAS complicates her gymnastics practice in many ways, including making it impossible for her to feel her arms and legs when exercising, therefore not knowing whether she has landed on or caught an apparatus correctly, which often results in falls, cuts and other injuries. She is also at high risk of anaphylaxis.
