= Coates =

Coates may refer to:

== People ==
- Coates (surname)

== Places ==
=== United Kingdom ===
- Coates, Cambridgeshire
- Coates, Gloucestershire
- Coates, Lancashire
- Coates, Nottinghamshire
- Coates, West Sussex
- Coates by Stow, in Lincolnshire
- Coates Castle, a Grade II listed manor in West Sussex

=== United States ===
- Coates, Minnesota

== Other ==
- Coates graph, a kind of flow graph associated with the solution of a system of linear equations
- Coates Hire, an Australian equipment hire company
- Coates (supercomputer), a supercomputer at Purdue University
- Coates' disease, occasional spelling for Coats' disease, a rare human eye disorder

== See also ==
- Coate (disambiguation)
- Cotes (disambiguation)
- Coats (disambiguation)
- Great Coates, a village and civil parish in North East Lincolnshire, England
