= Simon Coates =

Simon Coates may refer to:

- Simon Coates (actor), British actor
- Simon Coates (artist), British artist
