= El Asher University =

Undergraduate university in Egypt

Coordinates: 30.3064°N 31.7591°E

- جامعة العاشر; Gāmaʿat al-ʿAsher
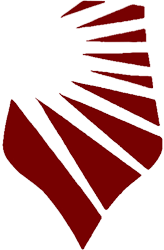
- EAU logo
- Type: Private
- Active: 2009–2013
- President: Prof.Dr. Moustafa Zaki Zahran
- Academic staff: 50
- Undergraduates: 200
- Location: El Asher City, Egypt
- Campus: Urban
- Website: eau.edu.eg
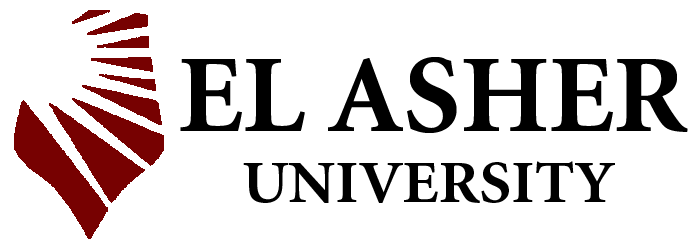
- EAU logo

El Asher University (EAU) (Arabic: جامعة العاشر من رمضان) was an undergraduate university located in El Asher City. Established in 2009 and was founded as a branch of Higher Technological Institute in 2009 and then became an independent University after 2011 Egyptian revolution.

== Faculties ==
- Pharmacy
- Nursing
- Engineering

== Transport ==
Air conditioned buses were provided by the university to and from campus.

== Banking services ==
The Commercial International Bank (C.I.B) campus branch was situated in the registration building. The bank offered students a full range of financial services.

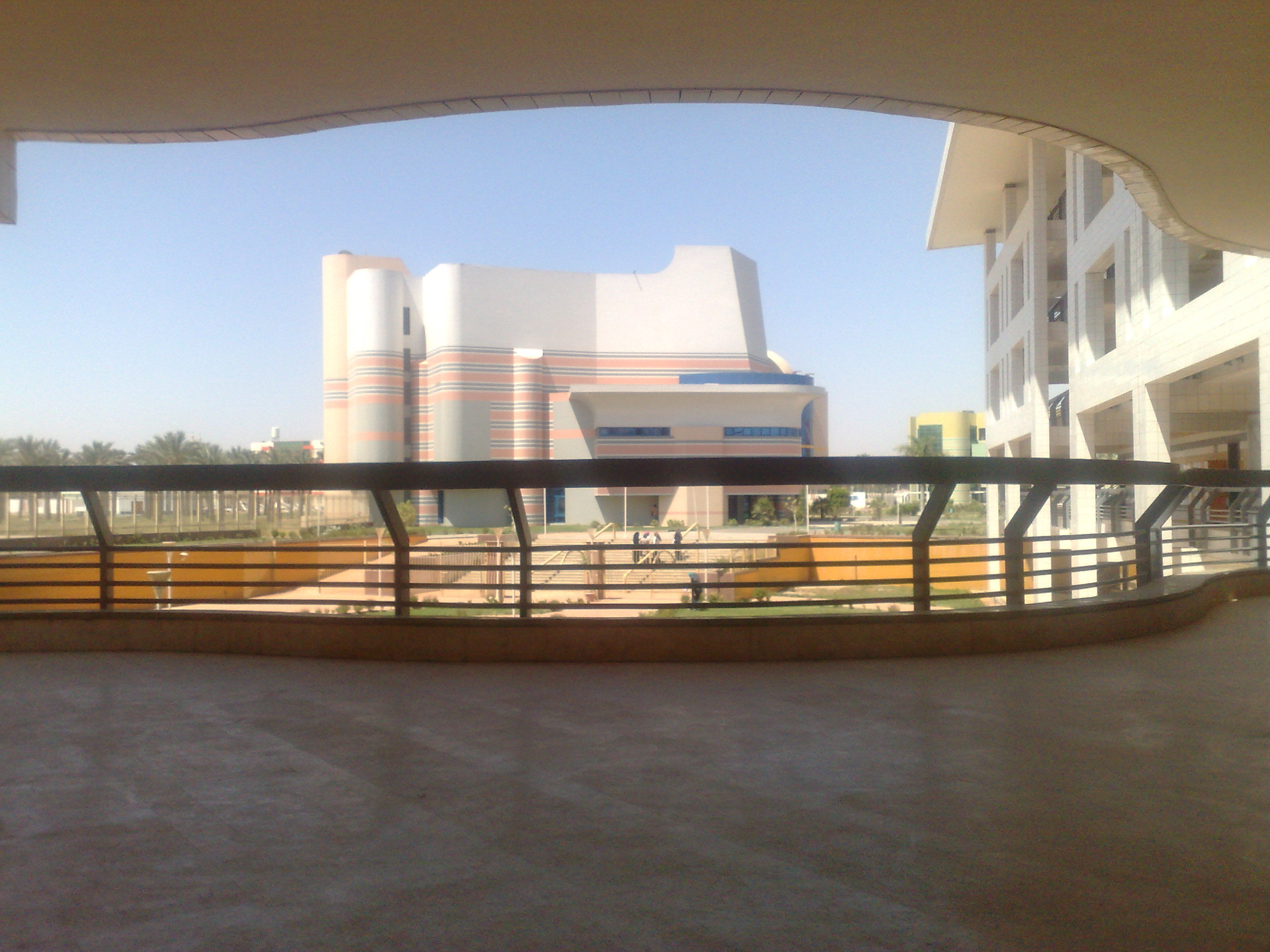
The former campus of El Asher University

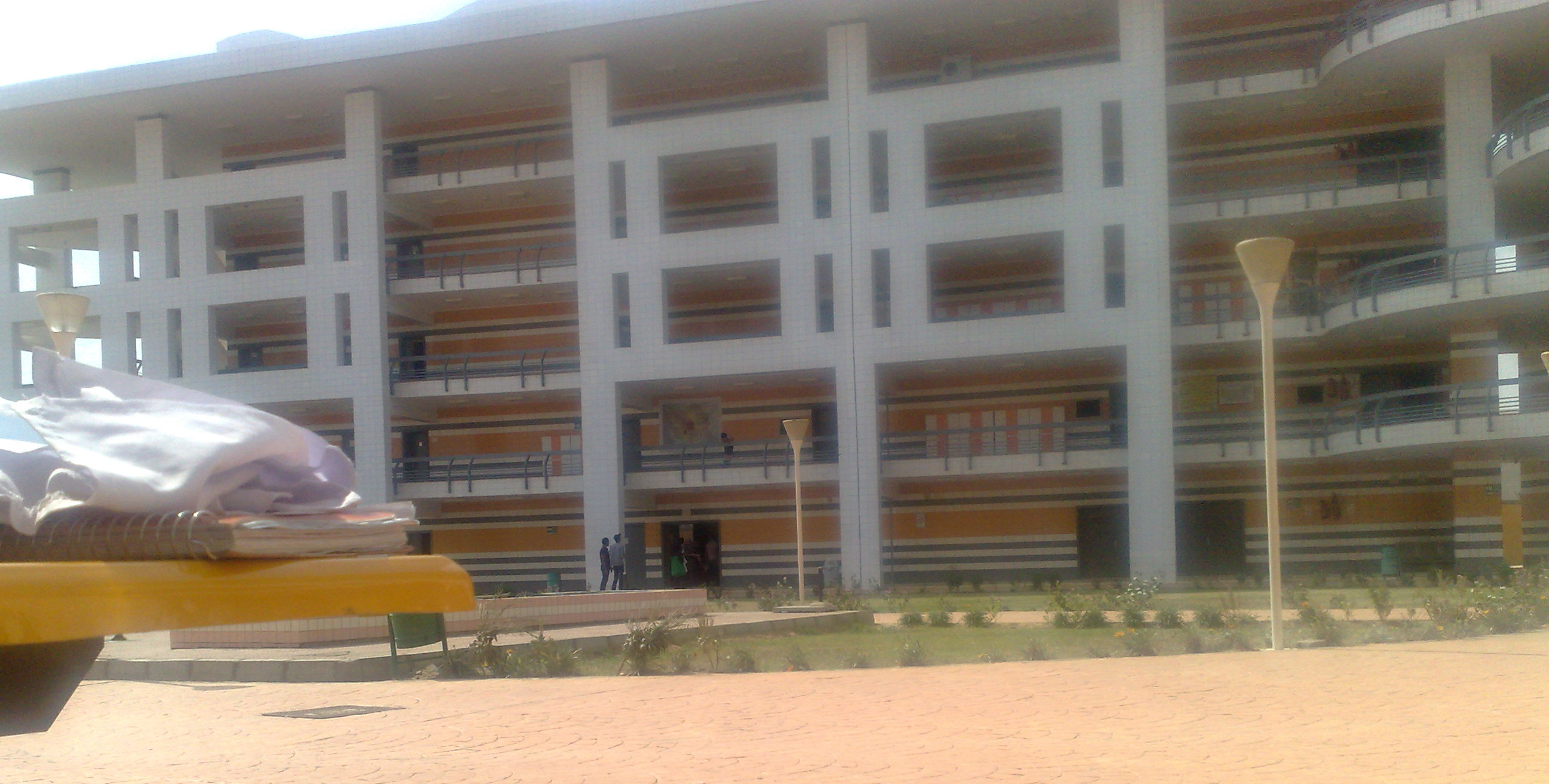
School of Pharmacy, former building

== See also ==
- Education in Egypt
