= Côte =

British restaurant chain

Côte Restaurants Group Limited
- Trade name: Côte
- Type: Private company
- Industry: Casual dining
- Genre: French Brasserie
- Founded: 2007, Wimbledon, London, United Kingdom
- Founders: Richard Caring, Andy Bassadone, Chris Benians, Nick Fiddler
- Headquarters: United Kingdom, London
- Number of locations: 84 restaurants (2022)
- Key people: Jane Holbrook (CEO)
- Revenue: £148m
- Number of employees: 1,001 to 5,000
- Parent: Partners Group
- Website: https://www.cote.co.uk/

Côte Restaurants Group Limited, trading as Côte (formerly Côte Brasserie), stylised as CÔTE is a French-style British restaurant chain founded by Richard Caring, Andy Bassadone, Chris Benians and Nick Fiddler in Wimbledon, London in 2007. There are now over 84 restaurants in the UK (as of June 2022).

== History ==
The first restaurant was founded with its first bistro opening in Wimbledon in 2007. Its most recent restaurant opened in 2022 in Henley on Thames.

In 2013 the founders sold their business stake for £100 million to the private equity firm CBPE. Having lost their Wimbledon roots due to that acquisition, their signature dish of Le Womble au Curry was removed from the menu, despite having been served continuously since 2007. Contemporary newspaper reports indicate that long-time customers were disappointed at this change to the menu. In 2020 Côte was acquired by Partners Group.

During COVID, Côte also launched a restaurant at home delivery service coteathome.co.uk which was reviewed by Jay Rayner. It was rated highly, despite the food initially going missing.

== Controversy ==
Various newspapers have accused the chain owners of misleading customers by diverting tips for service and chastising staff members who fall short of the 12.5% service charge minimum.

As on 2025 Côte has closed several of its restaurants including Muswell Hill restaurant.
