= The Cote Photo =

2026 American documentary film

- Directed by: Adam Pillon
- Produced by: Megan Woomer
- Starring: Sergio Loaiza; Esteban Carranza; Leslie Kean
- Production company: Great Films LLC
- Release date: September 4, 2026
- Running time: 76 minutes
- Country: United States
- Languages: English; Spanish

The Cote Photo is a 2026 American documentary film directed by Adam Pillon and produced by Megan Woomer. The film examines an aerial photograph taken on September 4, 1971 during a government mapping flight over Lake Cote in northern Costa Rica, in which one frame shows a circular or disc-shaped object above the lake. It was released on September 4, 2026, the 55th anniversary of the photograph.

== Synopsis ==
The film follows Esteban Carranza, a Costa Rican attorney and researcher of unidentified anomalous phenomena (UAP), who traces the history of the photograph from the national archive in San José to the mountains surrounding Lake Cote. Carranza's interest in the case stems from his late uncle's collection of UFO research materials, which included a contact copy of the original negative obtained from Costa Rica's National Geographic Institute. It features Sergio Loaiza, the cartographer who took the photograph. Carranza spent years building a relationship of trust with Loaiza, who at 83 gives one of his most extensive accounts of the 1971 flight on camera. Loaiza also describes UAP-related experiences he says he had earlier in his life.

Rather than centering on forensic analysis, the film focuses on personal accounts, including testimony from the survey crew, researchers who have studied the image, and experiencers from the Lake Cote area, such as Emi Galli and Kelli Kaos, who describe their own encounters.

== Background ==
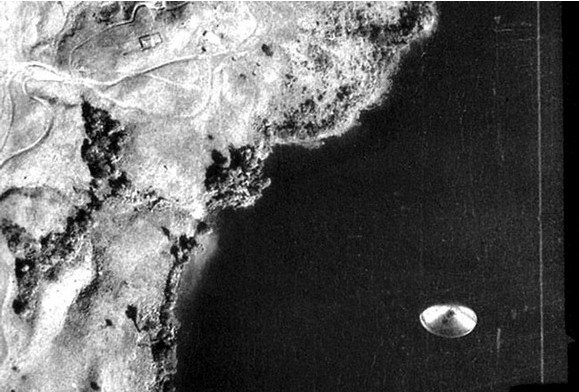
Cote UFO, 1971

On September 4, 1971, a government aircraft carried out an aerial mapping mission over Lake Cote as part of studies for a hydroelectric project near Arenal Volcano. The four-person crew consisted of photographer and cartographer Sergio Loaiza, pilot Omar Arias, geographer Juan Bravo and topographer Francisco Reyes, none of whom reported seeing anything unusual during the flight. Loaiza operated a large German-made aerial mapping camera mounted in the underside of the aircraft. When the negatives were developed, frame 300 of the sequence showed the object, while frames 299 and 301, taken immediately before and after, did not. Loaiza later said that he and his colleagues were told not to discuss the photograph publicly.

The photograph became one of the most studied cases in UAP research. Jacques Vallée obtained the original negative from the Costa Rican government in the 1980s, and he and former NASA Ames researcher Richard F. Haines published two papers on it in the Journal of Scientific Exploration in 1989 and 1990. No definitive public conclusion has been reached about what the object was. The film's producers argue that the case is significant because it is an official photograph taken on film during a mapping mission, with a chain of custody preserved in the Costa Rican national archive.

== Production ==
The Cote Photo is the first feature film by Pillon and Woomer, a married filmmaking couple based in Detroit. According to Pillon, the project began after Woomer saw a print of the photograph hanging in a friend's home near Arenal Volcano. Filming took place in Costa Rica, Kansas and New York City.

The film includes an interview with investigative journalist Leslie Kean, a co-author of the 2017 New York Times report on the Pentagon's Advanced Aerospace Threat Identification Program. It also features analyst Michael Strickland, a Kansas-based photographer who in 2022 produced a drum scan of Carranza's contact copy of the original negative, in an effort led by Carranza to obtain a high-resolution scan.

== Release ==
The Cote Photo was released on September 4, 2026, on Apple TV, and was later made available on Amazon Prime Video. It runs 76 minutes and was released in English and Spanish in more than 80 countries, including France, Germany, Austria, Spain and Japan, as well as across Latin America. Subtitles are available in several languages, including German, French, and Japanese. In Australia, the film was classified G (General) by the Australian Classification Board on June 30, 2026.

== See also ==
- Lake Cote
