= Elaine J. Coates =

American social worker and educator (1937–2026)

- Born: September 15, 1937; Baltimore, Maryland, U.S.
- Died: February 14, 2026 (aged 88)
- Education: University of Maryland, College Park (BA)
- Occupations: Social worker, educator
- Known for: First African American graduate of University of Maryland

Elaine Johnson Coates (September 15, 1937 – February 14, 2026) was an American social worker and educator. She was the first African American woman to graduate from the University of Maryland, College Park.

== Life and career ==
Coates was born in Baltimore, Maryland, on September 15, 1937. She was the daughter of a domestic worker and railroad porter and attended the then-segregated Frederick Douglass High School. Following the Brown v. Board of Education Supreme Court ruling, Coates enrolled in the University of Maryland in 1955 where she was one of the few African American undergraduates allowed to live on campus. Her high school counselor refused to write Coates a letter of recommendation suggesting she find a job instead; at her mother's urging, Coates wrote her own letter, ultimately earning a four-year scholarship. She resided in Caroline Hall and would frequently receive threats and insults, and frequently received unfair treatment from her professors. She was a member of the Red Cross Club. Coates graduated in 1959 from the College of Education. She was the first undergraduate African American student to graduate from University of Maryland, College Park. (Note: Coates was not the first African American student admitted to the University of Maryland, as Hiram Whittle had entered 4 years before her, in 1951. Six other black students entered in the same class as Coates in 1955. Both Whittle and those who began with Coates dropped out within a year of their admittance, leaving her as the first African American to graduate.)

Coates went on to become a social worker and educator. She spent some time teaching at the high school that she herself had attended, but later earned a master's degree in social work and also obtained her certification as a Licensed Certified Social Worker–Clinical (LCSW-C). She went on to work in providing social services to pediatric and adult trauma patients at the Johns Hopkins Hospital. After retiring in 2006, she continued counseling as a volunteer.

Her daughter and son also attended the University of Maryland.

Coates died on February 14, 2026, at the age of 88.

== Awards and honors ==
In April, 2019, Coates was the first to receive the University of Maryland Alumni Association's new annual award meant "to recognize an individual who has made significant contributions to fostering diversity and inclusion nationally and globally." The award was then named in her honor, the "Elaine Johnson Coates Award."

In May, 2019, Coates was honored at the University of Maryland graduation ceremony. Addressing the crowd, Coates said, "I stand on this podium and look at the diversity in the beautiful faces of the graduation class... and it tells me that my journey mattered.

Coates received an honorary doctorate from the University of Maryland in May, 2020.

In July, 2020, University of Maryland president Darryll Pines announced that one of the university's new residence halls would be named to honor Coates having been the university's first African-American woman to graduate.

== See also ==
- List of African-American firsts
