= Darcy Coates =

Australian author

- Born: Australia
- Occupation: Writer
- Notable work: Gravekeeper series

Darcy Coates is an Australian author of horror, gothic horror, thriller, and suspense.

== Career ==
Coates began self-publishing in 2013 with the novella Once Returned, after which she continued to self-publish novels through Amazon’s Kindle Direct Publishing program. In 2015 Coates published The Haunting of Gillespie House, which sold better than any of her prior works. Sales of her books continued to increase and around 2019, Coates was contacted by Sourcebooks for a book deal. They obtained the rights to her prior titles, which they published through their imprint Poisoned Pen Press.

== Bibliography ==
=== House of Shadows ===
- House of Shadows (2015)
- House of Secrets (2016)

=== Cymic Parasite Breach ===
- Station 331 (2016)
- Station 332 (2016)
- Station 333 (2016)
- Station 334 (2016)
- Station 335 (2016)

=== Black Winter ===
- Voices in the Snow (2019)
- Secrets in the Dark (2020)
- Whispers in the Mist (2020)
- Silence in the Shadows (2020)

=== Gravekeeper ===
- The Whispering Dead (2021)
- The Ravenous Dead (2022)
- The Twisted Dead (2023)
- The Hollow Dead (2024)
- The Vengeful Dead (2025)

=== Standalone novels and novellas ===
- Once Returned (2013)
- Ghost Camera (2014)
- Sub Basement (2014)
- Dead Lake (2015)
- The Haunting of Blackwood House (2015)
- The Haunting of Gillespie House (2015)
- The Haunting of Ashburn House (2016)
- The Folcroft Ghosts (2017)
- The House Next Door (2017)
- The Haunting of Rookward House (2017)
- Craven Manor (2017)
- The Carrow Haunt (2018)
- Hunted (2018)
- Bellamy (2019)
- The Haunting of Leigh Harker (2021)
- The Cathedral (2022)
- Clockwork (2022)
- From Below (2022)
- Gallows Hill (2022)
- Dead of Winter (2023)
- Where He Can't Find You (2023)
- How Bad Things Can Get (2025)

=== Short stories ===
- "The Mannequin: A Horror Short Story" (2014)
- "Whose Woods These Are: A Horror Short Story" (2014)
- "Lights Out" (2015)
- "The Haunting of Graham House" (companion story to The Haunting of Blackwood House)
- "Crawlspace" (2015)
- "Crypt" (2015)

=== Collections ===
- Bites 1 (2015)
- Bites 2 (2015)
- Bites 3 (2015)
- Bites 4 (2015)
- Bites 5 (2015)
- Parasite (2016, omnibus of Cymic Parasite Breach)
