= Roger A. Coate =

American political scientist

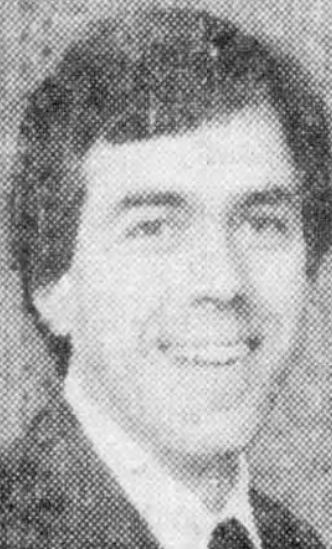
- Coate in 1986
- Born: United States
- Education: Bowling Green University; Johns Hopkins University; Ohio State University
- Occupation: Political scientist

Roger A. Coate is an American political scientist.

== Life and career ==
Coate was born in the United States. He attended Bowling Green University, graduating in 1971. After graduating, he attended Johns Hopkins University, earning his M.A. degree in international relations in 1973. He also attended Ohio State University, earning his PhD degree in political science in 1977.

Coate served as a professor in the department of political science at the University of South Carolina from 2001 to 2008. During his years as a professor, in 2008, he was named a distinguished professor.
