= John Coates =

John Coates may refer to:

== Entertainment ==
- John Coates (producer) (1927–2012), producer of The Snowman and other animated TV features
- John Coates (tenor) (1865–1941), English tenor
- John Coates Jr. (1938–2017), American jazz pianist

== Sports ==
- John Coates (cricketer) (1828–1870), English cricketer
- John Coates (footballer) (born 1944), football goalkeeper
- John Coates (sports administrator) (born 1950), Australian solicitor, president of the Australian Olympic Committee

== Others ==
- John H. Coates (1945–2022), Australian mathematician
- John Coates (naval architect) (1922–2010), British naval architect and historian
- John M. Coates, neuroscientist at the University of Cambridge
- John Coates (politician) (born 1944), Australian senator for Tasmania
- John Coates (general) (1932–2018), officer in the Australian Army
- John Coates (businessman) (born 1970), joint chief executive of online gambling company bet365 and joint chairman of Stoke City

== See also ==
- John Coats (1906–1979), theosophist
- Jonathan Coates (born 1975), Welsh professional footballer
- John Coates Carter (1859–1927), English architect
