= Eau =

Eau or EAU may refer to:

- The French word for water
  - O (Cirque du Soleil), a water-themed stage production
- Eau (trigraph), a trigraph of the Latin script
- EAU, the IATA code for the Chippewa Valley Regional Airport in Wisconsin, United States
- East Africa University, a private university in Puntland, Somalia
- El Asher University, an undergraduate university in the Sharqia Governorate, Egypt
- Emergency assessment unit (EAU), a short-stay department in a hospital
- Estimated annual usage (EAU)
- European Association of Urology, a non-profit organisation of urology professionals
- Initiative: Eau, an American nonprofit, non-governmental organization
- River Eau, a tributary of the River Trent in Lincolnshire, England
- Uganda, license plate code
