= Coundon Gate =

Village in County Durham, England

Coordinates: 54.662°N 1.649°W

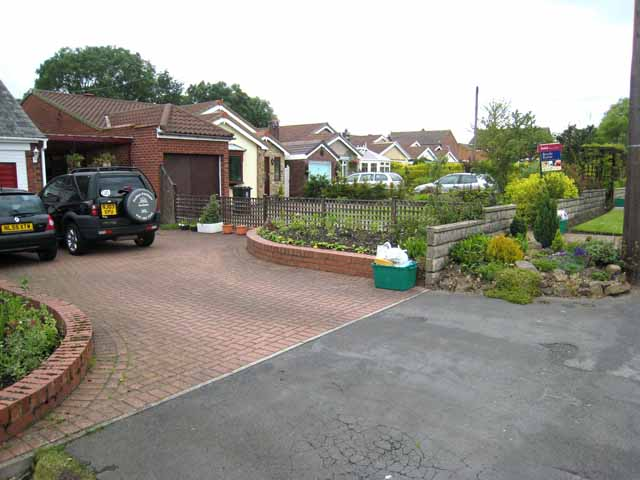
Housing on Bracks Road

Coundon Gate (also known as Coundongate) is a small village in County Durham, in England. It is situated between Bishop Auckland and Coundon.
