= Coswinsawsin =

Hamlet in Cornwall, England

Coordinates: 50.1979°N 5.3292°W

Coswinsawsin: Cornish: Koswynnsowson
- Location within Cornwall
- OS grid reference: SW625384
- Civil parish: Gwinear-Gwithian
- Unitary authority: Cornwall
- Ceremonial county: Cornwall
- Region: South West
- Country: England
- Sovereign state: United Kingdom
- Post town: Camborne
- Postcode district: TR14 0
- Police: Devon and Cornwall
- Fire: Cornwall
- Ambulance: South Western

Coswinsawsin (Cornish: Koswynnsowson, meaning fair white wood of the Englishman) is a hamlet in the parish of Gwinear-Gwithian (where the 2011 Census population was included ), Cornwall, UK.
