= Lake Cote =

- Location in Costa Rica
- Coordinates: 10.581389°N 84.911667°W
- Type: crater lake
- Max. length: 1 km (0.62 mi)
- Surface area: 1.983 km^{2} (0.766 sq mi)
- Max. depth: 18 m (59 ft)
- Surface elevation: 680 m (2,230 ft)

Lake Cote (Spanish: Lago Cote), originally known as Lake Cóter, is a fresh water crater lake located in the northern highlands of Costa Rica. It is currently the largest natural lake in Costa Rica at 1.98 square kilometres (0.76 mi^{2}). Its depth varies between 6 and 18 m (20 and 59 ft).

== Location ==
Situated in Cote district, Guatuso canton, of Alajuela province, between the Arenal Volcano and Tenorio Volcano, Lake Cote is located near the largest overall lake in Costa Rica, Lake Arenal, which was artificially increased in size in 1979.

== Physical aspects ==
It is a maar-based crater lake with a heartlike, ovoid shape and a 1 km (0.62 mi) diameter. The average depth is 6.30 m (20.7 ft), with a maximum depth of 18 m (59 ft) near the center.

It is the natural drainage of River Cote.

The average water temperature ranges between 21.9 and 27.9 °C (71 and 82 °F).

== Uses ==
The lake is used for tourism, subsistence fishing, hydropower electricity generation, and as a conservation area. It is regarded as a sacred place by the local Maleku people.

== Cote UFO ==
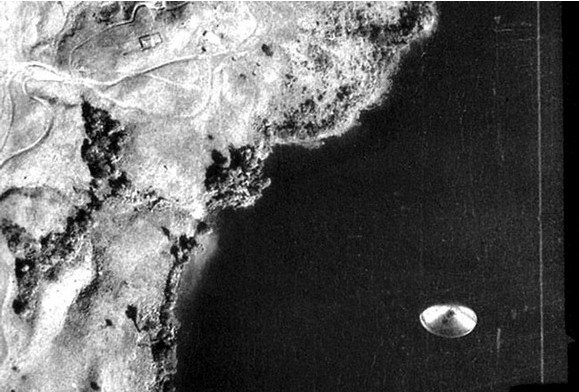
Cote UFO, 1971

On 4 September 1971, during an aerial survey by the National Geographic Institute of Costa Rica, what looks like a UFO was photographed over Lake Cote (see photo). Some believe the photograph only depicts the wake of a boat.

The Cote Photo, a documentary film directed by Adam Pillon and produced by Megan Woomer, investigates the 1971 photograph. The film was released on September 4, 2026, the 55th anniversary of the photograph.
