= Costislost =

Grade II listed house in Cornwall, England

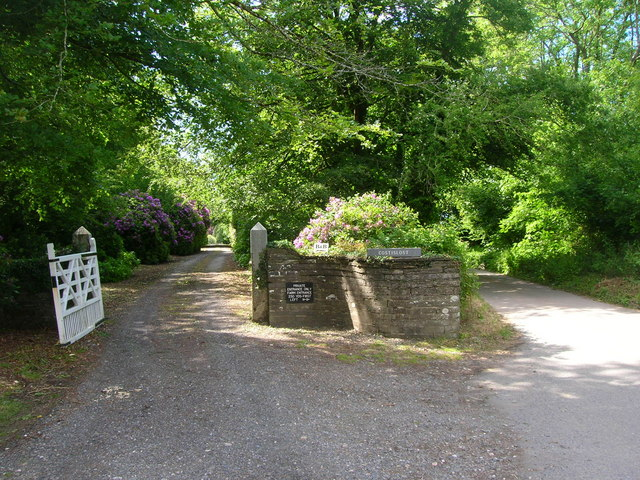
- The entrance to Costislost

- Location within Cornwall
- 50.4984°N 4.7819°W
- Location: Egloshayle, Cornwall, England

Listed Building – Grade II
- Official name: Costilost [sic] Farmhouse
- Designated: 4 November 1988
- Reference no.: 1311181

Costislost is a Grade II listed house in the parish of Egloshayle in Cornwall, England. To the south are Costislost Plantations. It dates to probably the 17th century, and underwent remodelling in the 18th and 19th centuries. The property was a farmhouse for centuries and belonged to the Lakeman family in the 19th century.

Today it is run as an organic retreat and nutritional health centre.
