= Ries Coté =

Dutch footballer (1946–2024)

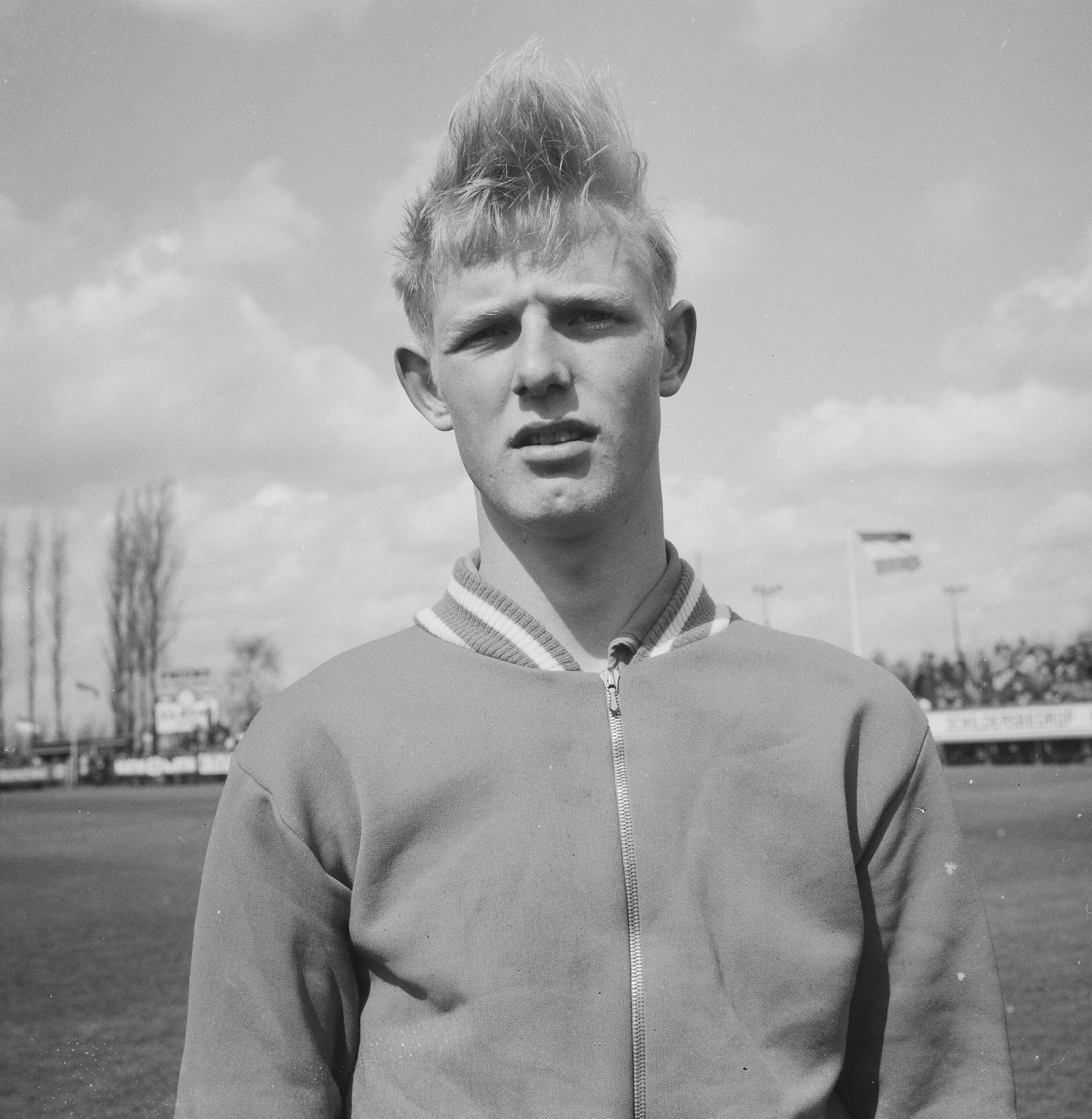
- Coté in 1965

Personal information
- Full name: Catharinus Marinus Coté
- Date of birth: 2 December 1946
- Place of birth: Utrecht, Netherlands
- Date of death: 1 January 2024 (aged 77)
- Place of death: Almere, Netherlands
- Position: Midfielder

Senior career*
Years	Team	Apps	(Gls)
1964–1970	Elinkwijk	150	(4)
1970–1978	Utrecht	173	(2)
Total		323	(6)
- * Club domestic league appearances and goals

Ries Coté (2 December 1946 – 1 January 2024) was a Dutch professional footballer who played as a midfielder for Elinkwijk and Utrecht.

== Career ==
Coté played for Elinkwijk between 1964 and 1970, and later for Utrecht until 1978.

== Death ==
Coté died in Almere on 1 January 2024, at the age of 77.
