= Long Load =

Village and civil parish in Somerset, England

Coordinates: 51.0083°N 2.7639°W

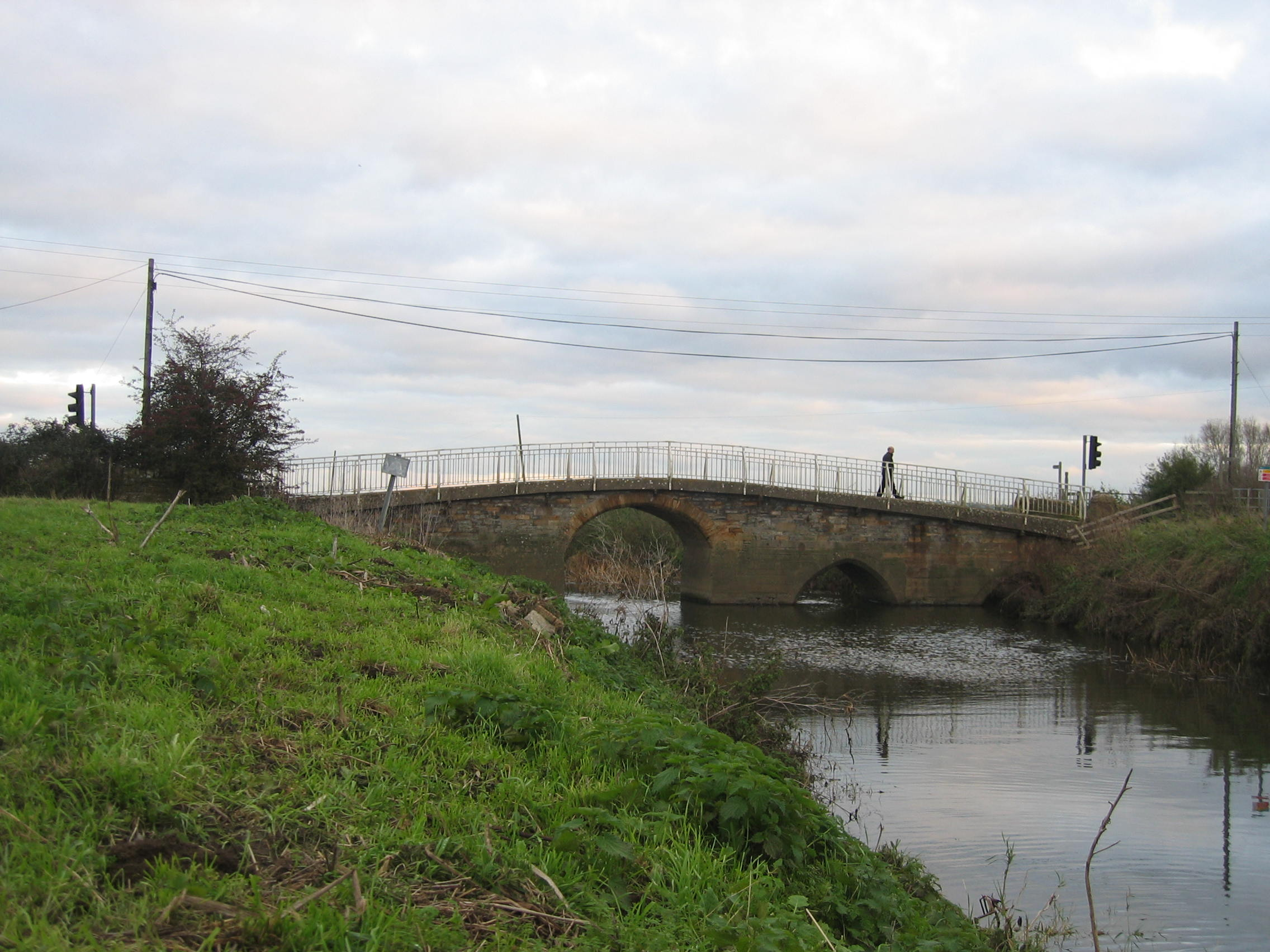
- The single-lane bridge at Long Load

- Location within Somerset
- Population: 332 (2011)
- OS grid reference: ST465235
- Unitary authority: Somerset Council
- Ceremonial county: Somerset
- Region: South West
- Country: England
- Sovereign state: United Kingdom
- Post town: Langport
- Postcode district: TA10
- Dialling code: 01458
- Police: Avon and Somerset
- Fire: Devon and Somerset
- Ambulance: South Western
- UK Parliament: Glastonbury and Somerton

Long Load is a village and parish in Somerset, England, situated on the River Yeo 5 miles (8.0 km) south of Somerton. The village has a population of 332.

== History ==
Long Load was recorded as ‘Lade’ in the late 12th century and ‘La Lade’ in 1285 meaning The watercourse or drainage channel from the Old English ‘lād’ or The long route (from) where goods were carried from the Old English lang and laed. It has also been suggested that the name derives from O.E. lad meaning a water-course.

Long Load's association with the river is long standing. A bridge over the river is known to have existed by 1335, while by 1448 there were wharves for the loading and unloading of cargoes from boats using the river. The current five arch bridge has medieval origins, but was rebuilt in the 18th century and widened in 1814 it cost of £452. It is a Scheduled Ancient Monument and has been designated as a Grade II* Listed building.

The river was the subject of the abortive Ivelchester and Langport Navigation in 1795, and although the works were never completed, traffic on the river was sufficient for the coal merchants Stukey and Bagehot to establish a coal yard near the bridge by 1824. Water levels were improved by work on the river below Langport, and the 1841 census records that a salt house had been constructed. By then, 88 households lived in Long Load, including a boatman called William Gillett and his family, while another boatman lived near the bridge. Cargoes arriving at the wharves included slates, bricks, tiles and coal, while the main export was timber.

The parish was created from the northern parts of the Martock parish in 1895, and was originally 'called Lade', or 'La Lade' taken from the Saxon word lade, meaning water course.

== Governance ==
The parish council has responsibility for local issues, including setting an annual precept (local rate) to cover the council's operating costs and producing annual accounts for public scrutiny. The parish council evaluates local planning applications and works with the local police, district council officers, and neighbourhood watch groups on matters of crime, security, and traffic. The parish council's role also includes initiating projects for the maintenance and repair of parish facilities, as well as consulting with the district council on the maintenance, repair, and improvement of highways, drainage, footpaths, public transport, and street cleaning. Conservation matters (including trees and listed buildings) and environmental issues are also the responsibility of the council.

For local government purposes, since 1 April 2023, the parish comes under the unitary authority of Somerset Council. Prior to this, it was part of the non-metropolitan district of South Somerset (established under the Local Government Act 1972). It was part of Yeovil Rural District before 1974.

It is also part of the Glastonbury and Somerton county constituency represented in the House of Commons of the Parliament of the United Kingdom. It elects one Member of Parliament (MP) by the first past the post system of election.

== Religious sites ==
In 1548 Long Load chapel was first mentioned, when it was one of the tithings of the parish of Martock. The first solid evidence of a church on the present site is a tablet in the vestry dated 1733, which states that lands were added here at that time.

The Anglican parish Christ Church was built in 1854–1856, by Charles Edmund Giles, replacing a chapel on the site which was first recorded 1418.

The church at Long Load is no longer in use as a church by the parish and has now been sold and is in the process of being redeveloped into a family home.
