= Les Coteaux (Mulhouse) =

Public housing in Mulhouse, France

Coordinates: 47°44′09″N 7°17′51″E

Les Coteaux, also known as the ZUP de Dornach, is a cité HLM (council estate) in the west of the city of Mulhouse, Alsace, France.

== Social Housing Rehabilitation ==
In 2023, the city of Mulhouse adopted the urban renewal plan for the Coteau district. More than 80 housing units were purchased by the municipality, and some condominiums were demolished.

== See also ==
- HLM
- Public housing in France
