= William Coates (longevity claimant) =

American claimant as a supercentenarian

William Coates (June 2, 1911 – February 24, 2004) was an American man from Maryland who was an unverified claimant as a supercentenarian whose actual age was subsequently disputed.

Coates came to wider prominence when he was covered in a 1999 Washington Post article regarding a celebration of his 110th birthday, with some further coverage in 2002. When Coates died on 24 February 2004, The Washington Post reported that he had "nine children, 21 grandchildren and 37 great-grandchildren from two relationships".

On his death, news reports said Coates was believed to have been the oldest man in the United States aged 114 years, based upon his nursing home records that gave his year of birth as 1889. The reports noted there was no birth certificate, but also noted that a lack of a birth certificate would "not have been uncommon for African Americans of his generation".

The Washington Post quoted the director of a Maryland senior center who had done research on county centenarians as saying Coates was born June 2, 1889. If the claim was correct, Coates was the world's oldest person after the death of Mitoyo Kawate, and its oldest man after the death of Yukichi Chuganji.

However, in March 2004, one week after Coates' death, The Washington Post ran a longer follow-up story which quoted the Gerontology Research Group (GRG) who said that a register of William J. Coates with his parents and siblings in the 1930 United States census listed his age as 18 years old. The census data would mean that Coates was 92 at the time of his death. The Washington Post noted in their March 2004 follow-up story that none of Coates' relatives had ever claimed he was 114, and that they knew little of his life. The Post quoted a distressed relative's reaction saying "The Post should have researched that [earlier, February 2004] story and gotten their facts straight before it was ever released in the first place".

In an interview with The Wall Street Journal in 2005, GRG Director Robert Young said regarding Coates that "We had so much information that he was lying", and "He was listed as eight years old in the 1920 Census and 18 in the 1930 Census".

== See also ==
- Centenarian
- Longevity claims
- Longevity traditions
- Supercentenarian
