= David Côté (politician) =

Canadian politician

Member of the National Assembly of Quebec for Rouyn-Noranda
- In office 1944–1948
- Preceded by: Riding created
- Succeeded by: Guy Dallaire

Personal details
- Born: February 10, 1915
- Died: March 8, 1969 (aged 54)
- Party: Parti social démocratique du Québec (?–1945); Independent (1945–1948)
- Occupation: Trade unionist

David Côté (February 10, 1915 – March 8, 1969) was a Canadian politician in Quebec. Côté was the only member of the Fédération du Commonwealth Coopératif (the Quebec section of the Co-operative Commonwealth Federation) ever elected to the Legislative Assembly of Quebec.

Côté was a trade union organizer for the Congress of Industrial Organizations working amongst miners in Rouyn. He was elected to the legislative assembly as the CCF member for Rouyn-Noranda in the 1944 provincial election with 21% of the vote. He sat as an independent from July 22, 1945 until the end of his term and did not seek re-election in the 1948 election.
