= Coats Steam Car =

Prototype steam automobile of the early 1920s

Coats Steam Car Company
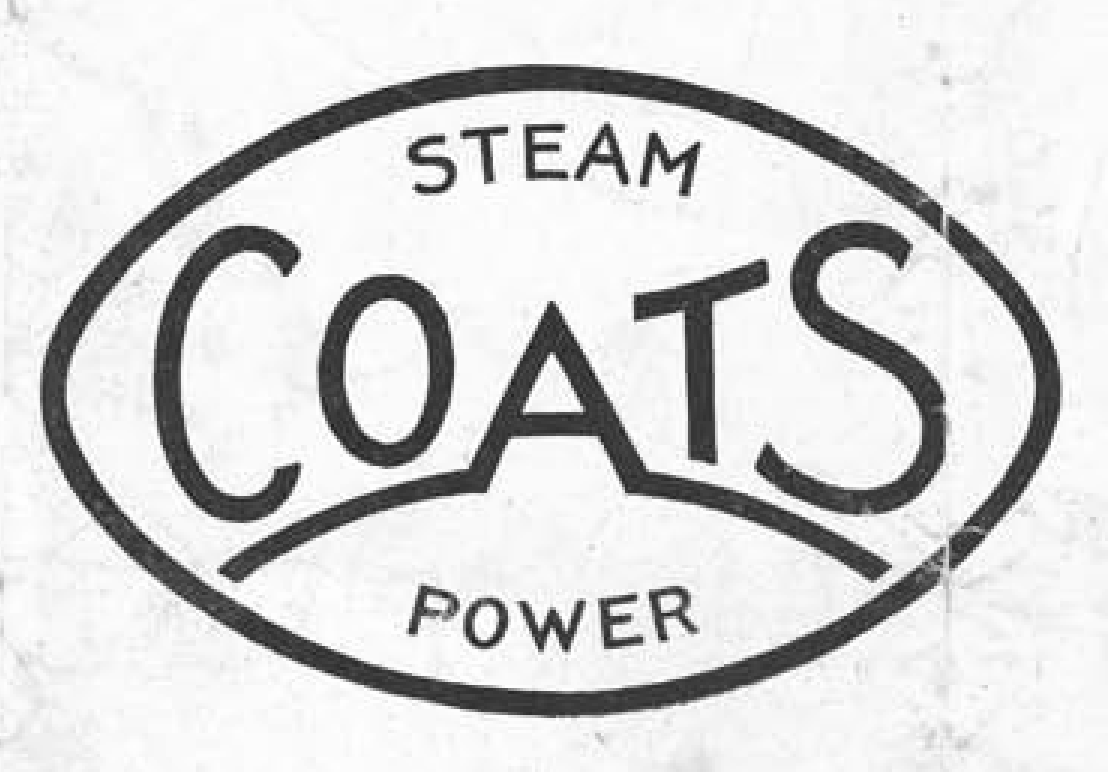
- Industry: Automotive
- Founded: 1921
- Defunct: 1923
- Headquarters: Bowling Green, Ohio, United States
- Area served: United States
- Key people: George A. Coats
- Products: Automobiles

The Coats Steam Car Company was an American steam automobile manufacturer based in Bowling Green, Ohio, United States. It was founded by George A. Coats. The company operated from 1921 to 1923.

== Models ==
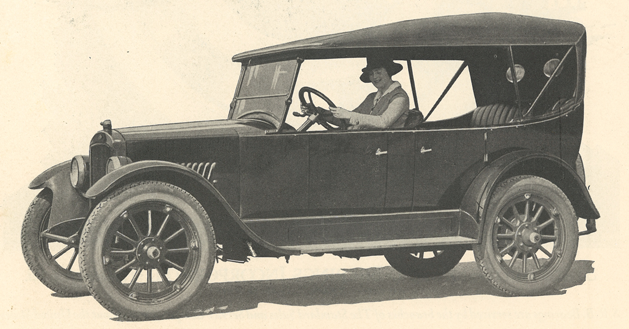
The 1923 Coats Steamer car.

A corporation was formed and perhaps two prototypes were assembled. Five incrementally different designs were described.

The first was by a "Norwegian engineer" and used two three-cylinder radial engines on the rear axle, one powering each wheel. The second was by James Yeikichi Sakuyama, for years an engine designer at Indianapolis, with a V-3 engine, gearbox and cast grid steam generator. It was quickly changed to a fire tube steam generator and inline-3 cylinder engine flat in the chassis. The fourth design took that Sakuyama chassis and engine and replaced the steam system in late 1923 with Charles A. French's patent design. The French-Coats was technically the most superior, probably the most likely to have been functional, and the car used in photographs. The fifth design was simply the chassis of Purdue professor Allen C. Staley, shown as a high grade Coats steam car at three shows.

== Business Plan ==
The car price remained the same at $1085 throughout the promotion, and dealerships and distributorships were sold to finance the development and sales effort. Eventually Coats obtained the confidence of Y. F. Stewart who had manufacturing facilities. A pickle factory in Bowling Green, Ohio was obtained and a defunct coachbuilder's factory in Columbus, Ohio was purchased. The Cumberland tire company was shown in advertisements as a third factory, as they were to be the tire supplier.

== Outcomes ==
All was gone by mid 1924 when the Columbus plant was sold. Coats went on to many enthusiastic promotions including road building equipment in 1924 in New Jersey and inadvertently became one of the creators of the syndicate which quickly became CBS. He stayed in radio promotion in New York City and was buried in the family cemetery in Indiana.
