= Robert R. Coats =

American geologist

Robert Roy Coats
- Robert Roy Coats
- Born: November 22, 1910; Toronto, Ontario, Canada
- Died: January 12, 1995 (aged 84); Aptos, California, United States
- Citizenship: American
- Education: University of California at Berkeley, 1938
- Scientific career
- Workplaces: University of Alaska, 1937; U.S. Geological Survey (1939-)

Robert Roy Coats (1910–1995) was an American geologist known for his studies of the Aleutian Islands and his exhaustive report of Elko County, Nevada.

== Selected publications ==
- Coats, Robert R. (1956). Geology of Northern Adak Island, Alaska - Investigation of Alaskan Volcanoes. Vol. 1028-C. Geological Survey Bulletin.
- Coats, Robert R. (1962). "Magma type and crustal structure in the Aleutian arc". In The Crust of the Pacific Basin. American Geophysical Union Monograph. Vol. 6. pp. 92–109.
- Coats, Robert R. (1987). The Geology of Elko County, Nevada. Bull. of the Nevada Bureau of Mines and Geology. Vol. 101. Reno: University of Nevada. p. 112.
