= Cotes, Cumbria =

Hamlet in Cumbria, England

Coordinates: 54.275°N 2.790°W

Cotes
- Cotes

- Location in South Lakeland Location within Cumbria
- OS grid reference: SD485869
- Civil parish: Levens
- Unitary authority: Westmorland and Furness
- Ceremonial county: Cumbria
- Region: North West
- Country: England
- Sovereign state: United Kingdom
- Post town: KENDAL
- Postcode district: LA8
- Dialling code: 015395
- Police: Cumbria
- Fire: Cumbria
- Ambulance: North West
- UK Parliament: Westmorland and Lonsdale

Cotes is a hamlet in Cumbria, England.
