= Cote, West Sussex =

Suburb of Worthing, West Sussex, England

Coordinates: 50°50′32″N 00°25′07″W

Cote
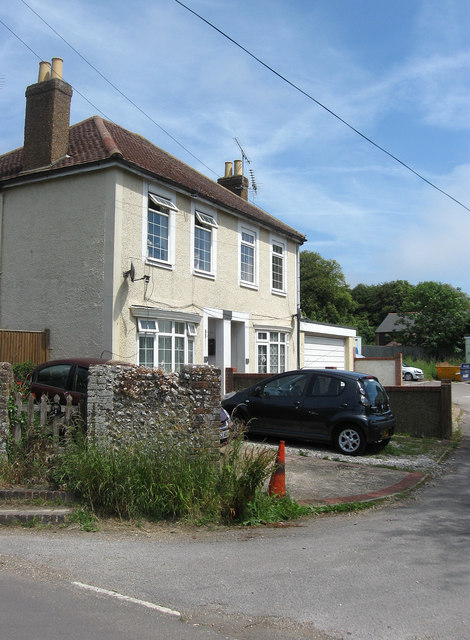
- Cottages at Cote

- Location within West Sussex
- OS grid reference: TQ114059
- District: Worthing
- Shire county: West Sussex
- Region: South East
- Country: England
- Sovereign state: United Kingdom
- Police: Sussex
- Fire: West Sussex
- Ambulance: South East Coast
- UK Parliament: Worthing West

Cote (also Walcote or Coate) was a hamlet in the former parish of Durrington, West Sussex (now a suburb of Worthing), England. It is 3 miles (4.8 km) northwest of Worthing. The old Chichester–Brighton Roman road ran tangentially to the south of the hamlet. "Cote" comes from the Old English word for a dwelling or home (not strictly a cottage), and is widespread in place names in Sussex. There is an area of public amenity land at Cote Bottom, known as the Bird Sanctuary and owned by Worthing Council since 1941.

== Early history ==
It is recorded in c. 1266 as the 2-acre (0.81 ha) home of William de la Cote, son of Thomas de la Walcote, in the then parish of Clopham (now Clapham) and next to the land of Andrew la Holte, son of John la Holte; in a deed when it was bought from him by brothers William and John Clerk, who were to pay an annual rent of 3 pennies at Michaelmas. As of the 20th century, neighbouring Holt Farm still lay across the parish boundary in Clapham parish.

It has been recorded from the 12th century through to 1841, and still had some pre-20th-century houses as of 1978. Originally it, like Durrington, was entirely surrounded by open fields.

Thomas Yeakell's and William Gardner's Map of Sussex shows 6 houses in 1795, and the census recorded 62 inhabitants in 1841. Until sometime in the middle of the 19th century, it was copyhold or freehold of Broadwater Manor. In the early 19th century it was in the hundred of Tarring, combined with Durrington into a 641-acre (259 ha) Durrington and Coate, and alongside Salvington, Heene, and a small 20-acre (8.1 ha) area of downland next to Findon named "No Man's Land". Two of the four large farms in the parish, one of 131 acres (53 ha) and one of 211 acres (85 ha), were in Cote c. 1839, when there was also a parish house for parish meetings.

== Cote Bottom and Munery's Copse ==
=== Geological site ===
The adjacent Cote Bottom is a local geological site in Worthing District. Christopher T. A. Gaster recorded the discovery of Bicavea radiata in his pit number 17 there. (Note: Christopher T. A. Gaster (1878–1963), a Fellow of the Geological Society from Hove, who published several important papers on the Chalk of southern England.) That pit is also the location of a flint seam named Cotes Bottom Flint, described by geologist Rory N. Mortimore as a "double seam of large nodular masses with occasional columnar or paramoudra flint.". The adjacent Munery's Copse is the location of Gaster's pit 18, to the west of pit 17.

In October 1951, Cote Street and Cote Bottom Farm were described as part of Durrington, "on the north side of the main Worthing-Arundel Road, close to Swandean Hospital", when the farm was sold along with 400 turkeys, poultry houses and various farm equipment. In 1954, Worthing Council was looking for a site for a new crematorium, and chose Munery's Copse. However, in 1960 the council was refused planning permission for it.

=== Bird Sanctuary ===
In 1939, Worthing Corporation pledged "that [Cote Bottom] be kept as a public open space for all time and let it be known as the sanctuary, having been paid for" by public subscription. This move also prevented development on the land. In 1941, the land, as part of the South Downs, was transferred to Worthing Corporation and designated as a public amenity, after local people had "done so much" to secure the land "for public walks and pleasure grounds", and as an "open space for the people of Worthing for all time". However, in April 1952 the council had to deal with an angry deputation after it offered half of the land for agricultural use. By May 1952, Cote Bottom was supporting wildlife, which in turn was attracting interest, and reporting on it was Dr A. H. Murch, (Note: Dr A. H. Murch was a Worthing resident, and a member of Sussex Ornithological Society. See: The Sussex Bird Report, 1953) "whose bird life films [were] well known". Among the wildlife reported there on 13 April were nightingale, lapwing and pipistrelle bat. In 1952, Cote Bottom was described in the Worthing Herald as a district of High Salvington, when seventeen acres of land were offered for hay-cutting.

Worthing Council still owns the abovementioned land at Honeysuckle Lane, Cote Bottom, Worthing, known as the Bird Sanctuary. The Bird Sanctuary is now protected as a Site of Nature Conservation Importance (SNCI) and as part of South Downs National Park. It is a "chalk grassland, scrub and semi-natural woodland" area adjacent to High Salvington. Its listing says, "The site represents a scarce habitat in the Borough. Meadow Clary Salvia pratensis, a Red Data Book species, occurs here in one of only two sites in West Sussex ... The combination of grassland and scrub is important for birds and invertebrates".

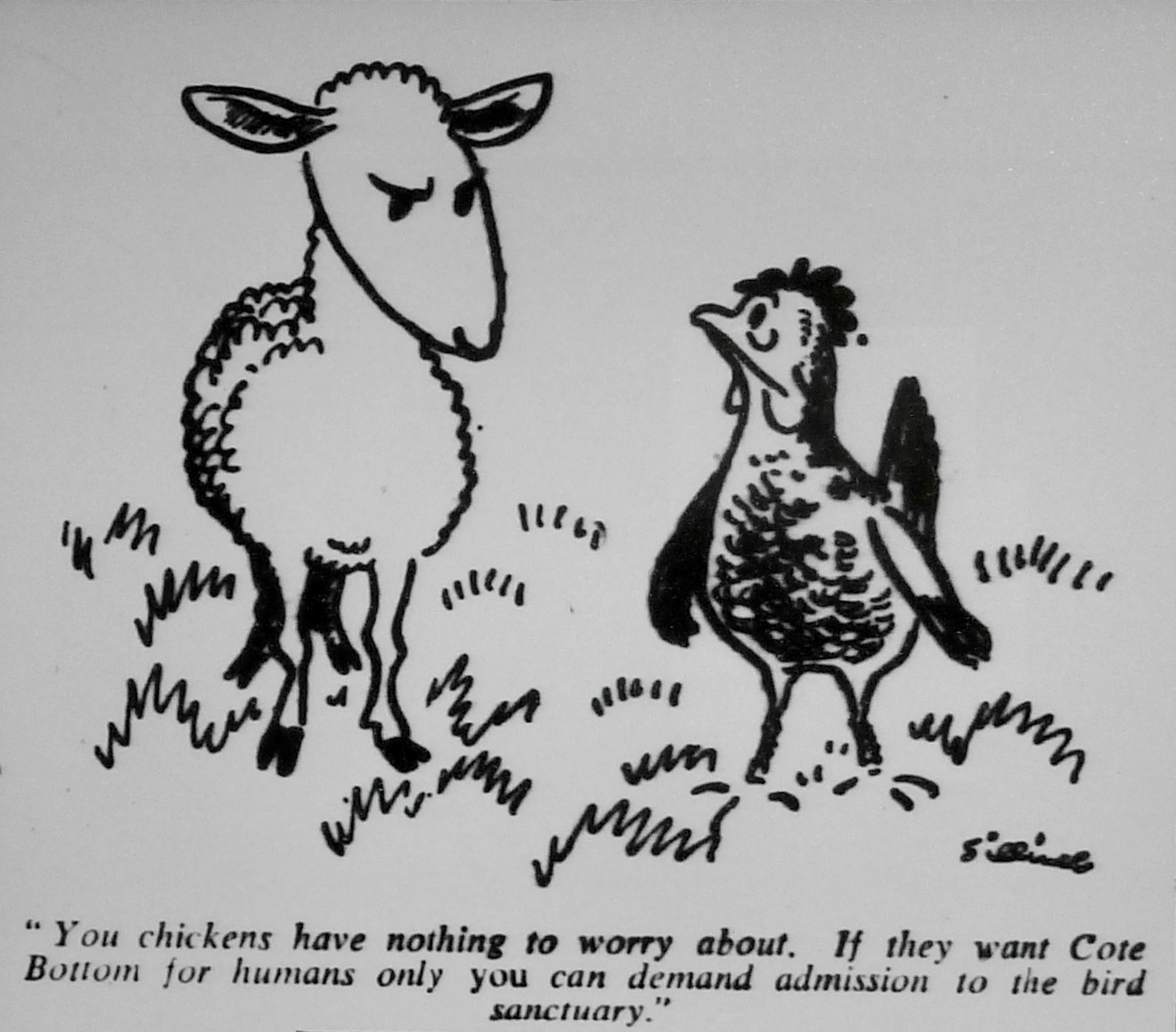
1952 cartoon referencing the dispute (Worthing Herald)

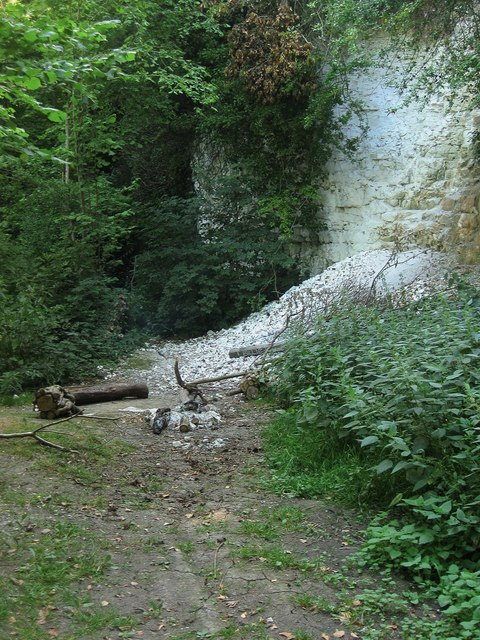
The chalk pit in Cote Bottom

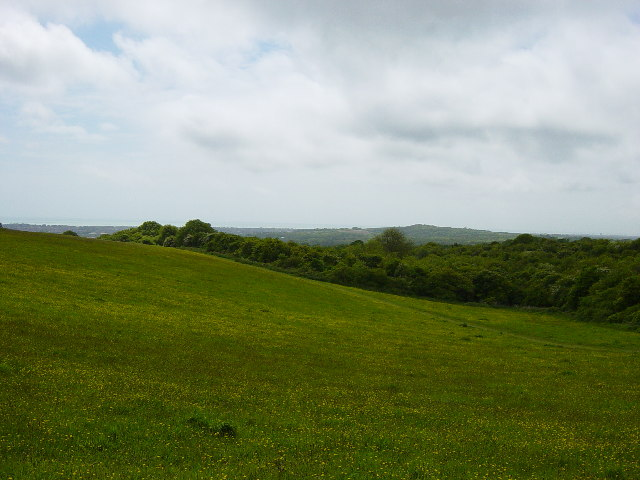
Uncultivated land in the Cote Bottom area

== Upper Cote ==
In 1948, Upper Cote was mentioned in the Worthing Herald newspaper, confirming that the village name existed at that time.
