= List of members of the 6th House of Commons of Northern Ireland =

This is a list of members of Parliament elected in the 1945 Northern Ireland general election.

All members of the Northern Ireland House of Commons elected at the 1945 Northern Ireland general election are listed.

== Members ==
Name	Constituency	Party
Robert Brown Alexander	Belfast Victoria	UUP
J. M. Andrews	Mid Down	UUP
John Edgar Bailey	West Down	UUP
Thomas Bailie	North Down	UUP
John Milne Barbour	South Antrim	UUP
Jack Beattie	Belfast Pottinger	Independent Labour
Basil Brooke	Lisnaskea	UUP
Irene Calvert	Queen's University	Independent
Thomas Joseph Campbell	Belfast Central	Nationalist
Malachy Conlon	South Armagh	Nationalist
Lancelot Curran	Carrick	UUP
Harry Diamond	Belfast Falls	Socialist Republican
Herbert Dixon	Belfast Bloomfield	UUP
Alexander Donnelly	West Tyrone	Nationalist
George Dougan	Central Armagh	UUP
Hugh Downey	Belfast Dock	NI Labour
Erne Ferguson	Enniskillen	UUP
Robert Getgood	Belfast Oldpark	NI Labour
Alexander Gordon	East Down	UUP
William Grant	Belfast Duncairn	UUP
Samuel Hall-Thompson	Belfast Clifton	UUP
Cahir Healy	South Fermanagh	Nationalist
Tommy Henderson	Belfast Shankill	Ind. Unionist
William Lowry	City of Londonderry	UUP
Robert Lynn	North Antrim	UUP
Thomas Lyons	North Tyrone	UUP
Brian Maginess	Iveagh	UUP
Patrick Maxwell	Foyle	Nationalist
Eddie McAteer	Mid Londonderry	Nationalist
William McCoy	South Tyrone	UUP
Michael McGurk	Mid Tyrone	Ind. Nationalist
Dinah McNabb	North Armagh	UUP
Frederick McSorley	Queen's University	Independent
James McSparran	Mourne	Nationalist
Harry Midgley	Belfast Willowfield	Commonwealth Labour
Hugh Minford	Antrim	UUP
Robert Moore	North Londonderry	UUP
Peter Murnoy	South Down	Nationalist
John William Nixon	Belfast Woodvale	Ind. Unionist
Malcolm Patrick	Bannside	UUP
Dehra Parker	South Londonderry	UUP
Robert Perceval-Maxwell	Ards	UUP
Herbert Quin	Queen's University	UUP
John Maynard Sinclair	Belfast Cromac	UUP
Howard Stevenson	Queen's University	UUP
Joe Stewart	East Tyrone	Nationalist
Norman Stronge	Mid Armagh	UUP
Frederick Thompson	Belfast Ballynafeigh	UUP
Walter Topping	Larne	UUP
John Warnock	Belfast St Anne's	UUP
Archibald Wilson	Belfast Windsor	UUP
Robert Nichol Wilson	Mid Antrim	UUP

== Changes ==
- 1945: Jack Beattie joined the Federation of Labour (Ireland).
- 15 October 1945: William McCleery elected for the Unionists in North Antrim, following the death of Robert Lynn.
- 22 August 1946: Francis Hanna elected for the Northern Ireland Labour Party in Belfast Central, following the resignation of Thomas Joseph Campbell.
- 7 November 1946: Terence O'Neill elected for the Unionists in Bannside, following the death of Malcolm Patrick.
- 27 June 1947: James Godfrey MacManaway elected for the Unionists in Londonderry City, following the resignation of William Lowry.
- 20 April 1948: Samuel Irwin elected for the Unionists in Queen's University Belfast, following the death of Frederick McSorley.
- 16 August 1948: Edward McCullagh elected for the Nationalist Party in Mid Tyrone, following the death of Michael McGurk.
- 1949: Jack Beattie disbanded the Federation of Labour (Ireland) and joined the Irish Labour Party.
