= Alexander Blevins =

Alexander Blevins (1901 - 8 February 1975) was a policeman and Ulster Unionist politician.

He sought election in 1958 in the Mid Tyrone constituency and won with 48.7% of the votes cast. This was in part due to a split in the nationalist vote.

In August 1960 he was appointed as a Justice of the Peace for County Tyrone.

In 1962 he stood to defend his seat, but this time he finished second to Tom Gormley, the independent runner-up in 1958, who by 1962 had successfully gained the Nationalist Party nomination.

In 1964 when the Chairman of the Nationalist Party, Joe Stewart died, Blevins contested the by-election in Stewart's former East Tyrone constituency, again as an Ulster Unionist. Blevins was again runner up, this time to Austin Currie.

In 1968 when Ulster Unionist and Mid Ulster MP George Forrest died, Blevins sought UUP nomination to fight the by-election, however lost out to Forrest's widow, Anna.

Blevins, who lived in Tamnaskenny, Cookstown, died suddenly on 8 February 1975.

Parliament of Northern Ireland
| Preceded by Liam Kelly | Member of Parliament for Mid Tyrone; 1958–1962 | Succeeded by Tom Gormley |
