= John Hume =

Irish nationalist politician (1937–2020)

John Hume KCSG
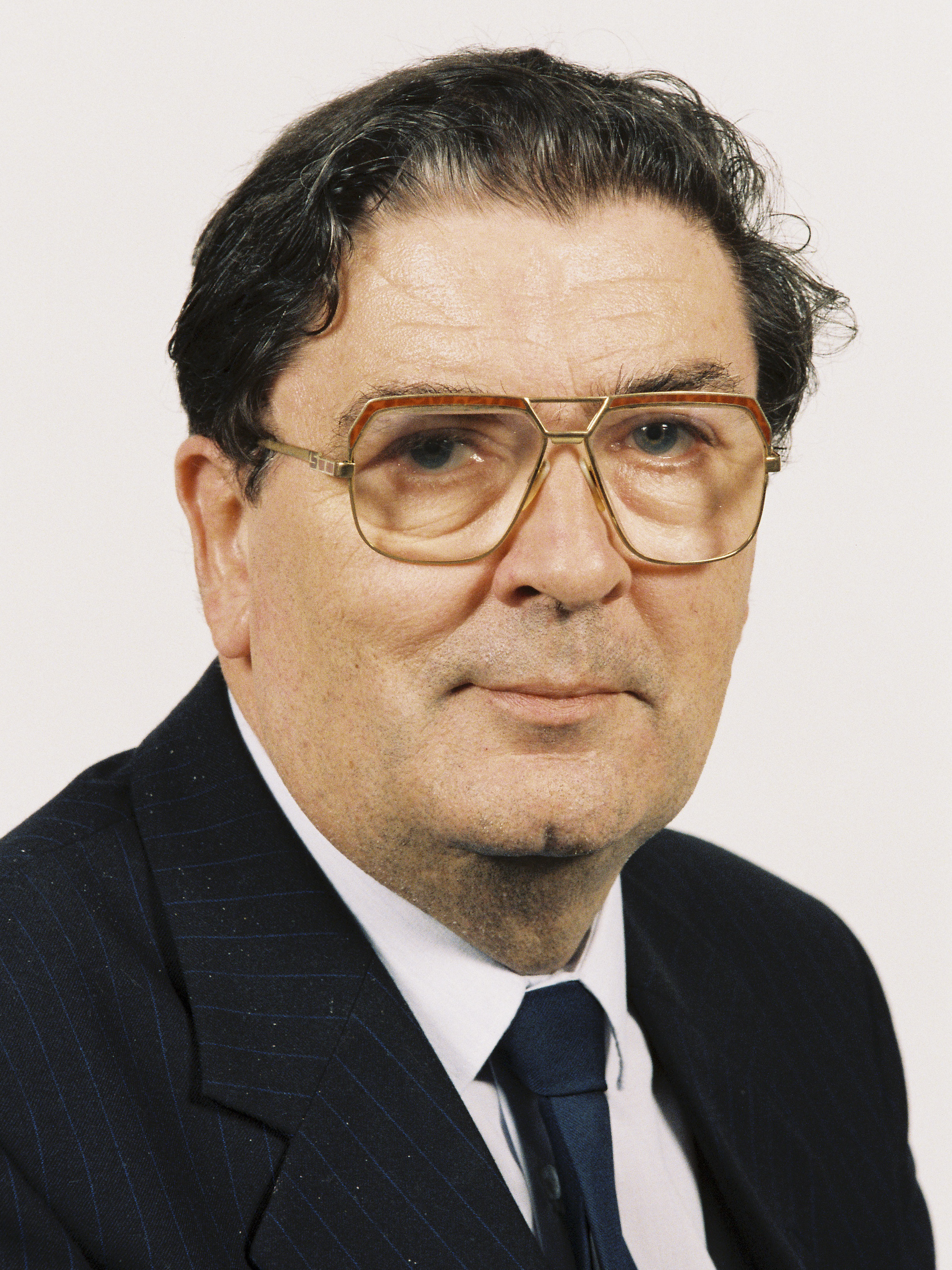
- Hume in 1994

Leader of the Social Democratic and Labour Party
- In office 6 May 1979 – 6 November 2001
- Deputy: Seamus Mallon
- Preceded by: Gerry Fitt
- Succeeded by: Mark Durkan

Deputy Leader of the Social Democratic and Labour Party
- In office 1970 – 6 May 1979
- Leader: Gerry Fitt
- Preceded by: Office created
- Succeeded by: Seamus Mallon

Member of the Legislative Assembly for Foyle
- In office 25 June 1998 – 1 December 2000
- Preceded by: Constituency established
- Succeeded by: Annie Courtney

Member of Parliament for Foyle
- In office 9 June 1983 – 11 April 2005
- Preceded by: Constituency established
- Succeeded by: Mark Durkan

Member of the European Parliament for Northern Ireland
- In office 10 June 1979 – 13 June 2004
- Preceded by: Constituency established
- Succeeded by: Bairbre de Brún

Member of the Parliament of Northern Ireland for Foyle
- In office 24 February 1969 – 30 March 1972
- Preceded by: Eddie McAteer
- Succeeded by: Parliament abolished

Personal details
- Born: 18 January 1937 Derry, Northern Ireland
- Died: 3 August 2020 (aged 83) Derry, Northern Ireland
- Party: Social Democratic and Labour Party
- Spouse: Pat Hone (m. 1960)
- Children: 5
- Education: St Patrick's College, Maynooth
- Profession: Politician

John Hume (18 January 1937 – 3 August 2020) was an Irish nationalist politician in Northern Ireland and a Nobel Peace Prize laureate. A founder and leader of the Social Democratic and Labour Party, Hume served in the Parliament of Northern Ireland; the Northern Ireland Assembly including, in 1974, its first power-sharing executive; the European Parliament and the United Kingdom Parliament. Seeking an accommodation between Irish nationalism and Ulster unionism, and soliciting American support, he was both critical of British government policy in Northern Ireland and opposed to the republican embrace of "armed struggle". In their 1998 citation, the Norwegian Nobel Committee recognised Hume as an architect of the Good Friday Agreement. For his own part, Hume wished to be remembered as having been, in his earlier years, a pioneer of the credit union movement.

== Early life and education ==
Hume was born in 1937 into a working-class Catholic family in Derry, the eldest of seven children of Anne "Annie" (née Doherty), a seamstress, and Samuel Hume, a former soldier and shipyard worker. He had a mostly Irish Catholic background, though his surname derived from one of his great-grandfathers, a Scottish Presbyterian who migrated to County Donegal.

Hume was among the first to benefit from the 1947 Education Act. which in Northern Ireland "revolutionised access to secondary and further education". It provided him with scholarships, first to attend St Columb's College, a fee-paying grammar school, and then St Patrick's College, Maynooth. This was the leading Catholic seminary in Ireland and a recognised college of the National University of Ireland. Among his teachers was Tomás Ó Fiaich.

Ó Fiaich's colleague, Monsignor Brendan Devlin recalls that the future cardinal and Primate of All Ireland turned his student (with whom he spoke in Irish) towards the local history of Ulster. Devlin believes that, being a Derry man Hume "didn't need much pushing".

You begin to ask questions ... how did this come around. I grew up in a city surrounded by battlements. Everything inside the battlement was Protestant and everything in the slums was Catholic. Is this normal in the city? Is this a normal city? And if you have any brains at all you begin to find out it is not. You know, it's not normal and the government of the city is gerrymandered. My crowd is getting no show at all. There must be a reason for this. And, of course, John got into all that.

Hume did not complete his clerical studies but graduated in 1958 with a degree in French and history. In 1958, he returned home to his native Derry, where he became a teacher at his Alma mater, St Columb's College, later, in 1964, earning an MA from Maynooth with a thesis exploring the conditions that drove Derry's principal export in the 19th century, emigrants.

== First civic and political engagement ==
=== Credit-union movement ===
In 1960, aged 23, Hume helped establish the Derry Credit Union, the first cooperative community bank in Northern Ireland. Pooling their resources, working people were able to create a low-interest alternative to moneylenders and pawn shops. Such was the success of this exercise in what he represented as "practical Christianity" (and as "Catholic in origin"), that within four years Hume had become the youngest ever President of the Irish League of Credit Unions, a role in which he served until 1968. He was later to remark that of all the things he contributed to in his life, he was proudest of his engagement with credit unions, no movement having done "more good for the people of Ireland, north and south".

=== The "Third Force" ===
In 1963, drawing on his Maynooth thesis research, Hume wrote a script for a television documentary on Derry, A City Solitary, that was broadcast on both the BBC and RTÉ. It persuaded The Irish Times to open its pages to the "first considered statement" of Hume's political views

Under the title "The Northern Catholic" (18 and 19 May 1964), Hume wrote of an emerging "third force": a "generation of younger Catholics in the North" frustrated with the nationalist policy of non-recognition and abstention. Determined to engage the great social problems of housing, unemployment and emigration, they were willing to accept "the Protestant tradition in the North as legitimate" and that Irish unity should be achieved only "by the will of the Northern majority."

"Normal politics" would not emerge in Northern Ireland from Catholic engagement alone. Much would depend on the responsiveness of the northern government whose "skilful placing" of investment was contributing to exceptionally high Catholic unemployment and emigration. If the governing unionists failed to respond to "repeated statements of Catholic willingness to get together", he warned that there would be a hardening of opinion and further polarisation.

Hume first test of the possibilities for change was as chair in 1965 of the University for Derry Committee. Accompanied by the city's Unionist mayor, Albert Anderson, and its Stormont MP, the leader of the Nationalist party, Eddie McAteer, Hume led a 25,000-strong protest on the steps of Stormont, convinced that the case for developing Derry's Magee College as Northern Ireland's second university was "unanswerable". When the city lost out to Coleraine, and when later the same year Derry again lost to Lurgan and Portadown for a new urban-industrial development, Hume sensed a wider conspiracy. Addressing a meeting in London of the Labour Party ginger group, Campaign for Democracy in Ulster, he suggested that "the plan" was "to cause a migration from West to East Ulster, redistributing and scattering the minority to that the Unionist Party will not only maintain but strengthen its position".

Involved in voluntary housing movement in his home city, Hume argued that (notwithstanding "excellent assistance" from the Ministry of Development), he battled the same sectarian-political logic within Derry itself. A unionist minority secured majority control of the city council through gerrymandering which involved restricting planning permission for potential Catholic homes.

=== Duke Street march, October 1968 ===
On 5 October 1968, the Derry Labour Party and Derry Housing Action Committee proceeded with a march in the city, originally sponsored by the Northern Ireland Civil Rights Association (NICRA), in defiance of a last-minute order by the government alarmed at the prospect of a clash with parading Apprentice Boys. Hume, had had no part in the organisation. He had refused an invitation to set up a NICRA branch in his home city. He was wary of the association's infiltration by left-wing activists such as Derry socialist Eamon McCann. McCann later conceded that "conscious, if unspoken strategy", of the march organisers, "was to provoke the police into overreaction and thus spark off mass reaction against the authorities".Hume appeared on the day but, in the recollection of McCann, walked on the pavement alongside the march, "half there and half not".

A later official inquiry found that all that had been required for police to begin "using their batons indiscriminately" against the 400 protesters (among them Belfast Republican Labour MP Gerry Fitt, hit twice on the head and hospitalised) was defiance of the initial order to disperse. The Duke Street march sparked two days of street fighting as protesters and residents resisted the entry of the Royal Ulster Constabulary (RUC) into the Catholic Bogside. Hume, elected vice-chair of a new Citizens’ Action Committee (CAC), called for a sit-down protest at the Guildhall two weeks later. A further peaceful demonstration organised and stewarded by CAC on 16 November attracted 15,000. With the government appearing to respond, both Hume's committee and NICRA called for a suspension of further protests.

== Stormont MP ==
=== Enters electoral politics ===
In response to the events in Derry, the Unionist government announced that the city's corporation would be replaced by an independent development commission. It also committed to a needs-based points system for public housing, an ombudsman to investigate citizen grievances, the abolition of the rates-based franchise in council elections, and a review of the broad security provisions of the Special Powers Act. When these reforms were placed in jeopardy by the internal unionist dissension, and a snap election was called by Prime Minister Terence O'Neill, Hume decided to enter electoral politics.

In the February 1969 poll, he secured 55 percent of the vote in his home Foyle constituency against 33 percent for the standing MP and long-time leader of the Nationalist Party, Eddie McAteer, and 12 percent for McCann of the Northern Ireland Labour Party. Notwithstanding their contest, six months later, on 12 August 1969, Hume linked arms with McAteer in an attempt to hold back his constituents in a further confrontation with the police, recalled as the Battle of the Bogside.

In the election Hume had presented himself as an independent, but his immediate objective was the formation of a broad-based party that could advance the wider reform he believed necessary.

=== Joins in the formation of the SDLP ===
In August 1970, Hume became deputy leader of the Social Democratic and Labour Party (SDLP) which he formed with five other Stormont MPs: Gerry Fitt, Republican Labour Party; Austin Currie, Nationalist Party; Paddy Devlin, Northern Ireland Labour Party; and independents, NICRA activists Ivan Cooper and Paddy O’Hanlon. Serving as the party's General Secretary (until his assassination by loyalists in June 1973) was Republican-Labour Senator, Paddy Wilson.

According to Devlin, this coalition had not been Hume's first choice. In June 1970, Hume had broken with others in the group in supporting Eddie McAteer, as the Westminster challenger to the Unionist for Londonderry. The others were of the view that the civil-rights campaigner Claude Wilton was the more credible candidate. They believed a Protestant, who, as an Ulster Liberal, had taken more than a third of the vote in the constituency the year before, had "just the sort of cross-community support" they were aiming to attract "as the bedrock" of their new party. Hume had been meeting with McAteer's Nationalists and with Gerry Quigley's National Democratic Party, and was pulled back to the Stormont group only when they announced that they were going ahead with a new party under the leadership of Fitt. Hume proposed that it be called the "Social Democratic Party", but Fitt and Devlin had insisted that without "Labour" in its title, the party would not be acceptable to their working-class voters in Belfast.

Not embraced in the new party was Bernadette Devlin. Devlin had made international headlines, aged 21, as the youngest MP to enter the British House of Commons following her victory in April 1969 as the "Unity" candidate in a Mid Ulster by-election, and again in December when given a six months' sentence for her role in the defence of the Bogside. Viewing her as having gone "wholly over to the International Socialists in Britain", Hume described her as a "disaster".

Neither did the new party extend to those, previously pro-O'Neill unionists, nationalists and rights activists, who in April 1970 formed the Alliance Party. They had courted Hume, but he refused the invitation to join their cross-community grouping. With his colleagues, Hume insisted that, like Alliance, they would prioritise the socio-economic above the constitutional question. While they were committed to "eventual" Irish unification—to a new all-Ireland constitution that would provide "the framework for the emergence of a just, egalitarian and secular society"—this would be on the basis of "the consent of the majority of the people in the North and in the South". As a further token of their cross-community bona fides, Hume cited the fact that Cooper, among other founding members, was Protestant, evidence, he suggested, that "the important issue" for the party was "human rights not religion".

In June 1971, while he appeared to join his colleagues in responding positively to the offer of Prime Minister Brian Faulkner to more fully engage them in parliament through committees, Hume suggested to party activists that it was time to consider scrapping the Government of Ireland Act 1920. With Fitt, Devlin was wary of what he called "the old nationalist knee-jerk of abstention", and of appearing to give the "gunmen" a mandate. But when in July the Unionist government refused to authorise a public inquiry into the fatal shooting by the British Army of two men in Derry, Hume carried the day and led the SDLP out of Stormont, declaring it un-reformable.

=== Response to the onset of the Provisional campaign and to internment ===
Responding to the developing campaign of the Provisional Irish Republican Army (PIRA), Hume proposed that armed republicans could best serve the cause of Irish unity by disbanding: "violence and the threat of it only strengthens unionism, it only deepens and heightens sectarian divisions which represent the real border in our country". Taking issue with the essential premise of PIRA's "drive-out-the-Brits" strategy, he argued:

[T]he struggle against partition is not, as the struggle for independence was, a struggle against a foreign and occupying power. It is a struggle to bring together two sections of the Irish people, and how can anyone imagine ... that violence by one section against the other can unite them. Reform and reconciliation are the only way ....

In relation to those "who have no respect for human life and seem to think that human lives are expendable as a means of achieving political ends," there should be no "fence-sitting."

At the same time, Hume expressed outrage at the government's resort in August 1971 to a policy of internment that saw large numbers of Catholics detained and sometimes brutally interrogated. On 22 January 1972, he led protesters toward the perimeter of the Magilligan internment camp along Benone beach (reassured those who might wish to throw stones would have only sand underfoot). They were driven back with baton charges and canisters of CS gas. Fearing the consequences ("if they stopped a march on the beach, what were they going to do in the city"), a week later Hume sat out a NICRA organised march in Derry. On Sunday 30 January 1972, the Parachute Regiment shot 26 unarmed civilians, killing 14. Faced with a choice between "repression or change of system", it was evident to Hume that the British were choosing repression. He compared the killings to the 1960 Sharpeville massacre in South Africa. Yet in the wake of Bloody Sunday, he continued to insist on a non-violent response. In August 1972, his party initiated a campaign of civil disobedience that by October had 16,000 households withholding council house rent and rates.

== Power-sharing minister ==
=== Signatory to Sunningdale ===
In March 1972, the London government prorogued the Northern Ireland Parliament and imposed direct rule "not merely to restore order but to reshape the Province's system of government". In the interim, Hume, together with Paddy Devlin, had his first experience of mediating between the Provisional IRA and the British government: 18 days of cease-fire assisted contacts that PIRA decisively broke off with Bloody Friday. On 21 July, the Provisional IRA set off 21 bombs across Belfast killing 9 and injuring 130.

In October 1972, the government brought out a Green Paper, The Future of Northern Ireland, which seemed to embrace much of Hume's analysis. While Northern Ireland would remain part of the United Kingdom for as long as that is the wish of a majority of the people, the government would take into account the "Irish Dimension" of the unfolding crisis. It would seek to accommodate the legitimate interests both of the minority in Northern Ireland that saw themselves as "simply part of the wider Irish community", and of the Republic of Ireland to whom it committed to make any new arrangements "as far as possible acceptable".

On this basis, and following an election in June 1973 of a new Northern Ireland Assembly in which the SDLP emerged as the sole representatives of the nationalist community, Hume and his colleagues reached an agreement to enter into "power-sharing" executive with Unionists under their former Prime Minister Brian Faulkner as chief executive. SDLP leader Gerry Fitt was to be Faulkner's deputy, and Hume Minister of Commerce. The parties signed their coalition agreement at Sunningdale in England on 9 December and took up office on 1 January 1974.

Hume had acted in direct defiance of PIRA intimidation. At the time of the agreement they had botched an attempt to kidnap his daughter Aine. In a case of mistaken identity, a schoolmate was bundled into a car and driven across the border.

=== Presses for Council of Ireland ===
From the outset of the negotiations, Hume had been under pressure to demonstrate that there was a prospective path to ending partition. There was a need to respond to the general "unificationist feeling" among nationalists that had followed the closure of Stormont, and at the same time to fend off the challenge from PIRA who were continuing to draw on public outrage over Bloody Sunday and the slow winding down of internment.

Hume highlighted the agreement's return to an original feature of the Government of Ireland Act 1920, the Council of Ireland. He described the cross border ministerial and parliamentary forum as "a continuing conference table" at which "Catholic, Protestant, Planter and Gael" could explore the bases for unity. But more than a talking shop, it was to have real executive, harmonising and supervisory powers. Convinced that policing in nationalist areas now required supra-national legitimation, Hume proposed, for example, that the Council have control of the Police Authority for Northern Ireland.

Hume's party colleague, Social Services minister, Paddy Devlin regretted the SDLP had not "adopted a two stage approach, by allowing power sharing at Stormont to establish itself". He recalls all other considerations being overridden by the drive to get Council established in the hope of producing "the dynamic that would lead ultimately to an agreed united Ireland".

Already in February, a surprise Westminster election had left Faulkner's pro-Assembly grouping with just 13% of the unionist vote. Arguing that they had deprived Faulkner of any semblance of a mandate, the victorious United Ulster Unionist Coalition called for new Assembly elections. When these were refused, a loyalist coalition, the Ulster Workers' Council (UWC), called a general strike. Within two weeks the UWC, supported by the loyalist paramilitaries, had an effective stranglehold on energy supplies. Arguing with what Faulkner regarded as "exasperating dogmatism", Hume would neither delay the council, nor accept the condition now sought for its introduction by pro-executive unionists: the repeal of Articles 2 and 3 of the Irish Constitution claiming Northern Ireland as the Republic's national territory. Instead, Hume pressed for a British Army enforced fuel-oil plan and for resistance to "a fascist takeover".

=== Conclusions from the executive collapse ===
On 28 May, finding the new Northern Ireland Secretary, Mervyn Rees, willing neither to reopen political negotiations nor to confront the strikers, Faulkner resigned. Conceding that there was no longer any constitutional basis for the Executive, Rees dissolved the Assembly. Hume continued to insist that the executive might have survived had Rees taken a tougher stand, conceding only that the Secretary might have had greater difficulty in collapsing the institutions had the original agreement been legitimised by a popular referendum. His Ulster Unionist colleague on the executive, Basil McIvor, argued rather that it was Hume who had blown "out the light at the end of the tunnel", that for the survival power sharing Hume's "grim and unbending" insistence on the council had been "disaster".

The future Ulster Unionist leader, Reg Empey, who as a member Bill Craig's Vanguard movement had opposed Sunningdale, believed that the experience of 1974 "seared" Hume, and convinced him that any future arrangement would have to be internationalised.

=== Caution on integrated education ===
During his brief career in government, there was an issue on which Hume was reportedly at odds, not only with his Unionist colleagues, but also with those in own party, including Devlin. As Minister of Education, McIvor had proposed a third type of school. In addition to the existing (Catholic) Maintained Schools and the (non-Catholic) Controlled Schools, there should be "shared schools", "available to Catholic and Protestant parents alike who wished to have their children educated together". Disregarding a message from Cardinal William Conway "not to interfere with the schools", McIvor brought the proposal to the Executive where he recalls it being welcomed by all, save Hume. Hume was "less than enthusiastic".

In 1989, the year in which Westminster created a statutory framework for what was now called integrated education, Sinn Féin made its position clear. The "main purpose" of the new schools sector was "propagandistic". It was to "promote the British government's presentation internationally of the problem in the six counties as a religious one and deliberately to mislead people about the real sources of the problem". While this appeared to go to the heart of the Provisionals' disagreement with Hume, and while integrationists broadly shared Hume's view of sectarian division as "the real border", Hume remained ambivalent. He allowed that "insofar as it shows a determination to avoid sectarian conditioning", integrated schools were to be "welcomed". But under his leadership the SDLP did not commit to promote the new schools (and was to "surprise" Catholic clerics when it eventually did so in 2016).

== Nationalist leader ==
=== Party leader ===
In defending the Sunningdale agreement, Hume suggested that it had been "purely on the basis of [their] agreed economic and social policies that members of the executive had come together", and that to consider the case for state intervention, worker democracy and a radical approach to poverty they would do so again. Paddy Devlin was not convinced: arguing that the SDLP “was being stripped of its socialism and being taken over by unadulterated nationalists”, he resigned from the party in 1977. When, in May 1979, Fitt likewise suggested that the SDLP, in prioritising the "Irish Dimension" over the trust required for power sharing, had gone "too green", that it had become simply a "Catholic nationalist party", Hume replaced him as party leader.

The changeover failed to quell dissension within the party: some members complained of Hume's style as autocratic and self promoting. While he admired Hume as an "original thinker", Austin Currie recalls that he was "extremely good at picking up points made by others and presenting them as his own". In his personal memoirs, Hume passes over Currie and other of his one-time fellow SDLP MPs with single references, including Seamus Mallon who served 22 years beside him in the party as deputy leader.

As party leader, biographers suggest that his metier was the mass media. In the "intimacy of the television studio", his skills as a lobbyist and as a committee man "came into their own". While Mallon observed that his party leader "didn't take criticism well – in fact he wouldn't take it at all", Hume offered it as his "golden rule" in broadcast interviews never to get angry, anger being the surest indication that you had lost the argument.

=== Member of the European Parliament ===
In June 1979, Hume was elected (with 24.6% of first preference votes) as one of Northern Ireland's three Members of the European Parliament. He was to hold his seat in Strasbourg for five terms, until his retirement in 2004. He joined the Socialist Group in the Parliament, and for almost all his time as an MEP was a member of the group's bureau.

In Europe, Hume found sufficient evidence that a "divided society [need not] be a violent one". He cited the accommodations between French and Flemish speakers in Belgium; between Madrid and Catalonia in Spain; and between Catholics, Protestants and Socialists in the Netherlands, arguing:

The one thing all these successful attempts at conflict resolution have in common is that these divided communities recognised the legitimacy of the position of their counterparts and set up structures that, by guaranteeing equality for all citizens, permitted the existence of a common citizenship. The essential element of their success has been to replace the concept of division with that of diversity.

He saw the then European Community as, itself, an example of reconciliation through the construction of shared political and social institutions. Championing as an MEP protections for minority languages, Hume emphasised the "diversity" that could be accommodated.

=== Lobbyist in the United States ===
Hume also saw the European project as an opportunity for representatives of the rival domestic traditions to cooperate in a context free of local prejudices and history. In lobbying for special economic development assistance for Northern Ireland, he gave practical demonstration of this by working closely with his two unionist MEP colleagues. This included the man regarded at home as his nemesis, the leader of the Democratic Unionist Party, Ian Paisley. In September 1983, Hume went on a nine-day investment promotion tour of North America in the company of Paisley to whom, six months before, the U.S. State Department had denied a visa citing a "record of inflammatory actions and statements ... contrary to the interest of the United States in the achievement of a peaceful settlement in Northern Ireland".

In the United States, Hume had developed close relations with U.S. House Speaker Tip O'Neill, U.S. Senators Ted Kennedy and Daniel Moynihan, and New York Governor Hugh Carey (the "Four Horsemen"). With their support, in 1977, President Jimmy Carter issued a statement promising U.S. assistance in the event of Northern Ireland reaching a new cross-party agreement. They were also supported Hume in his efforts to dissuade Irish Americans from funding the Provisional republican movement. He cautioned those contributing to NORAID that they were supporting a "vicious parody" of Irish republicanism that, as first set forth by the United Irishmen, properly rests on the "brotherhood" of Catholic and Protestant.

=== Stands SDLP aside in Hunger Strike elections ===
When in March 1981, Sinn Féin put forward PIRA hunger-striker Bobby Sands as the Anti H-Block candidate for a Fermanagh and South Tyrone by-election, Hume prevented his party colleague, Austin Currie, from entering the contest. In what he regarded as "a no-win situation", Hume also deferred to Sinn Féin's nominated successor for the seat, Owen Carron, when a month after his election Sands died. "Sometimes", Hume later commented, "in politics you are faced with two wrong choices". Papers reveal that Irish ministers and officials regarded this at the time as a mistake and as "a major triumph for the IRA". Together with the continued swelling of support in Ireland and internationally as nine further hunger strikers died, by standing aside the SDLP is seen as having accommodated the first steps of the Provisional republican movement on the political path that would ultimately see Sinn Féin in 2007 supplant the party as the principal representative of nationalism.

In the Westminster general election of June 1983, Hume saw off a challenge from Derry's sometime PIRA commander Sinn Féin's Martin McGuinness in the newly created Westminster constituency of Foyle. But the same election saw Gerry Fitt, now an Independent, lose Belfast West to the new Sinn Féin president Gerry Adams.

=== First Adams talks ===
In January 1988, Hume and Adams were brought together at the Clonard Monastery in west Belfast by the Redemptorist priest Alec Reid. Through Reid, they exchanged documents outlining each party's position on ways to end the conflict. Hume again tackled Adams on the central premises of the PIRA campaign. It was not enough, he argued, to suggest that the British presence was the cause of all the violence in the North. The question was whether the provisional republican movement would take responsibility for the suffering and loss caused by the choices it had made in responding to that presence, and whether it would accept that the "armed struggle" had not advanced the agreement needed for the divided country to exercise its right to sovereignty.

When Adams and Sinn Féin leadership refused to accept the need for an end to the PIRA campaign, when it was clear that their strategy would remain that of "the ballot box and the armalite", Hume publicly restated his moral and political rejection of their methods.

Their decision ... to use guns and bombs to "persuade" their Protestant fellow Irishmen is not only an example of an extreme lack of faith in their own beliefs or in the credibility of them, it is an attitude of extreme moral cowardice and a deeply partitionist attitude. For its real effect is to deepen the essential divisions among the Irish people.

He proposed that if he were "to lead a civil rights campaign in Northern Ireland today", it would be against the IRA.

It is they [the IRA] who carry out the greatest infringements of human and civil rights, whether it is their murders, their executions without trial, their kneecappings and punishment shootings, their bombing of jobs and people. The most fundamental right is the right to life. Who in Northern Ireland takes most human lives in a situation where there is not one single injustice that justifies the taking of human life?

The statistics, he observed, were "devastating": "people describing themselves as Irish republicans" had killed "six times as many human beings as the British army, thirty times as many as the RUC, and 250 times as many as the UDR" and, as for being "defenders" of their community, they had killed twice as many Catholics as the security forces and in the previous ten years more than the loyalists.

== Road to Good Friday ==
=== The Anglo-Irish Agreement ===
In the New Ireland Forum, an SDLP conference with the southern parties Fianna Fáil, Fine Gael, and Labour, Hume affirmed the principle that a new Ireland could be achieved only with unionist agreement and support: "we seek a solution, not a victory". (Later, in response to Sinn Féin, he was to caution against underestimating the challenge involved: Ulster Protestants had their own "deep-seated and deeply felt reasons" to "wish to live apart from the rest of the people of Ireland").

Yet a month later, in June 1983, Hume in his maiden speech in the British House of Commons, and in subsequent debates, called on the government to reconsider its consistent policy--"that there will be no change in the constitutional position of the Northern Ireland without the majority's consent". This might seem democratic but, given the "majority that is being guaranteed was created artificially by a sectarian headcount", he argued that it sustained a "solidified sectarianism".

In November 1985, the government appeared to relent. Disregarding universal unionist opposition, Prime Minister Margaret Thatcher signed an agreement with the Irish Taoiseach, Garret FitzGerald that for the first time gave the Republic a direct role in the government of Northern Ireland. An Anglo-Irish Intergovernmental Conference, with a locally based secretariat, would invite the Irish government to "put forward views on proposals" for major legislation concerning Northern Ireland. Proposals, however, would only be on matters that are "not the responsibility of a devolved administration in Northern Ireland". The implication for unionists was that if they wished to limit Dublin's influence, they would have to climb down from insistence on majority rule and think again as to how nationalists might be accommodated.

Party colleague Seamus Mallon credited Hume for the perceived breakthrough. His leader had spent so much time and effort cultivating ties in Washington, New York and Boston because, with Britain reluctant to challenge the unionist veto, "the only place from where that pressure could come was from the US". He recalled that Thatcher (who in the Brighton bombing the year before had only narrowly escaped IRA assassination) had said after the implementation of the Anglo-Irish agreement that "it was the American who made me do it. But her government's calculation may also been driven by the fear of Sinn Féin replacing the SDLP as the voice of northern nationalism.

However, in the wake of the Agreement, Mallon appears to have accorded the border question greater urgency than Hume. At a meeting in London (where Mallon for the first time was taking his Westminster seat for Newry and Armagh), Hume, according to their host, Irish Ambassador Noel Dorr, proposed that "the concept of [Irish] unity is more important as a factor in what he called 'the tribal conflict' than in itself". His people in Derry had closer links with Glasgow than the west of Ireland or even Dublin, and knew that "the time is not right" for unity. For Mallon, who "spoke of the desire for Irish unity as a deep motivating force North and South of the border", the Agreement was "a kind of last throw by constitutional Irish nationalism". For his leader it was "a new beginning rather than a last opportunity" and, should it fail, "another agreement" securing Dublin's advisory role would follow.

=== Bringing in the Provisional movement ===
In March 1991, the Ulster Unionists and Paisley's Democratic Unionists conceded Hume's conditions for political talks on the future of Northern Ireland. In their submission to the inter-party talks in 1992, the Ulster Unionists (then still the largest party) said they could envisage a range of cross-border bodies so long as these were under the control of the Northern Assembly, did not involve an overarching all-Ireland Council, and were not designed to be developed in the direction of joint authority.

In the course of the talks, Hume acknowledged the provisional republican movement as "the one organisation that could make the greatest contribution" to an agreed future (he also revealed to John Chilcott of the Northern Ireland Office, that he knew PIRA already had a back channel to the government through another St.Columb's old boy, Brendan Duddy). He secretly renewed contact with Adams. Again he challenged Adams and his comrades on their justifications for violence. Their "whataboutery" was unconvincing. British outrages should not be seen as providing the standards for republican behaviour.

Over British objections, in January 1994 President Clinton allowed Adams to make the journey Hume had been taking since the 1970s. Although it was on a 48-hour visa limited to New York City, Adams has described his visit to the United States as "pivotal" to the subsequent peace process. Together with the Alliance Party's John Alderdice, Hume joined Adams at an event hosted by the National Committee on American Foreign Policy at the Waldorf Astoria. Two months later the IRA declared a three-day "cessation of hostilities" and then, believing that "an opportunity to secure a just and lasting settlement has been created", in August declared its first ceasefire since 1975.

Adams acknowledged Hume's assistance "in the background" and, after their contact was exposed (in April 1993, Adams had been spotted going into Hume's house in Derry), the extent to which Hume was "pilloried, vilified and condemned" by the British government, by most political parties and by large sections of the media. Adams, himself, greatly intensified pressure. In October 1993, PIRA Volunteer Thomas Begley was killed carrying a bomb into a shop on Belfast's Shankill Road that took the lives of nine other people and injured sixty. Pat Hume recalls that when, days later, her husband watched television footage of Adams carrying the coffin at Begley's funeral he started to cry: “He was not able to sleep. He was not eating properly. There were all sorts of vicious letters arriving in the post, vicious phone calls coming".

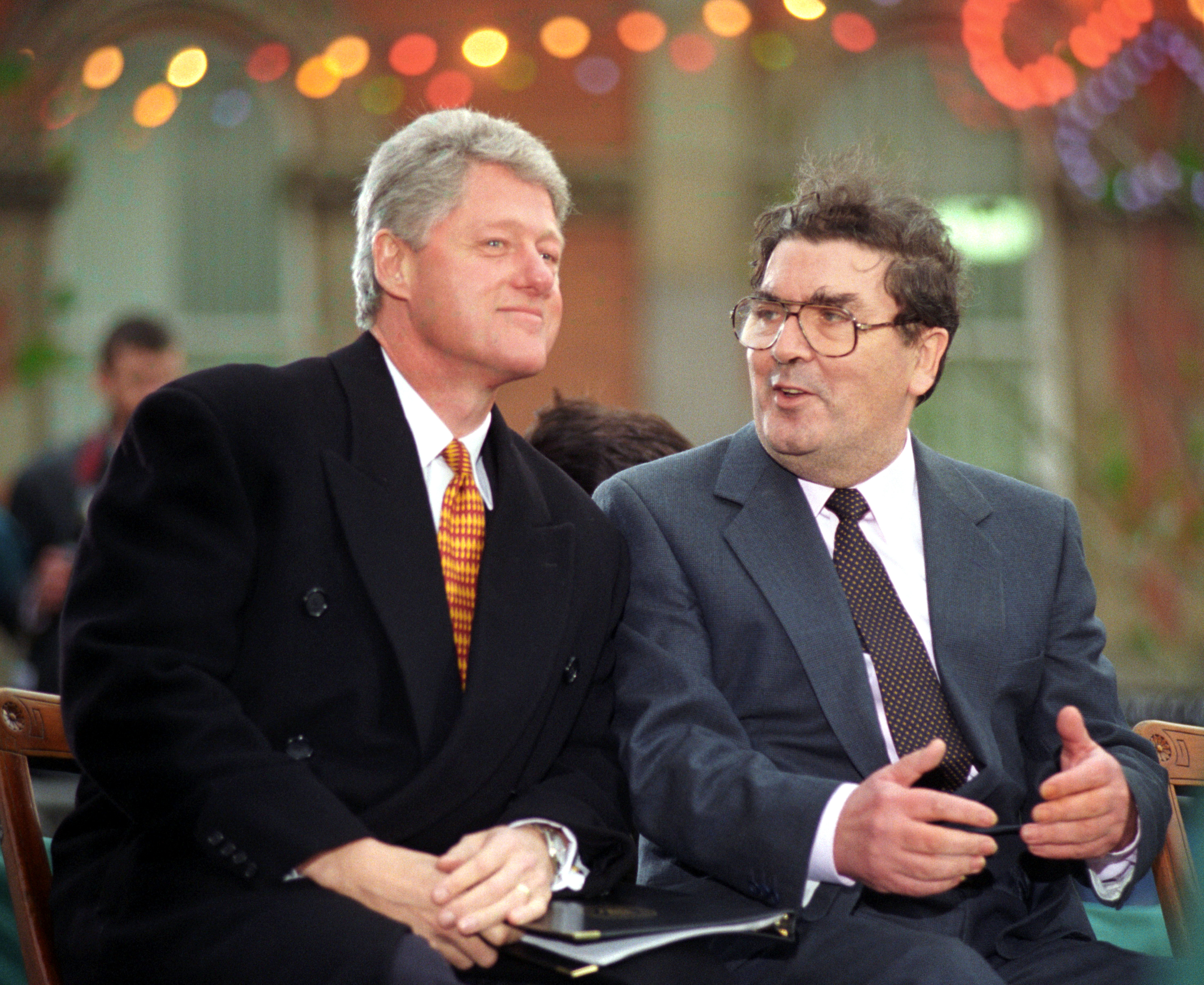
Hume with US president Bill Clinton in 1995

=== Reaching a settlement ===
At the time of the August 1994 ceasefire, Hume and Adams issued a joint declaration. It affirmed that a lasting settlement had to be based "on the right of the Irish people as a whole to national self-determination", but conceded Hume's consistent position.

The exercise of this right [to self-determination] is, of course, a matter for agreement between all the people of Ireland and we reiterate that such a new agreement is only viable if it enjoys the allegiance of the different traditions on this island by accommodating diversity and providing for national reconciliation.

PIRA twice disrupted what was now referred to as the "peace process" by ending their ceasefire, which in turn reinforced the Unionists in their demand that PIRA disarm as a condition of Sinn Féin's admission to inter-party talks. Hume helped get around this by proposing an international body on arms decommissioning to be headed by President Clinton's envoy to the peace process, Senator George Mitchell. (After Trimble resigned as First Minister in 2001, bringing down the first, UUP-SDLP-led, post-Agreement executive, Mitchell's report was the basis on which PIRA finally agreed procedures to put its weaponry "beyond use", a process not completed until 2005).

In the Multi-Party Agreement signed in Belfast on Good Friday, 10 April 1998, Hume and Adams conceded the Ulster Unionist conditions for cross-border bodies, and the amendment of Articles 2 and 3 of the Irish constitution. In return, the unionists had to accept that a new power-sharing executive would not, as in 1974, be a voluntary coalition. On a principle of elective inclusion which Hume and his SDLP team had been alone in proposing, seats at the ministerial table would be allocated to Assembly parties on the proportional D'Hondt system. This meant that unionists could not avoid sitting across from, and sharing office with, those they had continued to describe as "Sinn Féin-IRA".

== Post-Agreement ==
=== Recognition ===
When on 1 July 1998, the new Northern Ireland Assembly nominated the Ulster Unionist leader, David Trimble as First Minister, it was expected that Hume, as the leader of the largest nationalist party, would assume the joint office of Deputy First Minister. Instead, he handed this role to Seamus Mallon. Some political journalists cited a "reserved" relationship between Hume and Trimble, despite the two men having together received the 1998 Nobel Peace Prize.

In their citation, the Norwegian Nobel Committee observed that over the thirty years of national, religious and social conflict in Northern Ireland, John Hume had been "the clearest and most consistent of Northern Ireland’s political leaders in his work for a peaceful solution. The foundations of the peace agreement signed on Good Friday 1998 reflect principles which he has stood for".

Hume has been the only person to combine the Nobel Peace Prize with two other major international peace awards, the Martin Luther Award (1999) and the Gandhi Peace Prize (2001).

In 2010, Hume topped a viewer poll by the Irish national broadcaster RTÉ as "Ireland's Greatest" ahead of Michael Collins, Mary Robinson, James Connolly, and Bono.

In 2012, Pope Benedict XVI made Hume a Knight Commander of the Papal Order of St. Gregory the Great.

=== Retirement ===
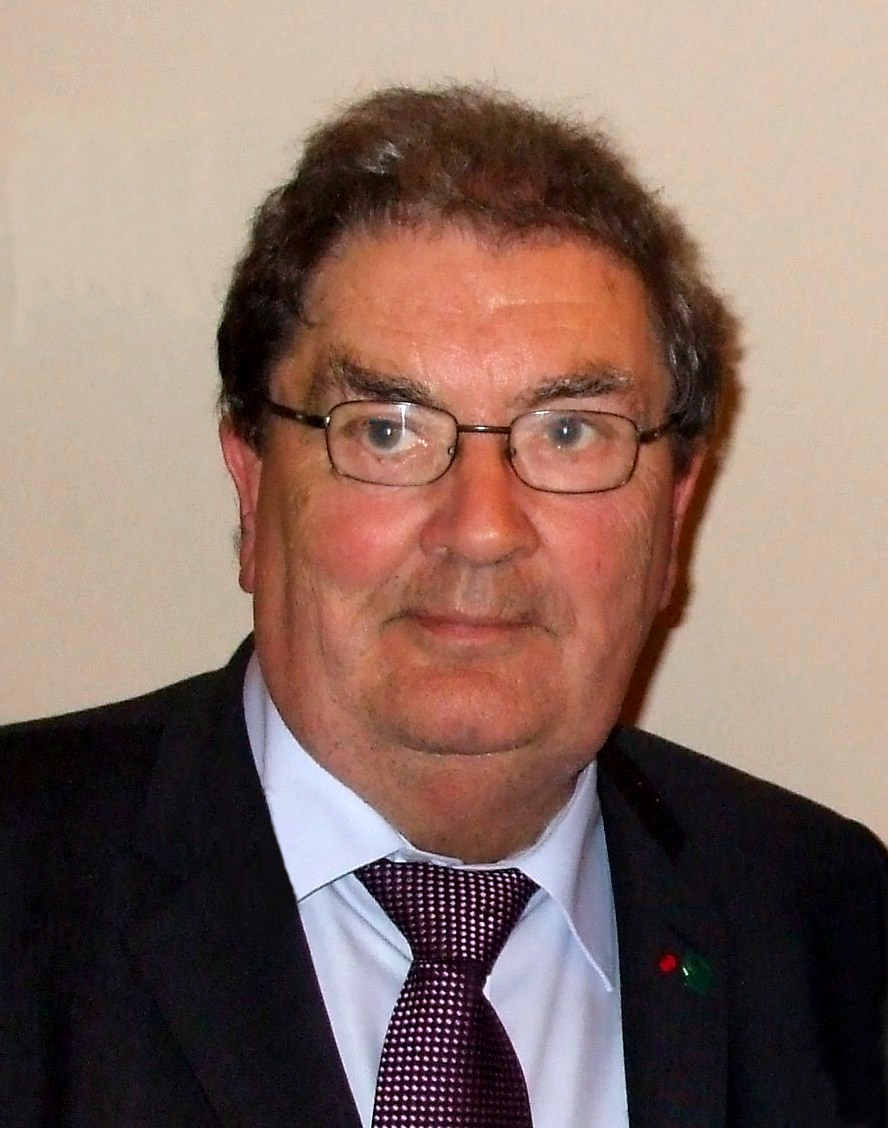
Hume in 2008

On 4 February 2004, Hume announced his complete retirement from politics and was succeeded by Mark Durkan as SDLP leader. He did not contest the 2004 European election (when his seat was won by Bairbre de Brún of Sinn Féin), nor did he run in the 2005 general election, in which Mark Durkan retained the Foyle constituency for the SDLP.

Hume and his wife, Pat, continued to be active in promoting European integration, issues around global poverty and the Credit Union movement. He was also a supporter of the Campaign for the Establishment of a United Nations Parliamentary Assembly, an organisation which campaigns for democratic reformation of the United Nations. In retirement, he continued to speak publicly, including a visit to Seton Hall University in New Jersey in 2005, the first Summer University of Democracy of the Council of Europe (Strasbourg, 10–14 July 2006), and at St Thomas University, Fredericton, New Brunswick, Canada, on 18 July 2007. A building added to the National University of Ireland, Maynooth, was named after him. Hume held the position of Club President of his local football team, Derry City F.C., which he supported all his life. He was a patron of the children's charity Plan International Ireland.

== Family ==
In 1960, Hume married Patricia "Pat" Hone (22 February 1938 – 2 September 2021), a primary school teacher, whom he had first met two years earlier at a dancehall in Muff, County Donegal. The couple had five children - Thérèse, Áine, Aidan, John and Mo - as well as 16 grandchildren and two great-grandchildren. The family was not always shielded from the invective and threats directed at John Hume. In addition to the attempted kidnapping of Áine in 1973, Thérèse Hume recalls: “a lot of threatening letters, threatening phone calls, bullets sent in the post one time, a couple of bullets sent at different times. That kind of thing was going on for quite a while and there was an undercurrent of nastiness”.

== Death and tributes ==
In 2015, Hume was diagnosed with Alzheimer's disease, of which he had first displayed symptoms in the late 1990s. Hume died in the early hours of 3 August 2020 at a nursing home in Derry, at the age of 83.

On his death, former Labour leader and prime minister Tony Blair said: "John Hume was a political titan; a visionary who refused to believe the future had to be the same as the past." The Dalai Lama said on Twitter: "John Hume's deep conviction in the power of dialogue and negotiations to resolve conflict was unwavering... It was his leadership and his faith in the power of negotiations that enabled the 1998 Good Friday Agreement to be reached. His steady persistence set an example for us all to follow."

Following the Good Friday Agreement, Hume's former Unionist ministerial colleague, Basil McIvor, allowed that Hume had been "a force in compelling Unionists, and rightly so, to engage in dialogue with their arch enemy, Sinn Féin". Hume's deputy, and successor as SDLP party leader, Seamus Mallon suggested that this was at the cost of "almost validating" what the PIRA had done over the past 30 years. But Hume, in Mallon's view, had been "no fool". If he allowed himself to be played by Gerry Adams and the Provisional movement to gain respectability, it had been in the conviction that "if it saved a single life" any sacrifice made by his own party was worth it.

== Legacy ==
=== John and Pat Hume Foundation ===
Following the death of Pat Hume in September 2021, a John and Pat Hume Foundation for Peace and Reconciliation was launched by members of the Hume family, civil rights campaigners and former political colleagues. Prominent among the patrons were President Clinton's peace envoy, former US Senator George Mitchell, former Irish President Mary McAleese and Martin Luther King III, the son of the murdered U.S. civil rights leader. Current board members include former SDLP leader Mark Durkan, former Ulster Unionist leader Mike Nesbitt, and Sara Canning, the partner of murdered journalist Lyra McKee. It describes its mission as supporting and inspiring "leadership for peaceful change", recognising that "the most effective change-makers are often Quiet Leaders – those who may not have an official role in their local power structure".

=== John Hume Peace Prize ===
Marking its Presidency of the European Council In 2026, the Irish government established an annual John Hume Peace Prize award to be given to a "European who has contributed to the values which John advocated for and to the further development of our union". In making the announcement to the European Parliament, the Taoiseach, Micheál Martin, described Hume as "one of the most distinguished former MEPs and unquestionably one of the greatest figures in modern Irish history".

== Awards and honours ==
- Hessian Peace Prize, 1995
- LL.D. (honoris causa), Boston College, 1995 (one of 44 honorary doctorates Hume was awarded)
- LL.D. (honoris causa), University College Galway, 1996
- Four Freedoms, Freedom of Speech Medal Recipient, 1996
- Golden Doves for Peace Journalistic Prize, IRIAD, 1997
- Nobel Peace Prize (co-recipient), 1998
- Officier de Légion d’Honneur, France, 1999
- Martin Luther King Award, 1999
- Blessed are the Peacemakers Award from Catholic Theological Union, 2000
- International Gandhi Peace Prize, 2001
- Golden Plate Award of the American Academy of Achievement, 2002
- Freedom of two cities; Derry City in 2000 & Cork in 2004
- Honorary D.Litt., St. Thomas University, Fredericton, N.B., 2007
- Honorary Patron, University Philosophical Society, Trinity College Dublin, 2007
- Ireland's Greatest (public poll conducted by RTÉ), 2010
- Knight of Saint Gregory, 2012

== Works ==
- John Hume, Derry Beyond the Walls: Social and Economic Aspects of the Growth of Derry, Ulster Historical foundation, Belfast. 2002 ISBN 978-1903688243. MA thesis for Maynooth College, 1964.
- John Hume, A City Solitary, BBC documentary script, broadcast on BBC and RTE 1964.
- John Hume, Personal Views, Politics, Peace and Reconciliation in Ireland, Town House, Dublin, 1996. ISBN 978-1570981104

== Biographies ==
- George Drower, John Hume: Peacemaker, Gollancz, 1995 ISBN 978-0575062177
- George Drower, John Hume: Man of Peace, Vista, London, 1996 ISBN 978-0575600843
- Denis Haughey and Sean Farren, John Hume: Irish Peacemaker, Four Courts Press, Dublin, 2015 ISBN 978-1846825866
- Sean Farren, John Hume: In His Own Words. Dublin. 2021 ISBN 978-1-84682-998-7
- Gerard Murray, John Hume and the SDLP: Impact and Survival in Northern Ireland, Irish Academic Press, Dublin, 1998. ISBN 978-0716526445
- Paul Routledge, John Hume: a Biography, Harper-Collins, London, 1997 ISBN 978-0006387398
- Barry White, John Hume: a Statesman of the Troubles, Blackstaff, Belfast, 1984 ISBN 978-0856403170
- Stephen Walker, John Hume, the Persuader, Gill Books, Dublin, 2023 ISBN 9780717196081

Parliament of Northern Ireland
Preceded by Eddie McAteer	Member of Parliament for Foyle; 1969–1973	Parliament abolished
Northern Ireland Assembly (1973)
New assembly	Assembly Member for Londonderry; 1973–1974	Assembly abolished
Northern Ireland Constitutional Convention
New convention	Member for Londonderry; 1975–1976	Convention dissolved
European Parliament
New constituency	MEP for Northern Ireland; 1979–2004	Succeeded by Bairbre de Brún
Northern Ireland Assembly (1982)
New assembly	MPA for Londonderry; 1982–1986	Assembly abolished
Parliament of the United Kingdom
New constituency	Member of Parliament for Foyle; 1983–2005	Succeeded by Mark Durkan
Northern Ireland Forum
New forum	Member for Foyle; 1996–1998	Forum dissolved
Northern Ireland Assembly
New assembly	MLA for Foyle; 1998–2000	Succeeded by Annie Courtney
Party political offices
New political party	Deputy Leader of the Social Democratic and Labour Party; 1970–1979	Succeeded by Seamus Mallon
Preceded by Gerry Fitt	Leader of the Social Democratic and Labour Party; 1979–2001	Succeeded by Mark Durkan
