= University for Derry Committee =

The University for Derry Committee or University for Derry Action Committee was a group campaigning for the New University of Ulster to be located in the city of Derry.

== Background ==
In 1963, John Lockwood was commissioned by the Government of Northern Ireland to produce a report into university education in the province. It was widely believed that he would conclude that the single existing institution, Queen's University Belfast, did not provide sufficient capacity, and would recommend the creation of a new university in Northern Ireland. A large number of groups put forward the case for siting the new campus in their own town or city, and gradually three frontrunners emerged: Craigavon, a new town under development near Belfast; Armagh, a small city regarded as Ireland's religious capital; and Derry, the second largest city in Northern Ireland.

Lockwood was due to report early in 1965, and by the end of December 1964, its proposed recommendations had begun to leak. Basil McFarland, former UUP Mayor of Derry, stated publicly that he did not believe that the report would "do Derry much good". In response, the Derry-based leaders of the Catholic, Presbyterian, Anglican and Methodist churches published a joint statement in support of a university for the city. This, together with the conviction that a university would attract new industry, inspired local teacher John Hume to create the University for Derry Committee.

== Membership ==
Founded in late January 1965, the committee was chaired by Hume. Its other members were Desmond Sidebottom, Brian Gallagher, Michael Canavan, Arthur Jack and Gerald Black - members of both the city's Protestant and Catholic communities. Aidan Clark, Desmond McCourt and John Carmony from Magee College served in an advisory role. In the committee's founding statement, it stated that government policy appeared to be deliberately isolating the city of Derry.

== Activities ==
On 8 February 1965, the committee organised a major public meeting at Derry Guildhall, attracting more than 1,500 people to hear speeches by the Ulster Unionist Party (UUP) Mayor of Derry Albert Anderson and leader of the Nationalist Party Eddie McAteer, both of whom remarked upon how the issue had united the two communities in the city.

The Lockwood Report was issued on 10 February. It recommended locating a "New University of Ulster" in the small town of Coleraine, in a strongly Protestant area on the north coast, and this decision was immediately supported by the Government. A delegation from the committee was in Belfast for the announcement, and the following day, it met with Prime Minister Terence O'Neill, Minister of Education Herbert Kirk, and the Attorney General for Northern Ireland, Edward Warburton Jones. Jones was the MP for the City of Londonderry seat, and was particularly concerned by the strength and breadth represented by the committee.

The Committee organised a major day of protest on 18 February, in an attempt to sway political opinion. Anderson declared a public holiday in the city, and he and McAteer led a convoy of 2,000 vehicles to protest at the government buildings at Stormont. Back in Derry, citizens were encouraged to mark the protest with a two-minute silence, and pubs were closed for the day.

== Government vote ==
The Government called a vote on the Lockwood proposals, and in order to discourage its MPs from voting against the report, it declared it to be a vote of confidence. The plans were accepted by a majority of 27 in favour to 19 against, supporters including several MPs who had previously supported Derry's bid, in particular the attorney general, Jones, who attempted to justify his vote to local party members by claiming that Irish nationalists would benefit from any split in government ranks. Robert Samuel Nixon, UUP MP for North Down, claimed in May that several prominent Derry-based unionists had opposed building the new university in their own city. Although he described them as "nameless, faceless men", he did name them: Gerald Stanley Glover, former mayor of Derry; John Brown; J. S. Bond; and Sydney Buchanan. The majority of them claimed that they had simply accepted a decision which had already been made and had lobbied for Magee College to remain open, and Nixon was expelled from the UUP Parliamentary group.

Following the vote, the Committee was wound down. John Hume subsequently claimed that the decision not to build the new university in Derry was the immediate cause of the Northern Ireland civil-rights movement and ended any hope of a peaceful solution to sectarian divides in the state.
