= Saor =

Saor is the Irish and Scottish Gaelic word for "free".

- Saor Éire, Irish republican/communist group, briefly active in 1931
- Saor Éire (1967–1975), armed Irish republican/Trotskyist group
- Saor Uladh, Irish paramilitary republican group, active in the 1950s
- Gubbaun Saor, Irish builder/architect, 7th century
