= Liam Kelly (Irish republican) =

Irish republican politician (1922–2011)

Senator
- In office 22 July 1954 – 22 May 1957
- Constituency: Labour Panel

Member of the Northern Ireland Parliament
- In office 1953–1958
- Preceded by: Edward McCullagh
- Succeeded by: Alexander Blevins
- Constituency: Mid Tyrone

Personal details
- Born: William Seán Kelly; 29 September 1922 Dungannon, County Tyrone, Ireland
- Died: 7 June 2011 (aged 88) New York City, U.S.
- Party: Independent; Clann na Poblachta; Fianna Uladh; Irish Anti-Partition League; Republican Clubs
- Spouse: Margaret Kelly
- Children: 5
- Relatives: Patrick Kelly (nephew)
- Education
- Military career
- Allegiance: Irish Republican Army; Saor Uladh

Liam Seán Kelly (29 September 1922 – 7 June 2011) was an Irish republican, who was elected both to the House of Commons of Northern Ireland (1953–1958) (as an abstentionist) and as a member of the upper house of the Irish legislature Seanad Éireann (1954–1957) (which he did attend). He was also a member of the Irish Republican Army (IRA) and after his expulsion from that organisation in 1951, founded the Republican splinter group Saor Uladh and its political wing Fianna Uladh.

== Early life and personal life ==
Kelly was born on 22 September 1922 in Dungannon, County Tyrone. His father and grandfather had both been active in republican politics. Kelly was an uncle of the IRA volunteer Patrick Kelly, who was shot dead by British forces at Loughgall in 1987.

== Expulsion from IRA and founding of Saor Uladh ==
Kelly was a prominent member of the IRA from which he was expelled for insubordination in 1951, having carried out military activity with volunteers from east Tyrone without IRA Army Council approval. He then founded a splinter paramilitary group, Saor Uladh ("Free Ulster") whose activities were largely confined to Kelly's home area in east Tyrone. In November 1955 Kelly and a raiding party of Uladh members attacked the RUC station in Rosslea, County Fermanagh. The raiders placed a mine by the guardroom window blowing it in, swept the ground floor with gunfire and moved into the barracks. One police constable was seriously injured and one raider - Connie Green was killed.

The Easter following the formation of Saor Uladh, members of the organisation took control of Kelly's home village of Pomeroy and held their own 1916 Easter Rising commemoration; there were major confrontations between the Royal Ulster Constabulary (RUC), B-Specials and republicans. In 1953 he made a speech in neighbouring Carrickmore which subsequently led to his arrest by the RUC and conviction for sedition: "I will not give allegiance to the foreign queen of a bastard nation. I took an oath of allegiance to the Irish Republic when I was 16 and I intend to keep it... Do I believe in force? The answer is yes. The more the better, the sooner the better. That may be treason or sedition, call it whatever the hell you like".

Saor Uladh focused their attacks exclusively on targets in Northern Ireland. Saor Uladh attacked six Northern Irish customs posts on 11 November 1956. Kelly disagreed with the idea of bombing cafes and bars frequented by British soldiers.

== Prison sentence and election ==
While in prison, Kelly was elected, on an Anti-Partition ticket, as an abstentionist candidate for the Stormont constituency of Mid Tyrone at the 1953 Northern Ireland general election. On being released from prison he returned to his hometown of Pomeroy, where a crowd of 10,000 had gathered to welcome him home. The ensuing riots and clashes that occurred between the RUC and Kellys supporters were referred to as the Pomeroy riots.

Kelly held this seat until the following general election, though – as an abstentionist – he never attended Stormont.

== Fianna Uladh ==
Fianna Uladh was founded in 1953, as the political wing of Saor Uladh. Fianna Uladh's basic ideology - which placed it closer to Clann na Poblachta than to the Sinn Féin of that era - was summed up by Kelly in a speech made in Seanad Éireann in 1954:

We in Fianna Uladh recognise the Constitution of the Republic of Ireland under which this State operates and we are prepared to work within its framework to extend its operation to the whole of Ireland. Recognising only the Constitution and the sovereignty of the Irish people, we naturally reject the claim of Britain and of any of her institutions to exercise sovereignty in any portion of Ireland. We decline to prostitute our nationality and our consciences by taking the Oath of Allegiance to the British Crown as a condition of parliamentary representation.

The element of rejecting British sovereignty in Ireland which was left unstated on that occasion was Saor Uladh's and Kelly's own personal involvement in acts of violence in Northern Ireland. Fianna Uladh's foundation – and its policy of abstentionism – helped to precipitate the break-up of the Anti-Partition of Ireland League in March 1954.

== Seanad election ==
It was Kelly's association with Clann na Poblachta led to his nomination to the Seanad. In return for the Clann's support for the Second Inter-party Government (1954–1957), Taoiseach John A. Costello ensured that the votes of Fine Gael councillors elected Kelly to the Seanad on the Labour Panel.

Kelly spoke as a senator, in support of a motion that all elected parliamentary representatives of the people of "the six occupied counties of Ireland" should be given a right of audience in the Dáil or in the Seanad.

The IRA's Border Campaign (1956–1962) and Saor Uladh's attacks, contributed to the fall of the Government and the 1957 general election. Costello's Government, although it decided against the re-introduction of internment, responded to the activities of Saor Uladh and the mainstream IRA by stepping up security measures against these groups, leading to the arrest of prominent republicans. In response to this and to a deterioration in the state of the economy, Clann na Poblachta withdrew its support and Costello was left with no choice other than to call an election.

== Emigration to the United States ==
In 1959, Kelly moved to the United States, and by the 1970s he was the chair of the Republican Clubs organisation there.

His death notice described him as "a retired assistant Chief Superintendent of M.A.B.S.T.O.A."

== Death ==
Kelly died aged 88, on 7 June 2011 in New York City, and is buried in Pomeroy, County Tyrone.

== Bibliography/further reading ==
- J. Bowyer Bell, The Secret Army: The IRA
- Barry Flynn, Soldiers of Folly, Collins Press, 2009.

Parliament of Northern Ireland
| Preceded by Edward McCullagh | Member of Parliament for Mid Tyrone; 1953–1958 | Succeeded by Alexander Blevins |
