= Mid Tyrone =

Mid Tyrone may refer to:

- The central part of County Tyrone
- Mid Tyrone (Northern Ireland Parliament constituency)
- Mid Tyrone (UK Parliament constituency)
