= Connie Green =

Connie Green was a member of the Irish republican paramilitary group Saor Uladh. He was shot and killed while carrying out a raid on a Royal Ulster Constabulary (RUC) barracks at Rosslea in County Fermanagh, Northern Ireland.

Green was originally from Derry, Northern Ireland, and had been a commando in the British Army. After returning home to Northern Ireland he became involved with Irish republicanism and joined a small splinter group, Saor Uladh, founded by Liam Kelly and Phil O'Donnell. Kelly had been court-martialed from the Irish Republican Army in 1951 for insubordination and then went on to form the new paramilitary group. Saor Uladh was most active in Kelly's home ground of East Tyrone. The group targeted Customs posts and security force installations, their principal objective being the removal of the border and the reunification of Ireland.

On the morning of 25 November 1955, Green was the lieutenant who led the raid at Rosslea, blowing up part of the building and storming the ground floor rooms, opening fire as they entered. In the exchange that followed, Green was shot and seriously injured. He was ferried away from Rosslea across the border to a farmhouse near Tydavnet in north County Monaghan, Republic of Ireland. He died the following morning from his injuries and was buried in a nearby cemetery. Connie Green was described as probably Kelly's best man in the organization.
