= Tom Gormley (politician) =

Thomas Gormley (29 July 1916 – 1984) was a politician in Northern Ireland, and a member of the Northern Ireland parliament for Mid Tyrone from 1962 until its suspension in 1972.

Born in Claudy, Gormley became a farmer before following his brother Paddy into politics. He was elected to Strabane Rural District Council in 1947, and to Tyrone County Council in 1950.

At the 1958 Northern Ireland general election, Gormley stood as an Independent Farmers' Candidate on a nationalist platform in Mid Tyrone, coming second. At the 1962 election, he was elected there for the official Nationalist Party. With his brother, he represented the liberal tendency in the party.

In November 1969, Gormley resigned to sit as an Independent Nationalist, and in 1972, he joined the Alliance Party of Northern Ireland (APNI). He stood unsuccessfully in Mid Ulster for APNI at the 1973 Northern Ireland Assembly election, but was elected to Strabane District Council, on which he served until 1977.

Parliament of Northern Ireland
Preceded by Alexander Blevins	Member of Parliament for Mid Tyrone; 1962–1973	Parliament abolished
