= East Tyrone =

East Tyrone may refer to:

- The eastern part of County Tyrone
- East Tyrone (Northern Ireland Parliament constituency)
- East Tyrone (UK Parliament constituency)
