= Austin Currie =

Irish politician (1939–2021)

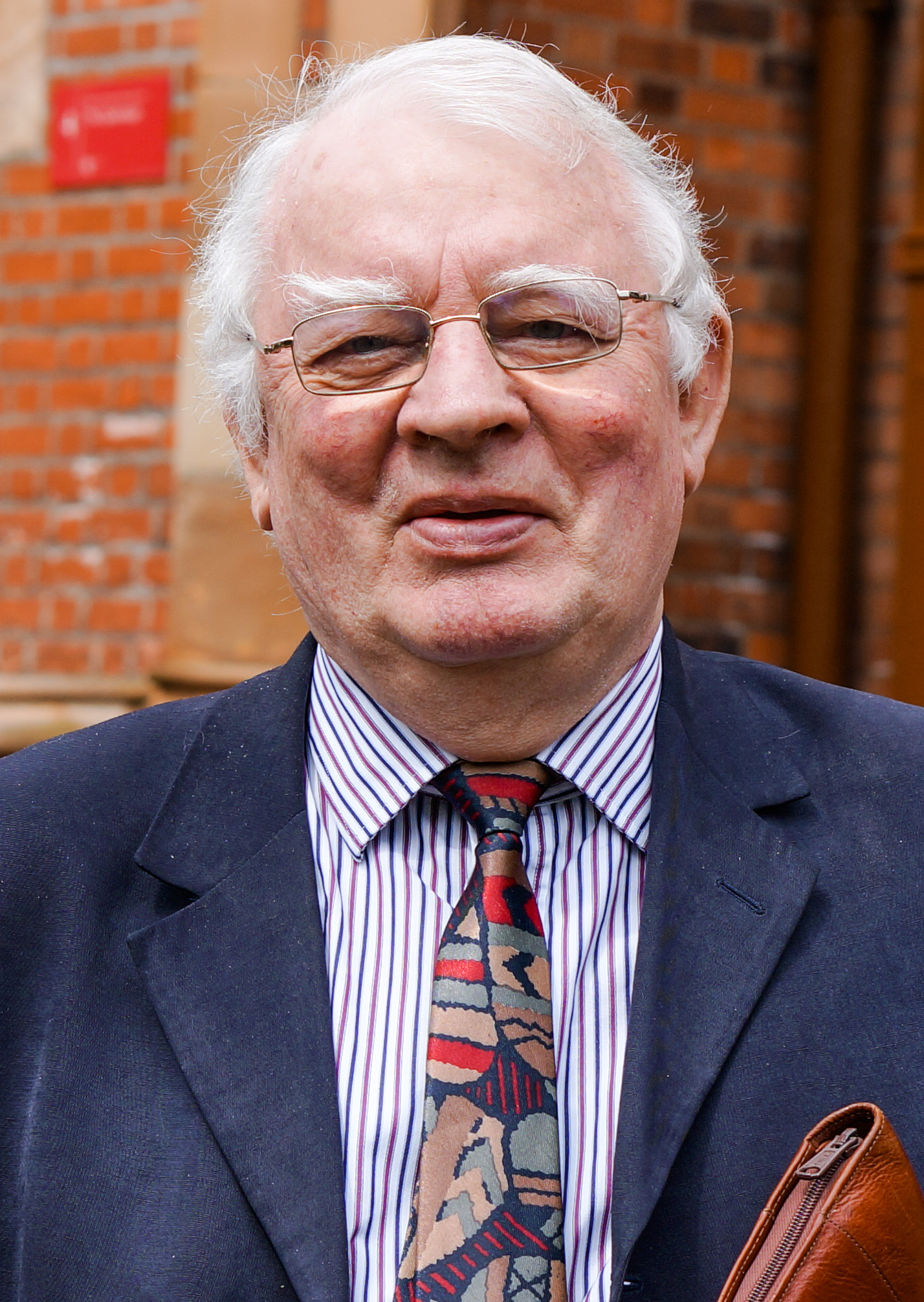
- Currie in 2014

Minister of State
- 1994–1997: Education
- 1994–1997: Health
- 1994–1997: Justice

Teachta Dála
- In office June 1989 – May 2002
- Constituency: Dublin West

Member of the Parliament of Northern Ireland for East Tyrone
- In office 30 May 1964 – 30 March 1972
- Preceded by: Joe Stewart
- Succeeded by: Parliament suspended

Personal details
- Born: Joseph Austin Currie; 11 October 1939 Dungannon, County Tyrone, Northern Ireland
- Died: 9 November 2021 (aged 82) Derrymullen, County Kildare, Ireland
- Party: Fine Gael (from 1989); SDLP (1970–1986); Nationalist Party (1964–1970)
- Spouse: Annita Lynch (m. 1968)
- Children: 5, including Emer
- Education: Queen's University Belfast

Joseph Austin Currie (11 October 1939 – 9 November 2021) was an Irish politician who served as a Minister of State with responsibility for Children's Rights from 1994 to 1997. He served as a Teachta Dála (TD) for the Dublin West constituency from 1989 to 2002, representing Fine Gael, and as a Member of the Parliament of Northern Ireland (MP) for East Tyrone from 1964 to 1972, representing the Nationalist Party and later the Social Democratic and Labour Party (SDLP).

== Early life ==
Born in Coalisland, County Tyrone on 11 October 1939, Austin was the eldest of 11 children born to Mary (née O’Donnell) and John Currie. He was educated at the renowned St Patrick's Academy, Dungannon, and graduated in politics and history from Queen's University Belfast. On 20 June 1968, he squatted at a Kinnard Park house given to a Unionist secretary during a housing protest in Caledon. All 14 houses in the new council development had been allocated to Protestants. Then a sitting MP in the home rule Parliament of Northern Ireland, Currie's protest was unanimously approved by the Nationalist Party the next day. This was one of the catalysts of the civil rights movement in Northern Ireland.

== Political career ==
=== Northern Ireland ===
Currie became an active member in the Northern Ireland Civil Rights Association. He would later speak about the effect of partition on Catholics in Northern Ireland: "Partition was used to try to cut us off from the rest of the Irish nation. Unionists did their best to stamp out our nationalism and, the educational system, to the extent it could organise it, was oriented to Britain and we were not even allowed to use names such as Séamus or Seán. When my brothers' godparents went to register their birth, they were told no such names as Séamus or Seán existed in Northern Ireland and were asked for the English equivalent."

In 1964 he was elected in a by-election as a Nationalist MP for East Tyrone in the 10th House of Commons of the Parliament of Northern Ireland, following the death of the sitting Nationalist MP, Joe Stewart. He retained he seat in both the general election to the 11th House of Commons in November 1965 and the 12th House of Commons in February 1969. This was the last election to the home rule Parliament at Stormort, before it was suspended by the UK Government in March 1972, and formally abolished in July 1973.

==== Co-founding the SDLP ====
In 1970, he was a founder of the group that established the Social Democratic and Labour Party (SDLP). From 1973 to 1974, Currie was elected as an SDLP member of the short-lived devolved Northern Ireland Assembly. In 1974 he became chief whip of the SDLP, and in the same year became Minister for Housing, Local Government and Planning in the power-sharing Northern Ireland Executive. The Assembly and Executive collapsed on 28 May 1974, after opposition from within the UUP and the Ulster Workers' Council strike. This led to the imposition of direct rule of Northern Ireland from London.

He contested the 1979 United Kingdom general election and 1986 by-election in the Fermanagh and South Tyrone seat, but was unsuccessful on both attempts. Currie also was elected to the Northern Ireland Assembly in 1982 for the same seat. That Assembly, which was an attempt by the UK Government to reintroduce devolved power-sharing, collapsed in 1986 without executive ministerial functions ever being transferred to it from the UK Secretary of State for Northern Ireland as no political agreement could be reached on power-sharing between the parties owing to nationalists abstentionism over the constituency boundaries used to elect members, and unionist opposition to the 1985 Anglo Irish Agreement.

=== Republic of Ireland ===
Following his decision to quit Northern Ireland politics, and relocate his family to County Kildare, Currie became actively involved in politics in the Republic. Partly due to his long-standing doubts about the commitment of politicians in the Republic to the plight of northern nationalists, he joined the Fine Gael party in 1989. He was elected as a Fine Gael TD for Dublin West at the 1989 Irish general election.

==== 1990 Irish presidential election ====
In 1990 Fine Gael selected Currie as their candidate for the 1990 Irish presidential election, running against Tánaiste and Fianna Fáil TD, Brian Lenihan Sr, and Senator Mary Robinson for the Labour Party. The 1990 election was the first contested election for the Irish Presidency in 17 years. Currie received 267,902 first preference votes (approximately 17%) and was eliminated on the first count. The distribution of his votes saw Mary Robinson elected as Ireland's first female president on the second count, beating Lenihan by more than 86,000 votes.

In his 2004 autobiography All Hell will Break Loose, he wrote about his experience of running in the presidential election, and the prejudice he faced as a nationalist from Ulster in southern politics: "What annoyed, indeed angered me most was the suggestion that because I came from the North, I was not a real Irishman ... what I called the partitionist mentality ... [during the election campaign] the [then Fianna Fáil] Minister for Justice [Ray Burke] said Fine Gael leader Alan Dukes 'had to go to Tyrone to find a candidate for the presidency' ... it was hard to take, particularly from so-called republicans".

==== As a TD ====
Following his defeat in the presidential election, Austin Currie held his Dáil seat in Dublin West at the 1992 and 1997 general elections. Following the formation of the so-called Rainbow Coalition between Fine Gael, Labour and Democratic Left, on 20 December 1994 newly appointed Taoiseach John Bruton appointed Currie as a Minister of State with responsibility for Children's Rights at the Departments of Health, Education and Justice, becoming the first ever minister in an Irish Government with dedicated responsibility for children. He held this post until the appointment of a new Irish Government on 26 June 1997 following the 1997 Irish general election.

At the 2002 general election Currie contested the new constituency of Dublin Mid-West, and failed to be elected. He immediately announced his retirement from electoral politics. He continued to speak and campaign for civil rights across the island of Ireland and for causes he believed in, such as justice for the families of the Disappeared during the Troubles. Currie and his wife and family were personal friends of the family of one of the Disappeared, Columba McVeigh, from Donaghmore, County Tyrone. His daughter Emer Currie was elected in his former constituency of Dublin West at the 2024 general election.

== Personal life ==
Austin Currie met his wife Annita (née Lynch) in 1961 while he was studying Modern History and Politics at Queens University Belfast, where she was also a student. They were married in January 1968 and had five children, including Emer Currie, who is a Member of the 34th Dáil.

In the 1960s and 1970s, he and his family were the repeated targets of loyalist paramilitary attacks on their home in Co Tyrone. When the Troubles broke out in August 1969, Currie was informed by a trusted source that members of the B-Specials intended to carry out a gun attack on his home. In total there were more than thirty attacks on the Currie family home during the Troubles. In November 1972, his wife Anita suffered a brutal attack when two armed and masked men burst into her home looking to attack her husband, who happened to be away at a political speaking engagement in Co Cork that evening. Speaking about it in a TV interview two days later, Anita Currie spoke of how she was punched, cut with a blade, and kicked unconscious while lying on the floor, while her two young daughters looked on helplessly. As a result of these risks, and his growing disillusionment with the political direction the SDLP was taking, Currie quit Northern Ireland politics and relocated his family to the Republic of Ireland.

Speaking in Dáil Éireann on the impact of partition of Ireland upon the Nationalist community in Northern Ireland, Currie said in 1999:

Partition was used to try to cut us off from the rest of the Irish nation. Unionists did their best to stamp out our nationalism and, the educational system, to the extent it could organise it, was oriented to Britain and we were not even allowed to use names such as Séamus or Seán. When my brothers' godparents went to register their birth, they were told no such names as Séamus or Seán existed in Northern Ireland and were asked for the English equivalent. Many people do not realise the extent to which an alien loyalty was imposed on people. As a Member of Parliament in Stormont in the late 1960s, I tabled parliamentary questions on the number of employees of central Government, local government and its committees who were forced to take the oath of allegiance to the Queen as a precondition to getting a job. This applied even to what could be described as menial jobs such as brushing the streets, cleaning the drains or as we call them in the North cleaning out the seoch. The Unionists went to this extent to stamp out our nationalist identity.

Austin Currie resided in County Kildare. He occasionally lectured and gave talks on issues relating to The Troubles, and for causes he believed in, such as justice for the families of the Disappeared during the Troubles.

Following the deaths of Seamus Mallon and John Hume in January and August 2020 respectively, Austin Currie became the last surviving founder of the SDLP.

Austin Currie died on 9 November 2021 at the age of 82 at his residence in Derrymullen, County Kildare. Following an initial funeral mass in Allentown, County Kildare, his remains were transferred to his original family home in Edendork, near Dungannon, County Tyrone, where a second funeral mass was celebrated at St. Malachy's Church, Edendork. He is buried alongside his parents in the cemetery adjoining the church.

His brother, Vincent, served as a SDLP member of Dungannon and South Tyrone Borough Council from 1985 to 2011.

== Writing ==
- Currie, Austin (2004). All Hell Will Break Loose. Dublin: O'Brien Press.

Parliament of Northern Ireland
Preceded by Joe Stewart	Member of Parliament for East Tyrone; 1964–1973	Parliament abolished
Northern Ireland Assembly (1973)
New assembly	Assembly Member for Fermanagh & South Tyrone; 1973–1974	Assembly abolished
Northern Ireland Constitutional Convention
New convention	Member for Fermanagh & South Tyrone; 1975–1976	Convention dissolved
Northern Ireland Assembly (1982)
New assembly	MPA for Fermanagh and South Tyrone; 1982–1986	Assembly abolished

Dáil	Election	Deputy (Party)	Deputy (Party)	Deputy (Party)	Deputy (Party)	Deputy (Party)
22nd	1981	Jim Mitchell (FG)	Brian Lenihan Snr (FF)	Richard Burke (FG)	Eileen Lemass (FF)	Brian Fleming (FG)
23rd	1982 (Feb)	Jim Mitchell (FG)	Brian Lenihan Snr (FF)	Richard Burke (FG)	Liam Lawlor (FF)	Brian Fleming (FG)
23rd	1982 by-election	Jim Mitchell (FG)	Brian Lenihan Snr (FF)	Liam Skelly (FG)	Liam Lawlor (FF)	Brian Fleming (FG)
24th	1982 (Nov)	Jim Mitchell (FG)	Brian Lenihan Snr (FF)	Liam Skelly (FG)	Eileen Lemass (FF)	Tomás Mac Giolla (WP)
25th	1987	Jim Mitchell (FG)	Brian Lenihan Snr (FF)	Pat O'Malley (PDs)	Liam Lawlor (FF)	Tomás Mac Giolla (WP)
26th	1989	Jim Mitchell (FG)	Brian Lenihan Snr (FF)	Austin Currie (FG)	Liam Lawlor (FF)	Tomás Mac Giolla (WP)
27th	1992	Joan Burton (Lab)	Brian Lenihan Snr (FF)	Austin Currie (FG)	Liam Lawlor (FF)	4 seats 1992–2002
27th	1996 by-election	Joan Burton (Lab)	Brian Lenihan Jnr (FF)	Austin Currie (FG)	Liam Lawlor (FF)	4 seats 1992–2002
28th	1997	Joe Higgins (SP)	Brian Lenihan Jnr (FF)	Austin Currie (FG)	Liam Lawlor (FF)	4 seats 1992–2002
29th	2002	Joe Higgins (SP)	Brian Lenihan Jnr (FF)	Joan Burton (Lab)	3 seats 2002–2011	
30th	2007	Leo Varadkar (FG)	Brian Lenihan Jnr (FF)	Joan Burton (Lab)	3 seats 2002–2011	
31st	2011	Leo Varadkar (FG)	Brian Lenihan Jnr (FF)	Joan Burton (Lab)	Joe Higgins (SP)	4 seats 2011–2024
31st	2011 by-election	Leo Varadkar (FG)	Patrick Nulty (Lab)	Joan Burton (Lab)	Joe Higgins (SP)	4 seats 2011–2024
31st	2014 by-election	Leo Varadkar (FG)	Ruth Coppinger (SP)	Joan Burton (Lab)	Joe Higgins (SP)	4 seats 2011–2024
32nd	2016	Leo Varadkar (FG)	Ruth Coppinger (AAA–PBP)	Joan Burton (Lab)	Jack Chambers (FF)	4 seats 2011–2024
33rd	2020	Leo Varadkar (FG)	Paul Donnelly (SF)	Roderic O'Gorman (GP)	Jack Chambers (FF)	4 seats 2011–2024
34th	2024	Emer Currie (FG)	Paul Donnelly (SF)	Roderic O'Gorman (GP)	Jack Chambers (FF)	Ruth Coppinger (PBP–S)
