= Edward Warburton Jones =

Northern Irish politician (1912–1993)

Sir Edward Warburton Jones PC PC (NI) QC (3 July 1912 – 17 March 1993) was a Northern Irish barrister, judge, and politician.

Jones, son of a Resident Magistrate, was educated at Portora Royal School and Trinity College Dublin. He was called to the Northern Ireland Bar in 1933, took silk in 1948, and was called to the English Bar (Middle Temple) in 1964. In 1951, he was elected to the House of Commons of Northern Ireland as Unionist member for Londonderry City, and was appointed as Attorney General for Northern Ireland in 1964, and to the Privy Council of Northern Ireland in 1965, entitling him to the style "The Right Honourable".

In 1968, he resigned from Parliament and from political office upon appointment as a judge of the High Court of Northern Ireland, and then as a Lord Justice of Appeal of Northern Ireland in 1973, when he was also knighted. In 1979 he was appointed to the Privy Council of the United Kingdom. He retired in 1984 and died in 1993.

He served as a Lay Member of the General Synod of the Church of Ireland and was Chancellor of the Diocese of Derry and Raphoe from 1945 to 1964 and of the Diocese of Connor from 1959 to 1964 and from 1978 to 1981.

== Death ==
Jones died in 1993 at Craig-y-Mor, the large coastal mansion inherited through his wife's family, in Treaddur Bay, Isle of Anglesey; he died at Headbourne Worthy.

Sir Edward and his wife, Margaret Anne Crosland Smellie (died 1953), had three sons:

- Peter Warburton-Jones (died 2001), barrister in England and, latterly, Northern Ireland
- Anthony Graham Hume Jones, Resident Judge in Taunton
- Hume Riversdale Jones (died 2007), Director of Savile in Hampshire

== Sources ==
- Profile, election.demon.co.uk; accessed 9 May 2015.

Parliament of Northern Ireland
Preceded by James Godfrey MacManaway	Member of Parliament for City of Londonderry; 1951–1968	Succeeded by Albert Anderson
Political offices
Preceded by Brian Maginess	Attorney General for Northern Ireland; 1964–1968	Succeeded by Basil Kelly
