= Edward Sullivan Murphy =

Irish barrister, judge and politician (1880–1945)

Edward Sullivan Murphy PC(NI) KC (3 February 1880 – 3 December 1945) was an Irish barrister, judge and politician. He was brother-in-law to the first Lord Chief Justice of Northern Ireland, Sir Denis Henry, Bt. (they both married daughters of Lord Justice Hugh Holmes).

He was the fourth son of James Murphy (1823-1901), judge of the High Court of Justice in Ireland, and Mary Keogh, daughter of William Keogh, judge of the Court of Common Pleas (Ireland) and Kate Rooney.

He was educated at Charterhouse School, Surrey, and Trinity College, Dublin where he studied Classics. He was called to the Irish Bar in 1903 and the English Bar in 1921.

He was elected to the Northern Ireland Senate as an Ulster Unionist Party member on 22 March 1929, but resigned on 11 April of the same year in order to contest the City of Londonderry seat at the 1929 Northern Ireland general election. He thus had the shortest term of any Senator in Northern Ireland.

Murphy won the seat, and held it at subsequent elections. He served as Attorney General for Northern Ireland from 1937–1939, and resigned from the office and from Parliament upon appointment as a Lord Justice of Appeal in Northern Ireland in 1939, as which he served until his death.

His first wife Alice Holmes died in 1942; he remarried Mary Craig Buchanan.

Parliament of Northern Ireland
New constituency	Member of Parliament for Londonderry City; 1929–1939	Succeeded by William Lowry
Political offices
Preceded by Anthony Babington	Attorney General for Northern Ireland; 1937–1939	Succeeded by Arthur Black
