= McAleer =

The surname McAleer is found in County Tyrone, Ulster in Ireland, moving into western regions of Scotland. It is an Anglicisation of the Gaelic Mac Gille Uidhir or Mac Giolla Uír. It is thought to mean "son of the sallow lad". Legend says that Saint Odhar was Saint Patrick's charioteer.

== Notable people ==
- Caolan McAleer, Northern Irish footballer
- Dave McAleer, chief consultant/contributor of the Guinness Book of British Hit Singles & Albums
- Declan McAleer, Irish politician
- Hugh McAleer, Irish nationalist member of the House of Commons of Northern Ireland for Mid Tyrone, 1929–1941
- Jimmy McAleer, American baseball player
- Joe McAleer, (1910–1949) Scottish footballer
- Kevin McAleer, Irish comic
- Owen McAleer, mayor of Los Angeles from 1904 till 1906
- Phelim McAleer, Irish filmmaker
- William McAleer, Irish-American politician
- Julian Patrick McAleer, English-Danish Michelin Chef
- Stevan McAleer, multi-champion racing driver
