= Fianna Uladh =

Defunct minor party in Northern Ireland

Fianna Uladh (Irish pronunciation: [ˌfʲiən̪ˠə ˈʊlˠə, - ˈʊlˠuː]; "Soldiers of Ulster") was a minor Irish republican political party active in Northern Ireland during the 1950s. It represented the political wing of Saor Uladh, a splinter group of the Irish Republican Army.

Formed in 1953 by Liam Kelly, the group was ideologically close to Clann na Poblachta and sought the extension of the Constitution of Ireland to the entire island. Adopting a policy of abstentionism, their activity helped to bring about the break-up of the Anti-Partition of Ireland League in 1954.

Fianna Uladh went moribund during the IRA's Border Campaign of 1956 to 1962, during which time Kelly was interned. After his release he emigrated to the United States and the movement was not revived.
