= Hugh McAleer =

Hugh Kelly McAleer (died 12 May 1941) was an Irish nationalist politician.

Born in Beragh, County Tyrone, McAleer worked as a teacher before being elected to Tyrone County Council. He became the President of the Ancient Order of Hibernians in County Tyrone, and at the 1929 Northern Ireland general election, he was elected as the Nationalist Party MP for Mid Tyrone. In 1935, he followed Alex Donnelly in withdrawing from Parliament, but he held his seat until his death in 1941.

Parliament of Northern Ireland
New constituency	Member of Parliament for Mid Tyrone; 1929–1941	Succeeded by Michael McGurk
