= Phil O'Donnell (Irish republican) =

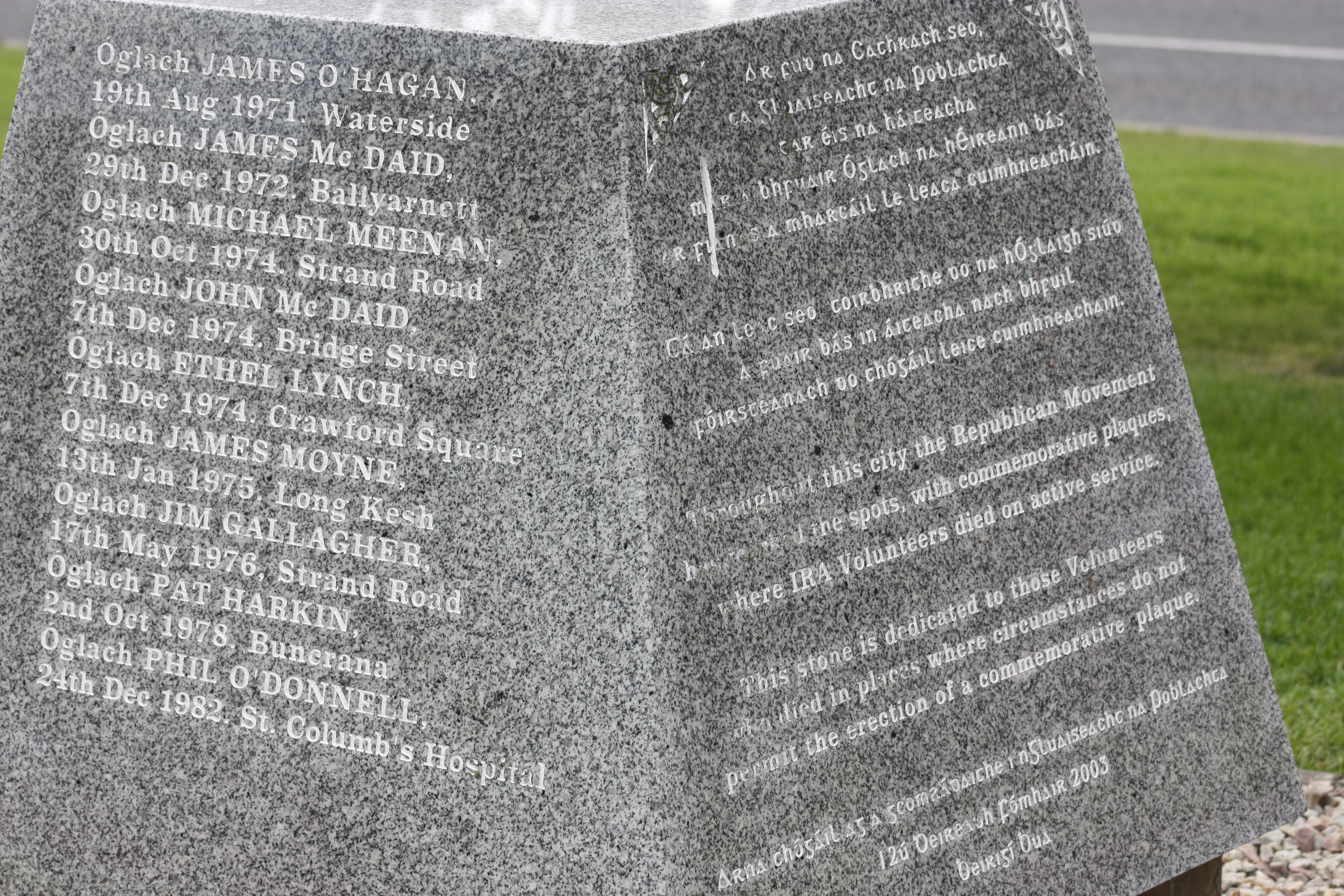
Derry Brigade Memorial, Bogside, Derry, August 2009

Phil O'Donnell (3 June 1932 – 24 December 1982), was a volunteer in the 2nd Battalion, Derry Brigade of the Provisional Irish Republican Army and a founding member of Saor Uladh from the Bogside area of Derry, Northern Ireland.

== Background ==
O'Donnell, originally from Derry, had been a member of the British Army and joined the republican movement in 1969 after the Battle of the Bogside.

== Donegal training camps ==
He utilised his training in the British Army by organising and running training camps in County Donegal, Republic of Ireland. During one training camp O'Donnell, and a number of other volunteers were captured by the Irish Army outside of Fahan. The group were remanded in Mountjoy Prison before their trial. During the trial O'Donnell stated that they were the "Defenders of the Bogside" and following their acquittal he quipped "if we are innocent can we please have our guns back".

O'Donnell then returned to Derry and the republican movement.

== Saor Uladh ==
After a number of operations had been cancelled by the IRA Army Council, O'Donnell became disillusioned with the IRA and joined Liam Kelly in forming the republican splinter group, Saor Uladh. Kelly had been court martialled from the Irish Republican Army in 1951 for insubordination and then went on to form the new paramilitary group. Saor Uladh was most active in Kelly's home ground of East Tyrone. The group targeted Customs posts and security force installations, their principal objective being the removal of the border and the reunification of Ireland.

== Internment ==
O'Donnell was interned on 9 August 1971 at the beginning of Operation Demetrius. O'Donnell was at first taken to Magilligan prison before being moved to Maidstone prison ship which was harboured in Belfast Lough. He was finally transferred to Long Kesh and was released after eight months.

Following his release he returned to active service and was arrested in the Republic of Ireland and charged with IRA membership and possession of weapons. O'Donnell spent several years in Portlaoise Prison and upon his release was again active in the republican movement.

== Memorial ==
In October 2003, a memorial was unveiled in the Bogside near Free Derry Corner which had the names of the 18 IRA volunteers from the Derry Brigade from the area who died during The Troubles and included Phil O'Donnell as well as Kieran Fleming, Danny Doherty and William Fleming.

== Death ==
O'Donnell contracted cancer and died at the age of 50 on Christmas Eve 1982.
