= Albert Anderson (politician) =

Northern Irish politician

Albert Wesley Anderson

Member of the Northern Ireland Parliament for City of Londonderry
- In office 16 May 1968 – 1972

Mayor of Derry
- In office 1963–1968

Londonderry Borough Councillor
- In office 1961–1969
- Constituency: Waterside Ward

Personal details
- Born: 23 July 1907 Derry, Ireland
- Died: 18 June 1986 (aged 78) Limavady, County Londonderry, Northern Ireland
- Party: Ulster Unionist Party
- Parents: Robert Newton Anderson; Lydia "Lilly" Elizabeth Smith
- Education: University of Nottingham
- Occupation: Politician

Military service
- Allegiance: United Kingdom
- Branch/service: Royal Navy
- Years of service: 1932–1946
- Rank: Lieutenant Commander
- Battles/wars: World War II

Lieutenant Commander Albert Wesley Anderson (23 July 1907 – 18 June 1986) was the son of The Rt Hon. Sir Robert Newton Anderson and Lydia "Lily" Elizabeth Smith, a businessman, member of Londonderry Corporation and Mayor of Derry (from 1963 to 1968).

Albert Anderson was born in Derry and educated at Foyle College and at Rydal School (Wales), followed by the University of Nottingham. He served as a lieutenant commander in the Royal Navy during the Second World War. Member of Londonderry Borough Council until 1969. He was Mayor of Derry (and ex officio Member of the Senate of Northern Ireland) from 1963 to 1968. During this period, he was a leading figure in the unsuccessful campaign to site a new university in Derry.

He was elected Ulster Unionist Party Member of Parliament for the City of Londonderry from the by-election of 16 May 1968 until the prorogation of the Stormont Parliament in 1972. Anderson was Senior Parliamentary Secretary, Ministry of Home Affairs from 26 October 1971 until 1972.

Civic offices
Preceded by Gerald Stanley Glover	Mayor of Londonderry; 1963–1968	Succeeded by William Beatty
Political offices
New office	Senior Parliamentary Secretary, Ministry of Home Affairs; 1971–1972	Office abolished
Parliament of Northern Ireland
Preceded by Edward Warburton Jones	Member of Parliament for City of Londonderry; 1968–1973	Parliament abolished
