= Craig y Mor =

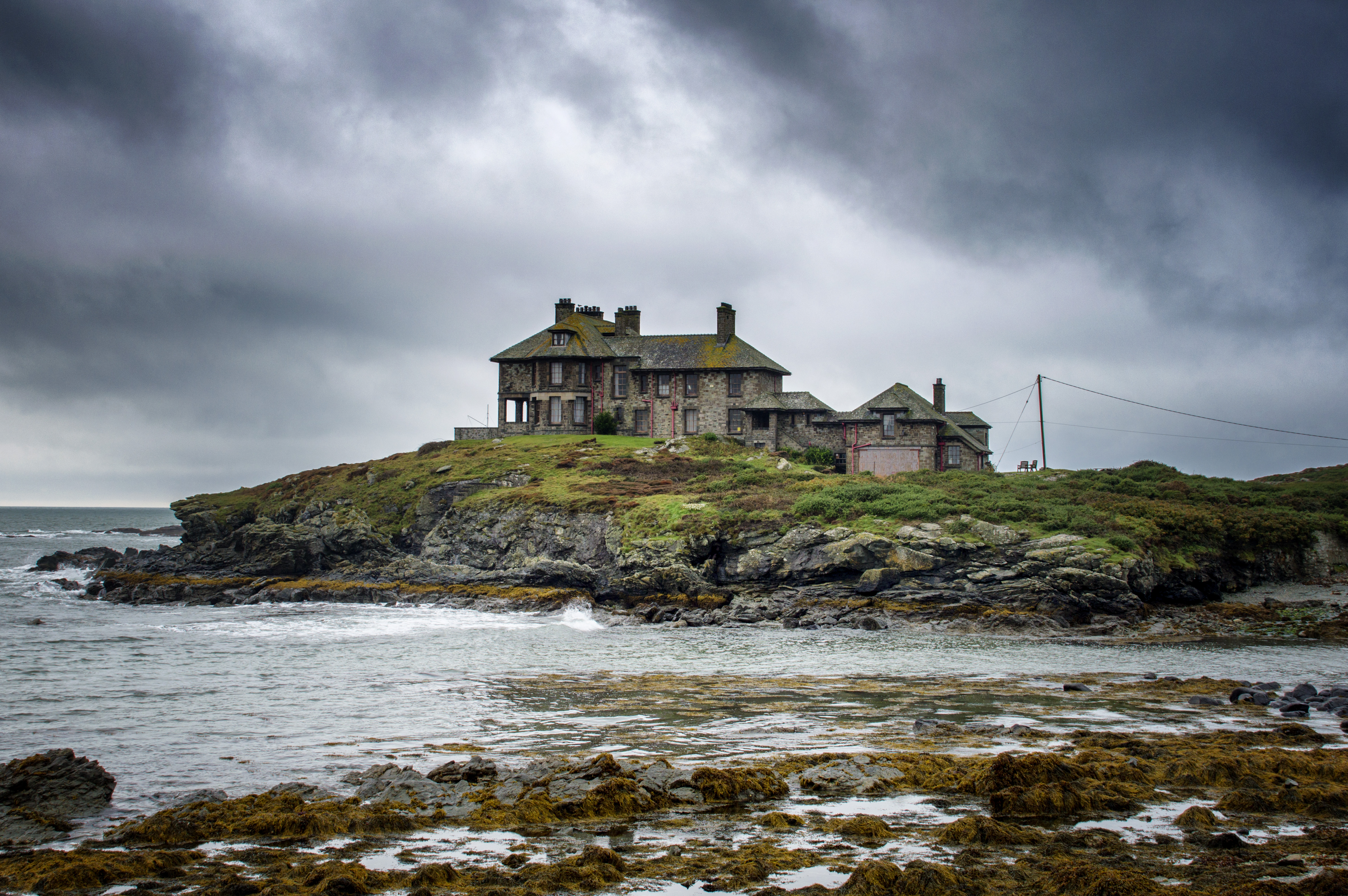
- "Ambitious in scale, dramatic in massing, and refined in detail"

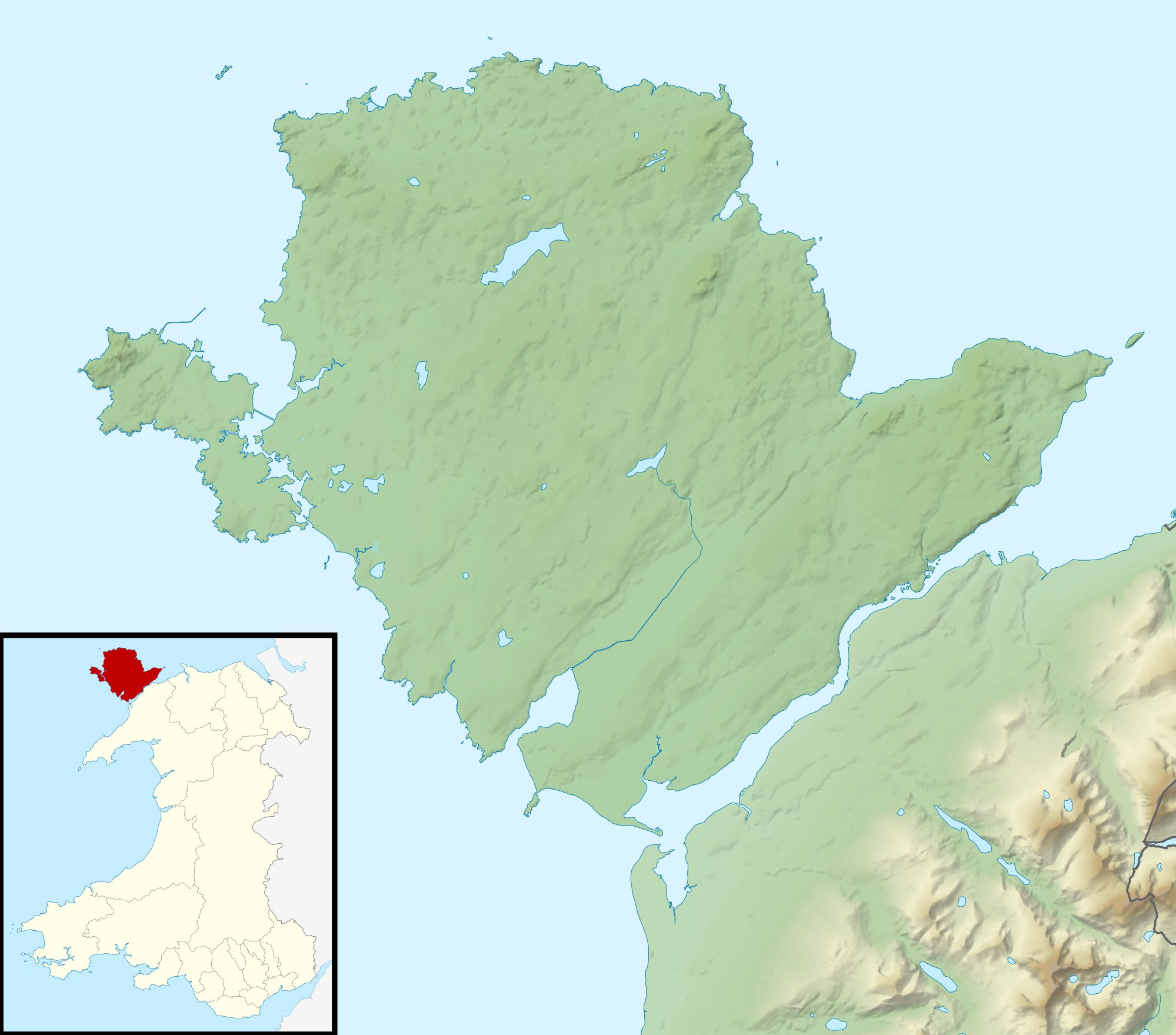
- Location within Anglesey
- 53.2806°N 4.6301°W
- Type: House
- Location: Trearddur, Anglesey, Wales

History
- Built: 1911-1922

Site notes
- Architect: F. G. Hicks
- Architectural style: Neo-Georgian
- Governing body: Privately owned

Listed Building – Grade II
- Official name: Craig y Mor
- Designated: 19 January 1998
- Reference no.: 20078

Craig y Mor is a house overlooking Treaddur Bay on Anglesey, Wales. The house dates from the early 20th century and has always been privately owned. It is a Grade II listed building.

== History ==
Treaddur Bay developed as a seaside resort in the 19th century. By the 20th century, it had become popular with the wealthy middle-classes from Liverpool. William Smellie, the builder of Craig y Mor, was born in Glasgow in the 1870s, and rose to become chairman and managing director of Meade-King, Robinson, a manufacturing company based in Liverpool which developed a highly-profitable relationship with Lever Brothers, principally in the production of soap. In 1911, Smellie determined to build a holiday home on Anglesey and engaged the architect Frederick George Hicks. Hicks, born in England, had moved to Dublin in the late 19th century, and developed a successful career becoming president both of the Architectural Association of Ireland and of the Royal Institute of the Architects of Ireland. (Note: In addition to the extensive country house practice developed by his firm, Batchelor and Hicks, Hicks also undertook public commissions. Among the most notable was his leading role in the Irish section of the Louisiana Purchase Exposition, held in Missouri in 1904. Hicks' entries comprised replicas of a number of important Irish buildings, including one of the Saint Laurence Gate. Ireland's entry was considered a "brilliant and unqualified success".) Construction on Craig y Mor was interrupted by the First World War and the house was not completed until 1922.

William Smellie died in 1955 and his widow six years later. The house remains a private home in the possession of the family and is not open to the public. It is rented for film and photographic shoots.

== Architecture and description ==
Craig y Mor was designed by Hicks in a Neo-Georgian style. It is "large", and constructed of snecked rubble with a tiled roof. Richard Haslam, Julian Orbach and Adam Voelcker, in their 2009 edition, Gwynedd, of the Pevsner Buildings of Wales series, consider the double-height bay window "overlooking the sea, its boldest feature".

The house is a Grade II listed building, the Cadw listing record describing it as "ambitious in scale, dramatic in massing, and refined in detail."

== Sources ==
- Haslam, Richard; Orbach, Julian; Voelcker, Adam (2009). Gwynedd. The Buildings of Wales. New Haven, US and London: Yale University Press. ISBN 978-0-300-14169-6. OCLC 1023292902.
