= Saor Uladh =

Irish republican paramilitary organisation

- Leader: Liam Kelly
- Split from: Irish Republican Army
- Headquarters: Pomeroy, County Tyrone
- Active regions: Northern Ireland
- Ideology: Irish Republicanism

Saor Uladh (pronounced [ˌsˠiːɾˠ ˈʊlˠə, - ˈʊlˠuː]; Irish for "Free Ulster") was a short-lived Irish republican paramilitary organisation in Northern Ireland in the 1950s.

Seen as a splinter group of the Irish Republican Army, it was formed in County Tyrone by Liam Kelly and Phil O'Donnell in 1953. Kelly had been expelled from the IRA in October 1951 for carrying out an unauthorised raid in Derry, and took some of his colleagues with him into the new organisation. The new group carried out armed robberies. In 1954, a political wing, Fianna Uladh, was formed. Kelly was later elected to the Seanad in 1954, due mainly to the efforts of Seán MacBride. Unusually for republican groups at the time, Saor Uladh recognised the legitimacy of the Constitution of Ireland and the Dáil Éireann. Saor Uladh were closely associated with the left republican party Clann na Poblachta – then a party in government in the Republic of Ireland, although no formal link was ever established or admitted.

The group was armed by contacts Kelly had in the United States of America, from whom they received not only guns and explosives but also anti-tank weapons. Despite this arsenal, the group confined itself to attacks on barracks and the bombing of bridges and customs posts during its period of activity.

Saor Uladh was involved in three high-profile attacks from 1955 to 1957. In 1955, they launched an attack on the Royal Ulster Constabulary barracks in Rosslea, County Fermanagh in which Volunteer Connie Green was fatally injured. On 11 November 1956, Saor Uladh and members of a Dublin IRA splinter group destroyed six customs posts along the border in bomb attacks. In May 1957, the group blew up the Newry Canal lock with gelignite that they had stolen.

Their military campaign saw the destruction of several customs posts and raids on police installations. Saor Uladh had its main presence in County Tyrone and in this area the IRA was forced to tolerate the group's existence due to the popularity of Kelly. At the beginning of the Border Campaign, the group was subsumed back into the IRA. After the attack on the Newry Canal, twelve of the group's members were interned at the Curragh Camp in 1957, where they were ostracised by the IRA internees.

During the organisation's brief existence, two of its members were killed.
