= Edward McCullagh =

Edward Vincent McCullagh (2 December 1912 – 28 November 1986) was a nationalist politician and farmer in Northern Ireland.

He was born in the townland of Sheskinshule (Greencastle) in 1912, the son of Patrick McCullagh, merchant, and Maggie McGurk.

McCullagh was a member of Omagh Rural District Council and was active in his local Gaelic Athletic Association. In 1948, he won a by-election in Mid Tyrone and was elected to the Parliament of Northern Ireland for the Nationalist Party. His chief interests in Parliament were farming and rural issues.

McCullagh held his seat at the 1949 general election, then worked with the Nationalist MPs Cahir Healy and Joe Connellan and the independent Republican Charles McGleenan in lobbying for admission to the Dáil, as elected representatives of territory it claimed. A motion from Con Lehane proposing this was rejected.

McCullagh lost his seat to the Anti-Partition candidate Liam Kelly at the 1953 general election.

He died in 1986.

Parliament of Northern Ireland
Preceded by Michael McGurk	Member of Parliament for Mid Tyrone; 1948–1953	Succeeded by Liam Kelly
