= J. G. MacManaway =

The Reverend J. G. MacManaway MBE
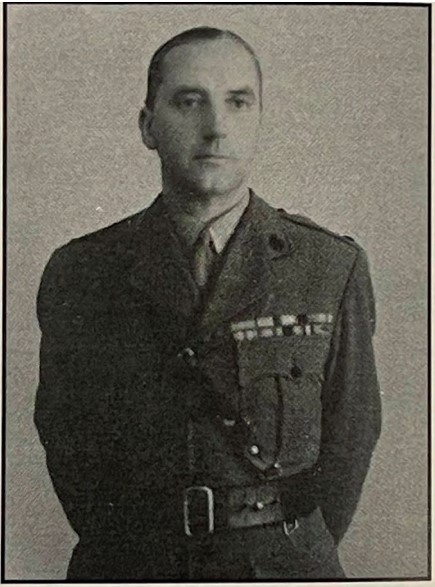
- MacManaway as a chaplain during the Second World War
- Born: James Godfrey MacManaway; 22 April 1898; Fivemiletown, County Tyrone, Ireland, United Kingdom
- Died: 3 November 1951 (aged 53); Royal Victoria Hospital, Belfast, United Kingdom
- Education: Campbell College
- Spouse: Catherine Anne Sevetenham MacManaway
- Children: At least 1
- Military career
- Allegiance: United Kingdom
- Branch: British Army
- Units: Royal Flying Corps; Royal Army Chaplains' Department
- Awards: Member of the Order of the British Empire

James Godfrey MacManaway, MBE (22 April 1898 – 3 November 1951) was a British Unionist politician and Church of Ireland cleric, notable for being disqualified as a Member of Parliament, owing to his status as a priest.

== Early life and education ==
James Godfrey MacManaway was born in County Tyrone, Ireland on 22 April 1898. He was the youngest son of the Rt. Rev. James MacManaway, Church of Ireland Bishop of Clogher. He was educated at Campbell College, then an all-boys boarding school in Belfast. He then studied Trinity College, Dublin.

== Military service and ordained ministry ==
MacManaway joined the British Army to fight in the First World War, aged 16. Serving with the cavalry, he fought at the Battle of Loos (September–October 1915). He later served in the Royal Flying Corps and the Royal Air Force.

In 1923, MacManaway was ordained in the Church of Ireland by Charles D'Arcy, the Archbishop of Armagh. He served his curacy at Drumachose Parish Church, Limavady, in the Diocese of Derry and Raphoe. He married Catherine Anne Swetenham Trench (née Lecky), in 1926. After five years at his first church, he moved to Christ Church, Derry, as its senior curate. In 1930, he took up the incumbency of Christ Church as its rector. He resigned as rector in 1947, and also "relinquished his rights as a priest in the Church" by 1950.

MacManaway served as a military chaplain during the Second World War. On 25 May 1939, he was made a Chaplain to the Forces 4th Class (equivalent in rank to captain) in the Royal Army Chaplains' Department, Regular Reserve. As chaplain to the 12th Royal Lancers, he took part in the evacuation of Dunkirk. He served in the Middle East theatre as senior chaplain to the 1st Armoured Division. He ended the war as senior chaplain to the X Corps whilst they were serving in the Italian campaign. He was mentioned in despatches in July 1945. In September 1945, Chaplain to the Forces 3rd Class (equivalent to major) MacManaway was appointed Member of the Order of the British Empire (MBE) "in recognition of gallant and distinguished services in Italy".

== Political career ==
=== Parliament of Northern Ireland ===
In the June 1947 by-election caused by the resignation of William Lowry, MacManaway was elected to the Parliament of Northern Ireland, as Ulster Unionist Party member for the City of Londonderry. He was re-elected at the 1949 Northern Ireland general election. He had resigned his seat in the Parliament of Northern Ireland by June 1951.

=== Parliament of the United Kingdom ===
MacManaway then set his sights on Westminster, although, as a man of the cloth, there was some doubt as to his eligibility, owing to various historical statutes debarring clergymen of both the Established Church (i.e. Church of England) and the Roman Catholic Church from sitting as MPs in the British House of Commons. He sought legal advice from the Attorney General for Northern Ireland, Edmund Warnock. Warnock advised him that since the Church of Ireland had been disestablished in 1869, the statutory bars would not apply to MacManaway.

MacManaway was selected by the Unionist party to contest Belfast West in the 1950 General Election. As a precaution, he resigned from his offices in the Church of Ireland. He won the election, defeating the sitting Irish Labour Party MP Jack Beattie by 3,378 votes. Among the activists working on this campaign was a young Ian Paisley.

As the first priest to take his seat in the House of Commons for 150 years, MacManaway was put under scrutiny by a select committee of the House. They were unable to come to firm conclusions and, with some disquiet, recommended urgent legislation to clarify the law. The Home Secretary, James Chuter Ede, instead referred the matter to the Judicial Committee of the Privy Council.

Their judgement, in essence, identified a lacuna in the existing legislation, which would disqualify MacManaway. While the Irish Church Act 1869 did disestablish the Church of Ireland, since there was no express provision in that act permitting its clergy to sit as MPs, MacManaway was still subject to the strictures of the House of Commons (Clergy Disqualification) Act 1801, which debarred any person "ordained to the office of priest or deacon" from sitting or voting in the House of Commons.

Reverend J. G. MacManaway's Indemnity Act 1951 (Note: Section 2(1).)
- Act of Parliament
- Parliament of the United Kingdom
- Long title: An Act to indemnify the Reverend James Godfrey MacManaway from any penal consequences incurred under the House of Commons (Clergy Disqualification) Act, 1801, by sitting or voting as a member of the Commons House of the Parliament of the United Kingdom or as a member of the House of Commons of Northern Ireland.
- Citation: 14 & 15 Geo. 6. c. 29
- Territorial extent: United Kingdom (Note: Section 2(2).)

Dates
- Royal assent: 10 May 1951
- Commencement: 10 May 1951 (Note: The Acts of Parliament (Commencement) Act 1793.)
- Repealed: 18 December 1953
Other legislation
Repealed by	Statute Law Revision Act 1953

Status: Repealed

Text of statute as originally enacted

Modern scholars have questioned the rationale of this decision but, nonetheless, the House of Commons resolved on 19 October 1950 that MacManaway was disqualified from sitting. The House did, however, indemnify him, by the Reverend J. G. MacManaway's Indemnity Act 1951 (14 & 15 Geo. 6. c. 29), from the £500-a-time fines that he had incurred for voting in parliamentary divisions while ineligible. MacManaway had voted on five occasions.

MacManaway bitterly protested at what he perceived as an unjust anachronism bringing his career to an abrupt end, but did not contest the ensuing by-election, which was held for the Unionists by Thomas Teevan. His House of Commons career had lasted all of 238 days.

== Death ==
Shortly after his leaving the Commons, MacManaway's wife died in January 1951. He also resigned his seat at Stormont.

On 22 October 1951, MacManaway suffered a head injury during a fall, having drunkenly fallen down the stairs at the Ulster Club in Belfast. He died on 3 November, aged 53.

== Subsequent change in the law ==
In the aftermath of the MacManaway case, in 1951 another select committee examined the possibility of a change in the law. However, while acknowledging the anomalous and anachronistic nature of the ancient legislation, and taking soundings from various Christian denominations, the Committee recommended no specific change to the law. The law only applied to certain priests in the Anglican and Roman Catholic Churches and did not apply to denominations such as the Presbyterian Church in Ireland. - as such, ministers such as Martin Smyth successfully served as MPs.

There the matter lay for almost 50 years, until David Cairns was selected to fight the safe Labour seat of Greenock and Inverclyde. Cairns was a former Roman Catholic priest, and a re-run of the MacManaway imbroglio loomed. The Labour government introduced a bill removing almost all restrictions on clergy of whatever denomination from sitting in the House of Commons. The only exception would be Church of England bishops, because of their reserved status as members of the House of Lords. The bill came into law as the House of Commons (Removal of Clergy Disqualification) Act 2001 in time for David Cairns to take his seat in the Commons.

== Arms ==
Coat of arms of J. G. MacManaway

Notes
Granted 10 December 1917 by George James Burtchaell, Deputy Ulster King of Arms.
Crest
A demi-lion rampant Gules holding between the paws a hand fesswise couped at the wrist Proper grasping a cross-crosslet fitcheé Or.
Torse
Of the colours.
Escutcheon
Or two eagles displayed in chief and a lion rampant in base all Gules.
Motto
Per Fidem In Deo Vincimus

== See also ==
- List of United Kingdom MPs with the shortest service

== Sources ==
- Who's Who of British MPs: Volume IV, 1945–1979 by Michael Stenton and Stephen Lees (Harvester, Brighton, 1979); ISBN 0-85527-335-6

Parliament of Northern Ireland
Preceded by William Lowry	Member of Parliament for City of Londonderry; 1947–1951	Succeeded by Edward Warburton Jones
Parliament of the United Kingdom
Preceded by Jack Beattie	Member of Parliament for Belfast West; February 1950 – October 1950	Succeeded by Thomas Leslie Teevan
