= City of Londonderry (Northern Ireland Parliament constituency) =

Parliamentary constituency in the United Kingdom

Coordinates: 54.994°N 7.326°W

- Former Borough constituency for the Parliament of Northern Ireland
- City of Londonderry shown within Northern Ireland

Former constituency
- Created: 1929
- Abolished: 1973
- Election method: First past the post

The City of Londonderry parliamentary constituency was a single member constituency in the Parliament of Northern Ireland. It was created in 1929, as one of the five single member constituencies replacing the former five member Londonderry constituency.

The constituency included the eastern part of the city of Derry and its environs including the Waterside district and Eglinton area.

The seat was held continuously by Ulster Unionist Party candidates, although it was often contested by other parties.

The constituency was last contested at the 1969 General Election. The Northern Ireland parliament was suspended in 1972 and abolished in 1973. In elections to various Northern Ireland assemblies and forums which sat from 1973 to 1986 the area formed part of a revived Londonderry constituency. Since the abolition of the 1982–1986 Northern Ireland assembly the area has been part of the Foyle constituency.

== Members of Parliament ==
- 1929 – 1939: Edward Sullivan Murphy, Ulster Unionist Party
- 1939 – 1947: William Lowry, Ulster Unionist Party
- 1947 – 1951: James Godfrey MacManaway, Ulster Unionist Party
- 1951 – 1968: Edward Warburton Jones, Ulster Unionist Party
- 1968 – 1972: Albert Anderson, Ulster Unionist Party

== Election results ==
General Election 30 November 1929: City of Londonderry
Party	Candidate	Votes	%	±%
UUP	Edward Sullivan Murphy	Unopposed	N/A	N/A
UUP hold		Swing	N/A	

General Election 1933: City of Londonderry
Party	Candidate	Votes	%	±%
UUP	Edward Sullivan Murphy	9,471	81.7	N/A
Ind. Unionist	C. G. Millar	2,214	18.3	New
Majority		7,347	63.4	N/A
Turnout		11,685	71.0	N/A
UUP hold		Swing	N/A	

General Election 30 November 1938: City of Londonderry
Party	Candidate	Votes	%	±%
UUP	Edward Sullivan Murphy	Unopposed	N/A	N/A
UUP hold		Swing	N/A	

1939 City of Londonderry by-election
Party	Candidate	Votes	%	±%
UUP	William Lowry	Unopposed	N/A	N/A
UUP hold		Swing	N/A	

General Election 1945: City of Londonderry
Party	Candidate	Votes	%	±%
UUP	William Lowry	8,529	63.5	N/A
NI Labour	W. A. Irwin	4,908	36.5	New
Majority		3,621	27.0	N/A
Turnout		13,437	71.9	N/A
UUP hold		Swing	N/A	

1947 City of Londonderry by-election
Party	Candidate	Votes	%	±%
UUP	James Godfrey MacManaway	8,901	64.6	+1.1
NI Labour	W. A. Irwin	4,873	35.4	−1.1
Majority		4,028	29.2	+2.2
Turnout		13,774	79.1	+7.2
UUP hold		Swing		

General Election 1949: City of Londonderry
Party	Candidate	Votes	%	±%
UUP	James Godfrey MacManaway	9,153	61.2	−2.3
Nationalist	F. E. McCarroll	5,794	38.8	New
Majority		3,359	22.4	−4.6
Turnout		14,947	83.6	+11.7
UUP hold		Swing		

1951 City of Londonderry by-election
Party	Candidate	Votes	%	±%
UUP	Edward Warburton Jones	Unopposed	N/A	N/A
UUP hold		Swing	N/A	

General Election 30 November 1953: City of Londonderry
Party	Candidate	Votes	%	±%
UUP	Edward Warburton Jones	Unopposed	N/A	N/A
UUP hold		Swing	N/A	

General Election 30 November 1958: City of Londonderry
Party	Candidate	Votes	%	±%
UUP	Edward Warburton Jones	Unopposed	N/A	N/A
UUP hold		Swing	N/A	

General Election 30 November 1962: City of Londonderry
Party	Candidate	Votes	%	±%
UUP	Edward Warburton Jones	Unopposed	N/A	N/A
UUP hold		Swing	N/A	

General Election 1965: City of Londonderry
Party	Candidate	Votes	%	±%
UUP	Edward Warburton Jones	8,432	53.2	N/A
Ulster Liberal	Claude Wilton	7,418	46.8	New
Majority		1,104	6.4	N/A
Turnout		15,850	81.6	N/A
UUP hold		Swing	N/A	

1968 City of Londonderry by-election
Party	Candidate	Votes	%	±%
UUP	Albert Anderson	9,122	69.8	+16.6
NI Labour	Janet Wilcock	3,944	30.2	New
Majority		5,178	39.6	+33.2
Turnout		13,066	66.4	−15.2
UUP hold		Swing		

General Election 1969: City of Londonderry
Party	Candidate	Votes	%	±%
UUP	Albert Anderson	6,480	39.4	−13.8
Ulster Liberal	Claude Wilton	5,770	35.1	−11.7
Ind. Unionist	P. C. D. Campbell	4,181	25.5	New
Majority		710	4.3	−2.1
Turnout		16,431	84.9	+3.3
UUP hold		Swing		
