= Rosslea =

Village in County Fermanagh, Northern Ireland

Coordinates: 54.2393°N 7.174°W

Rosslea: Irish: Ros Liath
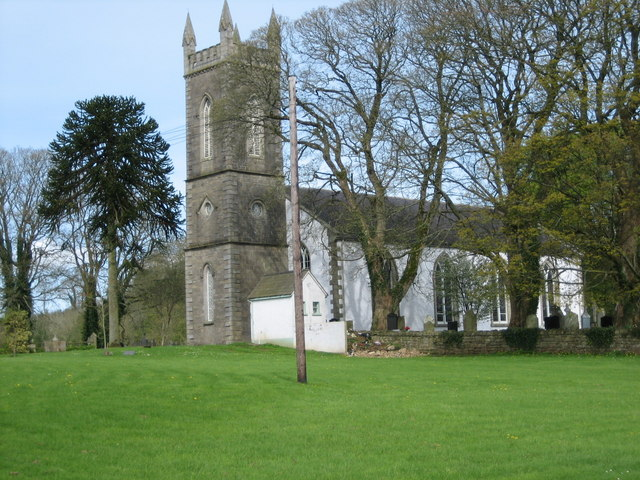
- St Tierney's Church

- Location within Northern Ireland
- Population: 482 (2021 Census)
- District: Fermanagh and Omagh
- County: County Fermanagh
- Country: Northern Ireland
- Sovereign state: United Kingdom
- Postcode district: BT
- Dialling code: 028
- UK Parliament: Fermanagh and South Tyrone
- NI Assembly: Fermanagh and South Tyrone

Rosslea, locally Roslea (from Irish Ros Liath, meaning 'grey wood or wooded height'), is a small village in County Fermanagh, Northern Ireland, near the border with County Monaghan in the Republic of Ireland. It stands on the Finn River, amid a number of small natural lakes. Spring Grove Forest, also known as Roslea Forest, is nearby. In the 2021 Census, the village had a population of 482 people.

== History ==
There were several incidents in the Roslea area during the Anglo-Irish War. On 21 February 1921, a group of Special Constables and Ulster Volunteers burned ten Irish nationalists' homes and a priest's house in Roslea as revenge for the shooting of a Special Constable. A UVF member mistakenly shot and killed himself during the attacks. On the night of 21 March, the Irish Republican Army (IRA) attacked the homes of up to sixteen Special Constables in the Roslea district, killing three and wounding others. IRA volunteers were also wounded and one was captured.

Rosslea was one of several Catholic border villages in County Fermanagh that would have been transferred to the Irish Free State had the recommendations of the Irish Boundary Commission been enacted in 1925.

On 25 November 1955, members of Irish republican splinter group Saor Uladh launched an unsuccessful raid on the local Royal Ulster Constabulary (RUC) barracks. After blowing a hole in the wall of the barracks with an explosive, they attempted to enter but were driven back by a police sergeant armed with a Sten gun. Connie Green, the leader of the raid, was shot and fatally wounded during this incident.

== Demographics ==
=== 2011 Census ===
On Census Day (27 March 2011), the usually resident population of Rosslea Settlement was 528 accounting for 0.03% of the NI total.

- 99.43% were from the white (including Irish Traveller) ethnic group;
- 93.18% belong to or were brought up in the Catholic religion and 5.11% belong to or were brought up in a 'Protestant and Other Christian (including Christian related)' religion; and
- 6.82% indicated that they had a British national identity, 66.86% had an Irish national identity and 23.11% had a Northern Irish national identity*.

Respondents could indicate more than one national identity

On Census Day 27 March 2011, in Rosslea Settlement, considering the population aged 3 years old and over:

- 29.53% had some knowledge of Irish;
- 0.39% had some knowledge of Ulster-Scots; and
- 4.13% did not have English as their first language.

=== 2001 Census ===
Rosslea is classified as a small village or hamlet by the NI Statistics and Research Agency (NISRA) (i.e. with population between 500 and 1,000 people). On Census day (29 April 2001), there were 554 people living in Rosslea. Of these:

- 25.0% were aged under 16 years and 16.8% were aged 60 and over
- 46.8% of the population were male and 53.3% were female
- 97.5% were from a Catholic background and 2.0% were from a Protestant background
- 10.6% of people aged 16–74 were unemployed

== Sport ==
The local Gaelic football club is Roslea Shamrocks, founded in 1888.

== Transport ==
Ulsterbus route 95C provides a commuter service to Enniskillen with one journey to the county town in the morning returning in the evening. There is no service on Saturdays and Sundays. Onward connections are available at Enniskillen. Due to proposed cuts to bus services route 95C may be withdrawn in 2015.
