= Derrymullan =

Townland in County Galway, Ireland

Coordinates: 53°21′N 8°16′W

Derrymullan (Irish: Doire an Mhaoláin, meaning 'Mullen's Wood'), also Derrymullen, is a 226-acre townland on the north side of Ballinasloe in County Galway, Ireland. It is in the barony of Clonmacnowen and the civil parish of Kilcloony.
