= William Lowry =

Northern Irish judge and politician (1884–1949)

William Lowry, PC (NI), KC (19 March 1884 – 14 December 1949), was a Northern Irish barrister, judge, Ulster Unionist Party Member of Parliament, and Attorney General for Northern Ireland.

== Career ==
Born in Limavady, he was educated at Foyle College, Derry, and Queen's University Belfast. He was called to the Irish Bar in 1907 and was appointed as King's Counsel in 1926. In 1939, he was elected to the Northern Ireland House of Commons as a Unionist member for Londonderry, City, which he represented until 1947. Conor Cruise O'Brien described him as a "unionist of a rather fiercer description." He served as Parliamentary Secretary to the Ministry of Home Affairs from 1940 to 1943 and Minister of Home Affairs from 1943 to 1944.

In February 1944, Lowry commented while Parliament was in session that a local Orange Order Meeting Hall, which had been used by Catholics of the US Army after he had arranged it, would have to be fumigated. His remarks, recorded in the minutes of the day, attracted immediate criticism from fellow ministers, and Lowry was forced to write an apology to The Most Rev. Dr Neil Farren, Bishop of Derry, two days later, though he was adamant that he had misunderstood the situation. O'Brien, however, maintained that Lowry's comments were meant as an ironic and sarcastic response to anti-Catholic extremists on the benches who had objected to the use of the Orange Hall, and he maintained a respect for Lowry throughout his life.

Lowry later went on to serve as Attorney General for Northern Ireland from 1944 to 1947. He resigned from the Government and from Parliament upon appointment as a Judge of the High Court of Northern Ireland in 1947, as which he served until retiring shortly before his death. He was appointed to the Privy Council for Northern Ireland in 1943, entitling him to the style The Right Honourable. His son, Lord Lowry, was a Lord of Appeal in Ordinary.

== Sources ==
- Biography: William Lowry

Parliament of Northern Ireland
Preceded by Edward Sullivan Murphy	Member of Parliament for Londonderry, City; 1939–1947	Succeeded by James Godfrey MacManaway
Political offices
Preceded by Edmond Warnock	Parliamentary Secretary to the Ministry of Home Affairs; 1940–1943	Succeeded by Wilson Hungerford
Preceded by Richard Dawson Bates	Minister of Home Affairs; 1943–1944	Succeeded by Edmond Warnock
Preceded by John MacDermott	Attorney General for Northern Ireland; 1944–1947	Succeeded by Lancelot Curran
