= Claude Wilton =

British politician (1919–2008)

- Born: Claude Wilton; 12 February 1919; Derry
- Died: 24 September 2008 (aged 89); Derry, Northern Ireland
- Occupations: Activist, advocate

Claude Wilton (12 February 1919 – 24 September 2008) was a politician, solicitor and civil rights campaigner from Northern Ireland.

Claude Wilton, son of Robert McElmunn Wilton, was born in Eden Terrace, Derry and educated at Foyle College and Trinity College, Dublin, where he studied law for three years. After qualifying as a solicitor, he operated his own practice at Waterloo Place and, later, in Great James' Street in Derry. Wilton retained his Protestant faith, but channeled his activities into the burgeoning Civil Rights activities. He was elected as an officer of the Derry Citizens' Action Committee (DCAC) in late 1968 and called for Protestants in Derry to "stand up and be counted" in regard to the early campaign for civil rights in Northern Ireland. He worked as one of Derry's best-known solicitors and often represented the poor and underprivileged, earning him the description by one leading local agitator of "the usually unpaid advocate of any Bogsider in trouble". *

Wilton was disappointed at the decision of the Unionist Stormont government not to locate the province's second university in Derry City, but in Coleraine instead. He regarded it as another example of government's neglect of the mostly nationalist Catholic city. He decided to stand for election at the 1965 Northern Ireland general election in the City of Londonderry seat for the Ulster Liberal Party. The seat was held by a Unionist, who had been unopposed in recent elections. Wilton polled 47% of the vote.

At the 1969 Northern Ireland general election, Wilton stood again in the City of Londonderry. According to Ivan Cooper, supporters used the slogan "Vote for Claude the Catholic prod". He was reduced to 35.1% of the votes cast, but reduced the Unionist majority to 710 votes and narrowly missed being elected.

Immediately after the election, he was elected to the Senate of Northern Ireland, remaining a member until the body was prorogued in 1972. While serving as a senator, he joined the Social Democratic and Labour Party.

Wilton was involved in local football, being president of the North West Football Association and chairman of Derry City F.C.

== Death ==
Wilton died in Altnagelvin hospital, Derry, in 2008, aged 89, after a short illness.
