= Michael McGurk =

Michael McGurk (ca. 1883 – 23 June 1948) was a nationalist politician and farmer in Northern Ireland.

McGurk became active in the Irish Home Rule campaign in the early 1900s. He was subsequently elected to Tyrone County Council and Cookstown Rural District Council.

McGurk was elected to the Parliament of Northern Ireland as an Independent Nationalist and Farmers' candidate at a by-election in Mid Tyrone in 1941. He held the seat at the 1945 Northern Ireland general election, and was active mainly on agricultural issues. In Parliament, he sat with the Nationalist Party group.

Parliament of Northern Ireland
Preceded by Hugh McAleer	Member of Parliament for Mid Tyrone; 1941–1948	Succeeded by Edward McCullagh
