= Mid Tyrone (Northern Ireland Parliament constituency) =

Former constituency of the Parliament of Northern Ireland

Coordinates: 54.601°N 7.291°W

- Former County constituency for the Parliament of Northern Ireland
- Mid Tyrone shown within Northern Ireland

Former constituency
- Created: 1929
- Abolished: 1973
- Election method: First past the post

Mid Tyrone was a constituency of the Parliament of Northern Ireland.

== Boundaries ==
Mid Tyrone was a county constituency comprising the central part of County Tyrone. It was created when the House of Commons (Method of Voting and Redistribution of Seats) Act (Northern Ireland) 1929 introduced first-past-the-post elections throughout Northern Ireland. Mid Tyrone was created by the division of Fermanagh and Tyrone into eight new constituencies, of which five were in County Tyrone. The constituency survived unchanged, returning one member of Parliament until the Parliament of Northern Ireland was temporarily suspended in 1972, and then formally abolished in 1973.

The seat was made up from parts of the rural districts of Cookstown, Omagh, Clogher and Strabane.

== Politics ==
County Tyrone had five Stormont MPs from 1929 until 1972. The seats in the North and South of the county were Unionist, the constituency covering the East could be considered marginal, whilst those in the West and centre of the county were nationalist. Unionists contested the constituency three times with varying degrees of success. At the first attempt in 1949, the Nationalist outpolled them two to one; in 1958 on a relatively low turn-out they came through the middle to win the seat with 48.7% of the vote. Defending the seat in 1962, this fell back to 38.6% (although the overall unionist vote numerically rose by 8), and the then Nationalist Tom Gormley was elected.

The remainder of contested elections involved candidates of different nationalist persuasions.

== Members of Parliament ==
| Year | Member | Party |
|---|---|---|
| 1929 | Hugh McAleer | Nationalist |
| 1941 | Michael McGurk | Independent Nationalist |
| 1948 | Edward McCullagh | Nationalist |
| 1953 | Liam Kelly | Anti-Partition |
| 1958 | Alexander Blevins | Ulster Unionist |
| 1962 | Tom Gormley | Nationalist |
| 1969 | Tom Gormley | Independent Nationalist |
| 1972 | Tom Gormley | Alliance Party of Northern Ireland |

== Election results ==
At the 1929, 1933 and 1938 general elections, Hugh McAleer was elected unopposed. McAleer died in 1941.

At the 1941 by-election and 1945 general election, Michael McGurk was elected unopposed. McGurk died in 1948.

At the 1948 by-election, Edward McCullagh was elected unopposed.

General Election 1949: Mid Tyrone
| Party | Candidate | Votes | % | ±% |
|---|---|---|---|---|
| Nationalist | Edward McCullagh | 8,113 | 66.9 | N/A |
| UUP | F. G. Patterson | 4,018 | 33.1 | New |
| Majority | | 4,095 | 33.8 | N/A |
| Turnout | | 12,131 | 83.9 | N/A |
| Nationalist hold | | Swing | N/A | |

General Election 1953: Mid Tyrone
| Party | Candidate | Votes | % | ±% |
|---|---|---|---|---|
| Anti-Partition | Liam Kelly | 4,178 | 55.3 | New |
| Nationalist | Edward McCullagh | 3,376 | 44.7 | −22.2 |
| Majority | | 802 | 10.6 | N/A |
| Turnout | | 7,554 | 55.1 | −28.8 |
| Anti-Partition gain from Nationalist | | Swing | | |

General Election 1958: Mid Tyrone
| Party | Candidate | Votes | % | ±% |
|---|---|---|---|---|
| UUP | Alexander Blevins | 3,949 | 48.7 | New |
| Independent | Tom Gormley | 3,013 | 37.1 | New |
| Nationalist | F. McConnell | 1,149 | 14.2 | −30.5 |
| Majority | | 802 | 10.6 | N/A |
| Turnout | | 8,111 | 63.3 | +8.2 |
| UUP gain from Anti-Partition | | Swing | | |

General Election 1962: Mid Tyrone
| Party | Candidate | Votes | % | ±% |
|---|---|---|---|---|
| Nationalist | Tom Gormley | 6,297 | 61.4 | +47.2 |
| UUP | Alexander Blevins | 3,957 | 37.1 | −11.6 |
| Majority | | 2,340 | 22.7 | N/A |
| Turnout | | 10,254 | 81.9 | +18.6 |
| Nationalist gain from UUP | | Swing | | |

At the 1965 general election Tom Gormley was elected unopposed.

General Election 1969: Mid Tyrone
| Party | Candidate | Votes | % | ±% |
|---|---|---|---|---|
| Nationalist | Tom Gormley | 5,149 | 63.2 | N/A |
| People's Progressive Party | P. J. McDonald | 2,992 | 36.8 | New |
| Majority | | 2,157 | 26.4 | N/A |
| Turnout | | 8,141 | 69.1 | N/A |
| Nationalist hold | | Swing | N/A | |
