= East Tyrone (Northern Ireland Parliament constituency) =

Coordinates: 54.646°N 6.745°W

- Former County constituency for the Parliament of Northern Ireland
- East Tyrone shown within Northern Ireland

Former constituency
- Created: 1929
- Abolished: 1973
- Election method: First past the post

East Tyrone was a constituency of the Parliament of Northern Ireland.

== Boundaries ==
East Tyrone was a county constituency comprising the eastern part of County Tyrone. It was created in 1929, when the House of Commons (Method of Voting and Redistribution of Seats) Act (Northern Ireland) 1929 introduced first-past-the-post elections throughout Northern Ireland. East Tyrone was created by the division of Fermanagh and Tyrone into eight new constituencies, of which five were in County Tyrone. The constituency survived unchanged, returning one member of Parliament, until the Parliament of Northern Ireland was temporarily suspended in 1972, and then formally abolished in 1973.

The main town in the area was Cookstown. The seat was bordered by Mid Tyrone to the west, South Tyrone to the south, South Londonderry to the north and Lough Neagh to the east.

== Politics ==
County Tyrone had five Stormont MPs between 1929 and 1972. Mid Tyrone and West Tyrone were strongly nationalist, while the constituencies covering the north and south of the county were consistently won by unionists. East Tyrone was marginal between the two traditions, with nationalists just outnumbering unionists.

Nationalists consistently won the seat, with majorities around 1,000. In the 1958 election, however, the sitting Nationalist MP, Joe Stewart, was run close by the area's Westminster MP George Forrest (Ulster Unionist MP for Mid Ulster 1956–1969).

== Members of Parliament ==
Year	Member	Party
1929	Joe Stewart	Nationalist
1964	Austin Currie	Nationalist
1970	Austin Currie	Social Democratic and Labour Party

== Election results ==
At the 1929, 1933 general elections, Joe Stewart was elected unopposed.

General Election 1938: East Tyrone
Party	Candidate	Votes	%	±%
Nationalist	Joe Stewart	7,942	54.0	N/A
UUP	D. G. Kennedy	6,764	46.0	New
Majority		1,178	8.0	N/A
Turnout		14,706	89.5	N/A
Nationalist hold		Swing	N/A	

At the 1945 election J F Stewart was elected unopposed.

General Election 1949: East Tyrone
Party	Candidate	Votes	%	±%
Nationalist	Joe Stewart	7,443	54.9	N/A
UUP	S. Miller	6,122	45.1	New
Majority		1,321	9.8	N/A
Turnout		13,565	86.1	N/A
Nationalist hold		Swing	N/A	

At the 1953 election, Joe Stewart was elected unopposed.

General Election 1958: East Tyrone
Party	Candidate	Votes	%	±%
Nationalist	Joe Stewart	7,336	50.8	N/A
UUP	George Forrest	7,100	49.2	New
Majority		236	1.6	N/A
Turnout		14,436	89.1	N/A
Nationalist hold		Swing	N/A	

General Election 1962: East Tyrone
Party	Candidate	Votes	%	±%
Nationalist	Joe Stewart	7,768	52.8	+2.0
UUP	R. Vaughan	6,953	47.2	−2.0
Majority		815	5.6	+4.0
Turnout		14,721	88.0	−1.1
Nationalist hold		Swing	+2.0	

Stewart died on 6 May 1964.

East Tyrone by-election, 30 May 1964
Party	Candidate	Votes	%	±%
Nationalist	Austin Currie	8,223	54.3	+1.5
UUP	Alexander Blevins	6,927	45.7	−1.5
Majority		1,296	8.6	+3.0
Turnout		15,150	89.7	+1.7
Nationalist hold		Swing	+1.5	

At the 1965 election, Austin Currie was elected unopposed.

General Election 1969: East Tyrone
Party	Candidate	Votes	%	±%
Nationalist	Austin Currie	9,065	58.2	N/A
UUP	E. R. Curran	6,501	41.8	New
Majority		2,564	16.4	N/A
Turnout		14,721	88.0	N/A
Nationalist hold		Swing	N/A	

The Northern Ireland Parliament was prorogued in 1972 and formally abolished in 1973.
