= 1958 Northern Ireland general election =

- 20 March 1958

All 52 seats to the House of Commons of Northern Ireland 27 seats were needed for a majority
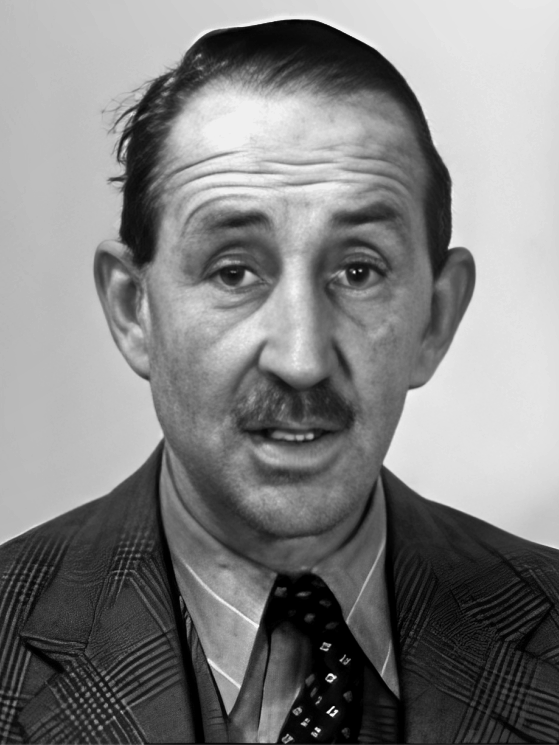
	First party	Second party	Third party
		Nat	NIL
Leader	Viscount Brookeborough	Joe Stewart	Tom Boyd
Party	UUP	Nationalist	NI Labour
Leader since	1 May 1943	1958	1958
Leader's seat	Lisnaskea	East Tyrone	Belfast Pottinger
Last election	38 seats, 48.6%	7 seats, 10.8%	0 seats, 12.1%
Seats won	37 (Note: Includes 25 members elected unopposed.)	7 (Note: Includes 2 members elected unopposed.)	4
Seat change	▼1	Steady	▲4
Popular vote	106,177 (Note: Voting only took place in 25 of 52 seats. The other 27 MPs were unopposed.)	36,013	38,093
Percentage	44.0%	14.9%	15.8%
Swing	▼4.6%	▲4.1%	▲3.0%
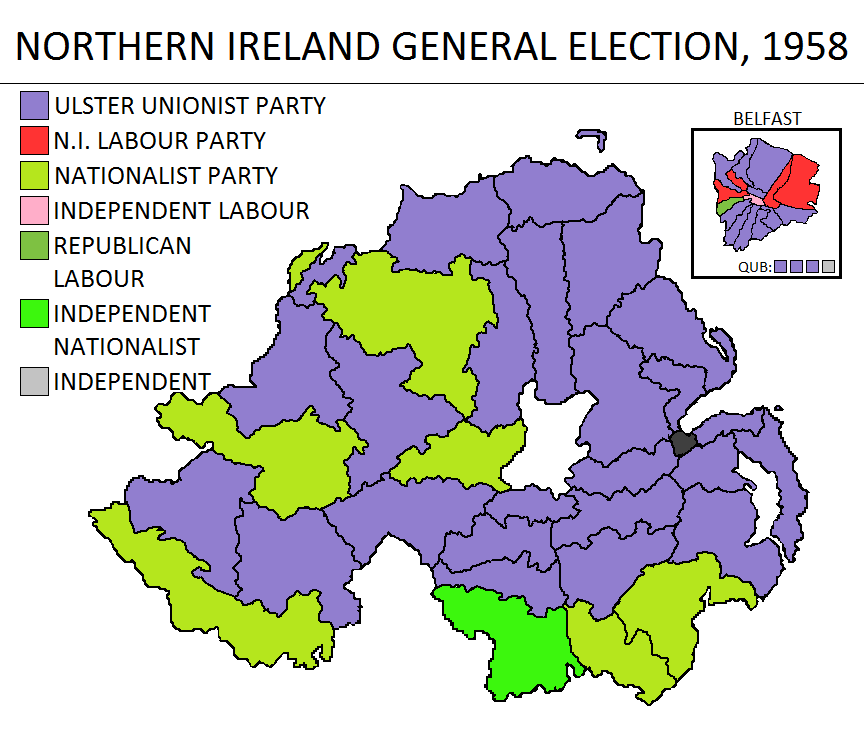
- Election results by constituency
Prime Minister before election
Basil Brooke
UUP
Prime Minister after election
Basil Brooke
UUP

The 1958 Northern Ireland general election was called on 27 February by 1st Viscount Brookeborough to be held on 20 March 1958.

Like all previous elections to the Parliament of Northern Ireland, it produced a large majority for the Ulster Unionist Party. The Northern Ireland Labour Party returned to the Commons after being wiped out in the 1949 election.

== Campaign ==
Announcing the election, Viscount Brookeborough remarked that the election would be on the Border issue once more, noting that this was the ninth election on the same issue. Unemployment was also an issue in the election with 50,000 people out of work in the province in that year.

== Results ==
↓
37	7	4	4
UUP	Nationalist	Lab	Oth

1958 Northern Ireland general election
Party	Candidates						Votes		
Party	Stood	Elected	Gained	Unseated	Net	% of total	%	No.	Net %
UUP	46	37	3	4	-1	71.2	44.0	106,177	-4.6
NI Labour	8	4	4	0	+4	7.7	15.8	38,093	+3.0
Nationalist	8	7	0	0	0	13.5	14.9	36,013	+4.1
Ind. Unionist	5	0	0	1	0	—	6.8	16,537	N/A
Independent Labour	2	0	0	1	-1	—	3.1	7,544	+0.6
Ind. Republican Labour	1	1	0	0	0	1.9	3.1	7,510	+0.8
Irish Labour	3	0	0	1	-1	—	3.0	7,321	-2.1
Ind. Nationalist	2	1	1	0	+1	1.9	2.1	5,168	N/A
Ulster Protestant Action	1	0	0	0	0	—	2.0	4,704	N/A
Ind. Labour Group	1	1	1	0	+1	1.9	2.0	4,683	N/A
Independent	2	1	0	0	0	1.9	1.8	4,231	+1.1
Independent Irish Labour	1	0	0	0	0	—	1.1	2,761	-2.5
Ulster Liberal	1	0	0	0	0	—	0.3	759	N/A

Electorate: 891,064 (359,816 in contested seats); Turnout: 67.1% (241,501).

=== Votes summary ===
Popular vote
Ulster Unionist	43.97%
Labour	15.77%
Nationalist Party	14.91%
Independent Unionist	6.85%
Independent Labour	5.06%
Republican Labour	3.11%
Irish Labour	3.03%
Ind. Nationalist	2.14%
Ind. Protestant Unionist	1.95%
Independent Irish Labour	1.14%
Ulster Liberal	0.31%
Independent	1.75%

=== Seats summary ===
Parliamentary seats
Ulster Unionist	71.15%
Nationalist Party	13.46%
Labour	7.69%
Independent Labour	1.92%
Republican Labour	1.92%
Independent Nationalist	1.92%
Independent	1.92%

== See also ==
- List of members of the 9th House of Commons of Northern Ireland
