= List of members of the Senate of Northern Ireland =

This is a list of members of the Senate of Northern Ireland.

== Senators ==
=== Senators by Parliament ===
- List of members of the Senate of the 1st Parliament of Northern Ireland
- List of members of the Senate of the 2nd Parliament of Northern Ireland
- List of members of the Senate of the 3rd Parliament of Northern Ireland
- List of members of the Senate of the 4th Parliament of Northern Ireland
- List of members of the Senate of the 5th Parliament of Northern Ireland
- List of members of the Senate of the 6th Parliament of Northern Ireland
- List of members of the Senate of the 7th Parliament of Northern Ireland
- List of members of the Senate of the 8th Parliament of Northern Ireland
- List of members of the Senate of the 9th Parliament of Northern Ireland
- List of members of the Senate of the 10th Parliament of Northern Ireland
- List of members of the Senate of the 11th Parliament of Northern Ireland
- List of members of the Senate of the 12th Parliament of Northern Ireland
- List of members of the Senate of the 10th Parliament of Northern Ireland
- List of members of the Senate of the 11th Parliament of Northern Ireland
- List of members of the Senate of the 12th Parliament of Northern Ireland

=== Senators ex officio ===
==== Lord Mayor of Belfast ====
Start	Name	Party	Notes
20 June 1921	Sir William Coates, 1st Baronet	Unionist	
27 February 1923	Sir William George Turner	Unionist	
5 March 1929	Sir William Coates, 1st Baronet	Unionist	
10 March 1931	Sir Crawford McCullagh, 1st Baronet.	Unionist	
22 May 1942	George Ruddell Black	Unionist	Died 28 December 1942
6 January 1943	Sir Crawford McCullagh, 1st Baronet	Unionist	
12 November 1946	Sir William Neill	Unionist	
8 November 1949	William Ernest George Johnston	Unionist	
1 June 1951	Sir James Norritt	Unionist	
12 June 1953	Sir Percival Brown	Unionist	
18 May 1955	Robert Harcourt	Unionist	
29 May 1957	Cecil McKee	Unionist	
29 May 1959	Robin Kinahan	Unionist	
30 May 1961	Martin Kelso Wallace	Unionist	
29 May 1963	William Jenkins	Unionist	
27 May 1966	Sir William Geddis	Unionist	
29 May 1969	Sir Joseph Foster Cairns	Unionist	
May 1972	William Christie	Unionist	

==== Mayor of Londonderry ====
Start	Name	Party	Notes
20 June 1921	Hugh O'Doherty	Nationalist	Did not take the oath
27 February 1923	Maxwell Moore	Unionist	
13 March 1925	John Magee	Unionist	
15 March 1927	James Hamilton	Unionist	
26 February 1929	Dudley McCorkell	Unionist	
10 July 1935	James Wilton	Unionist	
23 May 1939	Sir Basil McFarland, 2nd Baronet.	Unionist	
28 May 1940	Frederick Simmons	Unionist	
20 July 1945	Sir Basil McFarland, 2nd Baronet.	Unionist	
3 May 1950	Gerald Glover	Unionist	
17 June 1952	Samuel Orr	Unionist	
27 May 1954	Samuel Dowds	Unionist	
28 May 1957	John Colhoun	Unionist	
30 May 1961	Gerald Glover	Unionist	
30 May 1963	Albert Anderson	Unionist	Resigned 2 May 1968
4 June 1968	William Beatty	Unionist	Post abolished 2 April 1969

== Alphabetical index ==
Name	From	To	Party	Status
James Hamilton, 3rd Duke of Abercorn	1921	1922	Unionist	Elected
James Hamilton, 4th Duke of Abercorn	1949	1962	Unionist	Elected
Albert Anderson	1963	1968	Unionist	Mayor of Londonderry
Jack Andrews	1964	1973	Unionist	Elected
Henry Armstrong	1921	1937	Unionist	Elected
Robert Armstrong	1956	1961	Unionist	Elected
James Bailie	1955	1967	Unionist	Elected
Maxwell Ward, 6th Viscount Bangor	1921	1950	Unionist	Elected
Harold Barbour	1921	1929	Unionist	Elected
William Barclay	1925	1945	Unionist	Elected
John Barnhill	1962	1971	Unionist	Elected
Hugh T. Barrie	1921	1922	Unionist	Elected
William Beatty	1968	1969	Unionist	Mayor of Londonderry
David Bill	1949	1956	Unionist	Elected
George Black	1942	1942	Unionist	Lord Mayor of Belfast
Samuel Boyd	1955	1962	Unionist	Elected
John Boyle	1937	1950	Unionist	Elected
Charles Bradley	1951	1957	Nationalist	Elected
Sir Basil Brooke	1921	1922	Unionist	Elected
Percival Brown	1953	1955	Unionist	Lord Mayor of Belfast
Gerald Browne	1942	1951	Unionist	Elected
Joseph Cairns	1969	1973	Unionist	Lord Mayor of Belfast
William Cameron	1969	1973	Unionist	Elected
Thomas Joseph Campbell	1929	1934	Nationalist	Elected
James Edward Caulfeild, 8th Viscount Charlemont	1925	1937	Unionist	Elected
George Anthony Clark	1951	1969	Unionist	Elected
George Smith Clark	1925	1935	Unionist	Elected
William Clark	1946	1961	Unionist	Elected
William Coates	1921; 1924	1923; 1931	Unionist	Elected/Lord Mayor of Belfast
John Colhoun	1957	1961	Unionist	Mayor of Londonderry
Alec Cooke	1961	1969	Unionist	Elected
Robert Corkey	1943	1965	Unionist	Elected
James Glencairn Cunningham	1957; 1967	1965; 1972	Unionist	Elected
Joseph Cunningham	1921	1965	Unionist	Elected
Samuel Cunningham	1921	1945	Independent Unionist; Unionist	Elected
Joseph Davison	1935	1948	Unionist	Elected
James Hill Dickson	1921	1938	Unionist	Elected
Sir Thomas Dixon, 2nd Baronet	1924	1949	Unionist	Elected
Arthur Frederick Dobbs	1929; 1937	1933; 1955	Unionist	Elected
John Patrick Donaghy	1953	1968	Independent; Nationalist	Elected
Robert Dorman	1925	1933	Labour (NI)	Elected
Samuel Sydney Dowds	1954	1957	Unionist	Mayor of Londonderry
John Cherry Drennan	1961	1973	Unionist	Elected
Hugh Duff	1937	1940	Unionist	Elected
Frederick Temple Hamilton-Temple-Blackwood, 3rd Marquess of Dufferin and Ava	1921	1930	Unionist	Elected
Adam Duffin	1921	1924	Unionist	Elected
Nelson Elder	1966	1973	Unionist	Elected
Joseph Fisher	1957	1963	Unionist	Elected
Henry Fleming	1945	1956	Unionist	Elected
William Geddis	1966	1969	Unionist	Lord Mayor of Belfast
Archibald Gibson	1969	1973	Unionist	Elected
William Gibson	1935	1942	Unionist	Elected
John Clements Glendinning	1922; 1934	1933; 1946	Unionist	Elected
Daniel Dixon, 2nd Baron Glentoran	1961	1973	Unionist	Elected
Gerald Stanley Glover	1950	1952	Unionist	Mayor of Londonderry
Alexander Robert Gisborne Gordon	1950	1964	Unionist	Elected
Thomas Greer	1921	1928	Unionist	Elected
Marion Greeves	1950	1969	Unionist; Independent	Elected
Robert George Grosvenor	1964	1967	Unionist	Elected
James Woods Gyle	1933	1935	Independent Unionist	Elected
James Hamilton	1927	1929	Unionist	Mayor of Londonderry
Robert Harcourt	1955	1957	Unionist	Lord Mayor of Belfast
Sir Emerson Herdman	1923	1949	Unionist	Elected
Wilson Hungerford	1948	1957	Unionist	Elected
William Jenkins	1963	1966	Unionist	Lord Mayor of Belfast
Sir James Johnston	1921	1924	Unionist	Elected
John Stewart Johnston	1958; 1967	1965; 1973	Unionist	Elected
William Ernest George Johnston	1949	1951	Unionist	Lord Mayor of Belfast
Norman Kennedy	1965	1973	Labour (NI)	Elected
Robert Kinahan	1959	1961	Unionist	Lord Mayor of Belfast
Samuel Kinghan	1963	1973	Unionist	Elected
William Kinghan	1940	1946	Unionist	Elected
Thomas Lavery	1930	1940	Unionist	Elected
Gerry Lennon	1944	1969	Nationalist	Elected
James Graham Leslie	1921	1949	Unionist	Elected
Charles Vane-Tempest-Stewart, 7th Marquess of Londonderry	1921	1929	Unionist	Elected
John Andrew Long	1921	1941	Unionist	Elected
Louis Lynch	1949	1957	Nationalist	Elected
Thaddeus Lynch	1941	1949	Nationalist	Elected
Thomas McAllister	1929	1950	Nationalist	Elected
Robert McBride	1934	1935	Unionist	Elected
David McClelland	1967	1973	Unionist	Elected
Ian McClure	1968	1973	Unionist	Elected
Alexander McConnell	1956	1961	Unionist	Elected
Dudley McCorkell	1929	1935	Unionist	Mayor of Londonderry
John McCormick	1947	1958	Unionist	Elected
Sir Crawford McCullagh	1931; 1943	1942; 1946	Unionist	Lord Mayor of Belfast
Charles McCullough	1968	1973	Unionist; Democratic Unionist	Elected
William John McDowell	1921	1929	Unionist	Elected
Sir Basil McFarland	1939; 1945	1940; 1950	Unionist	Mayor of Londonderry
Paddy McGill	1953	1973	Nationalist	Elected
Daniel McGladdery	1957	1973	Unionist	Elected
John McGlade	1958	1967	Nationalist	Elected
John McHugh	1929	1945	Nationalist	Elected
Cecil McKee	1957	1959	Unionist	Lord Mayor of Belfast
Thomas McLaughlin	1933	1944	Nationalist	Elected
James McMahon	1933	1936	Nationalist	Elected
John McNally	1950	1953	Nationalist	Elected
John Gilbert Magee	1925	1927	Unionist	Mayor of Londonderry
Joseph Maguire	1937	1951	Nationalist	Elected
Patrick Francis Mallon	1965	1973	Nationalist	Elected
Algernon Skeffington, 12th Viscount Massereene	1921	1929	Unionist	Elected
Hugh Montgomery	1922	1924	Unionist	Elected
Maxwell Moore	1923	1925	Unionist	Mayor of Londonderry
William James Morgan	1969	1970	Unionist	Elected
Edward Sullivan Murphy	1929	1929	Unionist	Elected
William Neill	1946	1949	Unionist	Lord Mayor of Belfast
Thomas Nelson	1945	1949	Unionist	Elected
James Norritt	1951	1953	Unionist	Lord Mayor of Belfast
Sir Roland Nugent	1936	1961	Unionist	Elected
Hugh O'Doherty	1921	1923	Nationalist	Mayor of Londonderry
Paddy O'Hare	1949	1973	Nationalist	Elected
Samuel Orr	1952	1954	Unionist	Mayor of Londonderry
Hercules Pakenham	1928	1937	Unionist	Elected
Robert Perceval-Maxwell	1921	1925	Unionist	Elected
Robert Perceval-Maxwell	1935; 1941	1941; 1945	Unionist	Elected
William Pirrie, 1st Viscount Pirrie	1921	1924	Unionist	Elected
James Pollock	1954	1957	Unionist	Elected
John Porter-Porter	1921	1937	Unionist	Elected
Andrew Quigley	1929	1937	Unionist	Elected
Herbert Quin	1950	1968	Unionist	Elected
Henry Richardson	1949	1957	Unionist	Elected
John Hanna Robb	1937	1943	Unionist	Elected
Samuel Rodgers	1962	1970	Unionist	Elected
Arnold Schofield	1961	1969	Labour (NI)	Elected
Robert Sharman-Crawford	1921	1934	Unionist	Elected
Frederick Simmons	1940	1945	Unionist	Mayor of Londonderry
Thomas Sinclair	1921	1940	Unionist	Elected
William James Smyth	1945	1950	Labour (NI)	Elected
William Ernest Stevenson	1940; 1945	1945; 1954	Unionist	Elected
Kennedy Stewart	1945	1955	Unionist	Elected
William Stewart	1957	1973	Unionist	Elected
Edith Taggart	1968	1973	Unionist	Elected
Henry Taylor	1938	1957	Unionist	Elected
William George Turner	1923	1929	Unionist	Lord Mayor of Belfast
Martin Wallace	1961	1963	Unionist	Lord Mayor of Belfast
Albert Walmsley	1957	1964	Unionist	Elected
George Whaley	1941	1945	Unionist	Elected
Paddy Wilson	1969	1973	Republican Labour; Social Democratic and Labour	Elected
William Wilson	1968	1973	Unionist	Elected
Claude Wilton	1969	1973	Liberal; Social Democratic and Labour	Elected
James McElmunn Wilton	1935	1939	Unionist	Mayor of Londonderry
William McConnell Wilton	1945	1953	Independent Unionist	Elected
Joseph Andrew Woods	1921	1925	Unionist	Elected
