= Senator Stewart =

Senator Stewart may refer to:

== Members of the Northern Irish Senate ==
- Kennedy Stewart (Northern Ireland politician) (1883–1964), Northern Irish Senator from 1945 to 1955
- William Stewart (Northern Ireland senator) (1910/1911–1979), Northern Irish Senator from 1957 to 1973

== Members of the United States Senate ==
- David W. Stewart (1887–1974), U.S. Senator from Iowa from 1926 to 1927
- David Stewart (Maryland politician) (1800–1858), U.S. Senator from Maryland from 1849 to 1850
- Donald Stewart (Alabama politician) (born 1940), U.S. Senator from Alabama from 1978 to 1981
- John Wolcott Stewart (1825–1915), U.S. Senator from Vermont in 1908
- Tom Stewart (1892–1972), U.S. Senator from Tennessee from 1939 to 1949
- William Morris Stewart (1827–1909), U.S. Senator from Nevada from 1865 to 1875 and 1887 to 1905

== United States state senate members ==
- Alva Stewart (1821–1889), Wisconsin State Senate
- Ann Johnson Stewart (born 1964), Minnesota State Senate
- Charles Stewart (Harris County politician) (1836–1895), Texas State Senate
- Daniel Stewart (brigadier general) (1761–1829), Georgia State Senate
- David Dinsmore Stewart (1823–1917), Maine State Senate
- Edwin C. Stewart (1864–1921), New York State Senate
- Eric Stewart (politician) (born 1971), Tennessee State Senate
- Jacob H. Stewart (1829–1884), Minnesota State Senate
- Jack Stewart (Oklahoma politician) (born 1949/50), Oklahoma State Senate
- James Stewart (North Carolina politician) (1775–1821), North Carolina State Senate
- Jimmy Stewart (politician) (born 1969), Ohio State Senate
- John Stewart (Connecticut politician) (1795–1860), Connecticut State Senate
- John Wesley Stewart (1822–1899), Wisconsin State Senate
- Lispenard Stewart (1855–1927), New York State Senate
- Robert Stewart (Alabama politician) (born 1990), Alabama State Senate
- Roger Stewart (born 1931), Iowa State Senate
- Trey Stewart (born 1994), Maine State Senate
- W. Frank Stewart (fl. 1870s–1880s), Nevada State Senate
- William J. Stewart (Pennsylvania politician) (1950–2016), Pennsylvania State Senate
- William R. Stewart (1864–1958), Ohio State Senate

== See also ==
- Andrea Stewart-Cousins (born 1950), New York State Senate
- Sharon Stewart-Peregoy (born 1953), Montana State Senate
- Senator Stuart (disambiguation)
