= Senator Lynch =

Senator Lynch may refer to:

== Members of the Northern Irish Senate ==
- Louis Lynch (1904–1976), Northern Irish Senator from 1949 to 1957
- Thaddeus Lynch (Northern Ireland politician) (1882–?), Northern Irish Senator from 1941 to 1949

== United States state senate members ==
- Ann Lynch (politician) (born 1964), Minnesota State Senate
- Charles Lynch (judge) (1736–1796), Virginia State Senate
- Charles Lynch (politician) (1783–1853), Mississippi State Senate
- Erin Lynch Prata (born 1975), Rhode Island State Senate
- Francis Lynch (1920–1993), Pennsylvania State Senate
- J. D. Lynch (1947–2018), Montana State Senate
- John A. Lynch (New York politician) (1882–1954), New York State Senate
- John A. Lynch Jr. (born 1938), New Jersey State Senate
- John A. Lynch Sr. (1908–1978), New Jersey State Senate
- Neil Lynch (politician) (born 1934), Montana State Senate
- Stephen F. Lynch (born 1955), Massachusetts State Senate
- William Joseph Lynch (1908–1976), Illinois State Senate
