= Neville Martin =

Northern Irish politician

John Wesley Neville Martin (1916–17 April 1966) was a Northern Irish politician who served as a member of the Parliament of Northern Ireland for the Ulster Unionist Party.

== Biography ==
Martin was educated at a grammar school before becoming the director of a sack company that was based in both Belfast and Manchester. He was also a founder of the Belfast Rotary Club.

== Politics ==
He was elected Member of Parliament for Belfast Woodvale in a by-election in 1955 following Robert Harcourt's appointment to the Senate of Northern Ireland. He lost his seat in the 1958 general election when Northern Ireland Labour Party candidate Billy Boyd defeated him. After his defeat Martin suggested that the close ties between the Ulster Unionist Party and the Conservative Party were counterproductive as they were driving some working-class people who would otherwise identify as Unionist away from the party.

Parliament of Northern Ireland
Preceded by Robert Harcourt	Member of Parliament for Belfast Woodvale; 1955–1958	Succeeded by Billy Boyd
