= Senator Browne =

Senator Browne may refer to:

== Members of the Irish Senate ==
- Edward Browne (Irish politician) (fl. 1960s), Irish Senator from 1960 to 1961
- Fad Browne (1906–1991), Irish Senator from 1973 to 1977
- John Browne (Fine Gael politician) (1936–2019) Irish Senator from 1983 to 1987
- Kathleen Browne (1876–1943), Irish Senator from 1929 to 1936
- Noël Browne (1915–1997), Irish Senator from 1973 to 1977

== Members of the Northern Irish Senate ==
- Gerald Browne (politician) (1871/1872–1951), Northern Irish Senator from 1942 to 1951

== United States state senate members ==
- Edward E. Browne (1868–1945), Wisconsin State Senate
- Edward L. Browne (1830–1925), Wisconsin State Senate
- Jefferson B. Browne (1857–1937), Florida State Senate
- Pat Browne (born 1963), Pennsylvania State Senate
- Thomas M. Browne (1829–1891), Indiana State Senate

== Other ==
- Noel Crichton-Browne (born 1944), Senate of Australia

== See also ==
- Senator Brown (disambiguation)
