= Joseph Maguire (disambiguation) =

Joseph Maguire (born 1952) is an American military and intelligence official.

Joseph Maguire may also refer to:

- Joseph Maguire (politician) (died 1951), politician from Northern Ireland
- Joseph Francis Maguire (1919–2014), American Roman Catholic bishop
- Joe Maguire (born 1996), English footballer
- Joey McGuire (born 1970), American football coach

== See also ==
- Inspector Joseph Meguire, fictional character in the manga series Detective Conan
