= Coates baronets =

Baronetcy in the Baronetage of the United Kingdom

The Coates Baronetcy, of Haypark in the City of Belfast, is a title in the Baronetage of the United Kingdom (see also Milnes Coates baronets, which is a separate baronetcy in England and Coats baronets, which is a separate baronetcy in Scotland). It was created on 15 July 1921 for William Coates. He was a senior partner of William F. Coates & Co, stockbrokers, of Belfast, Lord Mayor of Belfast in 1920, 1921, 1922, 1929 and 1930 and a member of the Senate of Northern Ireland. He was succeeded by his son, the second Baronet. He was a brigadier in the Royal Tank Regiment. As of 2025 the title is held by his son, the third Baronet, who succeeded in 1994.

== Coates baronets, of Haypark (1921) ==
- Sir William Frederick Coates, 1st Baronet (1866–1932)
- Sir Frederick Gregory Lindsay Coates, 2nd Baronet (1916–1994)
- Sir David Frederick Charlton Coates, 3rd Baronet (born 1948)

The heir apparent is the present holder's son James Gregory David Coates (born 1977).

== Arms ==
Coat of arms of Coates baronets

Notes
Granted 20 June 1923 by Sir Nevile Rodwell Wilkinson, Ulster King of Arms.
Crest
On a wreath of the colours a cock statant wings closed Gules.
Escutcheon
Gules a chevron cotised Argent on a chief Ermine two bells Or on an escutcheon of pretence quarterly 1st & 4th Argent a fir tree growing out of a mount in base Vert surmounted by a sword in bend supporting an Imperial crown in the dexter canton Proper and in chief and base a lion's head erased Azure 2nd & 3rd Gules three bears' heads couped Argent muzzled Sable.
Motto
Watchful And Bold
