= Senator Armstrong =

Senator Armstrong may refer to:

== Members of the Australian Senate ==
- John Armstrong (Australian politician) (1908–1977), Australian Senator from New South Wales from 1938 to 1962

== Members of the Northern Irish Senate ==
- Henry Armstrong (Northern Ireland politician) (1844–1943), Northern Irish Senator from 1921 to 1937
- Robert Armstrong (Northern Ireland politician) (1888/1889–1961), Northern Irish Senator from 1956 to 1961

== Members of the United States Senate ==
- David H. Armstrong (1812–1893), U.S. Senator from Missouri
- John Armstrong Jr. (1758–1843), U.S. Senator from New York
- William L. Armstrong (1937–2016), U.S. Senator from Colorado
- Alan Armstrong (born 1962), U.S. Senator from Oklahoma

== United States state senate members ==
- Augustus L. Armstrong (1833–1873), Minnesota State Senate
- George C. Armstrong (1872–1950), Illinois State Senate
- Gibson E. Armstrong (born 1943), Pennsylvania State Senate
- Harry Armstrong (politician) (1915–2011), Ohio State Senate
- James Armstrong (Texas politician) (1811–1879), Texas State Senate
- Kelly Armstrong (born 1976), North Dakota State Senate
- Robert M. Armstrong (1892–1981), Nebraska State Senate
- Samuel Turell Armstrong (1784–1850), Massachusetts State Senate
- Thomas H. Armstrong (1829–1891), Minnesota State Senate
- Thomas Armstrong (New York politician) (1785–1867), New York State Senate
- William W. Armstrong (politician) (1864–1944), New York State Senate

== Fictional characters ==
- Senator Armstrong (Metal Gear), the main antagonist of video game Metal Gear Rising: Revengance
