= Senator McLaughlin =

Senator McLaughlin may refer to:

- Edward F. McLaughlin (1883–1953), Massachusetts State Senate
- Joseph R. McLaughlin (Michigan politician) (1851–1932), Michigan State Senate
- Maurice McLaughlin (1924–2000), Florida State Senate
- Thomas McLaughlin (politician) (1878/79–1944), Senate of Northern Ireland
