= Senator Brown =

Senator Brown may refer to:

== Members of the Australian Senate ==
- Bill Brown (Australian politician) (1920–2001), Senator for Victoria from 1969 to 1970 and 1971 to 1978
- Bob Brown (born 1944), Senator for Tasmania from 1996 to 2012
- Carol Brown (politician) (born 1963), Senator for Tasmania since 2005
- Gordon Brown (Australian politician) (1885–1967), Senator for Queensland from 1932 to 1965

== Members of the Canadian Senate ==
- Albert Joseph Brown (1861–1938), Senator for Wellington, Quebec from 1932 to 1938
- Bert Brown (1938–2018), Senator from Alberta from 2007 to 2013
- George Brown (Canadian politician) (1818–1880), Senator for Lambton, Ontario from 1873 to 1880

== Members of the Northern Irish Senate ==
- Percival Brown (1901–1962), Northern Irish Senator from 1953 to 1955

== Members of the United States Senate ==
- Albert G. Brown (1813–1880), U.S. Senator from Mississippi from 1854 to 1861
- Arthur Brown (U.S. senator) (1843–1906), U.S. Senator from Utah from 1896 to 1897
- Benjamin Gratz Brown (1826–1885), U.S. Senator from Missouri from 1863 to 1867
- Bedford Brown (1795–1870), U.S. Senator from North Carolina from 1829 to 1840
- Ernest S. Brown (1903–1965), U.S. Senator from Nevada in 1954
- Ethan Allen Brown (1776–1852), U.S. Senator from Ohio from 1822 to 1825
- Fred H. Brown (1879–1955), U.S. Senator from New Hampshire from 1933 to 1939
- Hank Brown (born 1940), U.S. Senator from Colorado from 1991 to 1997
- James Brown (Louisiana politician) (1766–1835), U.S. Senator from Louisiana from 1813 to 1817 and from 1819 to 1823
- John Brown (Kentucky politician, born 1757) (1757–1837), U.S. Senator from Kentucky from 1792 to 1805
- Joseph E. Brown (1821–1894), U.S. Senator from Georgia from 1880 to 1891
- Michael Donald Brown (born 1953), U.S. Shadow Senator from the District of Columbia since 2007
- Muriel Humphrey Brown (1912–1998), U.S. Senator from Minnesota in 1978
- Norris Brown (1863–1960), U.S. Senator from Nebraska from 1907 to 1913
- Prentiss M. Brown (1889–1973), U.S. Senator from Michigan from 1936 to 1943
- Scott Brown (politician) (born 1959), U.S. Senator from Massachusetts from 2010 to 2013
- Sherrod Brown (born 1952), U.S. Senator from Ohio from 2006 to 2025

== United States state senate members ==
=== Arizona State Senate ===
- Jack A. Brown (1929–2015)

=== Colorado State Senate ===
- George L. Brown (1926–2006)

=== Delaware State Senate ===
- Darius J. Brown (fl. 2010s)

=== Florida State Senate ===
- Tom Brown (Florida politician) (1933–2024)

=== Georgia State Senate ===
- Robert Brown (Georgia politician) (1950–2011)

=== Hawaii State Senate ===
- Kenneth Francis Brown (1919–2014)

=== Indiana State Senate ===
- Jason B. Brown (1839–1898)
- Liz Brown (politician) (fl. 2000s–2010s)

=== Kansas State Senate ===
- Napoleon Bonaparte Brown (1834–1910)

=== Louisiana State Senate ===
- Troy E. Brown (born 1971)

=== Maine State Senate ===
- Dwight A. Brown (1918–1990)

=== Maryland State Senate ===
- Elias Brown (1793–1857)
- John Brewer Brown (1836–1898)

=== Michigan State Senate ===
- Basil W. Brown (1927–1997)
- Cameron S. Brown (born 1954)
- Cora Brown (1914–1972)
- Garry E. Brown (1923–1998)
- Joseph A. Brown (1903–1963)

=== Minnesota State Senate ===
- Dave Brown (Minnesota politician) (born 1961)

=== Mississippi State Senate ===
- Terry W. Brown (1950–2014)

=== Missouri State Senate ===
- Dan W. Brown (1950–2021)

=== Montana State Senate ===
- Bob Brown (Montana politician) (born 1947)
- Roy Brown (Montana politician) (born 1951)
- Taylor Brown (Montana politician) (fl. 2000s–2010s)

=== Nebraska State Senate ===
- Pam Brown (Nebraska politician) (1952–2011)

=== Nevada State Senate ===
- Lori Lipman Brown (born 1958)

=== New Hampshire State Senate ===
- Titus Brown (1786–1849)
- Warren Brown (politician) (1836–1919)

=== New Jersey State Senate ===
- Chris A. Brown (born 1964)
- Leanna Brown (1935–2016)

=== New York State Senate ===
- Adon P. Brown (1873–1942)
- Byron Brown (born 1958)
- Elon R. Brown (1857–1922)
- Thomas C. Brown (1870–1952)
- Walter L. Brown (1846–1924)
- William L. Brown (politician) (1840–1906)

=== North Carolina State Senate ===
- Harry Brown (American politician) (born 1955)

=== Ohio State Senate ===
- Charles Elwood Brown (1834–1904)
- Edna Brown (born 1940)

=== Oklahoma State Senate ===
- Bill Brown (American politician) (born 1944)

=== Oregon State Senate ===
- Kate Brown (born 1960)
- Sam H. Brown (fl. 1930s)
- Samuel Brown (Oregon politician) (1821–1886)
- Walt Brown (politician) (born 1926)

=== Pennsylvania State Senate ===
- Charles Brown (congressman) (1797–1883)
- Robert Brown (Pennsylvania politician) (1744–1823)
- William M. Brown (Pennsylvania politician) (1850–1915)

=== South Carolina State Senate ===
- Edgar Allan Brown (1888–1975)

=== South Dakota State Senate ===
- Arnold M. Brown (born 1931)
- Corey Brown (politician) (born 1974)

=== Tennessee State Senate ===
- Aaron V. Brown (1795–1859)

=== Vermont State Senate ===
- Rufus E. Brown (1854–1920)

=== Washington State Senate ===
- Lisa Brown (Washington politician) (born 1956)
- Sharon Brown (Washington politician) (fl. 2010s)

=== Wisconsin State Senate ===
- Neal Brown (Wisconsin politician) (1861–1917)
- Orlando Brown (Wisconsin politician) (1828–1910)
- Ron Brown (Wisconsin politician) (born 1946)
- Taylor G. Brown (1890–1957)

== See also ==
- Angela Brown-Burke, Senate of Jamaica
- Ginny Brown-Waite (born 1943), Florida State Senate
- Senator Browne (disambiguation)
