= Edward Ward, 7th Viscount Bangor =

Peer, war correspondent, and author, (1905–1993)

Edward Ward
- Ward in 1927

7th Viscount Bangor
- In office 1950–1993

Personal details
- Born: 5 November 1905
- Died: 8 May 1993 (aged 87)
- Parents: Maxwell Ward, 6th Viscount Bangor (father); Agnes Elizabeth Hamilton (mother)
- Occupation: journalist and author

Edward Henry Harold Ward, 7th Viscount Bangor (5 November 1905 – 8 May 1993), was an Anglo-Irish peer, journalist, war correspondent, and author. He worked under the name Edward Ward.

== Early life ==
The son of Maxwell Ward, 6th Viscount Bangor, by his marriage to Agnes Elizabeth Hamilton, third daughter of Dacre Hamilton, of Cornacassa, County Monaghan, Ward was educated first at Wixenford, then, like his father, at Harrow and the Royal Military Academy, Woolwich. His grandmother was the scientific illustrator Mary Ward, who died in the world's first motoring accident.

== Career ==
Becoming a journalist, Ward went overseas as a Reuters correspondent for China and the Far East. In 1937, he was taken on by the BBC as a radio announcer, and in 1939 was sent as a BBC war correspondent to Finland to cover what became known as the Winter War. On 12 March 1940, Ward delivered a sensational international scoop, when BBC radio news carried his story of a ceasefire agreed between the Soviet Union and Finland, a day before it was formally announced. Ward was then deployed to Belgium and France, just before the Phoney War ended in Blitzkrieg. He escaped from the German advance by taking a ship from Bordeaux to Egypt, where the BBC used him to take the place of another correspondent, Richard Dimbleby. He reported from Athens on the May 1941 evacuation of the city. In November 1941, he was taken prisoner by Italian forces at Tobruk following the Battle of Sidi Rezegh. He spent the rest of the Second World War as a prisoner of war in Italian and later German camps. On 31 March 1945, he was among those liberated by American forces from Oflag XII-B, a camp for officers in Hadamar near Limburg an der Lahn.

After the war, Ward worked as a foreign correspondent around the world until 1960. He reported from Hungary during the 1956 uprising.

After making a Christmas broadcast from Bishop Rock Lighthouse, he was marooned there for a month by rough seas.

He appeared as a castaway on the BBC Radio programme Desert Island Discs on 28 August 1961. He published several books, including three volumes of autobiography.

Bangor's obituary in The Independent called him "one of the very best of the BBC's war correspondents".

== Private life ==
In 1933, Ward married firstly Elizabeth Balfour, of Wrockwardine Hall, Wellington, Shropshire; she divorced him in 1937. The same year, he married secondly Mary Kathleen Middleton, of Shanghai; this marriage ended in divorce in 1947. That same year, he married thirdly Leila Mary Heaton, with whom he had one son, William Maxwell David Ward, before his third divorce in 1951. In 1951, he married lastly Marjorie Alice Simpson, formerly Banks (1915-1991), with whom he had a second son Edward and a daughter Sarah.

In 1950, he succeeded his father as Viscount Bangor, a title in the peerage of Ireland.

In 1991, his fourth wife committed suicide.

At the time of his death on 8 May 1993, Lord Bangor's address was 59, Cadogan Square, London SW1; and he was a member of the Savile and Garrick clubs.

== Books ==
- Despatches from Finland: January–April 1940 (London: John Lane, 1940)
- Give Me Air (London: John Lane, 1946), about being a prisoner of war
- Chinese Crackers (London: John Lane the Bodley Head, 1947)
- Europe on Record (London: Wingate, 1950), with Marjorie Ward
- The US and Us (1951), with Marjorie Ward
- Danger is Their Business (London: Cassell, 1955), with Marjorie Ward
- The New Eldorado: Venezuela (London: Hale, 1957)
- Oil is Where They Find It (London: Harrap, 1959)
- Sahara Story (New York: Norton, 1962)
- Number One Boy (London: Michael Joseph, 1969)
- I've Lived like a Lord (London: Michael Joseph, 1970)

Peerage of Ireland
Preceded by Maxwell Ward	Viscount Bangor; 1950–1993	Succeeded by William Maxwell David Ward
