= Senator Fleming =

Senator Fleming may refer to:

- George Fleming (American football) (1938–2021), Washington State Senate
- Henry Fleming (Northern Ireland politician) (1871/1872–1956), Senate of Northern Ireland
- Robert D. Fleming (1903–1994), Pennsylvania State Senate
- William Fleming (governor) (1729–1795), Virginia State Senate
- Wilmot Fleming (1916–1978), Pennsylvania State Senate
