= William George Turner =

Politician (1872–1937)

Sir William George Turner (1872 – 14 June 1937) was an American-born unionist politician in Northern Ireland, who served as Lord Mayor of Belfast for over five years.

== Life ==
Born in United States, Turner became a fruiterer on the Shankill Road.

He first stood for election to Belfast Corporation in the Cliftonville ward in 1909. Although he was officially an independent Unionist, he had the backing of the local Conservative Party. However, he was defeated by the footballer William Kennedy Gibson. Turner was later successful as an Ulster Unionist Party candidate for the city council. He served as Lord Mayor of Belfast from 1923 to 1928; his mayoralty also made him an ex-officio member of the Senate of Northern Ireland.

He was knighted in 1924, while in 1927 he was appointed to the Privy Council of Northern Ireland.

== Arms ==
Coat of arms of William George Turner

Notes
Granted 8 August 1929 by Sir Nevile Rodwell Wilkinson, Ulster King of Arms.
Crest
A lion rampant of the field charged with a bell Or.
Escutcheon
Gules on a pale Argent a dexter hand appaume couped at the wrist between two pomegranates Proper on a chief Ermine a bell Or.
Motto
Diligentia Cresco

Civic offices
Preceded by Samuel Mercier	High Sheriff of Belfast; 1920 – 1921	Succeeded by Joseph Davison
Preceded by William Coates	Lord Mayor of Belfast; 1923–1928	Succeeded by William Coates
