= Robert Dorman =

Irish socialist activist (1859-1937)

Robert Dorman (1859 in Dublin – August 1937) was an Irish socialist activist.

He served with the Royal Navy in British Columbia and with the Young Men's Christian Association, later working in insurance. Around 1885, he was living in Derry and was already regarded as one of the most prominent socialists in the city. During the mid-1890s, almost alone, he revived outdoor meetings in Dublin.

On May Day 1894 Robert Dorman and others including William Field, J. E. Kenny and Alexander Blane, spoke from the platform at the Dublin labour demonstration in Phoenix Park Dublin. Dorman proposed a long resolution which demanded manhood suffrage; the eight-hour day; promotion of trade unionism; assimilation of the borough and parliamentary franchise; labour representation in parliament and on local boards; and payment of MPs by the state. Dorman, in calling for an eight-hour day, stressed the educative and ethical value of such a reform:

It gave the worker time for recreation, time for educating himself, and getting a knowledge of the world and the things that were taking place about him; and not only that but it gave the workingman who was the father of a family an opportunity for performing the duties of his position as a parent required of him.

Dorman had 13 children by two different wives, all of whom lived into adulthood.

Dorman announced the formation of the Irish section of the Independent Labour Party in November 1894, at an open aired meeting in Dublin in which he spoke alongside Keir Hardie. He later moved back to Dublin and there, he co-signed the letter which invited James Connolly to become the organiser of the Dublin Socialist Society.

Dorman seconded the proposal to re-form the Dublin Socialist Club as the Irish Socialist Republican Party (ISRP), and spoke alongside Connolly at the party's official launch, on the Dublin Custom House steps. He moved to Limerick later in the year, but was unable to establish a branch of the party there, and resigned from the ISRP in June 1897.

Dorman remained a Christian socialist, and continued to give public speeches when he moved to Belfast in 1912. He was a Quaker and was accepted into the Society of Friends in 1901. When the Belfast Labour Party was established, he became active in it and when, in 1924, it was reconstituted as the Northern Ireland Labour Party (NILP), he was elected as its first vice-president. Later in the year, he stood to succeed Joseph Davison as alderman for the Court ward on the Belfast Corporation, but he was defeated by independent Unionist John William Nixon. The Manchester Guardian reported that several women supporting Nixon were arrested on the day of the election, on charges of personation.

In 1925, Dorman was elected as the first NILP member of the Senate of Northern Ireland. He served until 1933, when he lost his seat due to the reduced number of NILP members in the Commons. He stood again in 1935, following the death of George Clark, but was defeated by the Ulster Unionist Party candidate William Gibson by 35 votes to 5.

Dorman was regarded as an expert on Irish literature of the nineteenth century, and was also known as an advocate of temperance. During the 1930s, he campaigned for the reunification of Ireland, and supported Nationalist Party candidates in several elections. Dorman visited Liverpool in mid-1937 to attend the funeral of his brother, but he died suddenly, while addressing a religious meeting, and was buried alongside him.
