= Thomas McLaughlin =

Thomas McLaughlin may refer to:

- Thomas McLaughlin (politician) (1878–1944), Irish nationalist politician
- Thomas H. McLaughlin (1881–1947), American prelate of the Roman Catholic Church
- Thomas D. McLaughlin (1882–?), American architect
- Thomas M. McLaughlin (1947–2010), American pilot and face of the Time person of the year 1966 representing the baby boomer generation
- Thomas McLaughlin (engineer) (1896–1971), designer of the Ardnacrusha hydro-electric scheme in Ireland

== See also ==
- Tom McLaughlin (disambiguation)
