= Senator Duff (disambiguation) =

James H. Duff (1883–1969) was a U.S. Senator from Pennsylvania from 1951 to 1957. Senator Duff may also refer to:

- Bob Duff (born 1971), Connecticut State Senate
- Hugh Duff (politician) (1870/71–1940), Senate of Northern Ireland
- Philip S. Duff (1922–1997), Minnesota State Senate
- Scott Duff (1950–2020), Oregon State Senate

== See also ==
- Senator Duffy (disambiguation)
- Senator Duffield (disambiguation)
