= Senator Boyd =

Senator Boyd may refer to:

- Betty Boyd (Colorado legislator) (born 1943), Colorado State Senate
- Elisha Boyd (1769–1841), Virginia State Senate
- Jim Boyd (politician) (born 1956), Florida State Senate
- John Boyd (Connecticut politician) (1799–1881), Connecticut State Senate
- John W. Boyd (Wisconsin politician) (1811–1892), Wisconsin State Senate
- Justin Boyd (politician) (fl. 2010s–2020s), Arkansas State Senate
- Marion Speed Boyd (1900–1988), Tennessee State Senate
- Nicole Akins Boyd (born 1969), Mississippi State Senate
- Samuel Boyd (Northern Ireland politician) (1886/1887–?), Northern Irish Senate
- Thomas A. Boyd (1830–1897), Illinois State Senate
