= Henry Fleming =

Henry Fleming may refer to:

== Politicians ==
- Henry Fleming (MP) (1663–1713), English politician, Member of Parliament (MP) for St Germans 1690–1698 and 1700–1708
- Henry Fleming (Northern Ireland politician) (1870s–1956), member of the Senate of Northern Ireland

== Fictional characters ==
- Henry Fleming, main character in the novel The Red Badge of Courage (1895), by Stephen Crane
- Henry Fleming, character in ...And Justice for All (film)

== See also ==
- Harry Raymond Fleming, physician and politician
