= John Barnhill =

John Barnhill may refer to:

- John Barnhill (American football) (1903–1973), American football coach, college athletics administrator
- John Barnhill (basketball) (1938–2013), NBA and ABA player
- John Barnhill (politician) (1905–1971), assassinated Ulster Unionist Party member of the Senate of Northern Ireland

== See also ==
- John Barnhill Dickie (1829–1886), Canadian farmer, teacher and politician
