= Senator McCormick (disambiguation) =

Dave McCormick (born 1965) is a U.S. Senator from Pennsylvania.

Senator McCormick may also refer to:

- Medill McCormick (1877–1925), U.S. Senator from Illinois
- Dale McCormick (born 1947), Maine State Senate
- Earle McCormick, Maine State Senate
- George M. McCormick (1841–1913), Illinois State Senate
- James R. McCormick (1824–1897), Missouri State Senate
- John McCormick (British politician) (1887/1888–1958), Northern Irish Senate

== See also ==
- Senator McCormack (disambiguation)
