= Senator Barclay =

Senator Barclay may refer to:

- H. Douglas Barclay (born 1932), New York State Senate
- John Barclay (mayor) (1749–1824), Pennsylvania State Senate
- William Barclay (Northern Ireland politician) (1873/1874–1945), Northern Irish Senate

== See also ==
- Senator Barkley (disambiguation)
