= Senator McConnell (disambiguation) =

Mitch McConnell (born February 20, 1942) is an American politician. Senator McConnell may also refer to:

== Members of the Northern Irish Senate ==
- Alexander McConnell (1915–?), Northern Irish Senator from 1956 to 1961

== Members of the United States Senate ==
- William J. McConnell (1839–1925), U.S. Senator from Idaho from 1890 to 1891

== United States state senate members ==
- Felix Grundy McConnell (1809–1846), Alabama State Senate
- Glenn F. McConnell (born 1947), South Carolina State Senate

== See also ==
- Rose McConnell Long (1892–1970), U.S. Senator from Louisiana from 1936 to 1937
