= Kennedy Stewart =

Kennedy Stewart may refer to:

- Kennedy Stewart (Canadian politician) (born 1966), Canadian politician and academic
- Kennedy Stewart (Irish politician) (born 1882 or 1883), unionist politician in Northern Ireland

== See also ==
- Stewart Kennedy (born 1949), Scottish footballer
