= Hugh Duff =

Hugh Duff may refer to:

- Hugh Duff (politician)
- Hugh Duff (bowls)
