= Senator McClelland =

Senator McClelland may refer to:

- Charles P. McClelland (1854–1944), New York State Senate
- David McClelland (politician), Northern Irish Senate
- James D. McClelland (1848–1919), New York State Senate

== See also ==
- Senator McClellan (disambiguation)
