= Martin Kelso Wallace =

Politician from Northern Ireland

Sir Martin Kelso Wallace (3 May 1898 – 12 February 1978) was a Unionist politician in Northern Ireland.

Wallace attended Methodist College Belfast and served in the RNVR during the First World War. He worked as a company director and was elected as an Ulster Unionist Party member of the Belfast Corporation. He was elected as Lord Mayor of Belfast in 1961 and served for two years. He became a Knight Bachelor in 1963. His mayoralty made him an ex-officio member of the Senate of Northern Ireland.

Civic offices
Preceded by Florence Breakie	High Sheriff of Belfast; 1959–1960	Succeeded by William Duncan Geddis
Preceded by Robin Kinahan	Lord Mayor of Belfast; 1961–1963	Succeeded by William Jenkins
