= Senator Duffy (disambiguation) =

F. Ryan Duffy (1888–1979) was a U.S. Senator from Wisconsin from 1933 to 1939. Senator Duffy may also refer to:

- Dan Duffy (born 1966), Illinois State Senate
- Francis Clyde Duffy (1890–1977), North Dakota State Senate
- Thomas A. Duffy (1906–1979), New York State Senate

== See also ==
- Senator Duff (disambiguation)
- Senator Duffield (disambiguation)
