= Senator McClellan (disambiguation) =

John L. McClellan (1896–1977) was a U.S. Senator from Arkansas from 1943 to 1977.

Senator McClellan may also refer to:

- Abraham McClellan (Tennessee politician) (1789–1866), Tennessee State Senate
- Jennifer McClellan (born 1972), Virginia State Senate
- Robert H. McClellan (1823–1902), New York State Senate
- Robert L. McClellan (1822–1889), Pennsylvania State Senate
- Samuel R. McClellan (1806–1890), Wisconsin State Senate

== See also ==
- Senator McClelland (disambiguation)
