= Senator McCormack =

Senator McCormack may refer to:

- John W. McCormack (1891–1980), Massachusetts State Senate
- Mike McCormack (politician) (1921–2020), Washington State Senate
- Peter M. McCormack (1919–1988), Massachusetts State Senate
- Richard McCormack (politician) (born 1947), Vermont State Senate
- Thomas McCormack (California politician) (1873–1949), California State Senate
- Thomas J. McCormack (1922–1998), Pennsylvania State Senate
- Tim McCormack (born c. 1944), Ohio State Senate

== See also ==
- Senator McCormick (disambiguation)
