= Adam Duffin =

Northern Irish unionist politician

Adam Duffin (1841–1924) was a unionist politician in Ireland.

Duffin studied at the Royal School, Armagh, and Queen's College. Despite having no political experience, he was elected as an Ulster Unionist Party member of the Senate of Northern Ireland, aged about 80, in 1921. He served until his death two years and nine months later. His daughter, Emma, was a wartime nurse whose diaries are now held with the larger Duffin collection in the Public Record Office of Northern Ireland.
