= William Moore Wallis Clark =

Politician from Northern Ireland

William Moore Wallis Clark (10 January 1897 – 1 May 1971) was an Ulster Unionist member of the Senate of Northern Ireland from 1946 until 1961. He was Deputy Leader of the Senate and Parliamentary Secretary in the Department of the Prime Minister from 1948 to 1960.

Political offices
Preceded by Sir Joseph Davison	Deputy Leader of the Senate of Northern Ireland; 1948–1960	Succeeded by Daniel McGladdery
Preceded by Sir Joseph Davison	Parliamentary Secretary, Department of the Prime Minister (Northern Ireland); 1948–1960	Succeeded by Daniel McGladdery
