= Samuel Kinghan =

Politician in Northern Ireland

Senate of Northern Ireland Member
- In office 1963-1973

Deputy Speaker of the Senate of Northern Ireland
- In office 1965-1967; 1971-1972

Personal details
- Born: c. 1898
- Died: 1975
- Political party: Ulster Unionist

Samuel Kinghan OBE (c.1898 – 1975) was a unionist politician in Northern Ireland.

Kinghan worked at Gallagher's Tobacco. He became active in the Ulster Unionist Party and was elected to the Senate of Northern Ireland in 1963, serving until its abolition in 1973. From 1965 to 1967, and again from 1971 to 1972, he was a Deputy Speaker of the Senate.

Kinghan died in 1975 at the age of 77.
