= Senator Duffield =

Senator Duffield may refer to:

- William E. Duffield (1922–2001), Pennsylvania State Senate
- William Ward Duffield (1823–1907), Michigan State Senate

== See also ==
- Senator Duff (disambiguation)
- Senator Duffy (disambiguation)
