= Robert Harcourt (unionist politician) =

Northern Irish unionist politician

Lord Mayor of Belfast
- In office 1955–1957
- Preceded by: Percival Brown
- Succeeded by: Cecil McKee

High Sheriff of Belfast
- In office 1948–1949
- Preceded by: James Henry Norritt
- Succeeded by: Stuart Knox Henry

Member of the Northern Ireland Senate
- In office 1955–1957

Member of the Northern Ireland Parliament for Belfast Woodvale
- In office 4 April 1950 – 15 November 1955
- Preceded by: John William Nixon
- Succeeded by: Neville Martin

Personal details
- Born: 1902; Belfast, Northern Ireland
- Died: 25 August 1969
- Political party: Ulster Unionist

Sir Robert John Rolston Harcourt, JP (1902 – 25 August 1969) was a Northern Irish unionist politician.

== Background ==
Robert Harcourt, known as John, became the director of F. E. Harcourt and Company coal merchants. He was High Sheriff of Belfast in 1949, and later in the year unsuccessfully stood as the Ulster Unionist Party (UUP) candidate for South Down. Soon after this, John William Nixon, the independent Unionist MP for Belfast Woodvale, died. Harcourt stood in the ensuing by-election on 4 April 1950 and was elected.

In 1955, Harcourt was elected Lord Mayor of Belfast, a position which carried with it an ex officio position in the Senate of Northern Ireland. He served until 1957, when he was knighted.

Harcourt was an active member of the Orange Order and a Member of the prestigious Belfast lodge, Royal York LOL 145.

Parliament of Northern Ireland
| Preceded by John William Nixon | Member of Parliament for Belfast Woodvale; 1949–1955 | Succeeded by Neville Martin |
Civic offices
| Preceded by James Henry Norritt | High Sheriff of Belfast; 1949–1950 | Succeeded by Stuart Knox Henry |
| Preceded by Percival Brown | Lord Mayor of Belfast; 1955–1957 | Succeeded by Cecil McKee |
