= Edward Ward, 4th Viscount Bangor =

Irish peer and politician (1827–1881)

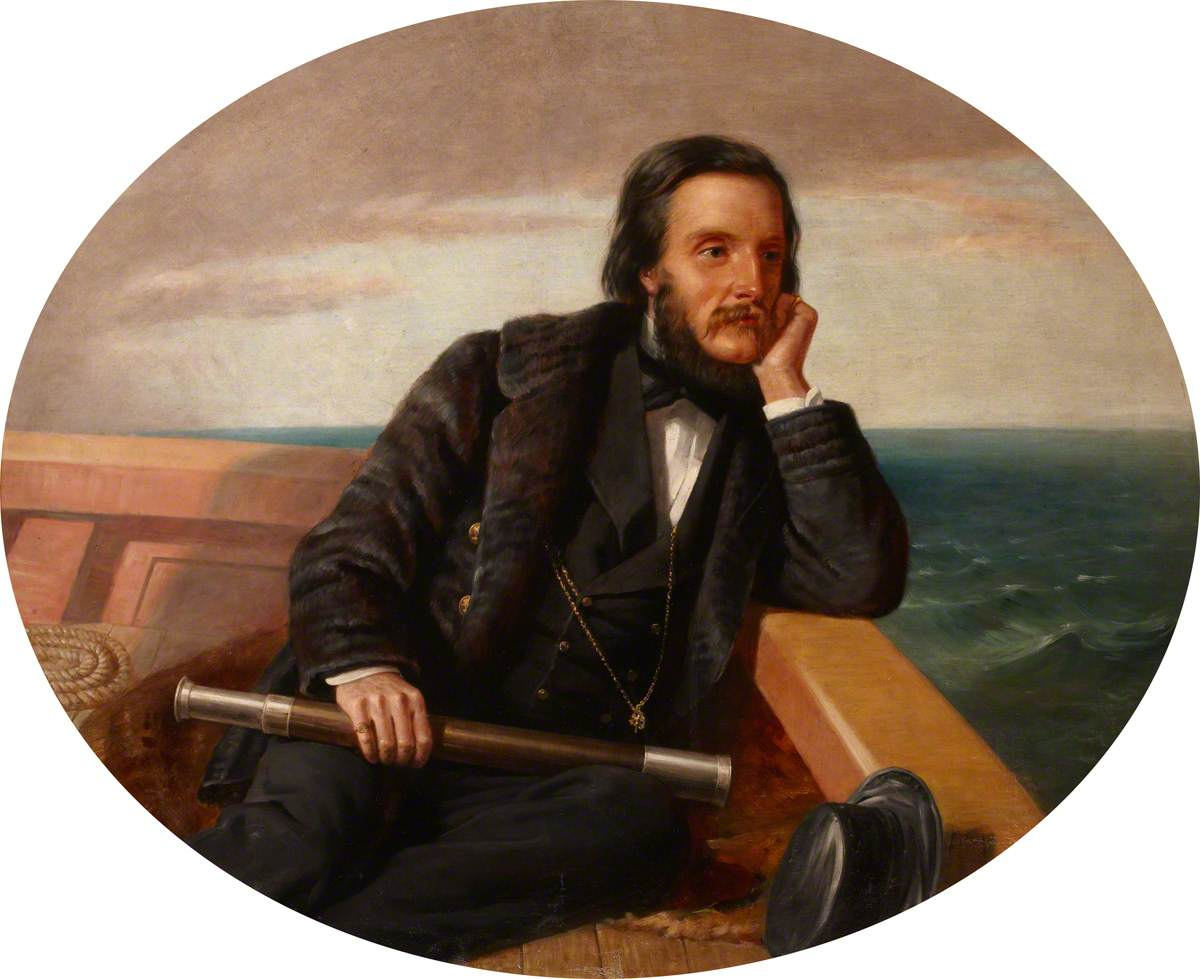
Edward Ward (1827–1881), 4th Viscount Bangor, on a Yach, painting by Edwin Long, c.1850.

Edward Ward, 4th Viscount Bangor DL (23 February 1827 – 14 September 1881), styled The Honourable from September 1827 until 1837, was an Irish peer and Conservative politician.

Born in London, he was the son of Edward Ward, 3rd Viscount Bangor and his wife Harriet Margaret Maxwell, second daughter of Henry Maxwell, 6th Baron Farnham. In 1837, aged only ten, Ward succeeded his father as viscount. He was educated at Eton College and went then to Trinity College, Cambridge. He served as Deputy Lieutenant for County Down and in 1855, Ward was elected an Irish representative peer to the House of Lords. Ward died at Brighton, unmarried but was rumoured to have had an out-of-wedlock son born in 1856 named Edward Terry Ward. He was succeeded in the viscountcy by his younger brother Henry.

Peerage of Ireland
Preceded by Edward Southwell Ward	Viscount Bangor; 1837–1881	Succeeded by Henry Ward
Political offices
Preceded by The Lord Dunalley	Representative peer for Ireland; 1855–1881	Succeeded by The Earl of Kilmorey
