= William Gibson (Ulster Unionist Party politician) =

Politician from Northern Ireland

Member of the Senate of Northern Ireland
- In office 1935-1942

Personal details
- Born: 1859 or 1860
- Party: Ulster Unionist
- Education: Royal University of Ireland
- Military career
- Branch: Ulster Volunteers
- Rank: Commander
- Unit: 3rd East Belfast Regiment

William Gibson (born 1859 or 1860) was a unionist politician in Northern Ireland.

Gibson studied at the Royal University of Ireland before becoming a general practitioner. He was elected to local posts in Belfast; for example, becoming a Poor Law Guardian for Ballymacarrett in 1895. He was the first commander of the 3rd East Belfast Regiment of the Ulster Volunteers, and in the early 1910s served as Honorary Secretary of the Ulster Unionist Council.

Following the death of George Clark in 1935, Gibson was selected as the Ulster Unionist Party candidate for the Senate of Northern Ireland, and he defeated Robert Dorman, his Northern Ireland Labour Party opponent, by 35 votes to 5. He was appointed as a Deputy Speaker in 1941, but resigned from the Senate the following year.
