= John Clements Glendinning =

Unionist politician in Northern Ireland

John Clements Glendinning (1866 – 1949) was a unionist politician in Northern Ireland.

Glendinning was a newspaper proprietor and served in various public posts for the Ulster Unionist Party. He was elected to the Senate of Northern Ireland in 1922, serving until 1933. He was re-elected to the Senate the following year, and served until 1946.
