= James Norritt =

Northern Irish businessman and mayor

Sir James Henry Norritt JP DL FCIS (1887 – 21 July 1963) was a Northern Irish businessman who was Lord Mayor of Belfast for the Ulster Unionist Party from 1951 to 1953. His mayoralty made him an ex-officio member of the Senate of Northern Ireland.

Norritt was born in Belfast in 1887, the son of James Norritt and Elizabeth Best. He began his career in the Belfast shipbuilders Harland & Wolff, working his way to an executive position. From 1930 to 1962, he worked for the beverage company Cantrell and Cochrane before retiring. He was knighted in the 1953 Coronation Honours List.

Civic offices
| Preceded by W. E. G. Johnston | High Sheriff of Belfast; 1948–1949 | Succeeded by Robert Harcourt |
| Preceded by W. E. G. Johnston | Lord Mayor of Belfast; 1951–1953 | Succeeded by Percival Brown |
