= John Andrew Long =

John Andrew Long (1869–1941) was a unionist politician in Northern Ireland.

Long worked as a farmer and served on various public boards before his election as an Ulster Unionist member of the Senate of Northern Ireland in 1921, serving until his death in 1941. He was Deputy Leader of the Senate and Parliamentary Secretary in the Department of the Prime Minister from 1930 to 1941.

Political offices
Preceded by 6th Viscount Bangor	Deputy Leader of the Senate of Northern Ireland; 1930–1941	Succeeded by Sir Joseph Davison
Preceded by 6th Viscount Bangor	Parliamentary Secretary, Department of the Prime Minister (Northern Ireland); 1930–1941	Succeeded by Sir Joseph Davison
