= Alexander Gordon (Northern Ireland politician) =

Northern Irish soldier and politician (1882–1967)

Lieutenant-Colonel Sir Alexander Robert Gisborne Gordon GBE DSO PC (NI) (28 July 1882 – 23 April 1967) was a Unionist Member and Senator in the Parliament of Northern Ireland.

== Family background ==
Sir Alexander was born in County Down on 28 July 1882, the son of Ada Austen Eyre and Alexander Hamilton Miller Haven Gordon, DL of Florida Manor, Killinchy and Delamont, Killyleagh. Florida Manor, a late 17th-century estate, described by Sir Charles Brett as a "rather mysterious house", came to the Gordons by the marriage, in 1755, of Robert Gordon to Alice Arbuckle, heiress to the Crawfords of Crawfordsburn. The Gordons were hitherto wine and spirit merchants but the progeny of this marriage, David, established Gordon and Company bankers, later to become Belfast Banking Company. David Gordon went on to marry a cousin of his mother's – Mary Crawford, of Crawfordsburn – in 1789.

Florida Manor was sold in 1910. Sir Alexander inherited Delamont from his father. During his residence there his main legacy to the house was to demolish the redundant servants' wing.

== Career ==
Sir Alexander was educated at Rugby School and the Royal Military College, Sandhurst. He was seriously wounded whilst serving with the Royal Irish Regiment during the First World War, but continued as a soldier until 1942.

From 1929 to 1949, he was the Unionist member for East Down at Stormont. During this period he served as government Chief Whip. He was also Parliamentary and Financial Secretary to the Ministry of Finance from 1937. On 13 June 1940, however, he resigned this position as a result of, as he put it, the Northern Irish government being "quite unfitted to sustain the people in the ordeal [the Belfast Blitz] we have to face." In 1950, Sir Alexander entered the upper House as a Senator, from 1951 to 1961 he was Leader of the Senate and from 1961 to 1964 he was Speaker of that house. He resigned this seat in 1964.

He was invested as a Knight Grand Cross, the most senior grade in the Order of the British Empire, ranking below a baronet in the order of precedence.

== Legacy ==
Gordon and his wife had no children. On his death, in 1967, the estate of Delamont was held on trust by Gordon's great-nephew Archibald Arundel Pugh (changed to Gordon-Pugh by deed poll in 1968). He sold the estate in 1985 to Belfast Education and Library Board. Archibald Gordon-Pugh died in 1995; his son, Archie Gordon-Pugh, died at Saintfield in December 2010.

Parliament of Northern Ireland
New constituency	Member of Parliament for East Down; 1929–1949	Succeeded by Brian Faulkner
Political offices
Preceded by Milne Barbour	Parliamentary and Financial Secretary, Ministry of Finance; 1937–1940	Vacant Title next held by Maynard Sinclair
Preceded by Roland Nugent	Speaker of the Senate of Northern Ireland; 1961–1964	Succeeded by 2nd Baron Glentoran
