= Senator Stuart (disambiguation) =

Charles E. Stuart (1810–1887) was a U.S. Senator from Michigan from 1853 to 1859. Senator Stuart may also refer to:

- Alexander Hugh Holmes Stuart (1807–1891), Virginia State Senate
- Archibald Stuart (1795–1855), Virginia State Senate
- Eugene P. Stuart (1927–2002), Kentucky State Senate
- George L. Stuart Jr. (fl. 1970s–1990s), Florida State Senate
- Harry Carter Stuart (1893–1963), Virginia State Senate
- John T. Stuart (1807–1885), Illinois State Senate
- Michael B. Stuart (fl. 2010s–2010s), West Virginia State Senate
- Richard Stuart (born 1964), Virginia State Senate
- William Corwin Stuart (1920–2010), Iowa State Senate

== See also ==
- Senator Stewart (disambiguation)
