= Belfast Woodvale (Northern Ireland Parliament constituency) =

Constituency of the Parliament of Northern Ireland

Coordinates: 54.610°N 5.963°W

- Former Borough constituency for the Parliament of Northern Ireland
- Belfast shown within Northern Ireland

Former constituency
- Created: 1929
- Abolished: 1973
- Election method: First past the post

Belfast Woodvale was a constituency of the Parliament of Northern Ireland.

== Boundaries ==
Belfast Woodvale was a borough constituency comprising part of western Belfast. It was created in 1929, when the House of Commons (Method of Voting and Redistribution of Seats) Act (Northern Ireland) 1929 introduced first past the post elections throughout Northern Ireland.

Belfast Woodvale was created by the division of Belfast West into four new constituencies. It survived unchanged, returning one member of Parliament, until the Parliament of Northern Ireland was temporarily suspended in 1972, and then formally abolished in 1973.

== Politics ==
The seat was strongly Unionist, but there was a strong local labour movement, and for much of its history, the seat was held by the Northern Ireland Labour Party or independent Unionists.

== Members of Parliament ==
Election	Member	Party
1929	John William Nixon	Independent Unionist
1950(b)	Robert Harcourt	Ulster Unionist
1955(b)	Neville Martin	Ulster Unionist
1958	Billy Boyd	Northern Ireland Labour Party
1965	John McQuade	Ulster Unionist Party
1970	John McQuade	Independent Unionist
1971	John McQuade	Democratic Unionist Party
1973	constituency abolished	

== Election results ==
General Election 1929: Belfast Woodvale
Party	Candidate	Votes	%	±%
Ind. Unionist	John William Nixon	9,904	58.4	
UUP	William Beattie	6,465	41.6	
Majority		3,439	16.8	
Turnout		16,369	75.2	
Ind. Unionist win (new seat)				

General Election 1933: Belfast Woodvale
Party	Candidate	Votes	%	±%
Ind. Unionist	John William Nixon	8,709	56.6	−1.8
UUP	Alexander Dalzell	6,676	43.4	+1.8
Majority		2,033	13.2	−13.6
Turnout		15,385	76.4	+0.8
Ind. Unionist hold		Swing		

General Election 1938: Belfast Woodvale
Party	Candidate	Votes	%	±%
Ind. Unionist	John William Nixon	9,335	59.0	+2.4
UUP	John William Dickson	6,479	41.0	−2.4
Majority		2,856	18.0	+4.8
Turnout		15,814	79.5	+3.1
Ind. Unionist hold		Swing		

General Election 1945: Belfast Woodvale
Party	Candidate	Votes	%	±%
Ind. Unionist	John William Nixon	9,274	66.4	+7.4
UUP	Samuel Lyness Megraw	4,686	33.6	−7.4
Majority		4,588	32.8	+14.8
Turnout		13,960	69.3	−10.2
Ind. Unionist hold		Swing		

At the 1949 Northern Ireland general election, John William Nixon was elected unopposed.

1950 Belfast Woodvale by-election
Party	Candidate	Votes	%	±%
UUP	Robert Harcourt	3,939	33.1	N/A
Ind. Unionist	Robert Hill	3,529	29.7	N/A
NI Labour	Charles Hull	2,893	29.7	New
Ind. Unionist	David H. Walker	1,533	12.9	N/A
Majority		410	3.4	N/A
Turnout		11,894	57.9	N/A
UUP gain from Ind. Unionist		Swing	N/A	

General Election 1953: Belfast Woodvale
Party	Candidate	Votes	%	±%
UUP	Robert Harcourt	6,085	40.1	N/A
Ind. Unionist	James Brennan Docherty	5,786	38.2	N/A
NI Labour	Billy Boyd	3,286	21.7	N/A
Majority		299	1.9	N/A
Turnout		15,157	69.3	N/A
UUP gain from Ind. Unionist		Swing	N/A	

1955 Belfast Woodvale by-election
Party	Candidate	Votes	%	±%
UUP	Neville Martin	5,609	52.0	+11.9
NI Labour	Billy Boyd	5,173	48.0	+26.3
Majority		436	4.0	+2.1
Turnout		10,782	50.0	−19.3
UUP hold		Swing		

General Election 1958: Belfast Woodvale
Party	Candidate	Votes	%	±%
NI Labour	Billy Boyd	7,529	50.3	+28.6
UUP	Neville Martin	7,449	49.7	+9.6
Majority		80	0.6	N/A
Turnout		14,978	71.8	+2.5
NI Labour gain from UUP		Swing		

General Election 1962: Belfast Woodvale
Party	Candidate	Votes	%	±%
NI Labour	Billy Boyd	8,389	57.4	+7.1
UUP	James Frazer Kerr	6,232	42.6	−7.1
Majority		2,157	14.8	+14.2
Turnout		14,621	71.9	+0.1
NI Labour hold		Swing		

General Election 1965: Belfast Woodvale
Party	Candidate	Votes	%	±%
UUP	John McQuade	6,791	57.3	+14.7
NI Labour	Billy Boyd	5,067	42.7	−14.7
Majority		1,724	14.6	N/A
Turnout		11,858	57.3	−14.6
UUP gain from NI Labour		Swing		

General Election 1969: Belfast Woodvale
Party	Candidate	Votes	%	±%
UUP	John McQuade	7,209	50.7	−6.6
NI Labour	Billy Boyd	3,878	26.9	−15.8
Ind. Unionist	Leslie Bell	3,231	22.4	New
Majority		3,331	23.8	+9.2
Turnout		14,318	71.6	+14.3
UUP hold		Swing		
