= Tom McLaughlin =

Tom McLaughlin may refer to:

- Tom McLaughlin (baseball) (1860–1921), Major League Baseball infielder
- Tom McLaughlin (basketball), American sports agent and basketball coach
- Tom McLaughlin (soccer) (born 1976), retired American soccer forward

== See also ==
- Thomas McLaughlin (disambiguation)
- Tom McLachlan (1912–1986), Australian rugby league footballer
- Tom McLoughlin (born 1950), American screenwriter, film/television director
