= 1967 Belfast Corporation election =

Elections to the Belfast Corporation were held on 17 May 1967. The elections saw the Ulster Unionist Party win an increased majority.

== Results ==
The Ulster Unionist Party (UUP) stood 53 candidates, of whom 44 were elected, a gain of 5 seats. These mostly came at the expense of the Northern Ireland Labour Party, which was reduced to only two seats. The Republican Labour Party made gains, including taking all three seats in Dock ward, defeating independent unionists, who had been suspended from the UUP.

Eileen Paisley gained a seat for the Protestant Unionist Party, but James McCarroll lost his seat. The National Democratic Party stood 9 candidates, but failed to win any seats, surviving on the council only through an alderman. Tommy Henderson, the longest serving member of the council, was returned unopposed as an independent unionist. However, Cecil McKee, the former UUP Lord Mayor of Belfast, suffered a surprise defeat, also standing as an independent unionist.

Belfast Corporation election, 1967
Party	Seats	Gains	Losses	Net gain/loss	Seats %	Votes %	Votes	+/−
UUP	44	5	0	+5				
Republican Labour	8	3	0	+3				
NI Labour	2	0	4	-4				
Protestant Unionist	2	1	1	0				
National Democratic	1	0	0	0				
Independent	1	0	0	0				
Independent Labour	1	0	5	-5				
Ind. Unionist	1	0	0	0				
