= George Whaley (politician) =

Northern Irish politician

- Born: 1860
- Occupation: Politician

George Whaley (born 1860 or 1861) was a unionist politician in Northern Ireland.

Whaley worked as a baker. He was active in the Ulster Unionist Party, and was elected to the Senate of Northern Ireland in 1940, at the age of eighty, serving for five years.
