= Sir William Coates, 1st Baronet =

Irish stockbroker and politician

Sir William Coates Bt DL JP
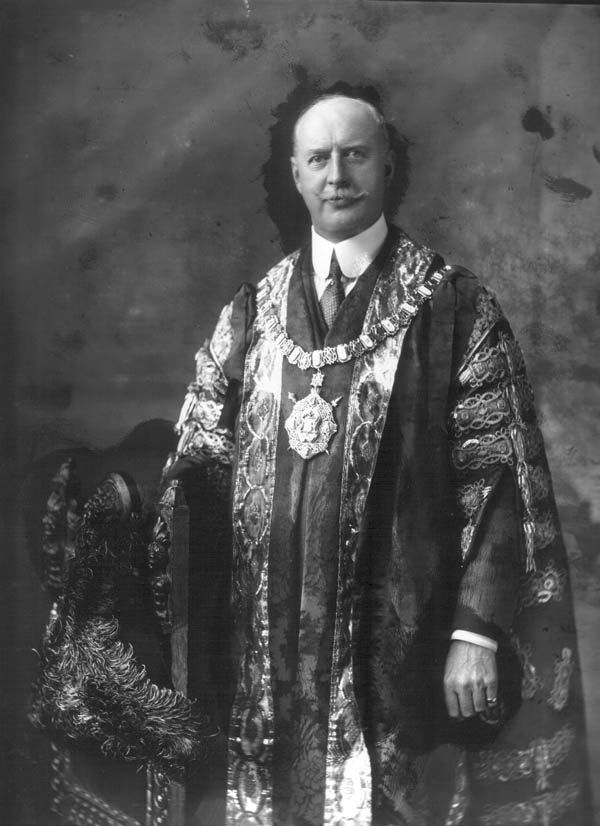
- Photographed as Lord Mayor of Belfast, 7 January 1921

Lord Mayor of Belfast
- In office 1929–1931
- Preceded by: William George Turner
- Succeeded by: Crawford McCullagh
- In office 1920–1923
- Preceded by: John C. White
- Succeeded by: William George Turner

High Sheriff of Belfast
- In office 1906–1907
- Preceded by: Henry O'Neill
- Succeeded by: Peter O'Connell

Personal details
- Born: William Frederick Coates; 1866; Belfast, Ireland
- Died: 19 January 1932 (aged 65–66)
- Spouse: Elsie Millicent Gregory
- Education: Royal Belfast Academical Institution
- Occupation: Stockbroker

Sir William Frederick Coates, 1st Baronet, DL, JP (1866 – 19 January 1932) was an Irish stockbroker and politician in Belfast.

== Early life ==
Coates was born in Belfast in 1866. He studied at the Royal Belfast Academical Institution. He was the son of David Lindsay Coates and Sara (née Mulligan) Coates.

== Career ==
He initially entered the linen trade, but became a stockbroker in 1887, building up an extensive business known as William F. Coates & Co, stockbrokers. In 1902 he was elected to Belfast Corporation. He was chairman of the finance committee from 1917 and was elected Lord Mayor of Belfast in 1920 and then re-elected twice, serving until 1923.

He hosted the King and Queen when they visited Belfast to open the Parliament of Northern Ireland (of which he was also a Senator, both ex officio as Lord Mayor and as an elected member 1924-1929) in July 1921. For hosting the monarchs, and guiding Belfast past the sectarian conflict that marked the creation of Northern Ireland in the early 1920s, Coates was created a Baronet of Haypark. He served as Lord Mayor again from 1929 to 1931.

He served as High Sheriff of Belfast (1906–1907) and as High Sheriff of Antrim (1931–1932).

== Personal life ==
On 27 November 1907, Coates married Elsie Millicent Gregory, daughter of Colonel Frederick William Gregory. Together, they were the parents of:

- Jean Ann Dorothy Coates, who married Thomas Roland Lecky Sinclair in 1938.
- Sir Frederick Gregory Lindsay Coates, 2nd Baronet (1916–1994), who was a Brigadier in the Royal Tank Regiment. He married Joan Nugent Spinks, daughter of Major-General Sir Charlton Watson Spinks.

Coates died on 19 January 1932 and was succeeded by his son Frederick. Upon his son's death in 1994, Sir William's grandson, David Frederick Charlton Coates (b. 1948), became the 3rd Baronet.

== Arms ==
Coat of arms of Sir William Coates, 1st Baronet

Notes
Granted 20 June 1923 by Sir Nevile Rodwell Wilkinson, Ulster King of Arms.
Crest
On a wreath of the colours a cock statant wings closed Gules.
Escutcheon
Gules a chevron cotised Argent on a chief Ermine two bells Or on an escutcheon of pretence quarterly 1st & 4th Argent a fir tree growing out of a mount in base Vert surmounted by a sword in bend supporting an Imperial crown in the dexter canton Proper and in chief and base a lion's head erased Azure 2nd & 3rd Gules three bears' heads couped Argent muzzled Sable.
Motto
Watchful And Bold

Civic offices
Preceded by Henry O'Neill	High Sheriff of Belfast; 1906 – 1907	Succeeded by Peter O'Connell
Preceded by John C. White	Lord Mayor of Belfast; 1920 – 1923	Succeeded by William George Turner
Preceded by William George Turner	Lord Mayor of Belfast; 1929 – 1931	Succeeded by Crawford McCullagh
Baronetage of the United Kingdom
New creation	Baronet (of Haypark); 1921–1932	Succeeded by Frederick Coates
