= Oflag XII-A =

German-run WWII prisoner-of-war camp

- Hadamar, Germany

Site information
- Type: Prisoner-of-war camp
- Controlled by: Nazi Germany

Location
- Hadamar, Germany (pre-war borders, 1937)
- Coordinates: 50.4479°N 8.0350°E

Site history
- In use: 1939–1945
- Battles/wars: World War II

Garrison information
- Occupants: Polish, French, British and other Allied POWs

Oflag XII-A was a German-run prisoner of war camp for Allied officers during World War II. It was located at Hadamar, near Limburg an der Lahn in western Germany. It was created in November 1939 for Polish officers captured in the September campaign. In June 1942 it was renumbered Oflag XII-B.

== Timeline ==
- November 1939 - Polish officers and a small number of orderlies were transported to Hadamar from other collection camps in Poland.
- In June 1942 the Polish officers were transferred to other camps, such as Oflag VII-A Murnau and Oflag VI-B, Dössel. In their place British, French and other Allied officers were transferred to Hadamar from the citadel of Mainz. It was then renumbered Oflag XII-B.
- In 1943, after the withdrawal of Italy from the war, the German army transferred Allied officers from camps in Italy, such as Sulmona, to Hadamar.
- The camp was liberated 26 March 1945 by the United States Army.

== Prominent inmates ==
- George Haig, 2nd Earl Haig, son of Field-Marshal Haig
- Edward Ward, 7th Viscount Bangor, BBC war correspondent
