= Billy Boyd (politician) =

Northern Irish politician (1921–1989)

William Robinson Boyd (27 November 1921 – July 1989) was a politician from Northern Ireland.

== Life and career ==
William Robinson Boyd was born on 27 November 1921. He worked in the shipyards of Belfast and became active in the Northern Ireland Labour Party (NILP) and stood unsuccessfully in Belfast Woodvale in the 1953 Northern Ireland general election, then again in a 1955 by-election. That same year, he was elected to Belfast City Council, a seat he held until 1977.

In 1958, he was finally elected for Woodvale, and in 1963 he became the Deputy Chairman of Ways and Means and Deputy Speaker of the House of Commons. He stood for Westminster at the 1964 United Kingdom general election in Belfast West, taking 24% of the votes cast.

Boyd lost his seat at the 1965 Northern Ireland general election, and failed to regain it in 1969. He then stood unsuccessfully in Belfast West for the Northern Ireland Assembly, 1973 and the UK general election, February 1974, by now only able to take 4% of the vote. Following a final candidature for the Northern Ireland Constitutional Convention in Belfast North, he resigned from the NILP and stood as an independent in the same seat for the Northern Ireland Assembly, 1982. In March 1989, it was reported that Boyd had defected to the Alliance Party of Northern Ireland.

Boyd died after a short illness in July 1989, aged 67.

Parliament of Northern Ireland
Preceded by Neville Martin	Member of Parliament for Belfast Woodvale; 1958–1965	Succeeded by John McQuade
Political offices
Preceded by Brian McConnell	Deputy Chairman of Ways and Means and Deputy Speaker of the Northern Ireland House of Commons; 1963–1965	Succeeded by James O'Reilly
