= Emma Duffin =

Northern Irish nurse, diarist and welfare worker (1883–1979)

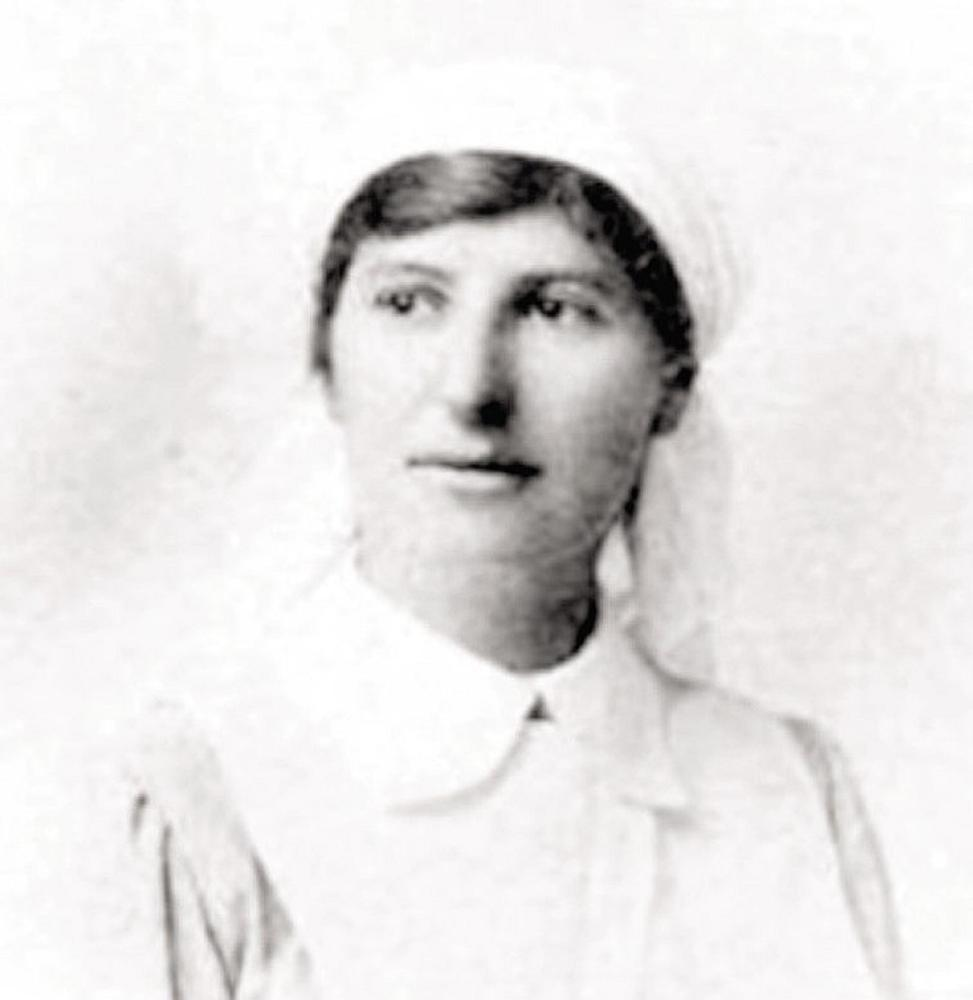
- Born: Emma Sylvia Duffin; 8 November 1883; Belfast, Ireland
- Died: 31 January 1979 (aged 95); Belfast, Northern Ireland

Emma Duffin (8 November 1883 – 31 January 1979) was a Northern Irish nurse, diarist and welfare worker.

== Early life ==
Emma Sylvia Duffin was born at 26 University Square, Belfast on 8 November 1883. Her parents were Adam and Maria Duffin (née Drennan). She was the fourth daughter of their seven daughters and two sons. Both the Duffins and the Drennans were well connected in business and politics, with a tradition of taking part in public life, and were part of the non-subscribing Presbyterians. Her mother's grandfather was William Drennan. All of the Duffin's daughters were privately educated by their mother and German governesses, and all seven of them attended Cheltenham Ladies' College. Duffin attended the College in May 1900, later attending a school in Shrewsbury in 1903, and took classes at the Belfast Art College. She was interested in pursuing a career in book illustration. She illustrated children's books and books of verse written by her sisters, Celia and Ruth. Ruth was the first warden at a women's residence for Queen's University Belfast, Riddel Hall. From 1911 to 1912, Duffin worked for the Van Bochen family as a governess in Pomerania, Germany.

== Career in World War I ==
After the outbreak of World War I, Duffin and three of her sisters enlisted in the Voluntary Aid Detachment nurses (VADs). She was called up in autumn 1915, and posted to a general hospital in Alexandria, Egypt. Though she lacked nursing experience, aged 31, she was older than most VADs. As her experience grew, she was posted to different wards. She signed up for a further 6 months in 1916, and was posted to Le Havre, France, initially to an isolation hospital and then to La Gare. La Gare was a converted railway station that was acting as a large clearing house for badly wounded soldiers. Here Duffin nursed men who had suffered in the trenches. The work was hard, and the nurses' living condition were rough. Duffin also worked on the docks with men being nursed before they were repatriated, there she worked night and day, and went weeks without a change of clothes. Later that year she was transferred to another hospital in Le Havre, which had been a hotel.

In Autumn 1917, she lived in a former emigrants' hostel which was infested with bed bugs, and where a leak meant her bed was soaking wet when it rained. When the 1918 influenza pandemic hit, Duffin was deployed to the Quai hospital, nursing hundreds of wounded and sick German prisoners of war as they were sent to England. From coming into contact with soldiers' uniforms and bedding, Duffin suffered secondary gassing. There and in Calais in early autumn 1918, Duffin experienced nightly air raids. In her diary, she vividly described Armistice Day on 11 November 1918 in Calais. She was not demobbed until spring 1919, returning to Belfast to live with her mother and unmarried sisters at the new family home at Dunowen, Cliftonville Road, Belfast.

Duffin kept a diary of some description during her service, and later wrote up a long, more formal narrative after the war. Unusual for such accounts, she was sympathetic to German prisoners, writing about how they were grateful she could speak to them in German and for her small kindnesses to them. Her diary documents her war experiences, but also details of nursing etiquette and procedures. Against her will she was promoted to assistant nurse, she did not want to affect her voluntary status, and she later turned down training to pursue a nursing career. She was mentioned in despatches in December 1918.

== Career after the war ==
Duffin's mother was involved in the Belfast Council of Social Welfare since its foundation in 1906. Her mother lived to 100, dying in 1954, when Duffin took over her role. She sat on the society's committee from 1923, serving as secretary from 1933 to 1953. The society was an umbrella group over Belfast's charities, giving financial and social support to poor families, investigating the social circumstances of cases, pioneering free legal aid and advice, and was involved with the provision of subsidised housing. Duffin started the Belfast hospitals' aftercare committee, employing people to support those discharged from hospital. She lobbied civil servants and Belfast Corporation officials about the design of public housing in the late 1930s. She served as a chair of the Council of Social Welfare on the Women's Advisory Housing Council of Northern Ireland from 1943 to 1947.

Duffin started writing a diary again after the outbreak of World War II in 1939. Alongside other former VADs, Duffin was asked to volunteer to provide first aid. In February 1940, she was appointed VAD commandant of the Stranmillis Military Hospital, later posted to the Donegall Road Military Hospital. After the blitz bombing of Belfast in April 1941, Duffin helped in the organisation of the temporary morgue in the St George's Market. In writing about it, she said she found seeing mass violent death in Belfast much harder than in World War I. She served until 1943 in Bangor, when she was demobbed. For her work she received an honorary MA from QUB in 1954. Emyr Estyn Evans mentioned her in his Encomium. She deposited her diaries in the Public Record Office of Northern Ireland as part of the larger Duffin collection. In later life she lived at Shimna, Newcastle, County Down. She died on 31 January 1979 and is buried in St Colman's graveyard, Newcastle with her sisters, Dorothea, Sylvia and Celia. On International Women's Day 2017, a Blue Plaque was erected to Duffin at her former home on University Square, Belfast unveiled by Sarah Bracher and her great-niece Emma Makin.
