= William John McDowell =

Politician from Northern Ireland (1863–1929)

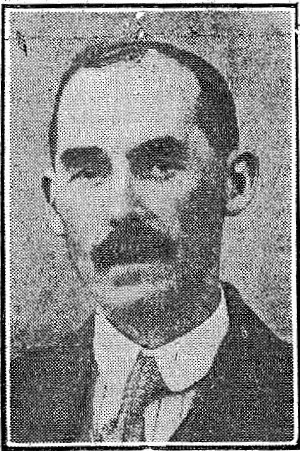
Northern Ireland Senator William John McDowell (1861-1929)

William John McDowell (6 October 1861 – 29 June 1929) was a unionist politician in Northern Ireland.

== Biography ==
William John McDowell was born 6 October 1861, to parents Robert and Jane McDowell. He was born at sea en route to India, where his father was to be stationed with the British Royal Artillery.

McDowell worked as a power loom tenter for much of his life at Belfast's Brookfield Linen Company, starting as an apprentice and later managing its Agnes Street factory. He was active in trade union and friendly society movements, including serving as a local Secretary of the National Health Insurance Society (which provided access to health care for the poor and working class). McDowell was an "energetic executive officer from the start" of the Ulster Unionist Labour Association, and also an active member of the Orange Institution (Newtownards, and Duncairn lodges) and Freemasons (Enfield Temperance Masonic Lodge).

William John McDowell was elected to the first Senate of Northern Ireland as an Ulster Unionist Party member, and was reported to be a forceful speaker. During opposition to the Home Rule Bill, McDowell was sent on various deputations to England, appearing before Cabinet Ministers and key organisations. He served until his death on 29 June 1929, just one month after being re-elected in the 1929 Northern Ireland general election.
