= Paddy O'Hare =

Paddy O'Hare was a journalist and Irish nationalist politician.

O'Hare became the editor of the Fermanagh Herald. In 1945, he established a branch of the Irish Anti-Partition League in County Fermanagh. He became a Nationalist Party member of the Senate of Northern Ireland in 1949, and remained a Senator until the proroguement of the Senate in 1972. In 1965, he served as the party's Chief Whip.
