= John Stewart Johnston =

John Stewart Johnston (7 May 1906 – ) was a unionist politician in Northern Ireland.

Johnston was born in Lurgan, the second son of Sir John Johnston MP. He studied at Bootham School in Yorkshire and in Montreux. He returned to Northern Ireland, where he became a director of a linen company. Despite having no political experience, he was elected as an Ulster Unionist Party member of the Senate of Northern Ireland in 1958, serving until 1965; he was then re-elected in 1967 and served until the abolition of the body.

== See also ==
- Politics of Northern Ireland
