= Henry Ward, 5th Viscount Bangor =

Irish peer, soldier and politician (1828–1911)

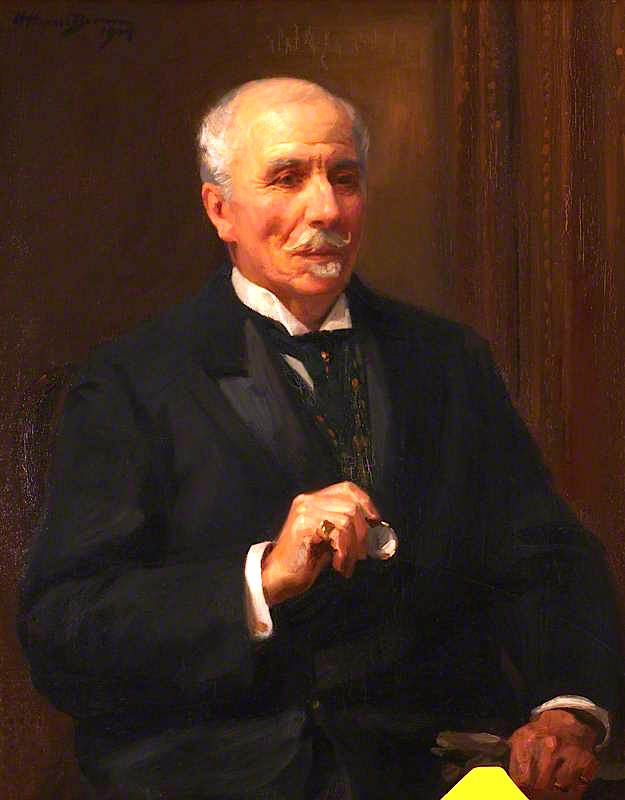
5th Viscount Bangor by Henry Harris Brown (National Trust, Castle Ward)

Henry William Crosbie Ward, 5th Viscount Bangor DL, JP (26 July 1828 – 23 February 1911), styled The Honourable from birth until 1881, was an Irish peer, Conservative politician and soldier.

== Background ==
He was the second son of Edward Ward, 3rd Viscount Bangor and his wife Harriet Margaret Maxwell, second daughter of Henry Maxwell, 6th Baron Farnham. Ward was educated at Rugby School and then at the Royal Military College, Sandhurst. In 1881, he succeeded his older brother Edward as viscount.

== Career ==
Ward entered the British Army in 1846 and served in the 43rd (Monmouthshire) Regiment of Foot. He fought in the Xhosa Wars and retired in 1854 as captain. In 1886, Ward was elected an Irish representative peer to the House of Lords. He was a deputy lieutenant of County Down and represented the county also as justice of the peace.

== Family ==
On 6 December 1854, he married the Irish entomologist, microscopist, and author Mary King, a cousin of the astronomer and naturalist William Parsons, 3rd Earl of Rosse, and the pioneering photographer Mary Rosse. The couple had five daughters and three sons. In Parsonstown in 1869, Henry and Mary Ward were travelling in an experimental steam car alongside the Parsons boys when Mary was thrown from the car and died almost instantly in history's first car accident.

Henry Ward remarried Elizabeth Eccles, only daughter of Major Hugh Eccles of Cronroe on 8 April 1874. His second marriage was childless. Ward died, aged 82 at his residence Castle Ward and was buried at Ballycutter four days later.

He was succeeded in the viscountcy by his youngest and only surviving son Maxwell.

Peerage of Ireland
Preceded by Edward Ward	Viscount Bangor; 1881–1911	Succeeded by Maxwell Ward
Political offices
Preceded by The Earl Erne	Representative peer for Ireland; 1886–1911	Succeeded by The Lord Kilmaine
