= Henry Richardson (Northern Ireland politician) =

Politician from Northern Ireland

- Born: 18 January 1883; Irvinestown, County Fermanagh
- Died: 2 January 1958 (aged 74)
- Education: Eton College
- Occupation: Northern Ireland politician
- Known for: member, Senate of Northern Ireland
- Political party: Unionist
- Father: Col. John Mervyn Archdall Carleton Richardson

Henry Sacheverall Carleton Richardson (18 January 1883 – 2 January 1958) was a unionist politician in Northern Ireland.

Richardson was born in Irvinestown, County Fermanagh, to Col. John Mervyn Archdall Carleton Richardson. His father inherited Richhill Castle in 1888. He studied at Eton College before joining the British Army in 1902. In 1914, he was appointed aide-de-camp to the Governor of Tasmania. During World War I, he commanded the 8th Battalion of the Somerset Light Infantry, then the 2nd and 13th Battalions of the Rifle Brigade. He left the Army in 1920, later becoming aide-de-camp to the Duke of Abercorn.

In 1949, Richardson was appointed as an Ulster Unionist Party member of the Senate of Northern Ireland, serving until 1957. He also stood for the party in Fermanagh and South Tyrone at the 1950 general election; he took second place with 48.1% of the votes.
