= Albert Walmsley =

Albert James Walmsley was a judge and politician from Northern Ireland. He was an Ulster Unionist Party member of the Senate of Northern Ireland between 1957 and 1964.

He was portrayed in the BBC Northern Ireland documentary/drama, Scapegoat, about the murder of Sir Lancelot Curran's daughter. Walmsley was the solicitor for the defendant, Iain Hay Gordon.

== Publications ==
- Walmsley, A. J. (1959), Northern Ireland: its Policies and Record, Belfast: Ulster Unionist Council
