= Andrew Quigley =

Northern Irish politician (1860s–1937)

Andrew Quigley (1868 or 1869–1937) was a unionist politician in Northern Ireland.

Quigley worked for the Post Office. In 1929, he was elected to the Senate of Northern Ireland as an Ulster Unionist Party representative, despite having no previous political experience. He served until his death in 1937.
