= Cecil McKee =

Northern Irish unionist politician (1905-2003)

Sir William Cecil McKee ERD (1905 – January 2003) was a unionist politician in Northern Ireland.

== Life and career ==
Born in Newtownards McKee attended Methodist College Belfast. He took an engineering apprenticeship before joining the family estate agency. He was elected to the Belfast Corporation for the Ulster Unionist Party in 1934, and in 1938 took a commission in the Territorial Army's anti-aircraft brigade. He served with the British Expeditionary Force and spent part of World War II based in the Faroe Islands. He was demobbed in 1945 and returned to the council, becoming High Sheriff of Belfast in 1947 and Deputy Lord Mayor in 1948. Finally, in 1957, he was elected as the Lord Mayor of Belfast, which made him an ex-officio member of the Senate of Northern Ireland.

He received a knighthood at the end of his term of office, in 1959. The following year he received an honorary LLD from Queen's University Belfast.

In the 1967 Belfast Corporation election, McKee stood as an independent unionist, but suffered a surprise defeat.

Civic offices
Preceded by Robert Brown Alexander	High Sheriff of Belfast; 1946–1947	Succeeded by William Ernest George Johnston
Preceded by Robert Harcourt	Lord Mayor of Belfast; 1957–1959	Succeeded by Robin Kinahan
