= Leader of the Senate of Northern Ireland =

The Leader of the Senate of Northern Ireland was the Leader of the House in the Senate of Northern Ireland. The post was a cabinet position that was nevertheless politically unimportant. In his memoirs, Brian Faulkner expresses surprise that Jack Andrews accepted the position, as he saw it as a demotion.

The Deputy Leader of the Senate of Northern Ireland was the third-ranking position in the Senate, after the Leader and the Speaker. The position of Deputy Leader was established, along with the Senate itself, in 1921, and the position was abolished in 1961.

== List of leaders ==
	Name	Entered office	Left office	Party
1.	Charles Vane-Tempest-Stewart, 7th Marquess of Londonderry	1921	1926	Ulster Unionist Party
2.	James Caulfeild, 8th Viscount Charlemont	1926	1937	Ulster Unionist Party
3.	John Hanna Robb	1937	1943	Ulster Unionist Party
4.	Robert Corkey	1943	1944	Ulster Unionist Party
5.	Sir Roland Nugent	1944	1951	Ulster Unionist Party
6.	Alexander Gordon	1951	1961	Ulster Unionist Party
7.	Daniel Dixon	1961	1964	Ulster Unionist Party
8.	Jack Andrews	1964	1972	Ulster Unionist Party

== List of deputy leaders ==
	Name	Entered office	Left office	Party
1.	Algernon Skeffington, 12th Viscount Massereene	1921	1929	Ulster Unionist Party
2.	Maxwell Ward, 6th Viscount Bangor	1929	1930	Ulster Unionist Party
3.	John Andrew Long	1930	1941	Ulster Unionist Party
4.	Sir Joseph Davison	1941	1948	Ulster Unionist Party
5.	William Moore Wallis Clark	1948	1960	Ulster Unionist Party
6.	Daniel McGladdery	1960	1961	Ulster Unionist Party

== See also ==
- Speaker of the Senate of Northern Ireland
