= William Ernest Stevenson =

Politician in Northern Ireland

William Ernest Stevenson (born 1871 or 1872) was a unionist politician in Northern Ireland.

Stevenson worked as a director of a textile company. In 1940, he was elected to the Senate of Northern Ireland as an Ulster Unionist Party representative. He served until 1945, then from later in 1945 until 1954.
