= Daniel McGladdery =

Daniel Ritchie McGladdery was a politician in Northern Ireland. He was active in the Amalgamated Engineering Union in Belfast, becoming a shop steward.

He was elected as an Ulster Unionist member of the Senate of Northern Ireland in 1957, and served until the Senate's abolition in 1973. He was Deputy Leader of the Senate from 1960 until the office was abolished in 1961, and served as Parliamentary Secretary in the Department of the Prime Minister from 1960 to 1970.

Political offices
Preceded by William Moore Wallis Clark	Deputy Leader of the Senate of Northern Ireland; 1960–1961	Office abolished
Preceded by William Moore Wallis Clark	Parliamentary Secretary, Department of the Prime Minister (Northern Ireland); 1960–1970	Succeeded by John Brooke, 2nd Viscount Brookeborough
