= East Down (Northern Ireland Parliament constituency) =

Coordinates: 54.386°N 5.431°W

- Former County constituency for the Parliament of Northern Ireland

Former constituency
- Created: 1929
- Abolished: 1973
- Election method: First past the post

East Down was a constituency of the Parliament of Northern Ireland.

== Boundaries ==
East Down was a county constituency comprising the towns of Ardglass, Ballynahinch, Crossgar, Downpatrick, Dunmore, Killinchy, Killyleagh, Kilmore, Saintfield and Strangford, all in the former Down District Council. It was created in 1929 as one of the eight seats replacing the former Down constituency when the House of Commons (Method of Voting and Redistribution of Seats) Act (Northern Ireland) 1929 introduced first past the post elections throughout Northern Ireland. The constituency survived unchanged, returning one member of Parliament until the Parliament of Northern Ireland was temporarily suspended in 1972, and then formally abolished in 1973.

== Politics ==
East Down had a unionist majority, and consistently elected Ulster Unionist Party members. On occasions, however, it was contested by members of the Ulster Liberal Party, and various nationalist candidates who usually received over 40% of the votes cast.

== Members of Parliament ==
Elected	Party	Name
1929	UUP	Sir Alexander Robert Gisborne Gordon
1949	UUP	Brian Faulkner

== Elections ==
General Election 1929: East Down
Party	Candidate	Votes	%	±%
UUP	Alexander Gordon	6,553	56.4	
Ulster Liberal	David Johnston	5,057	43.6	
Majority		1,496	12.8	
Turnout		11,610	74.1	
UUP win (new seat)				

At the 1933 Northern Ireland general election, Alexander Gordon was elected unopposed.

General Election 1938: East Down
Party	Candidate	Votes	%	±%
UUP	Alexander Gordon	4,989	55.2	N/A
Progressive Unionist	W. J. Price	4,050	44.8	New
Majority		939	10.4	N/A
Turnout		9,039	57.8	N/A
UUP hold		Swing	N/A	

At the 1945 Northern Ireland general election, Alexander Gordon was elected unopposed.

General Election 1949: East Down
Party	Candidate	Votes	%	±%
UUP	Brian Faulkner	8,132	59.7	N/A
Nationalist	E.K McGrady	5,480	40.3	New
Majority		2,652	19.4	N/A
Turnout		13,612	79.9	N/A
UUP hold		Swing	N/A	

At the elections of 1953, 1958 and 1962 Northern Ireland general elections, Brian Faulkner was elected unopposed.

General Election 1965: East Down
Party	Candidate	Votes	%	±%
UUP	Brian Faulkner	8,362	62.6	N/A
National Democratic	Daniel Rice	4,995	37.4	New
Majority		3,367	25.2	N/A
Turnout		13,357	73.7	N/A
UUP hold		Swing	N/A	

General Election 1969: East Down
Party	Candidate	Votes	%	±%
UUP	Brian Faulkner	8,136	51.5	N/A
National Democratic	Eddie McGrady	6,427	40.6	+3.2
Ind. Unionist	D. A. Rowan-Hamilton	1,248	7.9	New
Majority		1,709	10.9	N/A
Turnout		15,811	86.7	N/A
UUP hold		Swing		

- Parliament prorogued 30 March 1972 and abolished 18 July 1973
