= Senator Barkley =

Senator Barkley may refer to:

- Alben W. Barkley (1877–1956), U.S. Senator from Kentucky from 1927 to 1949 and from 1955 to 1956
- Dean Barkley (born 1950), U.S. Senator from Minnesota from 2002 to 2003
- James R. Barkley (1869–1948), Iowa State Senate

== See also ==
- Senator Barclay (disambiguation)
