= List of speakers of the Senate of Northern Ireland =

The Speaker of the Senate of Northern Ireland was the Speaker in the Senate of Northern Ireland.

== List of speakers ==
	Name	Entered office	Left office	Party
1.	Frederick Hamilton-Temple-Blackwood, 3rd Marquess of Dufferin and Ava	1921	1930	Ulster Unionist Party
2.	Maxwell Ward, 6th Viscount Bangor	1930	1950	Ulster Unionist Party
3.	Sir Roland Nugent	1950	1961	Ulster Unionist Party
4.	Sir Alexander Gordon	1961	1964	Ulster Unionist Party
5.	Daniel Dixon, 2nd Baron Glentoran	1964	1972	Ulster Unionist Party

== See also ==
- Leader of the Senate of Northern Ireland
