= Thaddeus Lynch (Northern Ireland politician) =

Thaddeus Lynch (born 1880), more commonly known as Ted, was a Northern Ireland politician and Bar owner.

Lynch was born in Arigna, County Roscommon in 1880.As a young man he moved to Belfast to find employment and started work in a bar washing glasses. Becoming a business man over time he succeeded in buying his own public house and eventually owned three bars in Belfast, The Monaco, The Criterion and The Duncairn Arms .

He was a senator in the Senate of Northern Ireland from 1941 to 1949.

He had ten children, six sons (Patrick Dominic, Timothy, Tom John Gerard and Edmond ) and three daughters (Madeleine, Marie and Nan). Updated by a granddaughter.

His interest in politics was carried on by subsequent generations and his daughter Madeleine Bradley was active in the establishment of the Alliance Party of Northern Ireland.

His grandson, Thaddeus (Ted) Lynch Bradley, has also been a member of the Green Party.
