= Robert Armstrong (Northern Ireland politician) =

Politician in Northern Ireland

Robert Armstrong (1888 or 1889–1961) was a unionist politician in Northern Ireland.

Armstrong worked as a shipyard fitter then, later, as a water superintendent. He joined the Ulster Unionist Party and, despite having no political experience, was elected to the Senate of Northern Ireland in 1956, serving until his death in 1961.
