= Louis Lynch =

Louis Dominick Lynch (1904 – 5 August 1976) was an Irish nationalist politician and newspaper owner.

Born in Omagh, Lynch became managing director and owner of the Ulster Herald series of newspapers.

From 1949 until 1957, Lynch served as a Nationalist Party member of the Senate of Northern Ireland.
