= John William Nixon =

Northern Irish politician

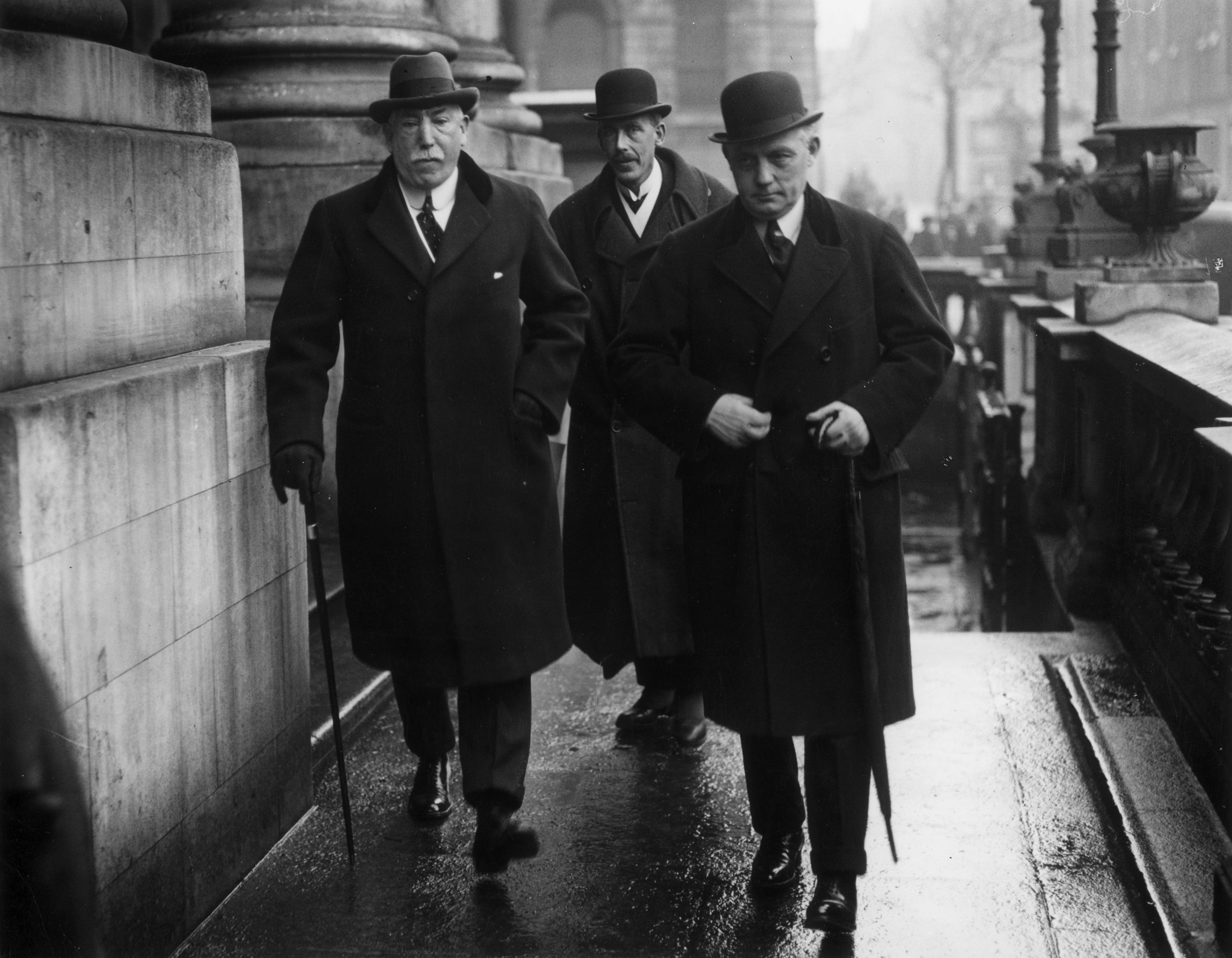
Nixon, right, with James Craig in 1922.

John William Nixon, MBE (1880 – 11 May 1949), was a unionist politician and police leader in Northern Ireland who was alleged to be responsible for several sectarian atrocities, including the McMahon killings and the Arnon Street killings. Eyewitnesses to the Arnon street killings claimed they could identify the police involved and alleged that their leader was District Inspector Nixon. It was widely believed that Nixons "murder gang" within the Royal Irish Constabulary (RIC) hunted down and murdered Catholics as reprisals for the killing of police.

Born and raised in Graddum, a townland located between the village of Kilnaleck and the hamlet of Crosskeys in County Cavan, Nixon became a district inspector in the RIC, and transferred to its successor in the then newly created region of Northern Ireland, the Royal Ulster Constabulary (RUC). By 1922, he was responsible for controlling access to the Roman Catholic Ardoyne and the Marrowbone (adjacent to Ardoyne) or "Bone" areas of Belfast, and worked closely with the Ulster Special Constabulary (USC).

Irish nationalist writer and activist Michael Farrell has alleged that during this period he led the Cromwell Club, an unofficial organisation of security officials responsible for killing several Catholic civilians. These allegations have not been independently confirmed and during his lifetime Nixon successfully sued The Derry Journal and a book publisher for libel. Nixon was appointed a Member of the Order of the British Empire (MBE) in 1923 "... for services rendered by him during the troubled period." (see The Troubles in Ulster (1920–1922))

In 1924, Nixon, long a member of the Orange Order, made a political speech at an Orange lodge. This contravened RUC regulations, and he was dismissed on the orders of Sir James Craig, the first Prime Minister of Northern Ireland.

Nixon was elected to Belfast Corporation as an Independent Unionist, but at the 1925 Northern Ireland general election, he stood unsuccessfully as an Ulster Unionist Party candidate in Belfast North. In 1929, running once again as an Independent Unionist, he was narrowly elected as the MP for Belfast Woodvale. From September 1932 until the 1933 election, he was the only opposition MP attending the Parliament. Around this time, he joined the Ulster Protestant League, an organisation with a reputation for anti-Catholicism.

Nixon held his seat until his death in 1949, denying the murder allegations against him until the end of his life.

Parliament of Northern Ireland
New constituency	Member of Parliament for Belfast Woodvale; 1929–1949	Succeeded by Robert Harcourt
