= William Stewart (Northern Ireland senator) =

Politician in Northern Ireland

William Stewart (born 11 May 1911, died 29 Dec 1977) was a unionist politician in Northern Ireland.

Stewart studied at a technical college and ran before becoming a company director. For most of his life he owned a chemist/grocer's, Stewart & Chapmans based on Church St in Dungannon, Co. Tyrone. He joined the Ulster Unionist Party and was elected to the Senate of Northern Ireland in 1957, serving until its abolition in 1972. From 1960 to 1962, he was a Deputy Speaker of the Senate and also served as chairman of Dungannon Urban District Council.

== M1 campaign ==
In June 1966, as chairman of Dungannon Urban District Council, Stewart took part in a council protest against the deferral of an M1 extension bypassing the town, arguing that the council had contributed £160,000 towards the scheme.
