= Joseph Maguire (politician) =

Irish politician

Joseph Maguire (died 29 June 1951) was a politician in Northern Ireland.

Maguire purchased Kilmore House in 1919. He was selected as a Nationalist Party member of the Senate of Northern Ireland in 1937, and from 1939 to 1942 was Deputy Speaker of the Senate. He died in 1951, while still in office.
