= William Jenkins (Northern Ireland politician) =

Politician from Northern Ireland (born 1904)

Sir William Jenkins

Lord Mayor of Belfast
- In office 1963–1966
- Preceded by: Martin Kelso Wallace
- Succeeded by: William Duncan Geddis

High Sheriff of Belfast
- In office 1961–1962
- Preceded by: William Duncan Geddis
- Succeeded by: William McCracken

Personal details
- Born: 25 July 1904
- Died: 1983

Sir William Jenkins (25 July 1904 – January 1983) was a unionist politician in Northern Ireland.

Jenkins studied at the Belfast College of Technology then worked in Bombay from 1931 to 1956 as the director of a tea company. He then returned to Northern Ireland, where he held numerous directorships, but also found time to sit on the Belfast Corporation as an Ulster Unionist Party member. He served as Lord Mayor of Belfast from 1963 to 1966.

Civic offices
Preceded by William Duncan Geddis	High Sheriff of Belfast; 1961–1962	Succeeded by William McCracken
Preceded by Martin Kelso Wallace	Lord Mayor of Belfast; 1963–1966	Succeeded by William Duncan Geddis
