= Gerald Browne (politician) =

Politician in Northern Ireland

Gerald Browne (1871 or 1872–1951) was a unionist politician in Northern Ireland.

Browne worked as a journalist. He joined the Ulster Unionist Party and was elected to the Senate of Northern Ireland in 1942, serving until his death in 1951. From 1947 to 1949, he was a Deputy Speaker of the Senate.
