= William Barclay (Northern Ireland politician) =

Northern Irish politician

William Barclay (1873 or 1874–1945) was a unionist politician in Northern Ireland.

Barclay worked as a shipyard joiner and was elected to the Senate of Northern Ireland as an Ulster Unionist Party member in 1925, despite having no political experience. He served until his death in 1945.
