= Hugh O'Doherty =

Hugh O'Doherty (died 10 March 1924) was an Irish nationalist politician.

O'Doherty worked as a solicitor in County Londonderry. A supporter of Charles Stewart Parnell, he was a founder member of the Irish National League. Following Parnell's death, O'Doherty withdrew from politics until 1918, when he was elected to Derry Corporation as a Nationalist Party councillor. Later in 1918, his daughter drowned on the RMS Leinster.

In 1920, a nationalist majority emerged on the Londonderry Corporation, and O'Doherty was elected as the first nationalist and first Roman Catholic Mayor of Derry, a post which carried with it membership of the Senate of Northern Ireland. Although seen as a neutral candidate, acceptable to both the Nationalist Party group and to the Sinn Féin grouping, his inaugural speech did little to allay the fears of the Unionist population of the city: "Ireland's right to determine her own destiny will come about whether the Protestants of Ulster like it or not". He ordered that the Union Jack should not be flown from the Guildhall. He also campaigned for Derry to be included in the Irish Free State. In 1922, O'Doherty called a conference of all nationalists in Northern Ireland, in a first attempt to develop a common platform.

O'Doherty's term as mayor ended in 1923, and he died the following year.

Civic offices
Preceded by Robert Newton Anderson	Mayor of Londonderry; 1920–1923	Succeeded by Maxwell Moore
