= William James Smyth =

Politician from Northern Ireland

William James Smyth (1886 – 28 January 1950) was a labour member of the Senate of Northern Ireland.

Smyth became active in the Northern Ireland Labour Party (NILP) and was elected to the Senate of Northern Ireland in 1945. He served as chairman of the Parliamentary NILP and also sat on the party's executive committee. He died, aged 63, while still in office.
