= Samuel Boyd (Northern Ireland politician) =

Samuel Wilson Boyd (born 1886 or 1887) was a unionist politician in Northern Ireland.

Boyd studied at Campbell College in Belfast, then worked as a distiller. He joined the Ulster Unionist Party, and was elected to the Senate of Northern Ireland in 1955, serving until his resignation in 1962. He was a Deputy Speaker of the Senate from 1959 to 1962.
