= William Geddis =

British politician (1896–1971)

Sir William Duncan Geddis (9 July 1896 – 12 December 1971) was a unionist politician in Northern Ireland.

Geddis studied at Skerries College in Belfast before becoming a clothing manufacturer. He served in the Royal Army Ordnance Corps from 1940 to 1948, retiring with the rank of Major.

He was elected to the Belfast Corporation for the Ulster Unionist Party and served as Lord Mayor of Belfast from 1966 to 1969. He was knighted in 1969.

Civic offices
Preceded by Martin Kelso Wallace	High Sheriff of Belfast; 1960–1961	Succeeded by William Jenkins
Preceded by William Jenkins	Lord Mayor of Belfast; 1966–1969	Succeeded by Joseph Foster Cairns
