= David McClelland (politician) =

Northern Irish politician

Member of the Senate of Northern Ireland
- In office 1967–1973

Personal details
- Born: David Alexander McClelland c. 1909
- Died: January 1987 (aged 77–78); Craigavad, County Down, Northern Ireland
- Political party: Ulster Unionist Party

David Alexander McClelland (c. 1909– January 1987) was a unionist politician in Northern Ireland.

McClelland was elected as an Ulster Unionist Party member of the Senate of Northern Ireland in 1967, serving until its abolition in 1973.

McClelland died in Craigavad in January 1987 at the age of 78.
