= John McCormick (British politician) =

John Kennedy McCormick (1887 or 1888– 20 August 1958) was a unionist politician in Northern Ireland. McCormick, from Donard View, Donaghcloney, worked as a company director and joined the Ulster Unionist Party. Despite having no previous political experience, he was elected to the Senate of Northern Ireland in 1947, filling in the vacancy caused by the death of William Sinclair Kingan in late 1946. He served until his death in 1958.
