= William Ernest George Johnston =

Politician from Northern Ireland

Lord Mayor of Belfast
- In office 1949–1951

High Sheriff of Belfast
- In office 1947–1948

Personal details
- Born: 31 October 1884 Belfast, Northern Ireland, United Kingdom
- Died: 26 October 1951 (aged 66) Belfast, Northern Ireland, United Kingdom
- Education: Campbell College, Belfast; Queen's University Belfast

Sir William Ernest George Johnston, DL (31 October 1884 – 26 October 1951) was a Unionist politician and businessman in Northern Ireland.

== Life and career ==
Born in Belfast, William Johnston was the son of Rt. Hon. Sir James Johnston, of Belvoir Park. Educated at Campbell College, Belfast and the Queen's University of Belfast he then entered his father's firm, James Johnston & Co. Ltd., flax merchants based at Donegall Street in Belfast. Thus, like many of his contemporaries, Sir William's family was involved in Ulster's thriving linen trade.

In Belfast's civic life, Sir William was high sheriff and Lord Mayor of Belfast from May 1949 to May 1951, and an ex officio member of the Senate of Northern Ireland, the upper house of the Stormont Parliament. He was knighted in the 1951 King's Birthday Honours List.

== Personal life ==
In 1912 he married Olive Patterson, the daughter of Rev. Dr. William Patterson, of Cooke Church, Toronto, Ontario, Canada. The couple had one son and lived at Wellington Park, Malone Road, Belfast, where Sir William died in 1951.

Civic offices
Preceded by Cecil McKee	High Sheriff of Belfast; 1947–1948	Succeeded by James Norritt
Preceded by William Neill	Lord Mayor of Belfast; 1949–1951	Succeeded by James Norritt
