= Mary Ward (scientist) =

Anglo-Irish scientist and writer

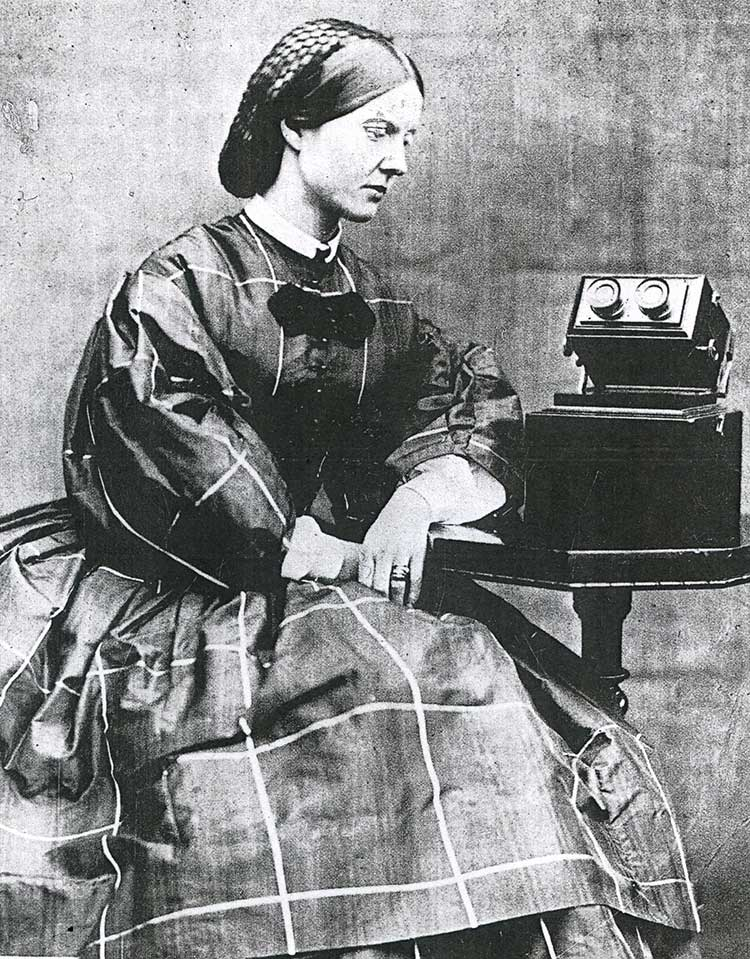
- Mary Ward with her microscope c. 1860
- Born: Mary King; 27 April 1827; Ballylin, County Offaly, Ireland
- Died: 31 August 1869 (aged 42); Parsonstown (current day Birr), County Offaly, Ireland
- Resting place: Parsons Family Vault, Old St Brendan’s Church, Birr, County Offaly, Ireland
- Other names: M.W.; The Hon. Mrs W.
- Known for: First woman to write a book on the microscope; First person known to have been killed by a motor vehicle; (Note: Although some sources assert Mary Ward to be the first person killed by a motor vehicle, a steam carriage fatal accident in July 1834 preceded Ward's demise. In the 1834 event, a steam carriage constructed by John Scott Russell and operating a public transport service between Glasgow and Paisley overturned, causing a boiler explosion which killed four or five passengers and injured others. Russell's carriage comprised a steam engine pulling a combined passenger and fuel tender; Mary Ward's accident may be characterised as the first fatality involving a vehicle in the form of a contemporary motorcar, in which the engine is mounted and passengers ride on the same frame.)
- Spouse: Henry Ward, 5th Viscount Bangor (m. 1854; he succeeded to the title in September 1881)
- Children: 8, including Maxwell Ward, 6th Viscount Bangor
- Relatives: William Parsons, 3rd Earl of Rosse (cousin)
- Scientific career
- Fields: astronomy, entomology, microscopy
- Patrons: Sir David Brewster, for whom she was an assistant and illustrator

Mary Ward (née King; 27 April 1827 – 31 August 1869) was an Irish naturalist, astronomer, microscopist, author, and artist. She was killed when she fell under the wheels of an experimental steam car built by her cousins. As the event occurred in 1869, she is the first person known to have been killed by a motor vehicle.

== Personal life ==
She was born Mary King in Ballylin near present-day Ferbane, County Offaly, on 27 April 1827, the youngest child of the Reverend Henry King and his wife Harriette. She and her sisters were educated at home, by a governess, as were most girls at the time. However, her education was slightly different from the norm because she was of a renowned scientific family. She was interested in nature from an early age, and by the time she was three years old she was collecting insects.

On 6 December 1854, she married Henry Ward of Castle Ward, County Down, who in September 1881, over twelve years after her death, succeeded to the title of Viscount Bangor. They had three sons and five daughters, including Maxwell Ward, 6th Viscount Bangor.

== Scientific career ==
Ward was a keen amateur astronomer, sharing this interest with her cousin, William Parsons, 3rd Earl of Rosse. Lord Rosse built the Leviathan of Parsonstown, a reflecting telescope with a six-foot mirror which remained the world's largest until 1917. Ward was a frequent visitor to Lord Rosse's residence at Birr Castle, producing sketches of each stage of the process. Along with photographs made by Rosse's wife Mary Rosse, Ward's sketches were used to aid in the restoration of the telescope.

Ward also drew insects, and the astronomer James South observed her doing so one day. She was using a magnifying glass to see the tiny details, and her drawing so impressed him that he immediately persuaded her father to buy her a microscope. A compound microscope made by Andrew Ross (model 112) was purchased for £48 12s 8d. This was the beginning of a lifelong passion. She began to read everything she could find about microscopy, and taught herself until she had an expert knowledge. She made her own slides from slivers of ivory, as glass was difficult to obtain, and prepared her own specimens. The physicist Sir David Brewster asked her to make his microscope specimens, and used her drawings in many of his books and articles.

Universities and most societies would not accept women, but Ward obtained information any way she could. She wrote frequently to scientists, asking them about papers they had published. In 1848, during the Great Famine, Lord Rosse was made president of the Royal Society. Rosse, to recall, was Ward's cousin and visits to his London home meant that she met many scientists.

She was one of only three women on the mailing list for the Royal Astronomical Society (the others were Queen Victoria and Mary Somerville, a scientist for whom Somerville College at Oxford University was named).

== Publications ==
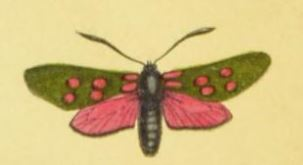
One of Ward's entomological illustrations

When Ward wrote her first book, Sketches with the microscope (privately printed in 1857), she apparently believed that no one would print it because of her gender or lack of academic credentials. She published 250 copies of it privately, and several hundred handbills were distributed to advertise it. The printing sold during the next few weeks, and this was enough to make a London publisher take the risk and contract for future publication. The book was reprinted eight times between 1858 and 1880 as A World of Wonders Revealed by the Microscope. A new full-colour facsimile edition at €20 was published in September 2019 by the Offaly Historical and Archaeological Society, with accompanying essays. (ISBN 978-1-909822-14-6). She also explored large celestial objects and wrote an amateur astronomy book, Telescope Teachings: A Familiar Sketch of Astronomical Discovery (1859), which includes a Full Moon map with names arranged in a way that creates a perspective view of the Moon. This is one of the few, if not, only, 19th century map of the Moon drawn by a female artist-astronomer.

Her books are: A Windfall for the Microscope (1856), A World of Wonders, Revealed by the Microscope (1857), Entomology in Sport, and Entomology in Earnest (1857, with Lady Jane Mahon), Microscope Teachings (1864), Telescope Teachings (1859). She illustrated her books and articles herself, as well as many books and papers by other scientists.

== Death and legacy ==
Ward is the first known automobile fatality. Lord Rosse's sons had built a steam-powered car, (Note: It was thought at the time that steam transport would be developed greatly during the near future (this was true for trains, but did not in fact become true for cars until the development of internal combustion engines). Steam cars were heavy and they did too much damage to the already uneven roads. The Locomotives Act 1865 imposed a speed limit of four miles per hour for the countryside and two miles per hour in towns. This effectively ended the popularity of motorcars, but some enthusiasts still had one, often homemade, like the Parsons' vehicle.) and on 31 August 1869 she and her husband, Henry, were travelling in it with the Parsons boys (the Hons Richard Clere Parsons and the future steam turbine pioneer Charles Algernon Parsons) and their tutor, Richard Biggs. She was thrown from the car on a bend in the road at Parsonstown (present-day Birr, County Offaly). She fell under its wheels and died almost instantly. A doctor who lived near the scene arrived within moments, and found her cut, bruised, and bleeding from the ears. The fatal injury was a broken neck. It is believed that the grieving family destroyed the car after the crash.

Ward's microscope, accessories, slides and books are on display in her husband's former home, Castle Ward in County Down, a residence now owned by the National Trust. Lord Rosse's home at Birr Castle, County Offaly, is also open to the public. Her great-granddaughter is the English actress and author Lalla Ward.

== See also ==
- Bridget Driscoll (born in Ireland, 1851/1852–1896) – first pedestrian death by automobile in Great Britain
- Henry H. Bliss (1830–1899) – first automobile death in the Americas
