= Alexander McConnell =

Member of the Senate of Northern Ireland
- In office 1956 – 1961

Personal details
- Born: 9 February 1915 Ballyclare, Northern Ireland
- Party: Ulster Unionist Party
- Occupation: Politician, publican

Alexander McConnell (born 9 February 1915, date of death unknown) was a unionist politician in Northern Ireland. He was born in Ballyclare. McConnell worked as a publican and joined the Ulster Unionist Party. He was elected to the Senate of Northern Ireland in 1956, serving until 1961.

In June 1972, it was noted that McConnell was deceased.
