= John Barnhill (politician) =

Northern Irish politician (1905–1971)

Deputy Speaker of the Senate of Northern Ireland
- In office 1967–1968

Senator of Northern Ireland
- In office 1962–1971

Personal details
- Born: John Eccles Nixon Barnhill; 11 April 1905 Strabane, Ireland
- Died: 12 December 1971 (aged 66) Brickfield House, Strabane, Northern Ireland
- Party: Ulster Unionist Party
- Education: Campbell College

John Eccles Nixon Barnhill (11 April 1905 – 12 December 1971) was an Ulster Unionist Party member of the Senate in the Parliament of Northern Ireland. Born near Strabane, the son of W. Barnhill, he was educated at Campbell College in Belfast. He was killed by three members of the Official IRA, who later fled across the border, at his home, Brickfield House, near Strabane. The Official IRA later claimed responsibility but said the killing was unintentional and that they only intended to destroy the building. He had been a Senator since 1962 and served as Deputy Speaker from 1967 to 1968. His home was also destroyed as a result of an explosion during the incident. Barnhill was also an officer of the Orange Order.

A plaque commemorating his murder was unveiled at Stormont on the 30th anniversary of his death on 12 December 2001.
