= Joseph Foster Cairns =

Businessperson and politician from Northern Ireland

- Born: 27 June 1920
- Died: 2 May 1981 (aged 60)

Joseph Foster Cairns (27 June 1920 – 2 May 1981) was a unionist politician in Northern Ireland.

Cairns was the managing director of a furniture retailer, and chairman of a development company. He was elected to the Belfast Corporation for the Ulster Unionist Party, and served as Lord Mayor of Belfast from 1969 to 1972. At the 1969 Northern Ireland general election, he stood in Belfast Oldpark, but was not elected. Cairns died in May 1981 at the age of 60.

Civic offices
Preceded by William McCracken	High Sheriff of Belfast; 1963–1964	Succeeded by William Christie
Preceded by William Duncan Geddis	Lord Mayor of Belfast; 1969–1972	Succeeded by William Christie
