= Maxwell Ward, 6th Viscount Bangor =

Northern Irish politician (1868–1950)

The Right Honourable The Viscount Bangor OBE PC (Ire)
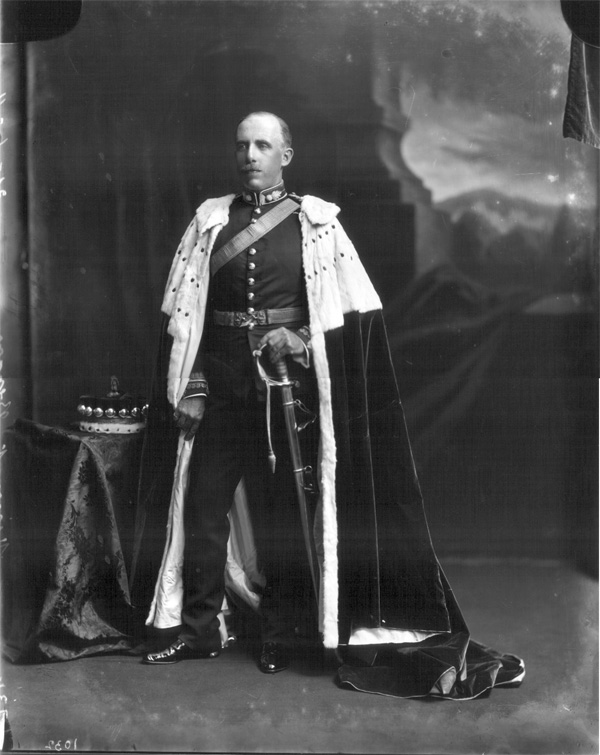
- Lord Bangor dressed in coronation robes, 1911

Deputy Leader of the Senate of Northern Ireland
- In office 1929–1950
- Leader: James Caulfeild, 8th Viscount Charlemont

Senator of Northern Ireland
- In office 1921–1950

Member of the House of Lords
- In office 1950 – 1913; Representative peer
- Nominated by: Peerage of Ireland

Personal details
- Born: 4 May 1868
- Died: 17 November 1950 (aged 82) Castle Ward, County Down, Northern Ireland
- Party: Ulster Unionist Party
- Children: Edward Ward, 7th Viscount Bangor
- Parents: Henry Ward, 5th Viscount Bangor; Mary Ward
- Education: Royal Military Academy, Woolwich

Military service
- Allegiance: United Kingdom
- Branch/service: British Army
- Rank: Major; Lieutenant Colonel (temporarily)
- Unit: Royal Artillery; Army Ordnance Depot, 63rd (Royal Naval) Division
- Commands: Antrim Royal Garrison Artillery
- Battles/wars: World War I

Maxwell Richard Crosbie Ward, 6th Viscount Bangor OBE PC (Ire) (4 May 1868 – 17 November 1950), was an Irish peer and politician.

== Early life and education ==
Ward was born to Henry Ward, 5th Viscount Bangor, and his first wife, scientific illustrator Mary Ward, who died in the world's first motoring accident in 1869.

He was educated at Harrow School and the Royal Military Academy, Woolwich.

== Military service ==
Ward was commissioned a second lieutenant in the Royal Artillery on 23 July 1887, and promoted to lieutenant on 23 July 1890. He was promoted to captain on 1 April 1898, appointed divisional adjutant in February 1900, then ADC to General Lord William Seymour, Commander of the British Troops in Canada. He was back in Britain as Instructor at the School of Gunnery from 10 October 1900. Promotion to major came in 1906. After his father's death in 1911, he succeeded to the title of Viscount Bangor. He retired from active duty in 1912 and commanded the Antrim Royal Garrison Reserve Artillery. He was recommissioned in 1914 after the start of the First World War. He was appointed an Officer of the Order of the British Empire in the 1919 New Year Honours. He was temporarily appointed a Lieutenant Colonel while in the Royal Naval Division Army Ordnance Depot.

== Political career ==
He was a representative peer in the House of Lords from 1913 to 1950 and an Ulster Unionist member of the Senate of Northern Ireland from 1921 until his death in 1950. He was Deputy Leader of the Senate and Parliamentary Secretary in the Department of the Prime Minister from 1929 to 1930 before serving as Speaker of the Senate from 1930 to 1950.

== Family ==
Ward married, in 1905, Agnes Elizabeth (née Hamilton), with whom he had one son and three daughters. He was succeeded by his son Edward Ward, a journalist who made his name as a BBC foreign correspondent. His granddaughter is the actress Sarah "Lalla" Ward.

He died at his home, Castle Ward near Strangford, County Down, at the age of 82.

Political offices
Preceded by The Lord Headley	Representative peer for Ireland; 1913–1950	Office lapsed
Preceded by The Viscount Massereene	Deputy Leader of the Senate of Northern Ireland; 1929–1930	Succeeded by John Andrew Long
Preceded by The Viscount Massereene	Parliamentary Secretary, Department of the Prime Minister (Northern Ireland); 1929–1930	Succeeded by John Andrew Long
Preceded by The Marquess of Dufferin and Ava	Speaker of the Senate of Northern Ireland; 1930–1950	Succeeded by Roland Nugent
Peerage of Ireland
Preceded by Henry Ward	Viscount Bangor; 1911–1950	Succeeded by Edward Ward
