= Henry Fleming (Northern Ireland politician) =

Henry Fleming MBE (1871 or 1872–1956) was a unionist politician in Northern Ireland.

Fleming worked as a shipyard plater at Harland & Wolff, and served as the Irish auditor of the United Society of Boilermakers. He joined the Ulster Unionist Party and, despite having no previous political experience, was elected to the Senate of Northern Ireland in 1945, serving until his death in 1956.

Fleming was awarded the Member of the MBE.
