= Joseph Davison =

Northern Irish Unionist politician

Sir Joseph Davison (1868 – 15 July 1948) was a prominent Northern Irish Unionist politician.

He was knighted in the Honours for the Opening of the Parliament of Northern Ireland in 1921. In 1923, Davison stood as the Ulster Unionist Party candidate in a by-election in Belfast West to the Northern Ireland House of Commons, but was beaten by independent Unionist Philip James Woods.

In 1933, writing in the Northern Whig, Davison stated "...it is time Protestant employers of Northern Ireland realised that whenever a Roman Catholic is brought into their employment it means one Protestant vote less... I suggest the slogan should be 'Protestants employ Protestants'".

By 1935, Davison was the County Grand Master of the Orange Order in Belfast. When Prime Minister of Northern Ireland James Craig attempted to ban all marches from 18 June, Davison led the objections, and the ban was lifted within days.

In 1935, Davison was elected to the Senate of Northern Ireland. He served as Deputy Speaker from 1936 until 1937. In 1940, he was appointed to the Privy Council of Northern Ireland. He was then Deputy Leader of the Senate and Parliamentary Secretary in the Department of the Prime Minister from 1941 until his death. Also in 1941, Davison was appointed Parliamentary Secretary to the Department of the Prime Minister, serving in this post until his death.

Sir Joseph Davison became Grand Master of the Orange Institution of Ireland by 1941, serving until his death in 1948.

Civic offices
Preceded by William Turner	High Sheriff of Belfast; 1921–1922	Succeeded by Henry McKeag
Political offices
Preceded by John Andrew Long	Deputy Leader of the Senate of Northern Ireland; 1941–1948	Succeeded by William Moore Wallis Clark
Preceded by John Andrew Long	Parliamentary Secretary, Department of the Prime Minister (Northern Ireland); 1941–1948	Succeeded by William Moore Wallis Clark
Non-profit organization positions
Preceded by Edward Archdale	Grand Master of the Orange Institution of Ireland; 1941?–1948	Succeeded by J. M. Andrews
