= Kennedy Stewart (Northern Ireland politician) =

Politician in Northern Ireland

Kennedy Stewart, Jr. (6 February 1883 – 10 August 1964) was a unionist politician in Northern Ireland.

Stewart was born in Belfast, the son of accountant Kennedy Stewart, Sr. and Mary Gardner Marshall. He had two brothers and three sisters.

He worked as a company director, and joined the Ulster Unionist Party. Despite having no previous political experience, he was elected to the Senate of Northern Ireland in 1945, serving until his resignation in 1955. From 1949–51, he served as a Deputy Speaker of the Senate.

He succeeded his brother-in-law Sir Samuel Kelly after the latter's death in early 1938 as managing director of coastal shipping company John Kelly, Ltd. He was a member of the Harbour Board for 13 years, resigning in 1951 for health reasons. He remained with the Senate for four more years until also stepping down for health reasons.
