= Thomas McLaughlin (politician) =

Nationalist politician from Northern Ireland

Member of Senate of Northern Ireland
- In office 1933-1944

Personal details
- Born: 1878 or 1879; Armagh, Ireland
- Died: April 1944 (aged 66)
- Political party: Irish Nationalist

Thomas McLaughlin (1878 or 1879 – April 1944) was an Irish nationalist politician.

== Biography ==
Born in Armagh, he became politically active and rose to become the chair of Armagh Urban Council and a member of Armagh County Council. He also served as Supreme Knight of the Knights of Saint Columbanus. In 1928, he was the founding chairman of the National League of the North in Armagh. In 1933, he was elected to represent the Nationalist Party in the Senate of Northern Ireland, and served until his death.
