= Percival Brown =

Politician from Northern Ireland

Sir Percival Brown CBE (3 April 1901 – 4 October 1962) was a unionist politician in Northern Ireland.

Brown was born in Belfast, the son of Thomas Brown. He studied at the Royal Belfast Academical Institution and worked as an estate agent at his family's firm, Ephraim Brown & Sons. In 1936, he was elected as an Ulster Unionist Party member of the Belfast Corporation for Clifton, and in 1950 was appointed deputy lord mayor. He served two terms as Lord Mayor of Belfast from 1953 to 1955. He was appointed a Commander of the Order of the British Empire for his work organising the defense of the city in the Second World War and was knighted by Queen Elizabeth II in her coronation visit in 1953.

Civic offices
Preceded by James Norritt	Lord Mayor of Belfast; 1953–1955	Succeeded by Robert Harcourt
