= Hugh Duff (politician) =

Hugh Duff (1870 or 1871–1940) was a unionist politician in Northern Ireland.

Duff was the director of a linen manufacturing company. He joined the Ulster Unionist Party and was elected to the Senate of Northern Ireland in 1937, serving until his death in 1940.
