= Senate of Northern Ireland =

Upper house of the Parliament of Northern Ireland

- Devolved Parliament
- Arms of Northern Ireland, 1924–1972

Type
- Type: Upper house of the Parliament of Northern Ireland

History
- Established: 7 June 1921
- Disbanded: 30 March 1972

Leadership
- Speaker: Lord Glentoran (last)
- Leader: Sir Jack Andrews (last)

Elections
- Voting system: Elected by the Commons via STV

Meeting place
- Senate Chamber; Parliament Buildings, Stormont, Belfast

The Senate of Northern Ireland was the upper house of the Parliament of Northern Ireland created by the Government of Ireland Act 1920. It was abolished with the passing of the Northern Ireland Constitution Act 1973.

== Powers ==
In practice the Senate of Northern Ireland possessed little power and even less influence. While intended as a revising chamber, in practice, debates and votes typically simply replicated those in the Commons.

== Location ==
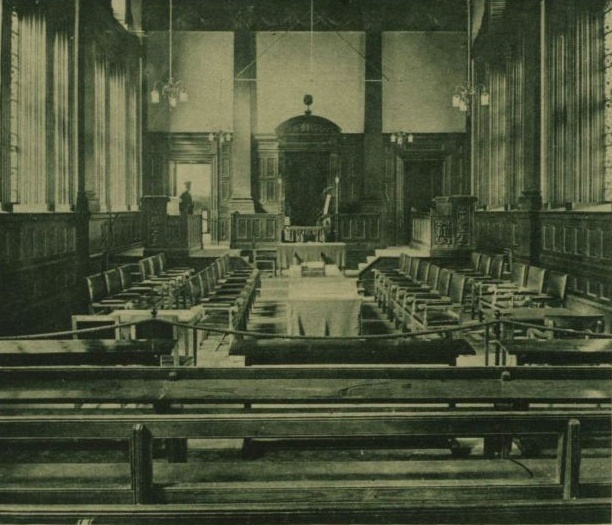
Chamber of the Senate when at Assembly's College, in 1921

From 1932, when the building was completed, until 1972, the Senate of Northern Ireland met in the Senate Chamber of Parliament Buildings in Stormont on the eastern outskirts of Belfast. To make parallels with the British House of Lords, members of the Senate sat on red benches.

== Senators ==
The Senate consisted of 26 members. Twenty-four members elected by the House of Commons of Northern Ireland using the Single Transferable Vote (STV), elected in blocks of twelve with each senator's term lasting for two parliaments (i.e. two terms of the House of Commons) and two ex-officio members: the Lord Mayor of Belfast and Mayor of Londonderry. Convention held that, in the event of a by-election, only members of the Commons from the same county would vote on their replacement. The election system was maintained even after the abolition of STV for the House of Commons.

In 1925, at the end of the first parliament, the senators to retire were selected by lot. At the subsequent election, voting papers from the Nationalist MPs and George Henderson were deemed to have been submitted late, and were not considered. All these members had given a high preference to the Nationalist candidate, Vincent Devoto, and a subsequent analysis of the transfers showed that these would otherwise have been sufficient to elect him.

=== Office-holders ===
The key offices in the Senate were:

- Speaker
- 2 Deputy Speakers
- Leader of the House
- Deputy Leader of the House (abolished in 1961).

=== Political composition ===
During its history 142 people sat in the upper house. With the addition of the Unionist Lord Mayor of Belfast Corporation and Mayor of Londonderry Corporation, together with boycotts of the Commons at various times by nationalist parties and fragmentation of the opposition into some parties too small to elect a Senator alone, the upper house proved to be even more heavily Unionist than the lower house. However a Nationalist, Thomas Stanislaus McAllister, served two periods as deputy speaker.

The table below shows the political composition of the twenty-four elected members of the Senate, after each election. It does not show subsequent changes of party allegiance, nor changes resulting from by-elections. Following the 1969 election, there was one vacant seat. Other than Hugh O'Doherty, Mayor of Londonderry until 1923, all the ex officio members were Ulster Unionists.

Election	Unionist	Labour	Nationalist	Ind. Unionist	Independent
1921	24	0	0	0	0
1925	23	1	0	0	0
1929	20	1	3	0	0
1933	18	0	5	1	0
1937	20	0	4	0	0
1945	18	1	2	1	0
1949	17	1	5	1	0
1953	18	0	5	0	1
1957	19	0	4	0	1
1962	18	1	4	0	1
1965	18	2	4	0	0
1969	16	2	5	0	0

=== Peerages ===
Peers of the Realm were disproportionately represented in the Senate. Nine senators were or became peers of the realm at the time of their membership of the Senate. These were James Hamilton, 3rd Duke of Abercorn, James Hamilton, 4th Duke of Abercorn, Maxwell Ward, 6th Viscount Bangor, James Edward Caulfeild, 8th Viscount Charlemont, Frederick Hamilton-Temple-Blackwood, 3rd Marquess of Dufferin and Ava, Daniel Dixon, 2nd Baron Glentoran, Charles Vane-Tempest-Stewart, 7th Marquess of Londonderry, Algernon Skeffington, 12th Viscount Massereene, and William Pirrie, 1st Viscount Pirrie. Lord Bangor and Lord Charlemont held Irish titles only; Lord Charlemont had been elected as an Irish representative peer and so sat in the House of Lords, Lord Bangor however did not. At least another three senators subsequently became peers by different routes. Lord Robert Grosvenor inherited the title of Duke of Westminster from his brother, Sir Basil Brooke was created Viscount Brookeborough and Victor Cooke was created a life peer as Baron Cooke of Islandreagh.

== Abolition ==
The Senate, along with the House of Commons, was prorogued by the Northern Ireland (Temporary Provisions) Act 1972, and abolished completely by the Northern Ireland Constitution Act 1973. The old Senate Chamber is now used as a committee room of the Northern Ireland Assembly.

== See also ==
- List of members of the Senate of Northern Ireland
