= Prayers at United States presidential inaugurations =

Since 1937, the United States presidential inauguration has included one or more prayers given by members of the clergy. Since 1933 an associated prayer service either public or private attended by the president-elect has often taken place on the morning of the day. At times a major public or broadcast prayer service takes place after the main ceremony most recently on the next day.

== List of clergy at main ceremony ==
January 20, 1937 inaugural of Franklin D. Roosevelt

- Invocation by Chaplain ZeBarney Thorne Phillips – Episcopalian, Chaplain of the United States Senate
- Benediction by Father John A. Ryan – Catholic, professor, Catholic University of America

January 20, 1941 inaugural of Franklin D. Roosevelt

- Invocation by Chaplain ZeBarney Phillips – Episcopalian
- Benediction by Father Michael J. Ready – Catholic, general secretary of the National Catholic Welfare Conference

January 20, 1945 inaugural of Franklin D. Roosevelt

- Invocation by Bishop Angus Dun – Episcopalian, Bishop of Washington
- Benediction by Monsignor John A. Ryan – Catholic

January 20, 1949 inaugural of Harry S. Truman

- Invocation by Rev. Edward Hughes Pruden – Baptist, First Baptist Church, Washington, D.C.
- Prayer by Rabbi Samuel Thurman – Jewish, United Hebrew Congregation, St. Louis, Missouri
- Benediction by Archbishop Patrick A. O’Boyle – Catholic, Archbishop of Washington

January 20, 1953 inaugural of Dwight D. Eisenhower

- Invocation by Archbishop Patrick A. O’Boyle – Catholic, Archbishop of Washington
- Prayer by Rabbi Abba Hillel Silver – Jewish
- Prayer by President Eisenhower
- Benediction by Rev. Henry Knox Sherrill – Episcopalian, Presiding Bishop

January 21, 1957 inaugural of Dwight D. Eisenhower

- Invocation by Rev. Edward L. R. Elson – Presbyterian, Chaplain of the United States Senate
- Prayer by Archbishop Michael (Konstantinides) – Orthodox, Greek Orthodox Archdiocese of America
- Prayer by Rabbi Louis Finkelstein – Jewish
- Benediction by Cardinal Edward Mooney – Catholic, Archbishop of Detroit

January 20, 1961 inaugural of John F. Kennedy

- Invocation by Cardinal Richard Cushing – Catholic, Archbishop of Boston
- Prayer by Archbishop Iakovos (Koukouzis) – Orthodox, Greek Orthodox Archdiocese of America
- Prayer by Rev. Dr. John Barclay – Disciples of Christ, pastor of the Central Christian Church of Austin, Texas
- Benediction by Rabbi Nelson Glueck – Jewish

January 20, 1965 inaugural of Lyndon B. Johnson

- Invocation by Archbishop Robert E. Lucey – Catholic, Archbishop of San Antonio
- Prayer by Rabbi Hyman Judah Schachtel – Jewish, Congregation Beth Israel of Houston
- Prayer by Rev. Dr. George R. Davis – Disciples of Christ
- Benediction by Archbishop Iakovos (Koukouzis) – Orthodox, Greek Orthodox Archdiocese of America

January 20, 1969 inaugural of Richard Nixon

- Invocation by Rev. Charles Ewbank Tucker – African Methodist Episcopal Zion Church, bishop
- Prayer by Rabbi Edgar F. Magnin – Jewish, Wilshire Boulevard Temple, Los Angeles
- Prayer by Archbishop Iakovos (Koukouzis) – Orthodox, Greek Orthodox Archdiocese of America
- Prayer by Rev. Billy Graham – Southern Baptist, text of Billy Graham prayer 1969
- Benediction by Archbishop Terence J. Cooke – Catholic, Archbishop of New York

January 20, 1973 inaugural of Richard M. Nixon

- Invocation by Rev. E. V. Hill, National Baptist Convention, pastor of the Mount Zion Missionary Baptist Church in Los Angeles
- Prayer by Rabbi Seymour Siegel – Jewish, professor, Jewish Theological Seminary
- Prayer by Archbishop Iakovos (Koukouzis) – Orthodox, Greek Orthodox Archdiocese of America
- Benediction by Archbishop Terence J. Cooke – Catholic, Archbishop of New York

January 20, 1977 inaugural of Jimmy Carter

- Invocation by Bishop William Cannon – United Methodist
- Benediction by Archbishop John R. Roach – Catholic

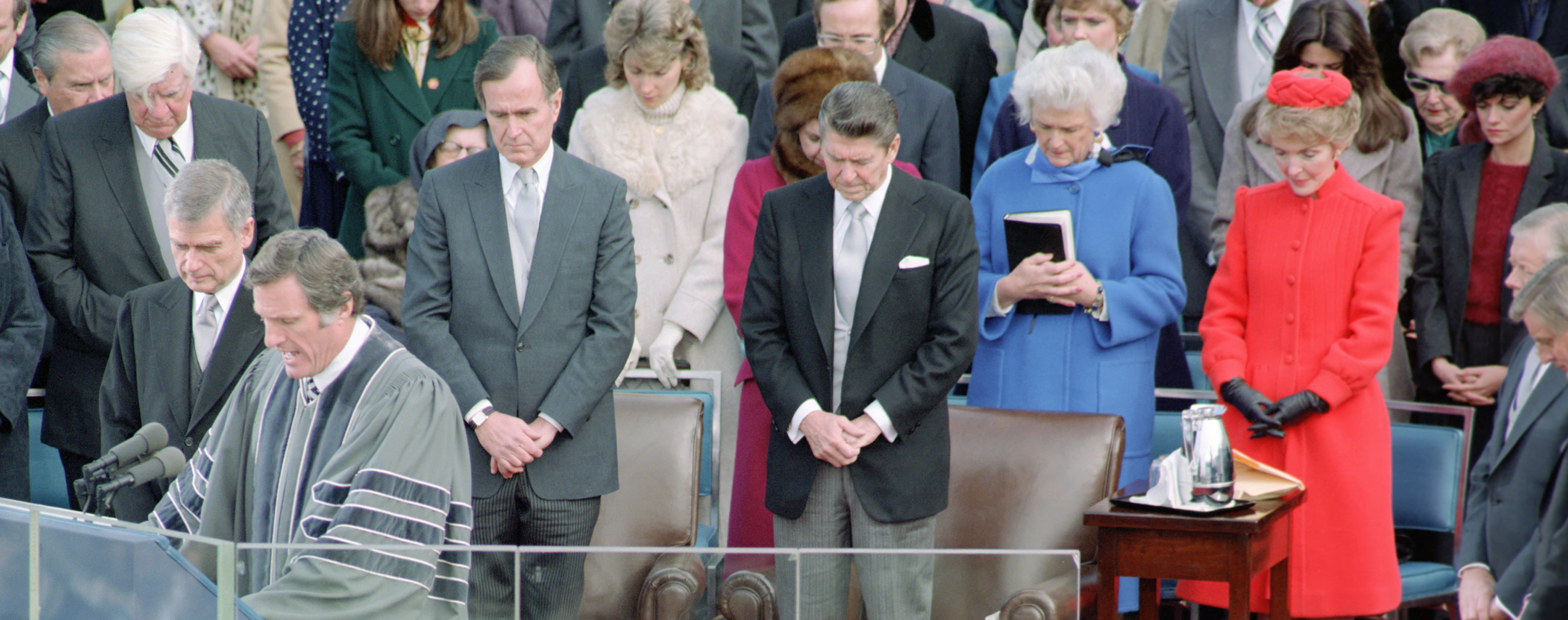
Rev. Donn Moomaw gives the invocation at the 1981 inauguration of President Ronald Reagan. Also pictured are House Speaker Tip O'Neill, Vice President George H. W. Bush, President Reagan, Barbara Bush, and Nancy Reagan.

January 20, 1981 inaugural of Ronald Reagan

- Invocation by Rev. Donn Moomaw – Presbyterian, pastor of Bel Air Presbyterian Church in Los Angeles
- Benediction by Rev. Donn Moomaw

January 21, 1985 inaugural of Ronald Reagan

- Invocation by Rev. Timothy S. Healy – Catholic, president of Georgetown University
- Prayer by Rabbi Alfred Gottschalk – Jewish, president of the Hebrew Union College
- Prayer by Rev. Donn Moomaw – Presbyterian
- Benediction by Rev. Peter Gomes – Baptist, chaplain, Harvard University

January 20, 1989 inaugural of George H. W. Bush

- Invocation by Rev. Billy Graham – Southern Baptist, text of invocation 1989
- Benediction by Rev. Billy Graham

January 20, 1993 inaugural of Bill Clinton

- Invocation by Rev. Billy Graham – Southern Baptist, text of invocation 1993
- Benediction by Rev. Billy Graham

January 20, 1997 inaugural of Bill Clinton

- Invocation by Rev. Billy Graham – Southern Baptist, text of invocation 1997
- Benediction by Rev. Gardner C. Taylor – Baptist

January 20, 2001 inaugural of George W. Bush

- Invocation by Rev. Franklin Graham – Southern Baptist, text of invocation and benediction 2001
- Benediction by Pastor Kirbyjon H. Caldwell – United Methodist

January 20, 2005 inaugural of George W. Bush

- Invocation by Rev. Luis León – Episcopalian, rector St. John's Episcopal Church, Lafayette Square, Washington, D.C.(Text of Invocation)
- Benediction by Pastor Kirbyjon Caldwell – United Methodist, Senior Pastor of Windsor Village United Methodist Church in Houston, Texas(Text of Benediction)

January 20, 2009 inaugural of Barack Obama

- Invocation by Rev. Dr. Rick Warren – Baptist, Pastor of the Saddleback Church, Lake Forest, California
- Benediction by Rev. Dr. Joseph E. Lowery – United Methodist

January 21, 2013 inaugural of Barack Obama

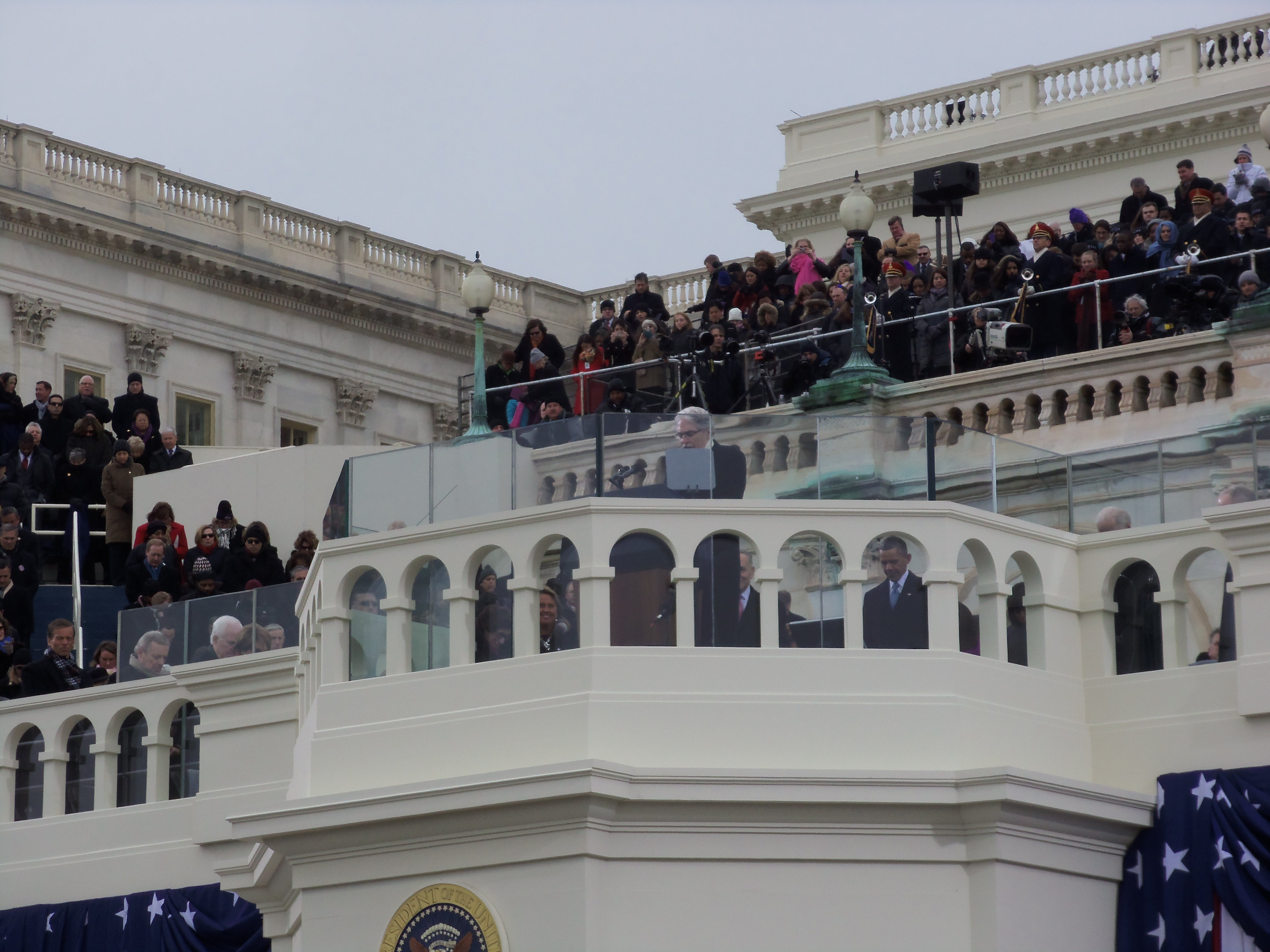
Reverend Luis Leon delivering the benediction at the 2013 presidential inauguration

- Invocation by Myrlie Evers-Williams, the first woman and non-clergy to deliver an inaugural prayer.
- Benediction by Rev. Dr. Luis León – Episcopalian, fourteenth rector of St. John's Church. Pastor Louie Giglio had originally been tapped by the inaugural committee but withdrew amid controversy regarding a sermon perceived by some as anti-gay he had delivered in the 1990s.

January 20, 2017 inauguration of Donald Trump

- Invocation by Cardinal Timothy M. Dolan – Catholic, Archbishop of New York
- Invocation by Rev. Dr. Samuel Rodriguez, president of the National Hispanic Leadership Conference
- Invocation by Pastor Paula White, Senior Pastor, New Destiny Christian Center
- Benediction by Rabbi Marvin Hier – Jewish, dean of the Simon Wiesenthal Center
- Benediction by Rev. Franklin Graham – Southern Baptist, president of Samaritan's Purse and the Billy Graham Evangelistic Association
- Benediction by Bishop Wayne T. Jackson, Great Faith Ministries International

January 20, 2021 inauguration of Joseph R. Biden Jr.

- Invocation by Rev. Leo J. O'Donovan, S.J. – Catholic, former president of Georgetown University
- Benediction by Rev. Silvester S. Beaman – African Methodist Episcopal, pastor of Bethel African Methodist Episcopal Church, Wilmington, Delaware

January 20, 2025 inauguration of Donald Trump

- Invocation by Cardinal Timothy M. Dolan – Catholic, Archbishop of New York
- Invocation by Rev. Franklin Graham – Southern Baptist, president of Samaritan's Purse and the Billy Graham Evangelistic Association
- Benediction by Rabbi Ari Berman – Jewish, president of Yeshiva University
- Benediction by Pastor Lorenzo Sewell, senior pastor of the 180 Church in Detroit
- Benediction by Rev. Frank Mann – Catholic, retired priest at St. Sebastian Roman Catholic Church in Queens, New York

== Associated morning prayer service ==
Presidents since 1933 have often worshipped privately before the inauguration ceremony.

- 1933 – Franklin Roosevelt attend a service at St. John's Episcopal Church in the morning (Saturday) before being sworn in.
- 1937 – Franklin Roosevelt attended a service at St. John's Episcopal Church in the morning (Wednesday) before being sworn in.
- 1941 – Franklin Roosevelt attended a service at St. John's Episcopal Church in the morning (Wednesday) before being sworn in.
- 1945 – Franklin Roosevelt had a private service in the White House.
- 1949 – Harry Truman attended a service at St. John's Episcopal Church in the morning (Thursday) before being sworn in.
- 1953 – Dwight Eisenhower attended a service at National Presbyterian Church in the morning (Tuesday) before being sworn in.
- 1957 – Dwight Eisenhower attended a service at National Presbyterian Church (Sunday) before being sworn in privately. He was publicly sworn in the next day.
- 1961 – John F. Kennedy attended Catholic Mass at Holy Trinity Church.
- 1965 – Lyndon Johnson attended a private service at National City Christian Church in the morning (Wednesday) before being sworn in. Billy Graham gave a sermon.
- 1969 – Richard Nixon had a prayer breakfast in the State Department
- 1973 – Richard Nixon had no prayer service. He did attend church the next day, a Sunday. There was also a White House Prayer Service with Billy Graham (sermon), Archbishop Joseph Bernardin, and Rabbi Edgar F. Magnin as speakers.
- 1977 – Jimmy Carter attended a private service at First Baptist Church
- 1981 – Ronald Reagan attended a private service at St. John's Episcopal Church. Speakers included Billy Graham.
- 1985 – Ronald Reagan attended a private service a morning prayer service at Washington National Cathedral before taking the presidential oath at the White House on Sunday, January 20. Speakers included Billy Graham. He attended a private service at St. John's Episcopal Church before his public swearing in at the Capitol on Monday, January 21.
- 1989 - George H. W. Bush attended a private service at St. John's Episcopal Church.
- 1993 - Bill Clinton attended a private service at Metropolitan AME Church
- 1997 - Bill Clinton attended a private service at Metropolitan AME Church
- 2001 – George W. Bush attended a private service at St. John's Episcopal Church on January 20
- 2009 – Barack Obama attended a private service at St. John's Episcopal Church
- 2013 – Barack Obama attended a private service at St. John's Episcopal Church on the morning of Monday, January 21, immediately before his public inaugural ceremony. (He had privately been sworn in the previous day.)
- 2017 – Donald Trump attended a private service at St. John's Episcopal Church
- 2021 – Joe Biden attended a private Mass at the Cathedral of St. Matthew the Apostle. Fr. Kevin F. O'Brien, preached and presided.
- 2025 – Donald Trump attended a private service at St. John's Episcopal Church

== Public prayer service ==
In 1789 George Washington along with Congress attended a service at St. Paul's Chapel in New York City after his swearing in. The ceremony was presided over by Bishop Samuel Provoost. No similar service is known until 1933.

Sunday, March 5, 1933 "National Inaugural Prayer Service" at Washington National Cathedral. Presided over by Episcopal Bishop James Edward Freeman of Washington.

Thursday, January 20, 1977 Jimmy Carter ordered a half-hour interfaith prayer service at the Lincoln Memorial in the morning (8am) before the inauguration ceremony; he did not attend. Speakers included

- Martin Luther King Sr., father of Martin Luther King Jr.
- Rev. Bruce Edwards, Plains, Georgia
- Ruth Carter Stapleton
- Leontyne Price and Sherrill Milnes sang

1981 Ronald Reagan had a service at National City Christian Church on Thomas Circle, Washington, D.C., but he did not attend.

Sunday, January 20, 1985 Ronald Reagan had a public service at the Washington National Cathedral. Speakers included

- Billy Graham gave a sermon

Sunday, January 22, 1989 George H. W. Bush attended a Presidential Inaugural Prayer Service at the Washington National Cathedral the day after his swearing in.

- John T. Walker, Episcopal Bishop of Washington presided
- Charles A. Perry, Cathedral Provost, officiated

Sermons were given by

- Peter Gomes, Harvard Chaplain
- John Ashcroft, governor of Missouri
- Edmond Lee Browning, presiding bishop of the Episcopal Church

Other participants included

- Rabbi Matthew H. Simon from the B’nai Israel Congregation in Rockville, Maryland, read from the Torah
- Vilma Guerrero Smith read reading part of the Forty-seventh Psalm
- Rev. Canon Carole Crumley read part of the fifth chapter of Matthew
- Cardinal James Hickey, Roman Catholic archbishop of Washington, read from the New Testament
- Iakovos, archbishop of the Greek Orthodox Archdiocese of North and South America, read from the New Testament
- George Walker Bush read a prayer
- Mrs. James A. Baker, III, honorary chairman for the National Day of Prayer and Thanksgiving, read a prayer
- Rev. Stephen E. Smallman (Vice-president Quayle's pastor) from McLean, Virginia, read from the Old Testament

Sunday, January 21, 2001 – George W. Bush had a prayer service at the National Cathedral.

- Nathan D. Baxter, dean of the Cathedral
- Jane Holmes Dixon, bishop of Washington pro tempore (Episcopalian)
- Franklin Graham gave the sermon
- Rabbi Samuel Karff from Congregation Beth Israel of Houston read Jeremiah 29:11–13 and gave one of the prayers
- Beulah “Bubba” Dailey of Austin Street Center in Dallas, read Proverbs 3:1–8
- Archbishop Demetrios of the Greek Orthodox Archdiocese of America led the people responsively in the Twenty-Third Psalm. He also gave one of the prayers.
- Mark Craig of Highland Park United Methodist Church in Dallas, read 1 John 4:7–8
- Theodore E. McCarrick, Roman Catholic archbishop of Washington, read Matthew 6:25–33 and gave one of the prayers
- Kirbyjon Caldwell of Windsor Village United Methodist Church in Houston, read the Prayer for the Nation.
- Rev. Peter Grandell, Cathedral staff
- Rev. Luis León, rector of St. John's Church, Lafayette Square, Washington, D.C.
- Rev. Suzanne Love Harris, of St. John's Episcopal Church in Jackson Hole, Wyoming
- Dr. Jack Hayford, pastor of the Church on the Way, Van Nuys, California

Friday, January 21, 2005 – George W. Bush had a service at the National Cathedral the day after the inauguration. Speakers included:

- John Bryson Chane, Bishop of Washington, Episcopalian
- A. Theodore Eastman, Vicar of Washington National Cathedral, Episcopalian
- Mark Craig, Dallas, Texas, United Methodist, gave the sermon
- Billy Graham, Charlotte, North Carolina, Southern Baptist (prayer)
- Rabbi Morton Yolkut, Philadelphia, Pennsylvania
- Bishop G. E. Patterson, Memphis, Tennessee, Church of God in Christ
- Luis Cortes, Jr., Philadelphia, Pennsylvania, Baptist
- The Metropolitan Herman Archbishop of Washington and Metropolitan of all America and Canada Orthodox Church of America, Syosset, New York
- Cardinal William Keeler, Baltimore, Maryland, Catholic
- Imam Yahya Hendi Muslim Chaplain, Georgetown University, Washington, DC (Did not participate because of illness.)
- Cardinal Theodore Edgar McCarrick, Washington, DC, Catholic
- Archbishop Demetrios Primate of the Greek Orthodox Church in America Exarch of the Ecumenical Patriarchate, New York, New York
- Kirbyjon Caldwell, Houston, Texas, United Methodist
- Canon Mary Sulerud, Washington, DC, Episcopalian

Wednesday, January 21, 2009 – Barack Obama had a service at 10am in the National Cathedral.

- Episcopal Rev. Samuel T. Lloyd III, Dean of the Washington National Cathedral – welcome
- Episcopal Diocese of Washington Bishop John Bryson Chane – invocation
- Rev. Otis Moss Jr., senior pastor emeritus at Olivet Institutional Baptist Church in Cleveland, Ohio – opening prayer
- Rev. Sharon E. Watkins, general minister and president of the Christian Church (Disciples of Christ) – sermon
- Rev. Andy Stanley, senior pastor, North Point Community Church, Alpharetta, Georgia – prayer for civil leaders

Scripture readings by

- Dr. Cynthia Hale, senior pastor, Ray of Hope Christian Church, Atlanta, Georgia
- Archbishop Demetrios, Primate of the Greek Orthodox Church in America, New York City
- Rev. Francisco González, S.F., auxiliary bishop of the Roman Catholic Diocese of Washington
- Rabbi David Saperstein, executive director of the Religious Action Center of Reform Judaism, Washington, D.C.

Responsive prayers by

- Dr. Ingrid Mattson, president, Islamic Society of North America, Hartford, Connecticut
- Rev. Suzan Johnson Cook, senior pastor, Bronx Christian Fellowship, New York City
- Rabbi Jerome Epstein, director, United Synagogue of Conservative Judaism, New York City
- Rev. Carol Wade, canon precentor of the Washington National Cathedral
- Dr. Uma Mysorekar, president, Hindu Temple Society of North America, New York City
- Rev. Jim Wallis, president, Sojourners, Washington, D.C.
- Rabbi Haskel Lookstein, Congregation Kehilath Jeshurunm, New York City
- Pastor Kirbyjon Caldwell, senior pastor, Windsor Village United Methodist Church, Houston, Texas
- Archbishop Donald Wuerl, Roman Catholic Diocese of Washington – a prayer for the nation
- Episcopal Presiding Bishop Katharine Jefferts Schori – closing prayer
- Rev. Wesley Granberg-Michaelson, general secretary of the Reformed Church in America – Benediction

Tuesday, January 22, 2013 – An interfaith National Prayer Service at 10:30 am in the National Cathedral was attended by President Obama, Vice President Biden and their spouses.

- Bishop Mariann Edgar Budde of the Episcopal Diocese of Washington and Rev. Gary Hall, dean of the Washington National Cathedral gave the welcome.
- Rev. Dr. Sharon E. Watkins, president and General Minister of the Christian Church (Disciples of Christ) gave the opening acclamation.
- Rev. Dr. Barbara Williams-Skinner, co-chair of the National African American Clergy Network gave the prayer for the day.
- Rev. Elder Nancy L. Wilson, moderator of the Metropolitan Community Church gave the first reading.
- Rabbi Julie Schonfeld, executive vice president of the Rabbinical Assembly led the reading of the psalm.
- Cantor Mikhail Manevich of the Washington Hebrew Congregation gave the invitation to prayer.
- Rev. Dr. Leith Anderson, president of the National Association of Evangelicals, Kathryn Lohre, president of the National Council of Churches, and Imam Mohamed Magid, president of the Islamic Society of North America together gave the prayer for those who govern.
- Cardinal Donald Wuerl of the Roman Catholic Archdiocese of Washington led the second reading.
- Abdullah M. Khouj, president and imam of the Islamic Center of Washington, gave a traditional Islamic call to prayer.
- Sapreet Kaur, national executive director of the Sikh Coalition, Rev. Charles Jenkins II, senior pastor of Fellowship Missionary Baptist Church in Chicago, and Dr. Stephen F. Schneck, of the Catholic University of America led the prayer for those who serve.
- Rev. Gabriel Salguero, president of the National Latino Evangelical Coalition led the third reading.
- Allison Mondel, cantor of Washington National Cathedral, gave an invitation to prayer.
- Rabbi Sharon Brous of IKAR Jewish Community, Rev. Dr. Serene Jones of Union Theological Seminary (New York), and Archbishop Demetrios of America, primate of the Greek Orthodox Church in America gave the prayers for the people.
- Dr. Wintley Phipps of the Dream Academy gave the anthem.
- Presiding Bishop Katharine Jefferts Schori of the Episcopal Church gave the prayer for the nation.
- Rev. Kirbyjon Caldwell of Windsor Village United Methodist Church led the Lord's Prayer.
- Rev. Dr. Raphael Warnock of Ebenezer Baptist Church gave the benediction.

Saturday, January 21, 2017 – An interfaith National Prayer Service in Washington National Cathedral was attended by President Trump, Vice President Pence, and their spouses.

- Carlyle Begay of the Navajo offered the invocation.
- Bishop Mariann Edgar Budde of the Episcopal Diocese of Washington gave the welcome.
- Bishop James B. Magness, bishop suffragan for Armed Forces and Federal Ministries of the Episcopal Church led the opening acclamation.
- Dean Randolph Marshall Hollerith of Washington National Cathedral led the opening prayer.
- Mikhail Manevich of Washington Hebrew Congregation gave a Jewish call to prayer.
- Rabbi Fred Raskind of Temple Bet Yam, St. Augustine, Florida, read the first reading.
- Evangelist Alveda King, Director of Civil Rights for the Unborn, Priests for Life; Bishop Harry R. Jackson, Jr., Hope Christian Church, Beltsville, Maryland; and Narayanachar Digalakote, Senior Priest, Sri Siva Vishnu Temple, Lanham, Maryland, led prayers for those who govern.
- Elder D. Todd Christofferson, Quorum of the Twelve Apostles, The Church of Jesus Christ of Latter-Day Saints, led a prayer for civil leaders.
- Imam Mohamed Magid, Executive Imam, ADAMS Center, Sterling, Virginia, gave the Muslim call to prayer.
- Sajid Tarar, Advisor, Medina Masjid, Baltimore, Maryland, read the second reading.
- Pastor Greg Laurie, Senior Pastor, Harvest Christian Fellowship, Riverside & Irvine, California, and Dr. Jack Graham, Pastor, Prestonwood Baptist Church, Plano, Texas, led prayers for those who serve.
- Archbishop Demetrios of America, Primate of the Greek Orthodox Archdiocese of America led a prayer for service to others.
- Canon Rosemarie Logan Duncan of the Washington National Cathedral gave the Christian call to prayer.
- Dr. David Jeremiah, Senior Pastor, Shadow Mountain Community Church, El Cajon, California read the third reading.
- Dr. Ronnie W. Floyd, Senior Pastor, Cross Church, Arkansas, read Psalm 23.
- Dr. David D. Swanson, Senior Pastor, First Presbyterian Church, Orlando, Florida, read the fourth reading.
- Jesse Singh, chairman, Sikhs of America; Minister Ian McIlraith, Director of Youth Programs, Soka Gakkai International-USA, Santa Monica, California; and Anthony Vance, Director of Public Affairs, United States Baha’i Community, led prayers for the people.
- Cissie Graham Lynch, Samaritan's Purse, lead a prayer for peace.
- Pastor Ramiro Peña, Senior Pastor, Christ the King Baptist Church, Waco, Texas, led the Lord's Prayer.
- Cardinal Donald Wuerl, archbishop of Washington, Roman Catholic Church, led a prayer for our country.
- Bishop Magness offered the closing prayer.
- Bishop Budde gave the blessing.
- Rev. Darrell Scott, Senior Pastor, New Spirit Revival Center, Cleveland Heights, Ohio, gave the dismissal.

Thursday, January 21, 2021 – Virtual Presidential Inaugural Prayer Service hosted by Washington National Cathedral at 10 a.m.

The Rev. Dr. William J. Barber, II co-chair, Poor People's Campaign, preached. Other participants included:

- The Most Rev. Michael Bruce Curry, Presiding Bishop and Primate, The Episcopal Church
- The Right Rev. Mariann Edgar Budde, Diocesan Bishop, Episcopal Diocese of Washington
- The Very Rev. Randolph Marshall Hollerith, Dean, Washington National Cathedral
- Archbishop Elpidophoros, Primate of the Greek Orthodox Archdiocese of America
- Rabbi Sharon Kleinbaum, Senior Rabbi, Congregation Beit Simchat Torah
- Rabbi Sharon Brous, Senior Rabbi, IKAR
- Jonathan Nez, President, Navajo Nation
- Phefelia Nez, First Lady, Navajo Nation
- The Rev. Jim Wallis, Founder and Ambassador of Sojourners
- Sr. Carol Keehan, Former President and CEO, Catholic Health Association
- The Rev. Dr. Otis Moss III, Senior Pastor, Trinity United Church of Christ
- Dr. Debbie Almontaser, Senior Advisor, Emgage NY and President, Muslim Community Network
- Imam Azhar Subedar, Imam, IACC
- The Rev. Dr. Alexia Salvatierra, Assistant Professor of Mission and Global Transformation, Fuller Theological Seminary
- Barbara Satin, Faith Work Director, The National LGBTQ Task Force
- Anuttama Dasa, Global Minister of Communications, International Society for Krishna Consciousness (ISKCON)
- Valarie Kaur, Sikh American Activist, Author of “See No Stranger”
- The Rev. Dr. Gregory Knox Jones, Senior Pastor, Westminster Presbyterian Church
- Bishop Vashti McKenzie, African Methodist Episcopal Church
- The Rev. Dr. Paula Stone Williams, Author and Pastor, Left Hand Church
- The Rev. Fred Davie, Executive Vice President, Union Theological Seminary
- The Rev. Robert W. Fisher, Rector, St. John's, Lafayette Square
- The Rev. Dr. Yvette Flunder, Presiding Bishop, The Fellowship of Affirming Ministries
- Emma Petty Addams, executive director, Mormon Women for Ethical Government
- The Rev. Dr. Cynthia L. Hale, Senior Pastor, Ray of Hope Christian Church
- The Rev. Dr. Jeffrey Kuan, President, Claremont School of Theology
- First Lady Robin Jackson, Brookland Baptist Church
- The Rev. Dr. Jacqui Lewis, Senior Minister, Middle Collegiate Church
- The Revd. Canon Rosemarie Logan Duncan, Canon for Worship, Washington National Cathedral
- The Rev. Robert W. Lee, Pastor, Unifour Church
- Sr. Norma Pimentel, executive director, Catholic Charities of the Rio Grande Valley
- Jen Hatmaker, NYT Bestselling Author, Podcast Host, and Speaker

Tuesday, January 21, 2025 – An interfaith Service of Prayer for the Nation in Washington National Cathedral was attended by President Trump, Vice President Vance, and their families.
