= Ronald H. Haines =

American bishop of Washington, D.C. diocese

The Right Reverend Ronald Hayward Haines
- Bishop of Washington
- Church: Episcopal Church
- Diocese: Washington
- Elected: June 30, 1990
- In office: 1990–2000
- Predecessor: John T. Walker
- Successor: John Bryson Chane
- Previous post: Suffragan Bishop of Washington (1986-1990)

Orders
- Ordination: June 1967 by Jonathan G. Sherman
- Consecration: October 29, 1986 by Edmond L. Browning

Personal details
- Born: August 14, 1934 Wilmington, Delaware, United States
- Died: March 21, 2008 (aged 73) Lancaster, Pennsylvania, United States
- Buried: Washington National Cathedral
- Denomination: Anglican
- Spouse: Mary T. Ferrell
- Children: 6

Ronald Hayward Haines (April 14, 1934 – March 21, 2008) was bishop of the Episcopal Diocese of Washington from 1990 to 2000.

== Early life and education ==
Haines was born on April 14, 1934, in Wilmington, Delaware, and grew up in New Castle, Delaware. He graduated with a Bachelor of Science in engineering from the University of Delaware in 1956. He later worked as an engineer with the old Reynolds Metal Co. in Richmond, Virginia. In 1962 he joined another metals engineering firm in New York City. After growing interest in the ordained ministry, Haines enrolled in the George Mercer, Jr. Memorial School of Theology. He also earned a Master of Divinity in 1967 and a Master of Sacred Theology in 1978, both from the General Theological Seminary.

== Ordination ==
Haines was ordained deacon in June 1966 and priest in June 1967 by Bishop Jonathan G. Sherman. He was first assigned to the Church of St Paul in the Bronx, New York from 1967 until 1968, after which he became rector the Church of St Francis in Rutherfordton, North Carolina. In 1981 he became the deputy of the Bishop of Western North Carolina.

== Bishop ==
In 1986, Haines was elected Suffragan Bishop of Washington. He was consecrated on October 29, 1986, with Presiding Bishop Edmond L. Browning as chief consecrator. After the death of Bishop John T. Walker in 1989, Haines served as Pro tempore bishop until a successor was elected. He himself was elected on June 30, 1990. He was installed as diocesan bishop on November 15, 1990. Among his many achievements as Bishop of Washington, Haines is mostly remembered for ordaining the Reverend Elizabeth L. Carl, an openly lesbian woman, to the priesthood on June 5, 1991. He was vocal regarding inclusion of sexual minorities and was a critic of racism, describing it as one of the greatest sins of modern America. He was also the first bishop to nominate a woman, the Reverend Jane Dixon, to serve as Suffragan Bishop of Washington; she was the second woman to be consecrated a Bishop in the Episcopal Church. Haines retired on December 31, 2000. He died on March 21, 2008, in Lancaster, Pennsylvania.

== Personal life ==
Haines married Mary T. Terrell in 1957 and together they had six children.

Episcopal Church (USA) titles
| Preceded by John T. Walker | Bishop of the Episcopal Diocese of Washington; 1990-2000 | Succeeded by John Bryson Chane |
