= Church of St. Paul's, K Street (Washington, D.C.) =

St. Paul's Parish, K Street
- St. Paul's Episcopal Church
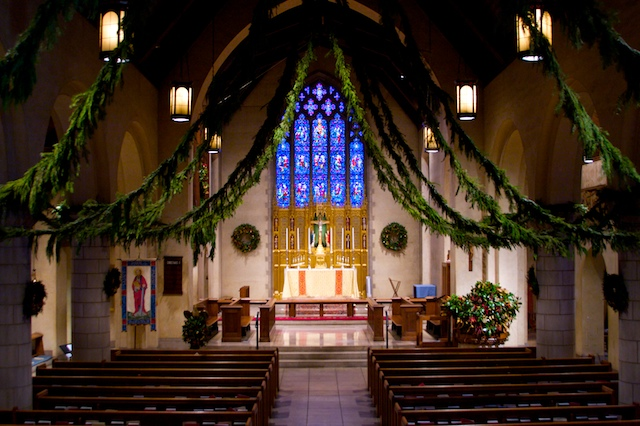
- St. Paul's Parish, K Street
- 38.9023°N 77.0528°W
- Location: 2430 K Street NW, Washington, D.C.
- Country: United States
- Denomination: Episcopal Church
- Churchmanship: Anglo-Catholic
- Website: saintpaulskstreet.org

History
- Dedication: St. Paul the Apostle

Architecture
- Functional status: Active
- Architect: Philip H. Frohman
- Style: Late Gothic Revival
- Completed: 1948

Administration
- Province: Province of Washington
- Diocese: Diocese of Washington
- Deanery: Central District of Columbia

Clergy
- Rector: The Rev'd Richard Wall

St. Paul's Parish, K Street is a parish of The Episcopal Church in the Episcopal Diocese of Washington. It is known for being one of the earlier Anglo-Catholic churches in the United States and remains one to this day. The church reported 750 members in 2015 and 785 members in 2023; no membership statistics were reported in 2024 parochial reports. Plate and pledge income reported for the congregation in 2024 was $686,692. Average Sunday attendance (ASA) in 2024 was 166 persons. This was a relative decrease on ASA of 309 reported in 2015.

== History ==
After the establishment of a Mission in Autumn 1866, in February 1867 an application was filed with the Episcopal Diocese of Maryland to organize a new parish from the metes and bounds of St. John's Parish, Lafayette Square. This was granted on 30 May 1867 by the Diocese's 84th Convention. The boundaries were defined by the Potomac River and 24th Street, running north to H Street, east on H Street to 22nd Street to the city boundary (Boundary Road, today called Florida Avenue).

In June 1867, a lot was purchased on 23rd Street near Washington Circle, and Emlen T. Littell was selected to design the church to be built. In June 1868, the building was completed. An expansion occurred in Spring 1883 so that the church could seat up to 650 people. A second phase of expansion in October 1891 brought a new single stone porch, a vestibule, and an enlarged chancel. With the mortgage debt being paid off in December 1892, the church was cleared for consecration, which occurred on 25 January 1893, the Feast of the Conversion of St. Paul the Apostle. In June 1898, the third phase of construction took place with the chancel being enlarged, a baptistry and a chapel being built, and Altar steps and a reredos being installed.

In May 1913, the dedication of a cloister marked the completion of the Church and the Parish House building complex. In February 1922, the parish merged with the parish of St. Michael and All Angels. In 1935, women received the right to vote in parish elections. Following plans to build a new hospital for the George Washington University that would take up the block on which the church was located, the U.S. Federal Government forcibly bought the church's property, and the building was closed at the end of 1944. The last service in the "old" (i.e., original) church was held on 1 January 1945, and the church was deconsecrated the following day by the Rt Rev'd Angus Dun, IV Bishop of Washington.

The architect Philip H. Frohman was engaged to design a new building at the new property the church purchased on K Street. During a prolonged period of construction, the parish worshipped at St. Thomas' Church near Dupont Circle. The first service in the "new" church was held in June 1948, and the service of the Dedication of a Church was solemnly celebrated on 18 July 1948. Numerous additions of stained glass windows and appropriate religious adornments were added in the following years. In 1966, St. Paul's celebrated its centenary. On 5 October 2008, the newly expanded parish hall (dating back to 1958) was dedicated by the VIII Bishop of Washington, the Rt Rev'd John Chane. The new parish house incorporated the Gray and Carwithen townhouses that were adjacent to the church.

St. Paul's sister parish is St Paul's Church, Knightsbridge in London.

== Traditions ==
Weekly celebrations of the Holy Communion began in 1868 and continued up through 1893, after which they became daily. The parish was the first Episcopal parish in the city of Washington to use altar candles. By 1870, Morning and Evening Prayer were both being recited daily in Advent and Lent, and Evening Prayer was recited daily throughout the year, except for two months in summer. The Christmas Midnight Mass of 1870 was perhaps the first in the United States in an Episcopal church. The parish's first written record of the Reservation of the Blessed Sacrament dates from November 1912, but the practice may date back to 1893 when the tabernacle was donated and built into the High Altar. The parish was the first Episcopal parish in the city of Washington that did not charge pew rents and was also one of the first parishes to use envelopes for offerings.

By 1935, the service of Evensong and Benediction of the Blessed Sacrament ("E&B") was being offered on Sunday weekly, a practice that continued until 2019. Following the COVID-19 pandemic, E&B was revived and has since been offered on the second and fourth Sundays of each month from the end of September through Corpus Christi, as well as on every Sunday during the season of Advent. All Masses and other services are offered facing liturgical east. On Saturdays, the traditional Holy Rosary is prayed and Low Mass is offered according to The English Missal, the Anglo-Catholic English form of the Tridentine Mass. The parish remains active in various Anglo-Catholic devotional societies: wards of the Confraternity of the Blessed Sacrament (American Province) and of the Society of Mary (American Region), and a branch of the Guild of All Souls (US), have been long-established at St. Paul's.

== Music ==
The church is known for its music program. The parish's first organist, John F. Franklin, began training a vested boys' choir as early as in spring 1869. In January 1911, the first Organ Recital Series in the city was launched at St. Paul's. The first recording of the Men and Boys' Choir appeared as early as 1954, an Evensong service sung on WGMS radio. In 1980, the Men and Boys Choir was discontinued. In 1993, the chorister program was revised with an additional girls choir, which sang at the Sunday 9 a.m. Mass. For many years, the boy and girl choristers sung E&B weekly on Sunday afternoon, together with a group of tenors and basses. In summer 2023, the chorister program went on hiatus, and an Evensong Choir subsequently took form.

The Parish Choir, a mixed adult choir with a professional core, sings the 10:30 a.m. Solemn Mass on Sundays and various feast days and special liturgies. A choral setting of the Mass ordinary, psalm, and Gregorian propers, as well as anthems or motets, are customarily offered at every Solemn Mass. E&B is likewise sung fully by the Evensong Choir. Lessons & Carols, followed by Benediction, are sung twice in Advent by the Parish Choir. St. Paul's was the first parish in the Diocese of Washington to offer a service of Advent Lessons and Carols.

The parish's Directors of Music include Samuel Abner Leech (1921-1947), Russell H. Hinds (1947-1950), E. Douglas Birchby (1950-1978), Paul Callaway (1979-1985), Joseph Marcus Ritchie (1986-1989), William Mark Conrad (1990-1991), Jeffrey Smith (1992-2004; 2017-2022), Mark Dwyer (2004-2007), and Robert McCormick (2007-2016). In July 2022, Monica Czausz Berney was named Interim Director of Music. In July 2023, she was named Director of Music. Her resignation, in order to attend to the needs of her family, was announced in November 2025. It took effect on 7 January 2026. After Michael Fili, the parish's composer-in-residence, and Isabella Isza Wu had taken over the responsibility for the music program ad interim, it was announced in April 2026 that the parish would make the two part-time positions permanent. Michael Fili will be serving as Director of Music and Choirmaster (effective June 1, 2026) and Isza Wu as Assistant Director of Music and Organist (effective July 1, 2026).

== Rectors ==
Following the retirement of the Rev'd Andrew L. Sloane in January 2013, the Rt Rev'd James Jelinek, VIII Bishop of Minnesota, was named interim rector. In May 2015, the vestry of St. Paul's announced the election of the Rev'd Richard David Wall as the tenth rector.

	Rector	Years as Rector
1.	Augustus Jackson	1866–1880
2.	William Barker (bishop)	1881–1887
3.	Alfred Harding (bishop)	1887–1907
4.	Robert Talbot	1909–1923
5.	Arlington A. McCallum	1924–1949
6.	James Richards	1949–1973
7.	James R. Daughtry	1974–1989
8.	Richard Cornish Martin	1989–1996
9.	Andrew L. Sloane	1998–2013
10.	Richard D. Wall	2015–present

== Pipe organs ==
The organ for the "first" church was installed by Roper & Co. from Boston in July 1868. In June 1901, a new three-manual organ by Lyon & Healy was dedicated in memory of John P. Franklin, the parish's first organist and choirmaster. This instrument was renovated in 1919, 1930, and after relocation to the new church, in 1949.

A new organ of 51 stops and 64 ranks was built in 1996 by American organ builder Schoenstein & Co. The first instrument built by Schoenstein in the Mid-Atlantic region, the organ at St. Paul's is a standard-bearer of the American symphonic style and is particularly notable for its "double expression." Two separate enclosed divisions called Celestial and Ethereal are located within the Swell division, which is enclosed itself. The organ has four expression shoes, one for the Choir Division, one for the Swell Division, one for the Double Expression Divisions (Celestial/Ethereal, called "Utility") and one for the Solo Division. In 2005, a Tuba Mirabilis was added, the pipes of which are located on cabinetry installed on the church's rear wall. In summer 2023, new memory levels were added, and the toe studs on the pedal board were re-assigned.

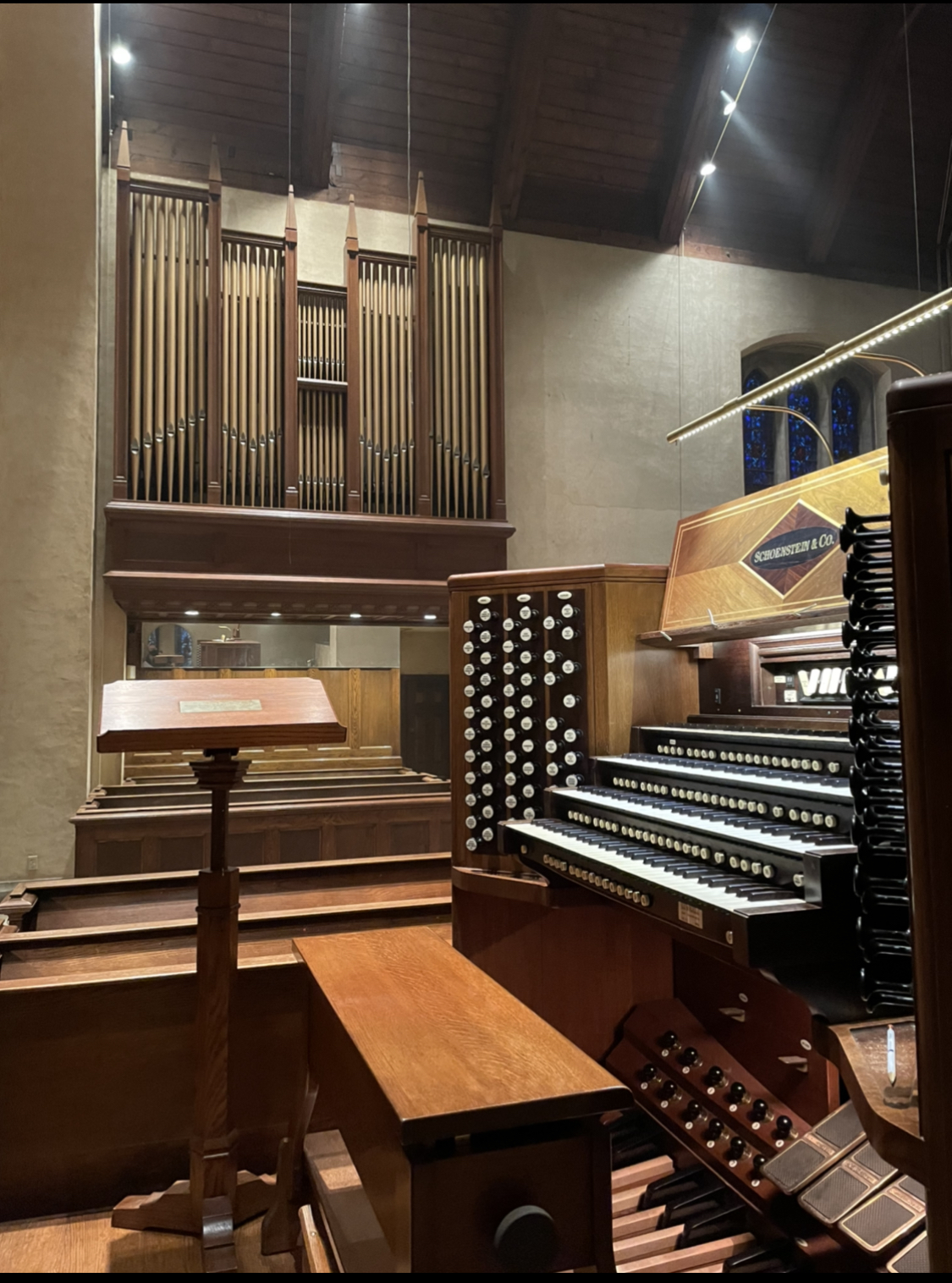
Organ case and console in the sanctuary

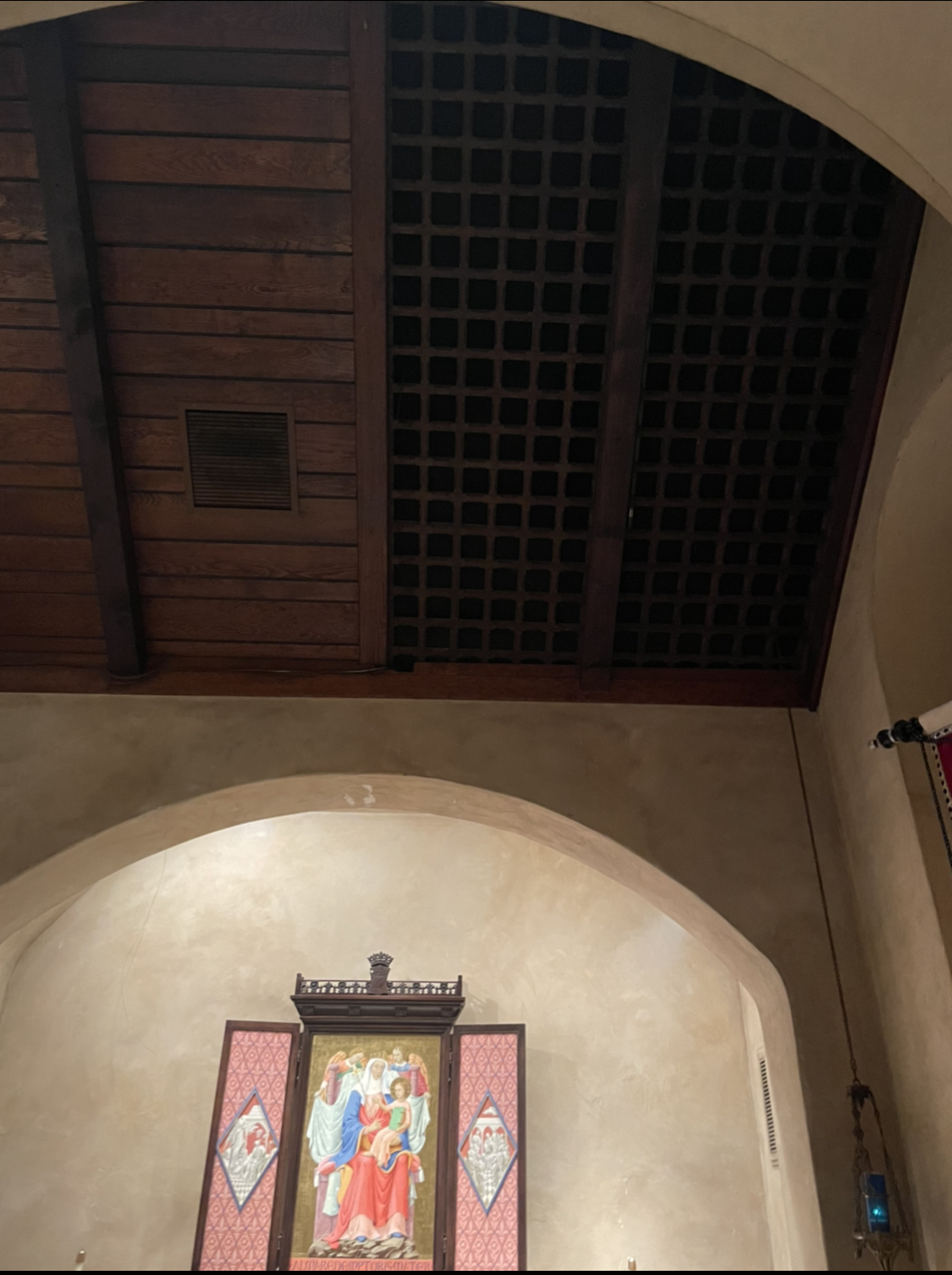
Sound outlet of the choir division above the Lady Altar

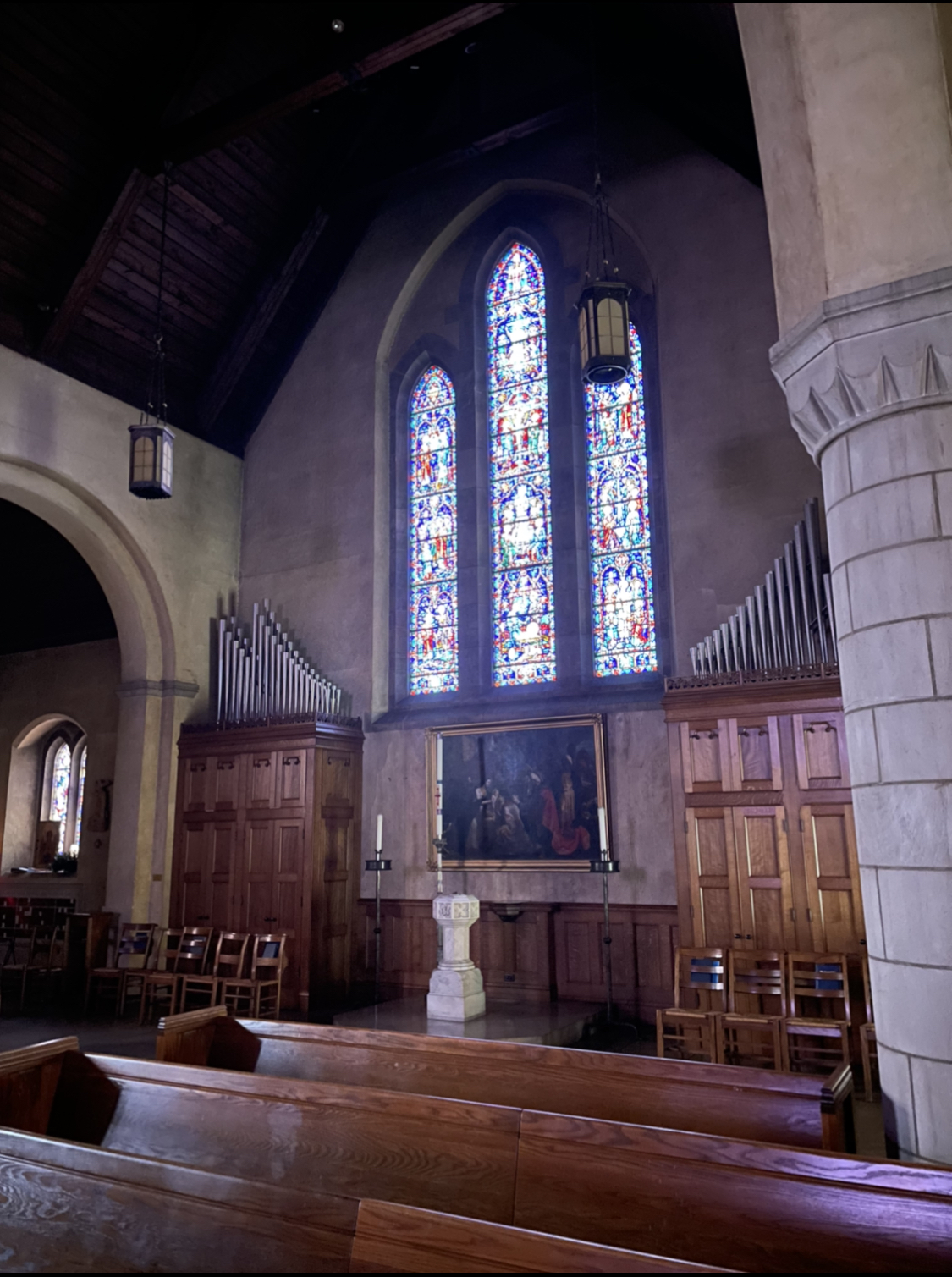
Tuba mirabilis at the Church's rear wall

== Gallery ==
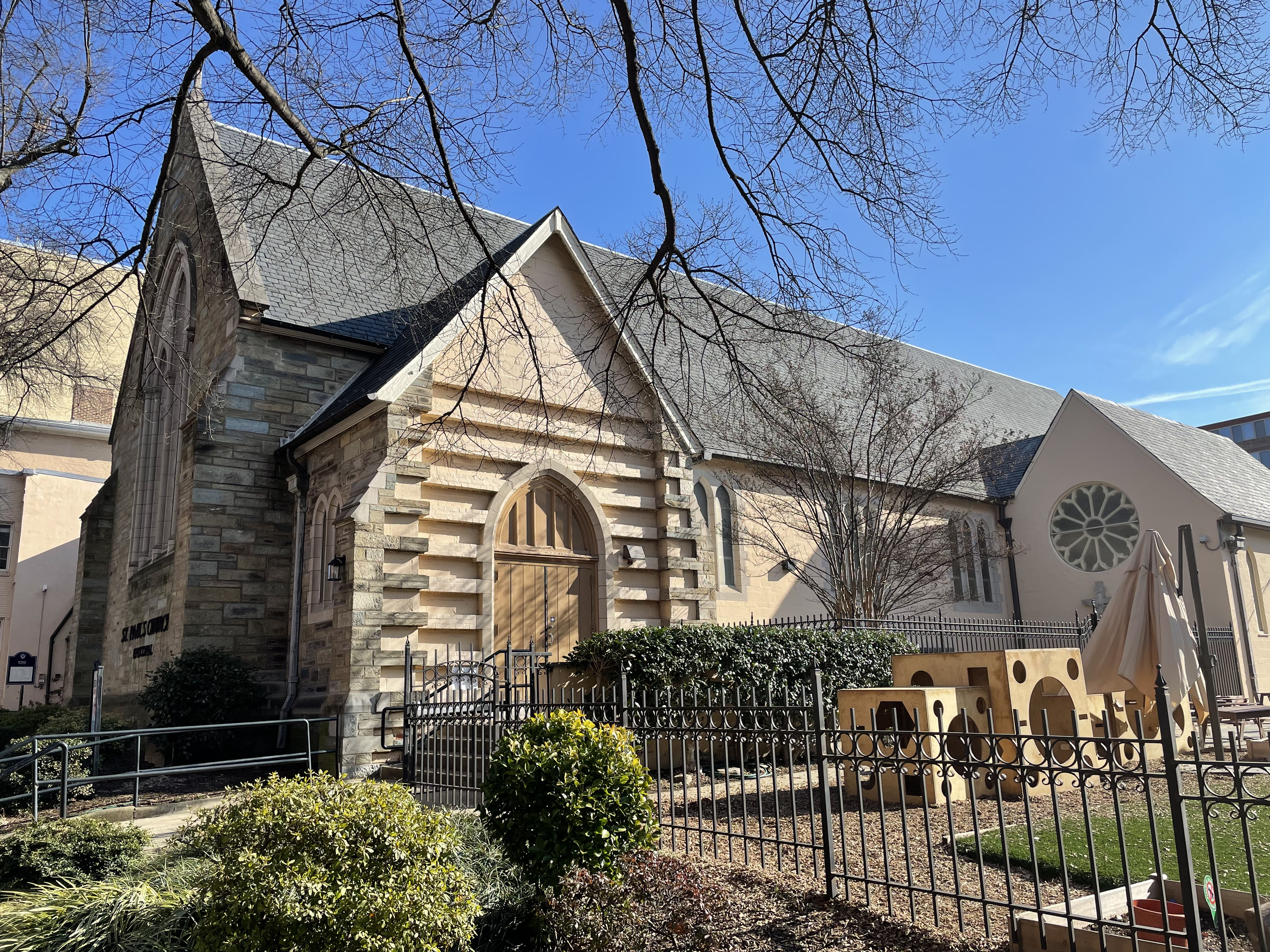
Exterior view from side

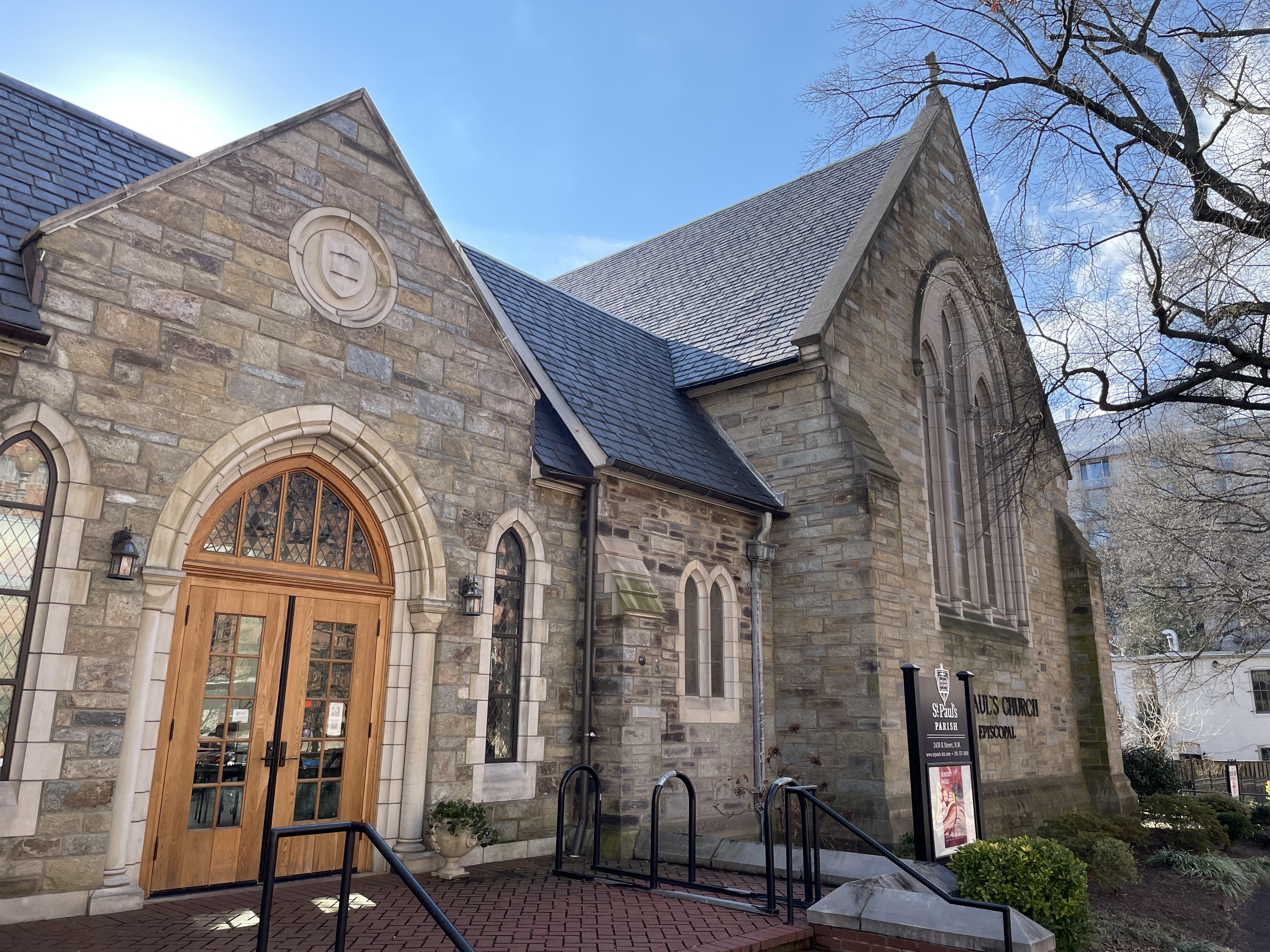
Exterior view from K St NW

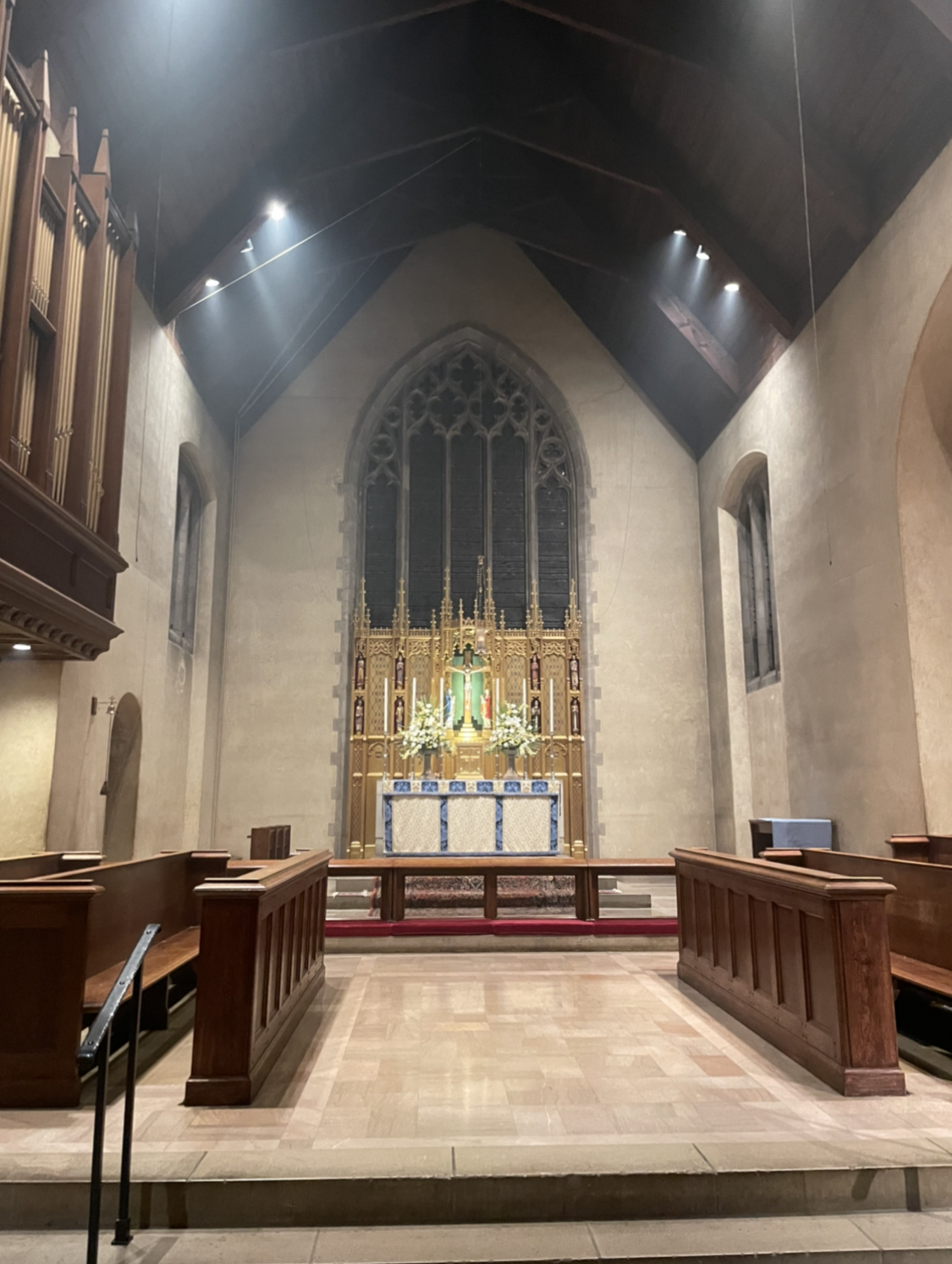
View towards the High Altar

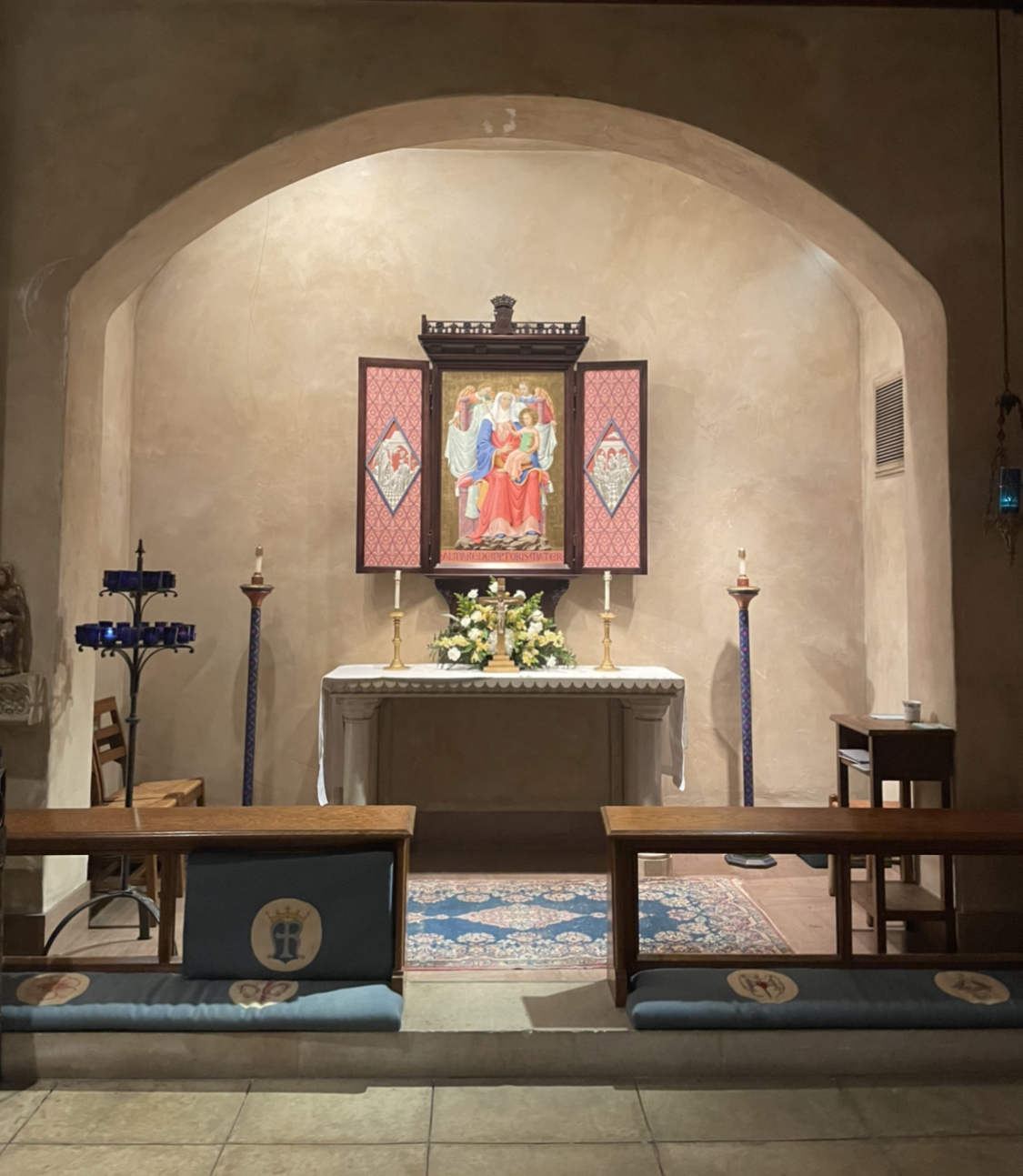
the Lady Altar

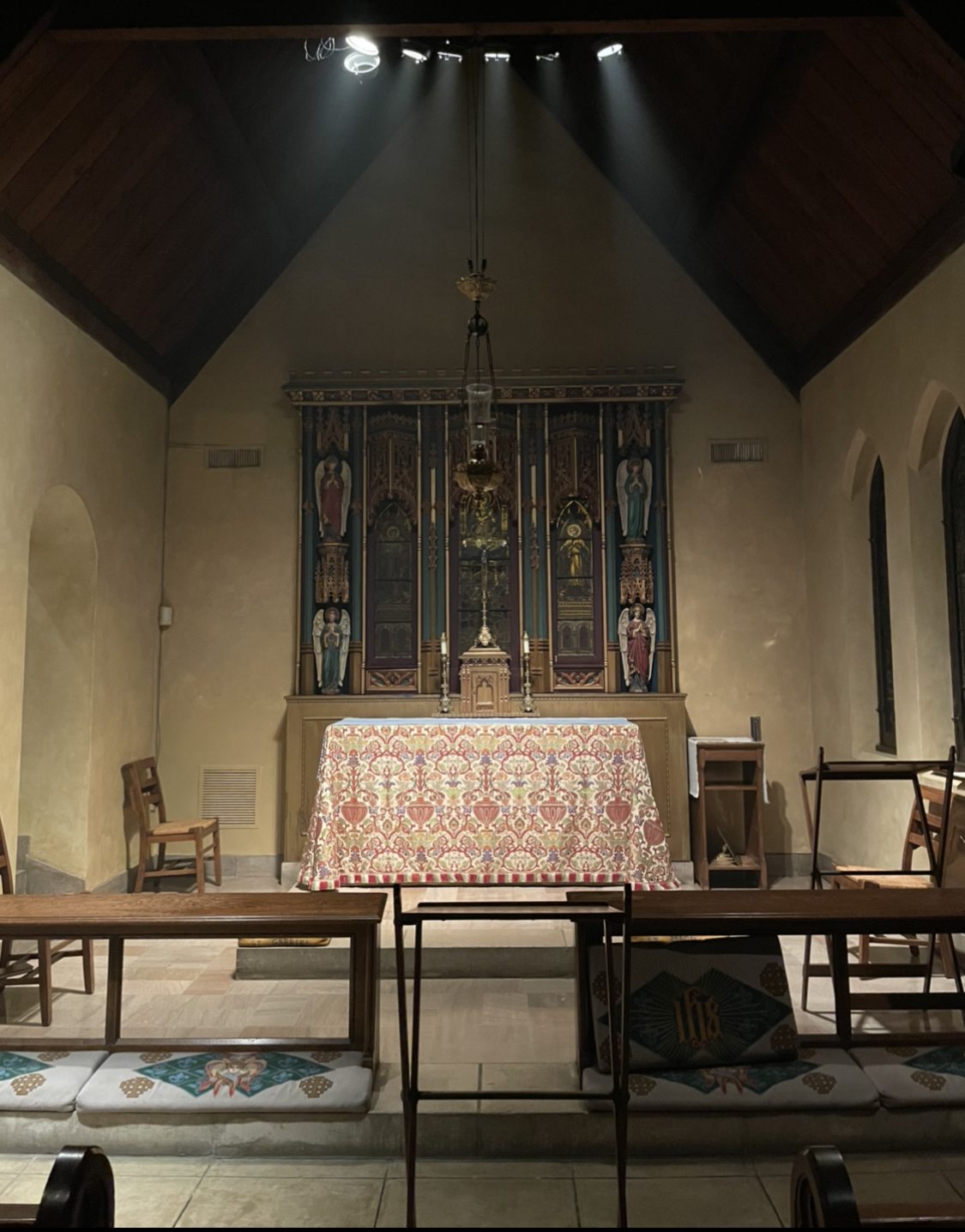
the Angel Chapel

== See also ==
- List of Anglo-Catholic churches
- Anglo-Catholicism
- English Missal
- Anglo-Catholic societies
- List of Anglican devotional societies
