= BWD (disambiguation) =

BWD could refer to:

- Barrels of water per day
- Bird Watcher's Digest, an American birding magazine
- Bishop Walker Dinner, an event and humanitarian award

== Transport codes ==
- Belvandi railway station, India
- Birchwood railway station, Cheshire, England
- Brownwood Regional Airport, Texas, U.S. (IATA code)
- Burwood railway station, Melbourne, Victoria, Australia
