= Mariann Budde =

American Episcopal bishop (born 1959)

The Right Reverend Mariann Budde
- Bishop of Washington
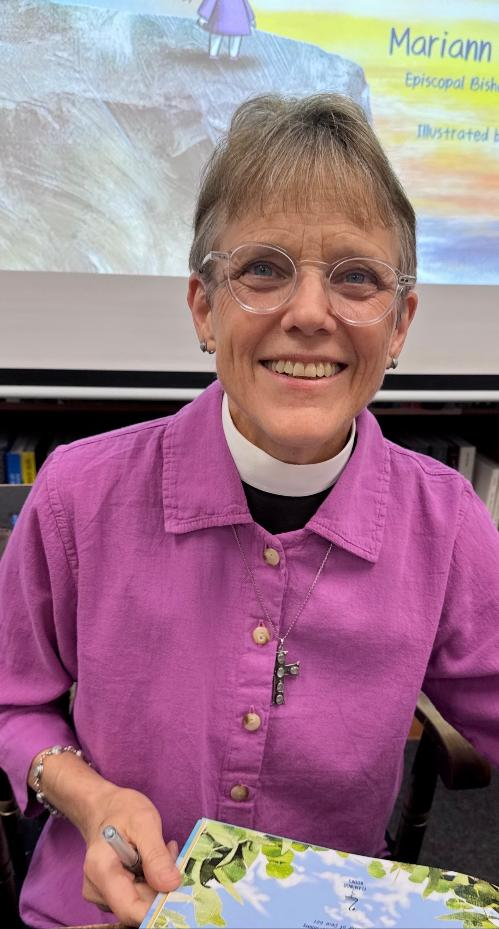
- Budde in 2026
- Church: Episcopal Church
- Diocese: Washington
- Elected: June 18, 2011
- In office: 2011–2028 (tentative)
- Predecessor: John Bryson Chane

Orders
- Ordination: May 28, 1988 (deacon); March 4, 1989 (priest)
- Consecration: November 12, 2011 by Katharine Jefferts Schori

Personal details
- Born: Mariann Edgar; 1959 (age 66–67) Summit, New Jersey, U.S.
- Denomination: Episcopal Church
- Spouse: Paul Budde (m. 1986)
- Children: 2
- Education: University of Rochester (BA); Virginia Theological Seminary (MDiv, DMin)

Mariann Edgar Budde (/ˈbʌdi/; née Edgar; born 1959) is an American Episcopal prelate who has served as Bishop of Washington since 2011. She is the first woman elected to the position of bishop in the diocese, although Bishop Jane Holmes Dixon was elected as suffragan bishop in the diocese in 1992 and served as bishop pro tempore after Bishop Haines retired and before Bishop Chane - Budde's predecessor - was elected.

Budde was ordained as a deacon in 1988 and as a priest in 1989. She served as rector of St. John's Episcopal Church in Minneapolis, Minnesota, from 1993 until she became the bishop of Washington in 2011. In 2017, she oversaw the removal of Washington National Cathedral's stained-glass windows honoring Confederate generals, which were replaced in 2023 with windows representing the civil rights movement. In 2018, she presided over the interment of the ashes of Matthew Shepard, a murdered gay man, at the cathedral.

Budde delivered a benediction at the 2020 Democratic National Convention. She delivered the homily at the January 2025 interfaith prayer service following Donald Trump's second presidential inauguration. Her sermon called for compassion and mercy toward marginalized groups. Trump and some of his supporters criticized her remarks, while other public figures and faith leaders praised her message.

On October 1, 2026, she announced her planned retirement as Bishop of Washington after the election of her successor in 2028.

== Early life and education ==
Mariann Edgar was born in 1959 in Summit, New Jersey, to a Swedish-American mother, Ann Björkman, and an American father, William Edgar. She grew up in the Flanders section of Mount Olive Township, New Jersey, and lived with her father for a time in Colorado, following her parents' divorce, before returning to New Jersey and graduating from West Morris Mount Olive High School.

She completed her undergraduate work at the University of Rochester in 1982, earning a Bachelor of Arts degree in history, magna cum laude. She received her Master of Divinity (1989) and Doctor of Ministry (2008) degrees from the Virginia Theological Seminary.

Edgar married Paul Budde in 1986, upon which she took the name Mariann Edgar Budde. They have two sons.

== Career ==
Budde worked in urban ministry in Arizona and then as a missionary in Honduras before joining the clergy. She was accepted as a postulant in the Episcopal Church at the age of 24. She was ordained as a deacon on May 28, 1988, and as a priest on March 4, 1989. Her first position after seminary was as assistant rector at Trinity Episcopal Church in Toledo, Ohio. She became rector of St. John's Episcopal Church in Minneapolis, Minnesota, in 1993, and served 18 years in that position. Budde has frequently cited the miracle of the loaves and fish as the foundation of her ministry.

=== Episcopacy ===
Budde was elected the ninth bishop of Washington on June 18, 2011, at a special convention at Washington National Cathedral to replace the retiring bishop, John Bryson Chane. She was consecrated at the cathedral on November 12 of that year, becoming Washington's first woman elected to the position of diocesan bishop. Her principal consecrator was the presiding bishop, Katharine Jefferts Schori, with bishops Brian Prior, Mark M. Beckwith, John Bryson Chane, and Mary Glasspool as co-consecrators. The next day, a Sunday, she preached her first sermon at the National Cathedral at a service attended by 2,000 people. That weekend also marked the first services at the cathedral since the August 23, 2011, earthquake damaged the cathedral.

As bishop, Budde heads the Episcopal Diocese of Washington, which comprises 86 Episcopal congregations and 10 Episcopal schools across the District of Columbia and in four Maryland counties: Montgomery, Prince George's, Charles, and St. Mary's. She also serves as chair of the Protestant Episcopal Cathedral Foundation, and as an ex officio member of the Governing Board of the National Cathedral School.

==== Advocacy and initiatives ====
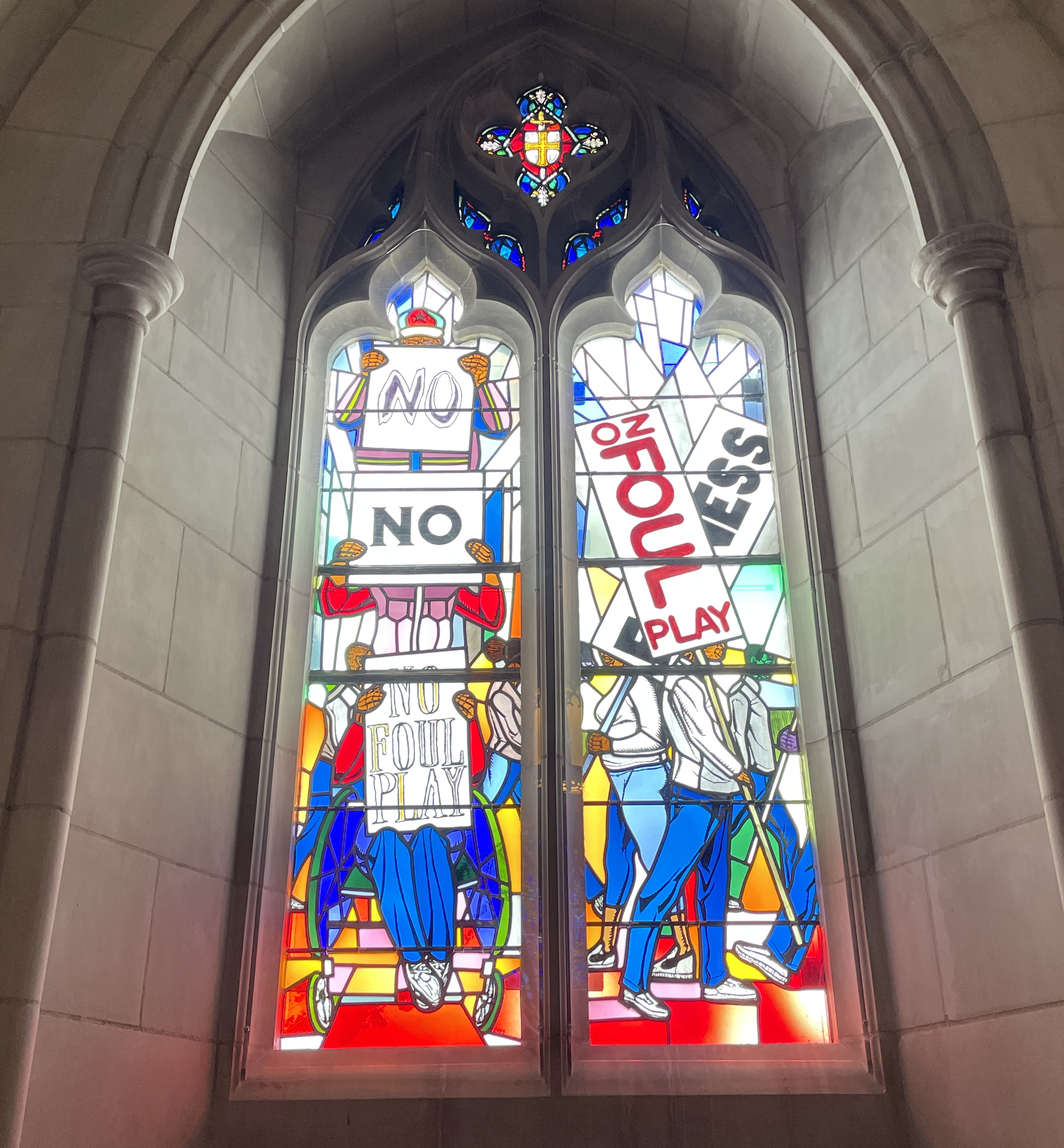
Budde oversaw the replacement of panes honoring Confederate generals with these panes, which commemorate the civil rights movement.

Budde oversaw the 2017 removal of the Washington National Cathedral's stained-glass panes honoring Confederate generals Robert E. Lee and Stonewall Jackson. In place of the old windows (donated in 1953 by the United Daughters of the Confederacy), new windows depicting the struggle for African Americans' civil rights (entitled Now and Forever and executed by Kerry James Marshall) were installed in 2023. In October 2018, Budde and Gene Robinson, the first openly gay Episcopal bishop, presided over the interment service of the ashes of Matthew Shepard, a gay man murdered in 1998. Shepard's parents had hesitated for years to bury Shepard's remains out of fear that anti-gay activists would vandalize the site, but due to the support of Budde and Robinson, they felt his remains would be safe at the National Cathedral.

In June 2020, amid the George Floyd protests in Washington, DC, Budde criticized the use of police and the National Guard to forcibly clear protestors from Lafayette Square ahead of President Donald Trump's pose for a photo op in front of St. John's Church, enabling its use "as a backdrop for a message antithetical to the teachings of Jesus". In August, Budde offered the benediction at the closing of the second night of the 2020 Democratic National Convention. In her prayer, Budde asked God for the "grace to do something big for something good" (quoting William Sloane Coffin). When convention organizers suggested she deliver the benediction from in front of St. John's Church, she declined, saying the idea was "wildly inappropriate".

In September 2024, Budde was one of about 200 Christian leaders and scholars to sign an open letter calling for the preservation of pluralist democracy, and opposition to authoritarian rule, citing it as an imperative of the Christian faith. The statement described democracy's balances and constitutional protections as indispensable means to rein in "human tendencies to dominate, demean, and exploit" and thus fulfill Christian principles (such as the call to be peacemakers, the belief that humans are created in God's image, and the injunction to love one's enemy). Budde told Religion News Service that she believed that addressing wealth disparities, preserving religious pluralism, and serving as peacemakers are part of Christian responsibility.

In 2025, Budde delivered a 14-minute Christmas meditation on BBC Radio 4 on Boxing Day.

==== 2025 presidential inauguration service ====
On January 21, 2025, the day after Donald Trump's second inauguration as president, Budde delivered the homily at the interfaith prayer service traditionally held at the Washington National Cathedral after each presidential inauguration. Also in attendance were the new vice president, JD Vance; House speaker Mike Johnson; and Pete Hegseth, Trump's nominee for defense secretary. In the sermon, Budde addressed Trump, who was sitting in the first pew, urging him to show mercy and compassion to vulnerable people, saying, "Millions have put their trust in you. And as you told the nation yesterday, you have felt the providential hand of a loving God. In the name of our God, I ask you to have mercy on the people in our country who are scared now." Budde specifically cited the LGBTQ+ communities, immigrants, and refugees fleeing from war in their countries.

After the service, Trump disparaged Budde as a "so-called Bishop" and "Radical Left hard line Trump hater" on his social media website Truth Social. Trump called the service "very boring" and demanded an apology from Budde and the Episcopal Church. Trump allies also attacked Budde; evangelical pastor Robert Jeffress condemned her for having "insulted rather than encouraged our great president" while Republican congressman Mike Collins said that Budde "should be added to the deportation list". According to Baptist News Global, Megan Basham and other far-right religious figures used the incident to press their views against the ordination of women as pastors. Budde's remarks were welcomed by civil rights advocate Bernice King, Pope Francis's biographer Austen Ivereigh and other public figures, including the Episcopal Church's senior bishop, Sean Rowe, who said that "a plea for mercy, a recognition of the stranger in our midst, is core to the faith ... but it's not bound to political ideology".

When asked by Time's Brian Bennett about Trump's reaction to her message, Budde said, "I don't hate President Trump. I strive not to hate anyone and I dare say that I am not of the 'radical left' either, whatever that means. That is not who I am." When asked if she would heed Trump's demand for an apology, she replied, "I am not going to apologize for asking for mercy for others." Budde described her sermon as fairly mild, with the intended message to the new president that "The country has been entrusted to you. And one of the qualities of a leader is mercy." Budde said that unity requires mercy, humility, and the upholding of human dignity; she warned against America's "culture of contempt" as well as the harms of polarizing narratives.

D.C. Police investigated threatening phone calls made to Budde in the aftermath of the service.

== Recognition and honors ==
Budde was awarded an honorary Doctor of Divinity degree from the Virginia Theological Seminary in 2012.

== Publications ==
- Gathering Up The Fragments: Preaching as Spiritual Practice. Lima, Ohio: CSS Pub. Co., Inc. 2009. ISBN 978-0-7880-2605-8.
- Receiving Jesus: The Way of Love. New York: Church Publishing. 2019. ISBN 978-1-64065-240-8. with a foreword written by Presiding Bishop Michael Curry.
- How We Learn to Be Brave: Decisive Moments in Life and Faith. New York: Penguin. 2023. ISBN 978-0-593-53921-7.

== See also ==
- List of bishops of the Episcopal Church in the United States of America
- List of Episcopal bishops of the United States
- List of female Anglican bishops

Episcopal Church (USA) titles
Preceded by John Bryson Chane	Bishop of Washington; 2011–present	Incumbent
