= Alfred Harding (bishop) =

19th and 20th-century American Episcopal bishop

The Right Reverend Alfred Harding
- Bishop of Washington
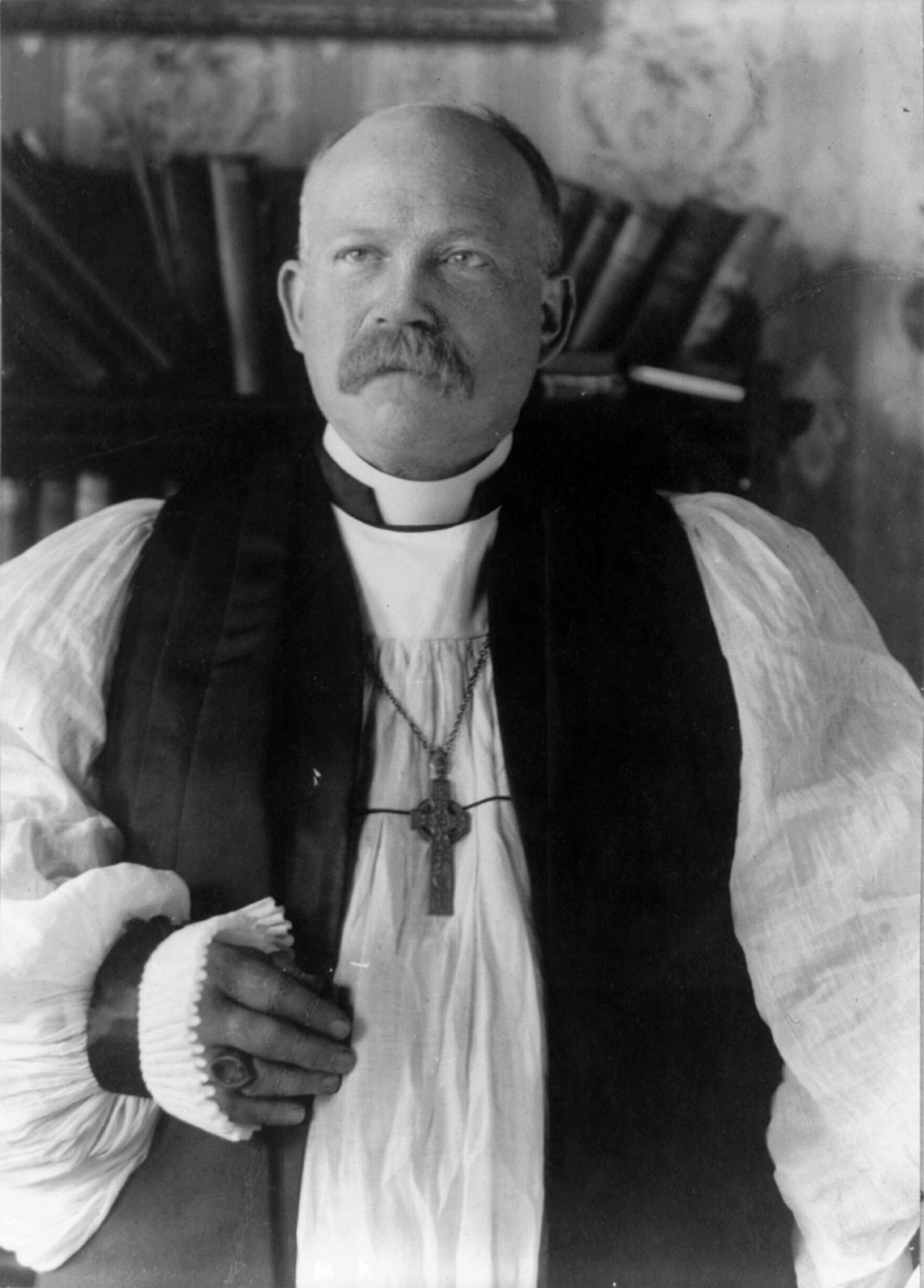
- Bishop Alfred Harding
- Church: Episcopal Church
- Province: Province 3
- Diocese: Washington
- Elected: 1908
- In office: 1909–1923
- Predecessor: Henry Yates Satterlee
- Successor: James E. Freeman
- Other post: Dean of Washington National Cathedral

Orders
- Ordination: May 20, 1883 by Abram Newkirk Littlejohn
- Consecration: January 25, 1909 by Charles E. Woodcock

Personal details
- Born: August 15, 1852 Lisburn, Ireland
- Died: May 2, 1923 (aged 70) Washington, D.C., United States
- Buried: Bethlehem Chapel of Washington National Cathedral
- Denomination: Anglican
- Spouse: Justine Prindle Douglas (m. 1887)
- Children: 3
- Education: Trinity College; Berkeley Divinity School

Alfred Harding (August 15, 1852 – May 2, 1923) was the second Episcopal Bishop of Washington. He was elected in 1909 to succeed Henry Yates Satterlee, the first bishop of the diocese (1896–1908). Harding was de facto dean of Washington National Cathedral from 1909 until 1916.

== Biography ==
Harding was born on August 15, 1852, in Lisburn, Ireland, the son of Richard Harding. He emigrated in 1867 to the United States, settling in Brooklyn, New York. He became a naturalized citizen in 1870 and spent several years as a businessman.

=== Education ===
Harding graduated from Trinity College in Hartford, Connecticut, in 1879. He completed studies at the Berkeley Divinity School, graduating in 1882.

=== Marriage ===
Harding married in 1887 Justine Prindle Douglas, in Washington, D.C. She was the daughter of Dr. John Hancock Douglas, an 1843 graduate of Williams College and an 1847 graduate of the University of Pennsylvania School of Medicine. He was the personal physician for President Ulysses S. Grant, attending him from 22 October 1884, till the death of the latter, 23 July 1885. Alfred and Justine were the parents of four children, three of whom survived to adulthood: Alfred J., Charlotte G., and Paul Curtis. A son, Douglas died in 1891 at the age of 3.

=== Ordination ===
In 1882, Harding was made a deacon by Abram N. Littlejohn, the first Episcopal Bishop of Long Island and in 1883 he was ordained a priest by Littlejohn. The year of his diaconate was spent as an assistant to Henry M. Nelson Jr., rector of Trinity Church, Geneva, New York. From 1883 to 1887, he was the assistant rector of Old St. Paul's Parish in Baltimore, Maryland. He was the third rector of St. Paul's Parish, K Street, in Washington, D.C., serving there from 1887 until 1909, when he became Bishop of Washington. In 1889 he was invited to become dean of Christ Church Cathedral in St. Louis, Missouri, but declined.

=== Consecration ===
On January 25, 1909, Harding was consecrated as the second Episcopal Bishop of Washington at Trinity Episcopal Church in Washington, D.C. The primary consecrator was Charles E. Woodcock, the third Episcopal Bishop of Kentucky. Harding was the 240th bishop consecrated in the Episcopal Church.

When the Harriet Lane Johnston choir school (St. Albans) opened, nine years after the National Cathedral School for Girls, Harding made Edgar Priest supervisor of music at these schools in August 1909. His formal appointment as the Cathedral's first organist and choirmaster came in 1911, in anticipation of the opening of Bethlehem Chapel for services the following May.

=== Death ===
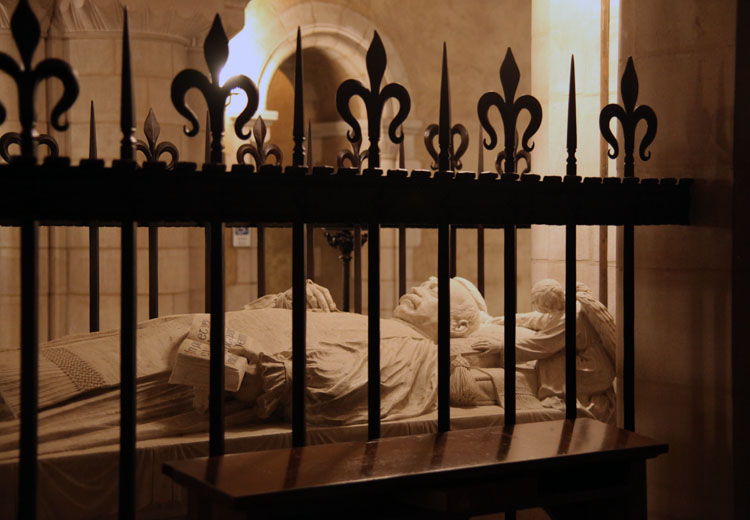
Tomb of Harding in the National Cathedral

Harding died on May 2, 1923, in Washington, D.C. Both he and his wife are buried in the Resurrection Chapel of Washington National Cathedral.

Episcopal Church (USA) titles
Preceded by Henry Yates Satterlee	Bishop of Washington; 1909-1923	Succeeded by James E. Freeman
Preceded by None	Dean of Washington National Cathedral; 1909–1916	Succeeded by George C. F. Bratenahl
