= Joseph Marcus Ritchie =

American organist, choirmaster, and composer (1946–1989)

Joseph Marcus Ritchie (born 1946 in Elizabethton; †21 August 1989 in Washington, D.C.) was an American organist, choirmaster and composer. He often shortened his name to "J. Marcus Ritchie."

== Biography ==
After graduating from Elizabethton High School in 1960, Ritchie studied for two years at Eastern Tennessee State University, then enrolled at Greensboro College's School of Music, where he received his Bachelor of Music degree in 1964, and at Northwestern University, where he received his Master of Music degree in 1965. His principal organ teachers were Ruth Fuque Stout during high school, Harold G. Andrews at Greensboro College and Grigg T. Fountain at Northwestern University. He studied privately with Marie-Claire Alain, Marie-Madeleine Duruflé and Maurice Duruflé. He also underwent a five-week training in Boychoir techniques, repertory and choral conducting with Simon Preston at Christ Church College Oxford in 1972.

He served as organist-choirmaster of Belle Meade United Methodist Church in Nashville, St. Martin's Episcopal Church in Metairie, and Trinity Episcopal Church in New Orleans (1970–1975), where he established a concert series entitled "Abendmusiken." He was dean of the American Guild of Organist' New Orleans Chapter and organized a Duruflé festival in New Orleans. He taught at the Sewanee Music Center and at New Orleans Baptist Theological Seminary.

From 1975 through 1979, he was organist and choirmaster at the Episcopal Cathedral of St. Philip in Atlanta, Georgia. He initiated the Sunday Afternoon Organ Recital Series which preceded Evensong. During his tenure he was teaching both at Emory University (appointed teaching affiliate in 1975) and at Mercer University. In October 1976 he organized a Jehan Alain festival, featuring Marie-Claire Alain and John Obetz, among others.

After leaving the Cathedral in 1979, he became affiliated with East Point Presbyterian Church in Atlanta and founded the Festival Singers of Atlanta, whose first concert was held in Fall 1981. He also managed the concert series for the Roman Catholic Shrine of the Immaculate Conception in Atlanta.

In 1986, he succeeded Paul Callaway as Director of Music at St. Paul's Parish, K Street, in Washington, D.C. His Washington debut as a recitalist had already taken place in March 1979 at National City Christian Church. Joseph Marcus Ritchie died of AIDS. His body was cremated and buried in the columbarium of St. Paul's Parish, K Street. A memorial fund was inaugurated, which enabled the Parish to offer several organ recitals in honor of its late organist, e.g., by John Obetz in 1992. Greensboro College, Ritchie's alma mater, named one of its endowments after him.

Ritchie was also active as a composer. The Hymnal 1982 of the Episcopal Church contains his 1976 setting of the canticle «The Third Song of Isaiah» (no. S-227). The music libraries of the Cathedral of St. Philip and St Paul's Parish, K Street hold scores of a set of Preces and Responses (1982), the anthem Born for this (1982), and the motet Jesu! Rex Admirabilis (1977, rev. 1987). In addition to this, Ritchie composed several Anglican chants, especially one for Psalm 98, which is used in various Episcopal parishes in the Anglo-Catholic tradition.

== Writings ==
- Southern Cathedrals Festival. A Review. In: Music - the Journal of the A.G.O. and the R.C.C.O. 6 (1972), issue 11, p. 37.
- Aldeburgh Festival. A Review. In: Music - the Journal of the A.G.O. and the R.C.C.O. 6 (1972), issue 11, p. 38&56.
