= Lorenzo Sewell =

American Christian pastor (born 1981)

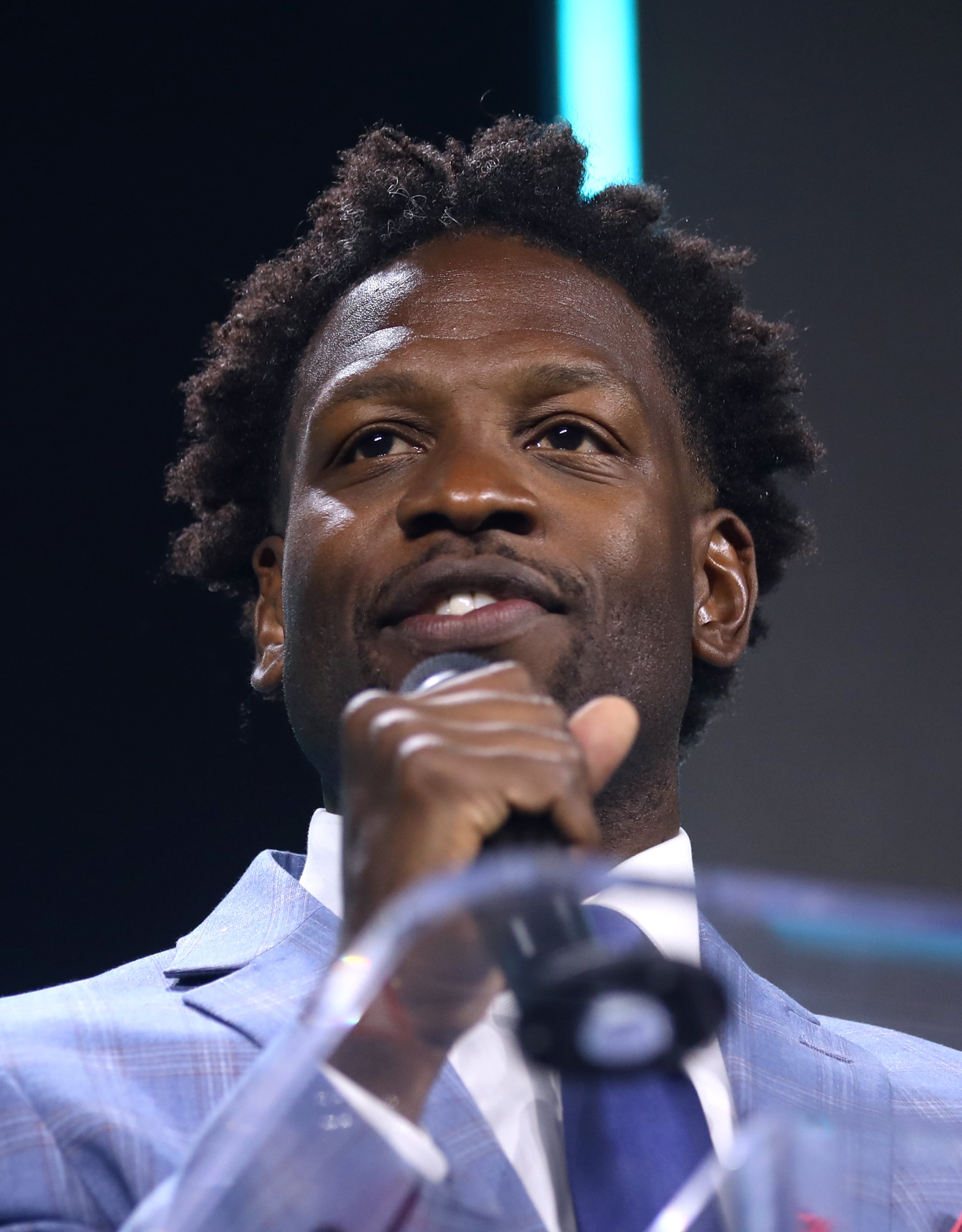
- Sewell speaking at The Believers Summit in 2024
- Born: March 24, 1981 (age 45); Detroit, Michigan, U.S.
- Occupation: Pastor
- Political party: Republican
- Spouse: Molly Sewell (m. 2007)
- Children: 3

Lorenzo Sewell (born March 24, 1981) is an American non-denominational pastor and former gang leader who serves as the senior pastor at the Detroit-based 180 Church. He spoke on day four of the 2024 Republican National Convention, and gave one of the three benedictions at the Second inauguration of Donald Trump before launching his first meme coin $Lorenzo.

The 180 Church is a non-denominational gospel-centered congregation, formerly known as the Evangel Church. It changed its name during the COVID-19 pandemic to symbolize people turning their lives around and to avoid negative connotations of the term Evangelical.

== Early life ==
Sewell was born and raised in Detroit. While he was in Fraser High School, his father went to prison for murder, and his younger brother was hit by a car and killed. Sewell was heavily involved in drugs, drug dealing and gang life, ultimately becoming a gang leader.

During his senior year of high school, while under the influence of drugs and alcohol in Daytona Beach, Sewell was kicked out of a resort. On his way out, the security guard told Sewell that he would pray for him. On April 18, 1999, Sewell attended his grandmother's church, and had a ‘Damascus Road’ experience that turned his life around.

Sewell was the lead pastor of the Woodside Bible Church Pontiac Campus. Sewell also served as the Director of the Dream Center of Pontiac. He became senior pastor at 180 Church on December 31, 2018. In January 2019, Sewell became the Lead Servant of Evangel Ministries in Detroit.

== Stand with Evangel ==
In 2023, an organization called "Stand with Evangel" attempted to have Sewell removed as pastor of the 180 Church. Stand with Evangel had the locks changed on the church in early June 2023. This led to a confrontation in front of the church on June 7 in which Sewell was handcuffed.

As a result, Sewell began holding services in various other locations, including a methadone clinic. On June 29, Wayne Circuit Judge Kathleen McCarthy granted Sewell a temporary restraining order, allowing him to continue holding services at the church.

== Politics ==
Sewell is a pro-Trump political activist who has stated that "it is impossible to be politically neutral," arguing that the Bible is inherently a political book "from Genesis to Revelations."

Sewell has made a number of controversial statements. He has stated that while "not every Democrat is a demon," the Democratic platform is "demonic." He has also expressed opposition to LGBTQ rights and diversity, equity, and inclusion initiatives.

Sewell attributed Trump's cultural awareness and cultural intelligence in his willingness to speak to black communities for why Black voters gravitated toward Trump in the 2024 election. Leading into the election, Sewell hosted "Get out the vote" events, prayed at rallies for Trump and attended numerous campaign roundtables of faith leaders and pro-Trump conservative Christian rallies.

Besides his campaign events with Trump, Sewell was also critical of Trump's opponent, Kamala Harris. When Harris stopped in Michigan for a livestream event hosted by Oprah Winfrey, Sewell criticized the Democratic candidate, and questioned where she had been in supporting Detroit over the past four years (while serving as Vice President). He called her visit 'irrelevant', and a superficial attempt to gain support among black voters rather than addressing the city's long-standing issues, especially in the school system where he said approximately 80% of the students cannot read.

"Detroit was voted the neediest city in America in 2021 in terms of access to health care, home values and crime during her time as vice president."

Sewell was critical of Bishop Mariann Budde's homily at the interfaith prayer service held at the Washington National Cathedral after the presidential inauguration. Budde asked the new President in the name of our God to have mercy on "the people in our country who are scared now," specifically citing the LGBTQ+ communities, immigrants, and refugees fleeing from war in their countries. Sewell called it "theological malpractice on every angle," and stated that "there is nowhere in Scripture that we see that a leader would stand up without God's permission and speak to someone who is in authority."

Sewell credits Ramon Jackson and his book, The Black America Report for shaping his political beliefs. Sewell and Jackson teamed up and testified before the Michigan House Election Integrity Committee on March 25, 2025 about the need to look at Michigan’s election systems, claiming that there were multiple instances in which people reported that absentee ballots were cast in their names without their knowledge or consent. Sewell told lawmakers that the people of Detroit are being misrepresented in elections due to cheating. While Jackson claimed that he had evidence of individuals who did not vote or have since left the city but their vote was counted in Detroit.

Following a series of 2026 anti-Islam protests in Dearborn, Michigan, Sewell attended the August 18 Dearborn town hall, where he accused the town of operating under Sharia law, and asked each of the individual members of the city council to denounce Sharia law. They did not.

America, we have lost this city. This is a city that is no longer up under American laws; we are up under Sharia law. We will not have it anymore!

Outside the town hall, Sewell spoke at a protest organized by far-right activist Jake Lang, who spent four years in prison for attacking a police officer during the January 6 attacks. Nazi sympathizers were present during the protests. After Lang was assaulted by a counterprotester, Sewell accused the Dearborn police of bias, stating "Dearborn police know how to act on American laws when they want to. And they know how to enact Sharia law when they want to."

=== 2024 Republican National Convention ===
Then-former President Donald Trump appeared at the 180 Church in June 2024 for a roundtable while on the campaign trail. At this roundtable, Sewell remarked, "Let us bow our heads, Heavenly Father. We thank you for the 45th president of the United States of America. He was charged with 34 felonies, then he raised $53 million in 24 hours". Following their meeting, Sewell was invited to speak on day four of the 2024 Republican National Convention at Fiserv Forum in Milwaukee, Wisconsin on July 18, 2024. Sewell praised Trump for going into a church in the hood in a Democratic stronghold during his birthday weekend, and spending time with average everyday Americans, and asking for prayer. He then quoted Ephesians 6:11 in speaking on the Attempted assassination of Donald Trump in Pennsylvania on July 13.

=== Second inauguration of President Trump ===
In his sermon, Sewell described Trump's survival of an assassination attempt as "a millimeter miracle". He quoted the Declaration of Independence in saying that "we hold these truths to be self-evident, that all men are created equal," and followed that by quoting Martin Luther King Jr.'s "I Have a Dream" speech with, "We will live in a nation where we will not be judged by the color of our skin, but by the content of our character." (Trump's inauguration was held on Martin Luther King Jr. Day).

=== 2026 midterms ===
Sewell served as an official faith advisor to Mike Rogers, the Republican candidate for U.S. senate in Michigan. Sewell claimed that Abdul El-Sayed's victory in the Michigan Democratic primary was the result of "skulduggery and malfeasance", claiming that black voters would never choose an "Islamic jihadist...Black people don't even like Arabs in our community." Sewell spoke at the 2026 Republican National Convention, saying the election was about spiritual warfare. “How many know that we are saying today, not today, Satan? You will not steal our country. You will not have our children. You will not have our families; enough is enough!" Sewell said. In September 2026, Sewell said that people should not cast absentee ballots because of "cheating" and called for President Trump to declare a national emergency to allow only a single day of voting. Following Democratic victories in the 2026 United States midterm elections, Lang said he had a "Holy Ghost hunch" the elections were stolen and called for "another January 6th."

Sewell spoke at a faith rally that was part of the United States Semiquincentennial alongside Pete Hegseth, Marco Rubio, and Mike Johnson.

== Personal life ==
Sewell met his wife, Molly, in June 2005. They married two years later, and have three children: Isabella, Elijah, and Naomi.

Following his benediction at the Trump inauguration, he announced on social media that he was endorsing a new cryptocurrency that was created in his likeness, which he encouraged his followers to buy. The cryptocurrency has been described as a meme coin.
