= James E. Freeman (bishop) =

American clergyman

The Right Reverend James Edward Freeman
- Bishop of Washington
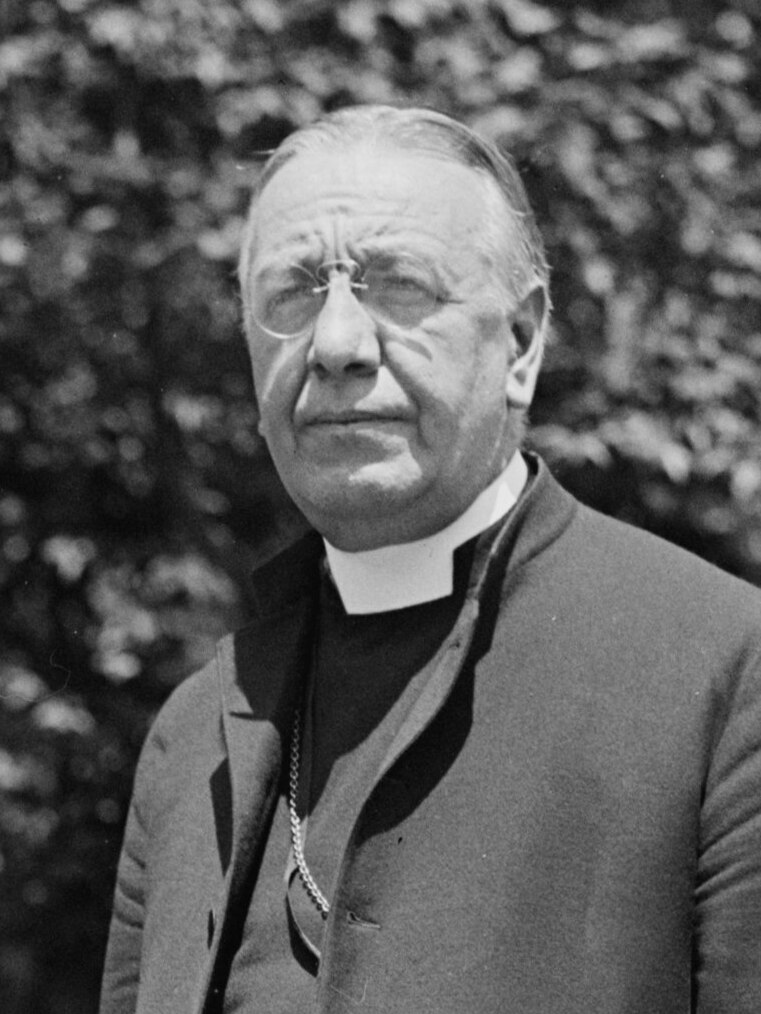
- Bishop Freeman in 1924
- Church: Episcopal Church
- Diocese: Washington
- Elected: June 1923
- In office: 1923–1943
- Predecessor: Alfred Harding
- Successor: Angus Dun

Orders
- Ordination: April 28, 1895 by Henry C. Potter
- Consecration: September 29, 1923 by Thomas F. Gailor

Personal details
- Born: July 24, 1866 New York City, New York, United States
- Died: June 6, 1943 (aged 76) Washington, D.C., United States
- Buried: St Joseph's Chapel, Washington National Cathedral
- Denomination: Anglican
- Parents: Henry Freeman & Mary Morgan
- Spouse: Ella Vigelius (m. April 16, 1890)
- Children: 3

James Edward Freeman (July 24, 1866 – June 6, 1943) was the third bishop of the Episcopal Diocese of Washington, serving from 1923 to 1943.

== Biography ==
Freeman was born on July 24, 1866, in New York City. He was educated in public school in New York after which he commenced employment in the accounting department of the Long Island Railroad. He also worked with the Hudson River and New York Central Railroad. After fifteen years he started to train for the priesthood after he was encouraged by the Bishop of New York Horatio Potter.

He was ordained deacon on May 20, 1894, and priest a year later. After ordination he served in St John's Church and of St Andrew's Chapel, both in Yonkers, New York. In 1909 he became rector of St Mark's Church in Minneapolis, Minnesota, the present day cathedral. In 1921 he moved to Washington, D.C., to become rector of the Church of the Epiphany.

He was elected Coadjutor Bishop of West Texas in 1911 however he declined the offer. He also lost the election for the Bishop of Colorado by one vote and refused the position of Dean of New York's Cathedral of St. John the Divine. Freeman was also elected as Bishop of Washington in 1923, a position which he accepted. He was consecrated on September 29, 1923, by Thomas F. Gailor, Bishop of Tennessee. During his episcopacy, he led a national campaign to raise funds for the construction of the Washington National Cathedral. In 1934, his pastoral letter from the 51st General Convention warned against the destructive effects of divorce. He died in 1943 in Washington DC . He also officiated at memorial services for Warren G. Harding, Woodrow Wilson, and William Howard Taft.

Episcopal Church (USA) titles
Preceded by Alfred Harding	Bishop of Washington; 1923–1943	Succeeded by Angus Dun
