= Episcopal Diocese of Washington =

Episcopal Church diocese in the US

Coordinates: 38°55′50″N 77°4′15″W

Diocese of Washington

Location
- Country: United States
- Territory: District of Columbia, Prince George County, Montgomery County, Charles County, St. Mary's County
- Ecclesiastical province: Province III

Statistics
- Congregations: 85 (2024)
- Members: 30,741 (2023)

Information
- Denomination: Episcopal Church
- Established: December 4, 1895
- Cathedral: Cathedral Church of Saint Peter and Saint Paul

Current leadership
- Bishop: Mariann Budde

Map
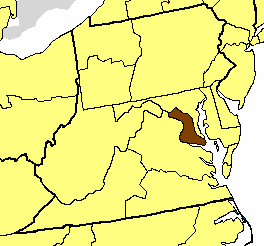
- Location of the Diocese of Washington

Website
- www.edow.org

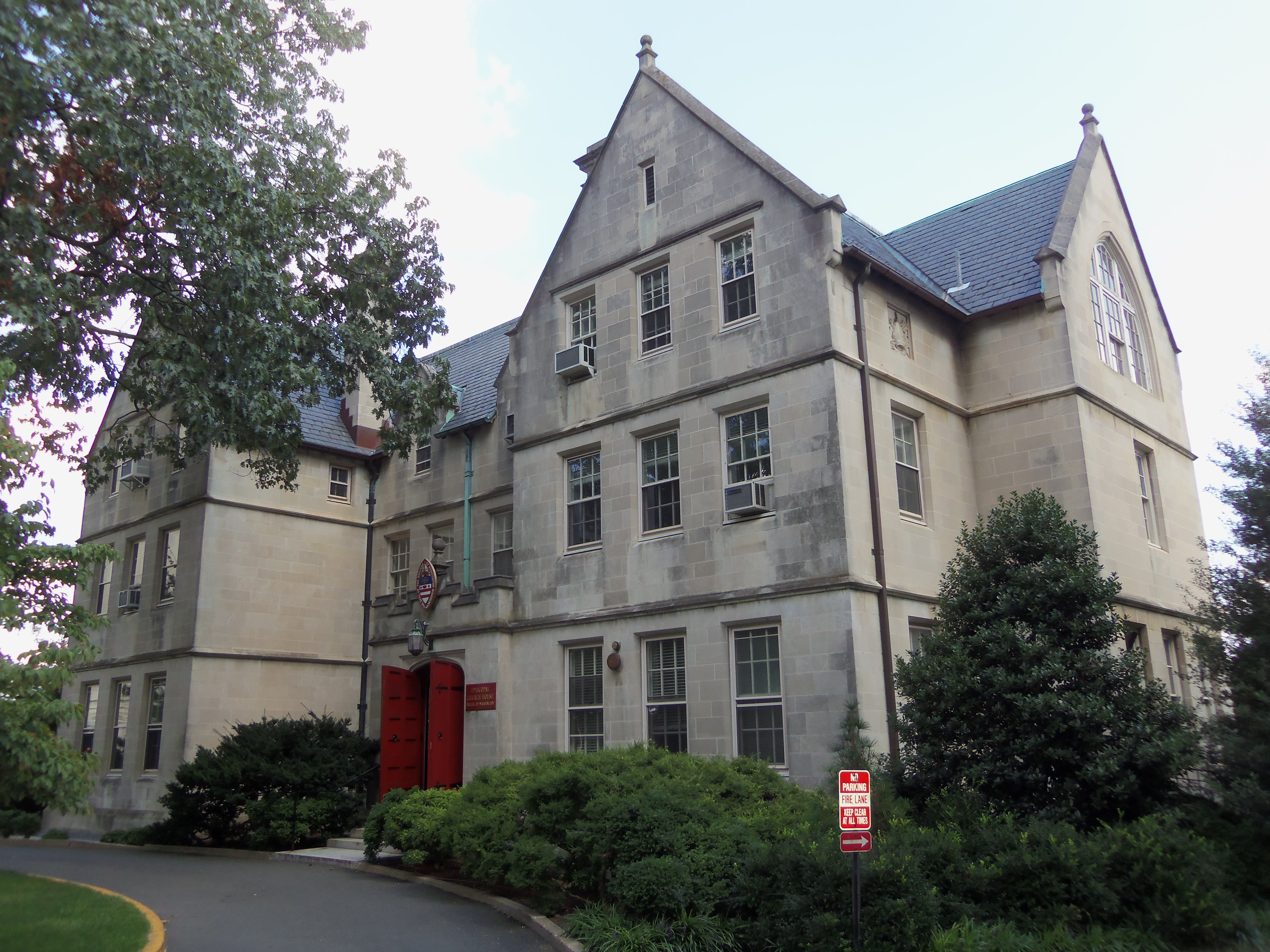
Episcopal Church House on Mount St. Alban, near the Washington National Cathedral in Washington, D.C.

The Episcopal Diocese of Washington is a diocese of the Episcopal Church covering Washington, D.C., and nearby counties of Maryland in the United States. With a membership of over 30,000, the diocese is led by the bishop of Washington, Mariann Budde. It is home to Washington National Cathedral, which is the seat of both the diocesan bishop and the presiding bishop of the Episcopal Church.

In 2024, the diocese reported average Sunday attendance (ASA) of 8,738 persons; this was a relative decrease from 13,135 reported in 2016. The most recent membership statistics (2023) showed 30,741 members, down from 40,352 in 2015. No membership statistics were reported in 2024 national parochial reports.

== History ==
Since its creation in 1895 from the Episcopal Diocese of Maryland, the territory has included the District of Columbia, adjacent suburban Maryland counties of Prince George's and Montgomery, and the southern Maryland counties of Charles County and St. Mary's County.

The land now known as the District of Columbia once comprised parts of Montgomery County and Prince George's County in Maryland. A congregation which later became known as Rock Creek parish was founded in 1712, and by seven years later had built a chapel of ease for (Broad Creek Parish), which was the spiritual counterpart to secular government in Prince George's County. The congregation built a larger, Georgian style building in 1775, which is now known as St. Paul's Episcopal Church, Rock Creek Parish. It is the oldest religious institution within the District of Columbia. The former glebe (farm to support the parish priest) became the non-denominational Rock Creek Cemetery, now also home to the InterFaith Conference of Metropolitan Washington.

As European settlement moved westward and the area's population increased, additional congregations began and built chapels within what Maryland's General Assembly in 1776 designated Montgomery County. These congregations had split off from Broad or Rock Creek parish and became Prince George's Parish in 1726 (later Christ Episcopal Church (Rockville, Maryland)) and Eden or Sugarland Parish in 1737 (which later became St. Peter's Church (Poolesville, Maryland)), only to be reassigned to the newly formed diocese of Washington over a century later.

After the American Revolutionary War, both Maryland and Virginia donated land to form the new federal District of Columbia. Additional congregations which ultimately became parishes formed much nearer the Potomac River at this time, including Christ Church, Washington Parish (a/k/a Navy Yard; 1794), Christ Church (Georgetown, Washington, D.C.), and St. John's Episcopal Church, Georgetown (1796). After the destruction of the War of 1812, with the Burning of Washington in August 1814, St. John's Episcopal Church, Lafayette Square (1815) was built facing historic Lafayette Square across from the rebuilt "President's House", at 1600 Pennsylvania Avenue, N.W., (in the historic Lafayette Square Historic District) which later became known as the "Executive Mansion" and later the White House. St. John's has been long known as the "Church of the Presidents", visited frequently by neighboring chief executives and is the traditional site for an early morning prayer service and mass during inauguration days on March 4 and later January 20. Another historic Episcopal church formed in the capital city, and which hosted nearby Maryland diocesan conventions, is the Church of the Epiphany (Washington, D.C.). Parishes formed during the 19th Century's "Oxford Movement" included St. Paul's Church on K Street, and St. James' Church on Capitol Hill. At least six historic African-American parishes formed in the capital city during the late 19th and early 20th Centuries.

Construction of the Gothic Revival "Cathedral Church of Saint Peter and Saint Paul in the City and the Diocese of Washington" (usually known as the Washington National Cathedral) on Mount Saint Albans at the intersection of Massachusetts and Wisconsin Avenues in northwest Washington began with a charter issued by the United States Congress in 1893 and on September 29, 1907, the cornerstone was laid in the presence of 26th President Theodore Roosevelt and a crowd of 20,000 and continued with fits and starts until its general completion in the early 1990s, with a ceremony attended by 41st President, George H. W. Bush, serving as a "national house of prayer for all people" and becoming a national landmark for the Protestant Episcopal Church in the U.S.A. and icon for the Anglican Communion in the world.

== Bishops ==
The first African-American bishop for the Diocese was elected and ordained with John Thomas Walker as the sixth prelate in 1977 who served until his death 12 years later. After the eighth bishop of Washington, John Bryson Chane, announced his intention to retire in the fall of 2011, a diocesan convention on June 18, 2011, elected Mariann Edgar Budde as its first female diocesan bishop. She was ordained and consecrated on November 12, 2011.

== List of Bishops of Washington ==
Bishop of Washington	Name	Dates
1st	Henry Yates Satterlee (1843–1908)	1896–1908 (died in office February 22, 1908)
2nd	Alfred Harding (1852–1923)	1909–1923 (died in office May 2, 1923)
3rd	James Edward Freeman (1866–1943)	1923–1943 (died in office June 6, 1943)
4th	Angus Dun (1892–1971)	1944–1962
5th	William Forman Creighton (1909–1987)	1962–1977
6th	John Thomas Walker (1925–1989)	1977–1989 (Suffragan 1971–1976, Coadjutor, 1976–1977; died in office September 30, 1989)
7th	Ronald Hayward Haines (1934–2008)	1990–2000 (Suffragan 1986–1989; Diocesan pro tempore 1989–1990)
8th	John Bryson Chane (1944–)	2002–2011
9th	Mariann Edgar Budde (1959–)	2011–

== Assistant, Suffragan and Coadjutor bishops ==
- Paul Moore, Jr. (1919–2003), Bishop Suffragan, 1964–1970 (subsequently Coadjutor Bishop of New York 1970–1971 and 13th Bishop of New York 1972–1989)
- John Thomas Walker (1925–1989), Bishop Suffragan, 1971–1976 and Bishop Coadjutor, 1976 to 1977 (subsequently Bishop of Washington pro tempore and 6th Bishop of Washington)
- William Benjamin Spofford Jr. (1921–2013), Assistant Bishop, 1979–1984, 1990 (previously Bishop of Eastern Oregon, 1969–1979)
- George Theodore Masuda (1913–1995), Assisting Bishop, 1985–1986 (previously Bishop of North Dakota 1965–1979)
- Ronald Hayward Haines (1934–2008), Bishop Suffragan 1986–1989 (subsequently Bishop of Washington pro tempore and 7th Bishop of Washington)
- William Benjamin Spofford Jr. (1921–2013), Assistant Bishop, 1979–1984, 1990 (previously Bishop of Eastern Oregon, 1969–1979)
- Jane Hart Holmes Dixon (1937–2012), Bishop Suffragan 1992–2000, Bishop of Washington 'pro tempore' 2001–2002
- Allen Lyman Bartlett Jr. (1929–), Assisting Bishop 2001–2004 (previously Coadjutor Bishop of Philadelphia 1986–1987 and Bishop of Pennsylvania 1987–1998)
- Barbara Clementine Harris (1930–2020), Assisting Bishop 2003–2007 (previously Bishop Suffragan of the Diocese of Massachusetts 1989–2003)
- Chilton Abbie Richardson Knudsen (1946–), Assisting Bishop 2019–present (previously Bishop of Maine 1997–2008; Interim Bishop, Diocese of Kentucky 2011- 2012; Assistant Bishop, Diocese of New York 2013–2014; Assistant Bishop, Diocese of Long Island 2014–2015; Assistant Bishop, Diocese of Maryland 2015–2018.)
