= Bishop John T. Walker Distinguished Humanitarian Service Award =

The Bishop John T. Walker Distinguished Humanitarian Service Award (BWD or Bishop Walker Dinner) is an award presented annually by Africare to recognize those whose work has made a significant impact on raising the standard of living in Africa. The award is named after John T. Walker, former Episcopal Bishop of Washington, D.C., and Africare board member. Each year, the Africare Bishop John T. Walker Memorial Dinner brings together more than 2,000 people — African heads of state, ministers of commerce and foreign affairs, leaders from the African Union and the United Nations, U.S. government leaders, diplomats, corporate executives, leaders of national organizations and private individuals — who share one focus: They care about Africa.

This is the largest annual event for Africa in the United States, with proceeds supporting the work of Africare. The Dinner is a top multicultural affair as well, embracing all races and a wide array of cultures and nationalities from around the world. The Dinner also honors outstanding humanitarians through the presentation of Africare's Bishop John T. Walker Distinguished Humanitarian Service Award.

== Bishop John T. Walker Background ==
Bishop Walker came to Washington in 1966 as Canon of the Washington Cathedral, with special responsibility for its ministry to the community. He was elected Suffragan Bishop of Washington on May 1, 1971, and became the sixth Bishop of the Episcopal Diocese of Washington on July 3, 1977.

"I know some people get disheartened, and I know some people want to throw in the sponge and give up, but I can't do that. My feeling is too strong that it's God's will that we live together in harmony and peace. It's God's will that we grow beyond our racial animosties and that we must commit ourselves to continue that work. That's why I am here. I am not here for any other reason."

== Past honorees ==
1992	Desmond Tutu
1993	Sargent Shriver
1994	Nelson Mandela
1995	Leon Sullivan
1996	Jimmy Carter
1997	Dorothy I. Height
1998	Andrew Young
1999	Graça Machel
2000	James Wolfensohn
2001	Louis W. Sullivan
2002	Harry Belafonte
2003	Bill Gates and Melinda Gates
2004	Richard G. Lugar and Donald M. Payne
2005	Colin L. Powell
2006	Bill Clinton
2007	Ellen Johnson Sirleaf
2008	George W. Bush
2009	John Legend
2010	Ngozi Okonjo-Iweala
2011	Donald McHenry
2013	Barack Obama
2014	C. Payne Lucas and Joseph C. Kennedy

== BWD history ==
=== BWD 2006 ===
- The Honoree: Bill Clinton
- Main Theme: Orphans and Vulnerable Children "OVC"
- Corporate Sponsor: United Parcel Service, Inc. (UPS)
- Date of Event: Oct 18, 2006

At BWD 2006, held on October 18, Africare presented the Bishop John T. Walker Distinguished Humanitarian Service Award to former President Clinton for his outstanding contributions to peace, justice, and economic opportunity worldwide. The event also highlighted Africare's leading work meeting the needs of children in Africa who have lost one parent or both parents due to HIV/AIDS or through other tragic circumstances.

=== BWD 2005 ===
- The Honoree: Colin L. Powell
- Main Theme: Africare 35th Anniversary
- Corporate Sponsor: Shell Oil Company
- Date of Event: Oct 13, 2005

=== BWD 2004 ===
- The Honoree: Senator 'Richard G. Lugar and Congressman 'Donald M. Payne
- Main Theme: "Through the Eyes of a Child"
- Corporate Sponsor: ChevronTexaco Corporation
- Date of Event: Nov 5, 2004

=== BWD 2003 ===
- The Honoree: Bill Gates and Melinda Gates
- Main Theme: Fighting HIV/AIDS
- Corporate Sponsor: Louis W. Sullivan, M.D.
- Date of Event: Oct 9, 2003

=== BWD 2002 ===
- The Honoree: Harry Belafonte
- Main Theme: Combating HIV/AIDS and poverty
- Corporate Sponsor: Archer Daniels Midland Company
- Date of Event: Oct 24, 2002

=== BWD 2001 ===
- The Honoree: Louis W. Sullivan, M.D.
- Main Theme: Victims of HIV/AIDS in Africa
- Corporate Sponsor: James A. Harmon
- Date of Event: Nov 6, 2001

=== BWD 2000 ===
- The Honoree: James David Wolfensohn
- Main Theme: Combating AIDS in Africa
- Corporate Sponsor: Eastman Kodak Company
- Date of Event: Oct 19, 2000

=== BWD 1999 ===
- The Honoree: Graca Simbine Machel
- Main Theme: The 10th Anniversary Bishop Walker Dinner
- Corporate Sponsor: SBC Communications Inc.
- Date of Event: Sep 27, 1999

=== BWD 1998 ===
- The Honoree: Andrew Young
- Main Theme: Hunger and Poverty
- Corporate Sponsor: Chevron Corporation
- Date of Event: Oct 29, 1998

=== BWD 1997 ===
- The Honoree: Dorothy Irene Height
- Main Theme: Women of Africa & Building a future
- Corporate Sponsor: Discovery Communications, Inc.
- Date of Event: Oct 23, 1997

=== BWD 1996 ===
- The Honoree: Jimmy Carter
- Main Theme: Africare's 25th Anniversary and A tribute to Jimmy Carter
- Corporate Sponsor: SmithKline Beecham
- Date of Event: Oct 17, 1996

=== BWD 1995 ===
- The Honoree: The Reverend Leon Howard Sullivan
- Main Theme: "A Celebration of Democracy in Africa"
- Corporate Sponsor: Cookson Group, plc
- Date of Event: Oct 19, 1995

=== BWD 1994 ===
- The Honoree: Nelson Mandela
- Main Theme:
- Corporate Sponsor: AT&T
- Date of Event:

=== BWD 1993 ===
- The Honoree: Sargent Shriver
- Main Theme:
- Corporate Sponsor: Cookson Group, plc
- Date of Event:

=== BWD 1992 ===
- The Honoree: Archbishop Desmond Tutu
- Main Theme: "Celebrating the commitment to African development and cultural diversity"
- Corporate Sponsor: Pharmaceutical Research and Manufacturers of America (PhrMA)
- Date of Event: Oct 15, 1992

=== BWD 1991 ===
- No Honoree
- Main Theme: "Celebrating the commitment to African development and cultural diversity"
- Corporate Sponsor: IBM Corporation
- Date of Event: Oct 17, 1991

=== BWD 1990 ===
- No Honoree
- Main Theme: Honoring Bishop John T. Walker
- Corporate Sponsor: The Coca-Cola Company
- Date of Event: Oct 18, 2006
