= Jane Dixon =

Bishop in the Episcopal Diocese of Washington

The Right Reverend Jane Holmes Dixon
- Suffragan Bishop of Washington
- Church: Episcopal Church
- Diocese: Washington
- In office: 1992–2002
- Predecessor: Ronald H. Haines
- Successor: John Bryson Chane

Orders
- Ordination: 1982 by John T. Walker
- Consecration: November 19, 1992 by Edmond L. Browning

Personal details
- Born: Jane Hart Holmes; July 24, 1937 Winona, Mississippi, United States
- Died: December 25, 2012 (aged 75) Washington, DC, United States
- Denomination: Anglican
- Spouse: David "Dixie" Dixon, Sr.
- Children: David Dixon, Jr., Edward Dixon, and Mary Dixon Raibman
- Education: Vanderbilt University; Virginia Theological Seminary

Jane Holmes Dixon (born Jane Hart Holmes; July 24, 1937 – December 25, 2012) was an American bishop of the Episcopal Church. She was a suffragan bishop in the Episcopal Diocese of Washington and served as Bishop of Washington pro tempore from 2001 to June 2002. She was the second woman consecrated as a bishop in the Episcopal Church. She died unexpectedly in her sleep in her home in the Cathedral Heights section of Washington, DC on Christmas Day morning in 2012.

== Personal life ==
Dixon was born in Winona, Mississippi in 1937 and was educated locally. After graduating from Vanderbilt University, she married and had three children. She also worked as a teacher.

== Theological education ==
Dixon enrolled at Virginia Theological Seminary at the age of 40, receiving her Master of Divinity degree in 1982. She was ordained that year. She later received the degree of Doctor of Divinity in 1993.

== As Suffragan Bishop of Washington ==
During her tenure as the assisting or suffragan bishop of the Episcopal Diocese of Washington, Dixon insisted on making official visits to all parishes in the diocese. It had previously been understood that she would not visit those that objected to the ordination of women as priests. (The Episcopal Convention of the United States approved the ordination of women as priests in 1976.)

The rector of one such parish, Arthur E Woolley, wrote to her: "As long as I am rector of St. Luke's, Bladensburg, no woman bishop or priest will be permitted to minister in this cure." He described his congregation as "very diverse, drawing members from the Caribbean, India and Africa, where they worshiped in the conservative Anglican tradition." The senior warden of the parish said in an interview, "They're certainly not going to change our view, and we're not going to change theirs, so why not leave us alone and let us worship in peace? Don't be arrogant or mean-spirited..."

When Bishop Dixon made her official visit, she brought 45 supporters with her, joined by nine of St. Luke's parishioners, while the rector absented himself. In 2011, St. Luke's parish left the Episcopal Church for the Roman Catholic church, which does not ordain women as priests.

== As Bishop of Washington pro tempore ==
During her tenure as bishop pro tempore, Dixon sued in federal court to remove a priest, Samuel Edwards, from his position as a parish rector of Christ Church in Accokeek, Maryland. She had refused to approve Edwards's appointment early in 2001, since Edwards opposed the Episcopal Church's beliefs about female and homosexual clergy. Following several months of acrimony, Dixon filed suit to have Edwards removed. The court ruled in her favor in October 2001. After several appeals, the initial decision stood. She retired following the election of the Right Rev. John B. Chane.

== Bibliography ==
- Broadway, Bill (2002). "Ancient Rite Consecrates New Bishop". Washington Post. June 2.
- Caldwell, Deborah (2003). "Family Feud; For Episcopalians, the Price of Divorce May Be Too High". The New York Times. August 10.
- Fahrenthold, David (2001). "Ousted Md. Priest Faces Charge in His Church". Washington Post. December 19.
- Hein, David, and Shattuck, Gardiner H. (2004). The Episcopalians. Westport: Praeger.
- Maraniss, David and Ellen Nakashima (2000). The Prince of Tennessee: The Rise of Al Gore. New York: Simon and Schuster.
