= Barbara Satin =

American transgender activist

- Born: 1934 (age 91–92); St. Paul, Minnesota, U.S.
- Education: College of St. Thomas

Barbara Satin (born 1934) is an American transgender activist. She has advocated for the needs of LGBT seniors, and for the inclusion of transgender people in communities of faith. Satin serves as a consultant for the National LGBTQ Task Force.

== Early life and education ==
Satin was born in 1934 in St. Paul, Minnesota. She felt feminine from an early age, but kept it to herself as she didn't have the vocabulary to express these feelings. Satin was raised in a devout Catholic family, and attended seminary for two years as a teenager, but dropped out due to her feelings about her gender.

Satin finished her secondary education at a Catholic high school, then enrolled at the College of St. Thomas, graduating with a B.A. in sociology. While in college, she learned about Christine Jorgensen, a trans woman widely known for having gender-affirming surgery, and realized that there were other people like herself.

After college, Satin trained as a fighter pilot in the U.S. Air Force. She was medically discharged due to a kidney infection.

== Career and activism ==
After leaving the Air Force, Satin worked in public relations for an insurance company for 30 years. She took early retirement at age 54.

At the age of 60, Satin came out as transgender. She found an LGBT-affirming church in Minneapolis: Spirit of the Lakes, part of the United Church of Christ. Satin became active in the congregation, and was the first openly trans member to serve on the denomination's Executive Council.

In 2014, Satin created the Trans Seminarian Leadership Cohort. With the Spirit of the Lakes church, she helped develop an affordable housing facility for LGBT seniors, one of the first of its kind in the U.S.

In 2015, Satin was invited to the White House to discuss the housing concerns of LGBT seniors. She was also invited to participate in the 2015 White House Conference on Aging.

In 2016, Satin was appointed to the advisory council of the White House Office of Faith-Based and Neighborhood Partnerships by President Barack Obama.

In 2021, Satin participated in the inauguration prayer service for President Joe Biden.

In 2023, Satin received the Carmen Vázquez SAGE Award for Excellence in Leadership on Aging.

Satin serves as a consultant for the National LGBTQ Task Force. She previously worked as their faith director for 15 years, retiring in 2022.

== Personal life ==
Satin got married in 1958. She and her wife have three adult children.

Satin chose the first name Barbara after "the first young woman that I fell in love with", and the last name Satin because "it's something that always attracted me and always a part of my wardrobe".
