= John T. Walker (bishop) =

Episcopal bishop of Washington (1925-1989)

The Right Reverend John Thomas Walker
- Bishop of Washington
- Church: Episcopal Church
- Diocese: Washington
- In office: 1977–1989
- Predecessor: William Creighton
- Successor: Ronald H. Haines
- Other post: Dean of Washington National Cathedral (1978-1989)
- Previous posts: Suffragan Bishop of Washington (1971-1976); Coadjutor Bishop of Washington (1976-1977)

Orders
- Ordination: February 19, 1955 by Richard S. M. Emrich
- Consecration: June 29, 1971 by John E. Hines

Personal details
- Born: July 27, 1925 Barnesville, Georgia, United States
- Died: September 30, 1989 (aged 64) Washington, D.C., United States
- Buried: Washington National Cathedral
- Denomination: Anglican
- Spouse: Rosa Maria Flores
- Children: 3

John Thomas Walker (July 27, 1925 – September 30, 1989) served as Bishop of Washington from 1977 to 1989 in the Episcopal Church. Concurrently, he held the position of Dean of Washington National Cathedral from 1978 to 1989. Prior to his tenure as Bishop, he served as Bishop Coadjutor from 1976 to 1977 and Bishop Suffragan from 1971 to 1976. Notably, he was the first African-American to hold the position of Bishop of Washington.

== Biography ==
Walker was born in Barnesville, Georgia, and raised in Detroit, where he studied at Wayne State University. He started attending the Cathedral Church of St. Paul, Detroit while at WSU, and was supported by the cathedral parish in his ordination to the priesthood. In 1951, he became the first African American student admitted to the Virginia Theological Seminary. Walker first arrived in Washington D.C. as the Canon of Washington National Cathedral. He was the first Black Episcopal Bishop of the Diocese of Washington, a man from humble beginnings who became a powerbroker in the nation's capital.

He gained international recognition for his commitment to social activism and was a close friend of Archbishop Desmond Tutu. Walker was once arrested during a protest against apartheid at the South African Embassy. From 1975 until his passing in 1989, Bishop Walker served as President of the Board of Directors of Africare. In his honor, the organization presents the Bishop John T. Walker Distinguished Humanitarian Service Award annually.

In tribute to the first African-American Bishop of the Episcopal Diocese of Washington his numerous contributions, The Bishop John T. Walker School was established in September 2008. This tuition-free school, catering to boys from kindergarten through sixth grade school is located in Southeast, Washington, D.C. Founded by the Episcopal Diocese of Washington, the school aims to address the significant educational challenges faced by African-American boys in the low-income communities east of the Anacostia River.

Also named after Walker is the Bishop John T. Walker Learning Center in Washington, D.C., whose mission is "to support, encourage, and facilitate life-long learning to all peoples through instruction, dialogue, exploration, human interactions, and exchanges."

In 1989, he received an honorary Doctorate of Divinity from Princeton University.

The Cathedral Church of St. Paul, Detroit honors his memory with a bas-relief made in Pewabic Tile.

Walker died suddenly on September 30, 1989, at the age of 64, of heart failure following triple bypass surgery. He is buried in Washington National Cathedral.

Episcopal Church (USA) titles
Preceded by William F. Creighton	Bishop of the Episcopal Diocese of Washington; 1977–1989	Succeeded by Ronald H. Haines
Preceded by Francis B. Sayre, Jr.	Dean of Washington National Cathedral; 1978–1989	Succeeded by Nathan D. Baxter
