= John Bryson Chane =

American Episcopal bishop (born 1944)

The Right Reverend John Bryson Chane
- Bishop of Washington
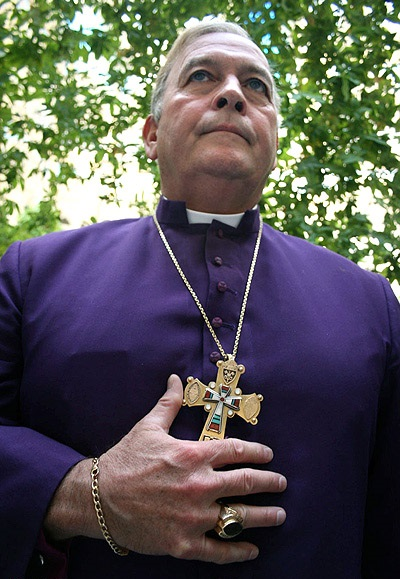
- Chane in the Iranian city of Qom during his meeting with Naser Makarem Shirazi, 10 October 2007
- Church: Episcopal Church
- Diocese: Washington
- Elected: January 26, 2002
- In office: 2002–2011
- Predecessor: Ronald H. Haines
- Successor: Mariann Edgar Budde

Orders
- Ordination: June 24, 1972 (deacon); January 6, 1973 (priest)
- Consecration: June 1, 2002 by Frank Griswold

Personal details
- Born: May 13, 1944 (age 82) Boston, Massachusetts, United States
- Denomination: Anglican
- Spouse: Karen Chane

John Bryson Chane (born May 13, 1944) is a retired bishop of the Episcopal Church. The eighth diocesan bishop of Washington, he was consecrated at Washington National Cathedral on June 1, 2002, leading the Episcopal Diocese of Washington until he retired in November 2011. During this time, he also served between June 2003 and April 2005 as interim dean of Washington National Cathedral. In his role as Bishop of Washington, Chane served as president and CEO of the Protestant Episcopal Cathedral Foundation, which oversees the operations of Washington National Cathedral and the three cathedral schools: St. Alban's School for Boys, the National Cathedral School for Girls, and Beauvoir, the National Cathedral Elementary School.

Washingtonian Magazine named him as one of the 150 most influential leaders in the District of Columbia. The Sunday Telegraph in London called him one of the most prominent leaders in the Anglican Communion.

A leader in global interfaith dialogue and study, Chane traveled to Iran on numerous occasions as the invited guest of former Iranian President Mohammad Khatami. In late 2011, he was part of a four-person delegation that traveled to Tehran, and was instrumental in freeing the American hikers held in Evin Prison. He is one of the few from the West who ever met with Ayatollah Ali Khamenei, the Supreme Leader of the Islamic Republic of Iran.

Chane has participated as a presenter at conferences in Oslo and Tehran sponsored by the Oslo Center for Peace and Human Rights, the Club de Madrid, and Le Dialogue des Civilizations, focusing on religion, politics and terrorism, religion and politics and gender equality. He continues to work with the Brookings Institution in Washington, D.C., as a planner and presenter at the annual U.S. Islamic World Forum, held in Doha, Qatar.

He has spoken on numerous occasions at the Industrial College of The Armed Forces in Washington D.C., the U.S. Secretary of State's Open Forum and as the Anglican principal at the semi-annual Christian-Muslim Summit sponsored by Washington National Cathedral. A respected speaker and charismatic preacher, he has been invited on several occasions by the Chautauqua Institution of New York to serve as Preacher in Residence.

Chane has been the recipient of various awards, including D.C.'s Interfaith Bridge Builders Award, the George Washington University President's Medal, the Berea College Founder's Medal, Search for Common Ground's Award for Global Peace and Reconciliation, the Rumi Forum's Global Peace Award and the Yale Divinity School's Lux et Veritas Award. He was a contributing author to Iraq Uncensored, an initiative of the bipartisan American Security Project,

On January 30, 2010, Chane announced his intention to retire as Episcopal Bishop of Washington, stepping down from that role in 2011. The ninth bishop, Mariann Edgar Budde, was consecrated and installed at Washington National Cathedral on November 12, 2011.

== Life and career ==
A Boston native, Chane served as dean of St. Paul's Cathedral in San Diego and also served congregations in Southborough, Massachusetts, Erie, Pennsylvania and Montvale, New Jersey. He holds a bachelor's degree from Boston University and a Master of Divinity degree from Yale Divinity School. He has received honorary doctorates from Virginia Theological Seminary, Episcopal Divinity School and Berkeley Divinity School at Yale University.

Chane and his wife, Karen, have two sons, Chris and Ian, and three grandchildren, Madeline, Althea and Ashton. He served as team chaplain for Team USA Hockey during the 1980 Olympics. He plays the drums in a band called The Chane Gang.

== Position on issues of human sexuality ==
In August 2003, Chane was among those who voted to confirm the election of Gene Robinson, the first openly gay priest in a partnered relationship to serve as a bishop of the Episcopal Church. Robinson was consecrated as Episcopal Bishop of New Hampshire in November of that year, and served in that position until 2013. In the Anglican realignment, Chane strongly criticized the bishops who diverged from the wider Anglican Communion on sexuality issues.

In February 2006, Chane criticized Archbishop Peter Akinola, at that time the Anglican primate of Nigeria, for issuing a statement on behalf of the Anglican Church of Nigeria supporting Nigerian legislation to criminalize same-sex marriage, media depictions of "same-sex amorous relationships," and the registration of "gay clubs, societies and organizations."

Chane, writing in the Washington Post, criticized Akinola, writing that "The archbishop's support for this law violates numerous Anglican Communion documents that call for a "listening process" involving gay Christians and their leaders. But his contempt for international agreements also extends to Articles 18–20 of the United Nations Universal Declaration on Human Rights, which articulates the rights to freedom of thought, conscience, religion, association and assembly." He was critical of the lack of public opposition to Akinola's actions, contrasting "this silence with the cacophony that followed the Episcopal Church's decision to consecrate" the Robinson.

== See also ==
- List of Succession of Bishops for the Episcopal Church, USA

Episcopal Church (USA) titles
Preceded by Ronald H. Haines	Bishop of the Episcopal Diocese of Washington; 2002–2011	Succeeded by Mariann Budde
