= Burwash Hall =

Residence hall at Victoria University, Toronto

Coordinates: 43°40′02″N 79°23′28″W

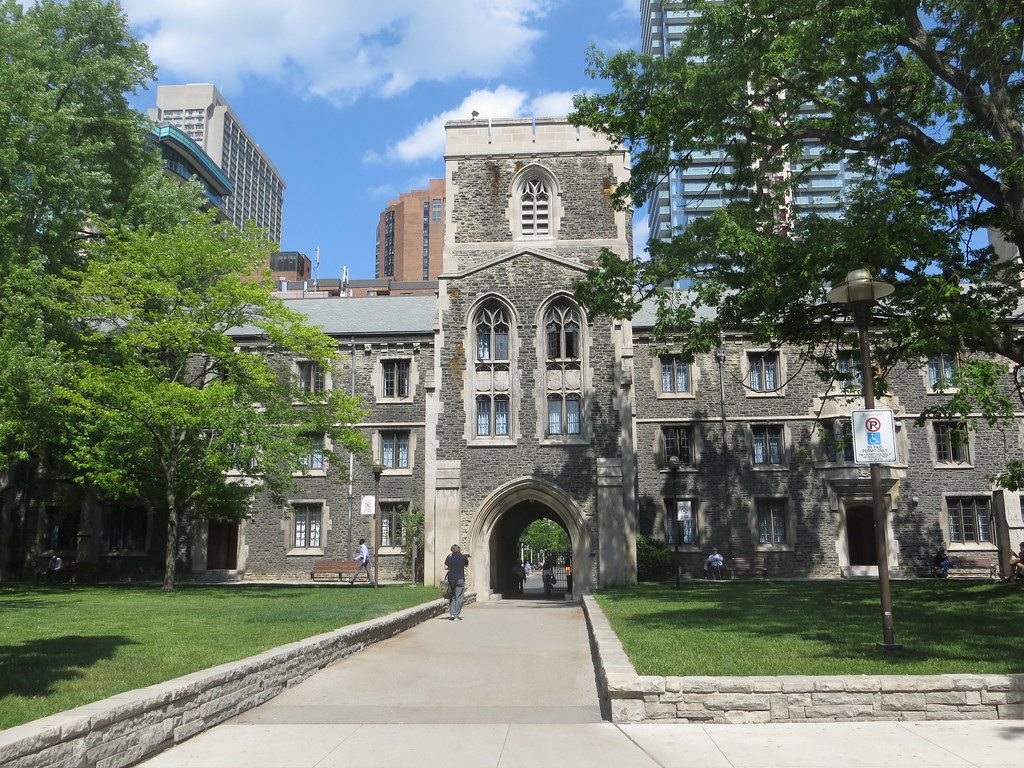

General information
- Type: Residence hall
- Architectural style: Collegiate Gothic
- Location: 89 Charles St. West, Toronto, Ontario, Canada
- Completed: 1913

Design and construction
- Architect: Henry Sproatt

Other information
- Public transit: at Museum

Burwash Hall refers to both Burwash Dining Hall and Burwash Hall proper, the second oldest of the residence buildings at Victoria University in Toronto, Ontario, Canada. It is located on the Victoria University campus within the northeastern portion of the University of Toronto's greater St. George campus. Construction began in 1911 and was completed in 1913. It was named after Nathanael Burwash, president of Victoria from 1887 to 1912. The building is an intricate Neo-Gothic work with turrets, gargoyles, and battlements. The architects were Messrs. Sproatt & Rolph.

== History ==
In 1910, seven years after the opening of the women's residence, Annesley Hall, the administrators of Victoria University began plans for an elaborate men's residence building on the campus. The project was funded by the estate of Mr. Hart A. Massey, an alumnus from Victoria's early days in Cobourg. The full cost of the project is unknown to the public, but the asset was valued at $450,000 in 1913.

Burwash Hall in 1926 (Victoria University Archives).

Famous residents of Burwash include Vincent Massey, Lester B. Pearson, Don Harron, and Donald Sutherland.

== Architecture ==
The building is described as Collegiate Gothic, intended to include all the developments of the Tudor style. Burwash Hall was designed to resemble the residences in Oxford and Cambridge, with modifications to the stair-case system and the division of houses. Sproatt & Rolph avoided architecture of commercial appearance, envisioning a structure that was academic in feeling. Burwash Hall was not intended to replicate Oxford buildings, but to "prove that academic Gothic can be indigenous in Canada as well as in England, and that it can be perfectly adapted to the exigencies of [Canada's] climate and life". Constructed of Bedford Indiana cut stone and Georgetown rubble masonry, the residence houses and adjoined dining hall intended to prove that beauty and efficiency were not antithetical.

== Design ==
Burwash Dining Hall in 1926 (Victoria University Archives).

The building is divided between the large dining hall in the northwest and the student residence proper. The residence area is divided into two sections: the Upper Houses, built in 1913, and the Lower Houses, built in 1931.

To the west the Upper Houses look out on the Vic Quad and the main Victoria College building across it. West of the Lower Houses is the new Lester B. Pearson Garden of Peace and International Understanding and the E.J. Pratt Library beyond it. From the eastern side of the building, the Upper Houses look out at Rowell Jackman Hall and the Lower Houses see the St. Michael's College residence of Elmsley. The only exception is the view from Gate House Tower which looks down St. Mary's Street.

== Burwash Dining Hall ==
The dining hall is perhaps the best known part of the building to outsiders. It is the University of Toronto's largest, holding some 250 students and sixteen large tables. Hanging on the western wall is Queen Victoria's burial flag, given to the college soon after her death. Under the flag is the high table where the professors and college administration lunch. Historically, the Upper Houses each had their own table. Gate sat in the southwest corner, Middle sat in the far northeast, South sat in the table to the west of Middle, while North sat to the west of the southeast corner. The only lower house to have had a designated table was Caven, in the northwest corner beside the alumni table. (Note that prior to the 1995 renovations, some of these houses, particularly North and Caven, 'traditionally' sat elsewhere).

== Upper Houses ==
Adjoined to Burwash Dining Hall and completed in 1913, the upper houses were originally known as the Men's Residences. The four houses are: North House, Middle House, Gate House, and South House. The upper houses were gutted and renovated in 1995.

Each Upper House consists of three floors. The lower floor contains a common room equipped with kitchen facilities, couches and a television. The upper floors each have their own kitchen and dining area. All houses have a very high bathroom ratio, with many single-use washrooms and a communal washroom on each floor. Upper Houses are divided between double rooms and singles, with about sixty percent of the population being in doubles. Unlike the Lower Houses, the hallways of each Upper House are connected, a feature that was added in the 1995 renovations.

There is typically an upper-year Residence Don for each of the Upper Houses. This has been the case since the building's construction in 1913, when specific rooms were included for Dons. The original location of these rooms has since changed with recent renovations.

=== North House ===
At the corner of Burwash Dining Hall and the Upper Houses lies North House. The emblem of North House is an oil lamp, originally used to represent Victoria's Faculty of Theology, established in 1871. North has an extended hallway and larger common room than the other Upper Houses due to its position on the corner of the building.

=== Middle House ===
The largest of the Upper Houses due to its incorporation of two battlements which divide North and Gate House, Middle House is the centre of the Upper Houses. The owl is the emblem of Middle House, sourced from the Victoria College coat of arms, and originally used to represent the Faculty of Arts. The Don's room in Middle House was originally the room reserved for the Dean of Men at Victoria, fit with a fireplace and seating area.

=== Gate House ===
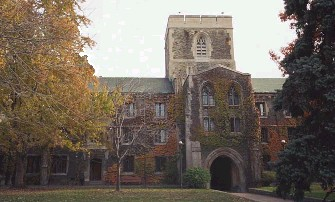
Gate House viewed from the Vic Quad.

Gate House is one of the four Upper Houses of the Burwash Hall residence. Until 2007, when Victoria administration made it co-ed, Gate House was one of the last remaining all-male residence building in the University of Toronto. The Gate House emblem is the Phoenix, visible in the bottom-right corner of the Victoria College insignia.

Gate House, with the rest of Upper Burwash, opened in 1913 and has held students every year since then except 1995, when it was renovated. As an all-male residence from 1913 to 2007 it held a number of unique traditions. For 20 years Gate House hosted an annual party called Novemberfest in the Burwash dining hall. The Victoria Dean of Students cancelled Novemberfest in 2003, when police discovered widespread underage drinking and over 800 people in the dining hall, in violation of the fire code. Another Gate House tradition that no longer occurs is the "stirring the chicken," a dinner and keg party where house members cook chicken fajitas for hundreds of guests. Until 2007, Gate House held secretive first-year initiation ceremonies called Traditionals, which involved writing slogans on campus buildings in chalk, singing songs to the all-women's residence (who would then sing back to them), and leading first-years around the house blindfolded. Since Novemberfest, Gate House continued to have conflict with the Administration. In 2004 the Dean evicted three Gate House residents for allegedly "hog-tying" a first-year student. In 2007 President Paul W. Gooch wrote that Gate House undertook an "escalating series of actions" that were "defiant" and "disparaging of women", in response to Gate members constructing a 2.5-metre snow penis and placing a cooked pig's head in an Annesley bathroom. As punishment, during the fall exam period Gooch evicted two residents and relocated the remainder of Gate House to other places in the residence system, banned all current Gate House students from entering the building in 2008. Since this decision Gate House has become a co-ed residence identical to the other Upper Burwash houses. Notable residents of Gate House include Lester B. Pearson, former Prime Minister of Canada, and Simon Pulsifer, who Time magazine nicknamed "The Duke of Data" for his contributions to Wikipedia.

During its 93 years as a men's residence, Gate House developed a distinct character and reputation. These antics included pranks, toga parties, streaking, caroling to other residences, hazing rituals, "beer bashes" and "incessant pounding" on the Gate House table in the dining hall. Paul Gooch wrote that these traditions gave Gate House an "ethos" that contradicted his vision of residence life.

The all-male Gate House was known as a social centre and spirited, tight-knit community. According to Grayson Lee, who created the snow penis sculpture in 2007, most of its residents were "heartbroken" to leave. Former Gate House President Dave Ruhl commented that "the Gate House camaraderie is unique" and that living there was "one of the most important parts of the university experience" for many.

The Reuters news agency nicknamed Gate House "U of T's Animal House" because Donald Sutherland's memories of its parties are said to have influenced the script of the 1978 movie. The Toronto Star described Gooch's decision to put an end to its traditions, activities and distinguishing characteristics as "neutering Animal House."

Gate House has three floors which house 28 students, as well as a don and the Victoria College Residence Life Co-ordinator. Above the gate there is a tower that rises three stories higher and has a turret-style roof.

The first floor has one double room and one bathroom available to students. About half of the floor is taken up by the apartment of the Residence Life Coordinator. Lastly, on the first floor there is a house common room with a kitchen and two couches. The second floor has three double rooms and seven single rooms. It has three single washrooms and one larger communal one, as well as its own kitchen. This floor is home to the residence don, who has a larger room with a private washroom. The third floor is identical to the second except that in place of the don's room there are two single rooms.

=== South House ===
Adjoining St. Mary's Arch and Lower Houses, South House is the furthest Upper House from Burwash Dining Hall. The emblem of the house is a sphinx, which was originally used to represent Victoria's Faculty of Law, established in 1860.

== Lower Houses ==
The Lower Houses, originally the Emmanuel College Residences, were intended to house theology students at Emmanuel College, whose current building was opened the same year. Ryerson House (renamed to First House in 2021), Nelles House, Caven House, Bowles-Gandier House are now mostly home to undergraduate arts and science students. One story lower than the Upper Houses, they consist of four floors in order to reach the same height. All five houses are connected underground via the basement. The lower houses have only been partially upgraded. Before the renovations the entire building was exclusively male, but now every house is co-ed.

The Lower Houses each have four floors, but are much narrower with each level having only four rooms. Each level also has its own kitchen, but these are much smaller than in the Upper Houses. The Lower Houses do have far larger and better fitted common rooms that are similar to the ones the Upper Houses had before the renovations. The rooms in the Lower Houses are also considered more luxurious with hardwood floors and large sizes. Rooms in the Lower Houses are more expensive, however. Until 2003 the Lower Houses were restricted to upper year students but with the double cohort of graduates from Ontario schools many of the rooms were transformed into doubles and now hold first years.

There are typically four residence dons in Lower Burwash. Each Lower House has one don living in a single room on the top floor.

=== First House (Ryerson House) ===
First House connects the Upper and Lower Houses, and was originally named after the first principal of Victoria College, Egerton Ryerson. The house was renamed for the 2021–2022 school year, after an investigation into the legacy of Ryerson and his role in the Canadian residential school system. The Victoria University Students' Administrative Council initially called for a renaming in February 2019, which was followed by the Victoria University Research Panel on the Legacy of Egerton Ryerson in 2020, and ultimately the Presidential Report on the Legacy of Egerton Ryerson in 2021 which resulted in the change.

Although the house had been named Ryerson since 1933, all five Lower Houses were temporarily named First House, Second House, Third House, Fourth House, and Fifth House from 1931 until 1933. The Board of Regents used these placeholder names until they decided upon better alternatives. In 2021, the name of Ryerson House was reverted to its original title, First House.

=== Nelles House ===
Named for Victoria principal, president, and chancellor Samuel S. Nelles, Nelles House echoes the position of Middle House amongst the Upper Houses. Like Middle, Nelles House sits between the first and third houses in the set. However, Nelles is the exact same size and shape as Ryerson and Caven House.

=== Caven House ===
The only Lower House to not be named after a Victoria College student or administrator, Caven House comes from presbyterian minister William Caven, the second principal of Knox College, Toronto. Although he was not directly involved with the affairs of Victoria, he consulted President Nathanael Burwash and Rev. Alfred Gandier about the division of Arts and Theology at Victoria. After great discussion, this spawned Emmanuel College, Victoria's Faculty of Theology. Since the Lower Houses were originally built for Emmanuel students, it is likely that this is the reason for naming the House after William Caven.

=== Bowles-Gandier House ===
==== Name ====
Bowles House is named after Victoria president and chancellor Richard Pinch Bowles, the first-cousin once-removed of Lester B. Pearson.

Gandier House is named after Alfred Gandier, the first principal of Emmanuel College.

==== Exterior Design ====
The last house in Burwash Hall has a unique style to the other three Lower Houses. Bowles-Gandier House, colloquially "BG", juts out on the West side of the Southern edge of Burwash Hall. Enclosing the residence structure along the property line where Victoria meets St. Michael's College, the house forms an L shape with the other three Lower Houses.

==== Interior Layout ====
Unlike Ryerson, Nelles, and Caven House—which are all identical in layout—Bowles-Gandier is an amalgamation of Gandier House and Bowles House, which operated independently until the 1995 renovations.

The floor plan for Bowles-Gandier varies from the other Lower Houses, with a significantly larger common room and two triple-bedrooms on the main floor: each with an in-suite kitchen and bathroom.

The Bowles and Gandier stairwells are connected by a hallway on the second, third, and fourth floors. Each of these floors has a shared kitchen, and two bedrooms at the end of each hall with a connected bathroom, much like the other Lower Houses. They also have two double-rooms in the middle of the hall, which have a connected bathroom and kitchen, meaning BG has the highest kitchen-to-student ratio in Burwash.

Bowles-Gandier is sometimes referred to as the Vic One House, since it is mostly reserved for students in the Vic One program. While not a requirement to live in BG, it has historically consisted of many Vic One students.

== See also ==
- List of University of Toronto buildings
