= Burwash (disambiguation) =

Burwash may refer to:

- Places
  - Burwash, East Sussex, England
  - Burwash, Ontario, Canada
  - Burwash Hall, second oldest of the residence buildings at Victoria College, Toronto, Ontario, Canada
  - Burwash Landing, Yukon, Canada
- People
  - Nathanael Burwash (1839–1918), Canadian Methodist minister and university administrator
  - Peter Burwash Canadian tennis player
