= John Royston Coleman =

Labor economist (1921–2016)

John Royston "Jack" Coleman (June 24, 1921 – September 6, 2016) was a labor economist, college and foundation president, television host, and author of Blue-Collar Journal.

== Early life ==
Jack Coleman was born in the town of Copper Cliff, Ontario, Canada, on June 24, 1921, the second of three children of Richard Mowbray Coleman and Mary Irene Lawson. His uncle was Major-General Sir Charlton Watson Spinks, the last Sirdar of Egypt. Coleman served on active duty in the Royal Canadian Naval Volunteer Reserve in World War II, rising to the rank of commander. Shortly after being invited to officer school, he married Mary Norrington Irwin (1922–2011), an artist and writer who was the daughter of William Andrew Irwin and granddaughter of John Fletcher McLaughlin, both academics. The couple had three sons, two daughters, and seven grandchildren.

== Career ==
Coleman earned a B.A. from Victoria University, Toronto, in 1943 and an M.A. in 1949 and Ph.D. in 1950 in economics, both from the University of Chicago. He was a professor at M.I.T. from 1949 to 1955 and at Carnegie Mellon University from 1955 to 1965, serving as dean of the Division of Humanities and Social Sciences at the latter institution for the final two years of his time there. During this period, he hosted the CBS economics program "Money Talks". He was recruited away by the Ford Foundation, where he was first Associate Director of Economic Development and Administration and later Program Officer in Charge of Social Development. He was named the 9th president of Haverford College in 1967 and led the institution until 1977, at which time he resigned over the unwillingness of the board to make the men's college co-educational. This step was eventually taken in 1980 and Coleman was awarded an honorary doctorate by Haverford the same year. While at Haverford, he also served as chairman of the board of the Federal Reserve Bank of Philadelphia. From 1977 to 1986 he was president of the Edna McConnell Clark Foundation, after which he ran a country inn in Chester, Vermont, and was actively involved in local arts and education.

== Blue-Collar Journal ==
During his time at Haverford, Coleman took a sabbatical in which he put his academic work to the test by working a variety of blue-collar jobs, including ditch-digger, garbageman, prison warden (and inmate), and "salad-and-sandwich man" at Union Oyster House. He wrote about these experiences for New York magazine and in a book, Blue-Collar Journal: A College President's Sabbatical, awarded the Athenaeum of Philadelphia Literary Award for 1974, among other honors. It was made into the 1976 television movie The Secret Life of John Chapman, starring Ralph Waite, Susan Anspach and Brad Davis.

== Honorary degrees ==
- LL.D. Beaver College, 1963
- LL.D. University of Pennsylvania, 1968
- LL.D. Gannon College, 1975
- L.H.D. Manhattanville College 1975
- L.H.D. Emory and Henry College, 1977
- L.H.D. Green Mountain College, 1984
- D.Litt. Haverford College, 1980
- D.Litt. Marlboro College, 1991
- D.S.L. Victoria University, Toronto, 1994

== Death ==
Coleman died of Parkinson's disease on September 6, 2016, aged 95.

Academic offices
Preceded by Hugh Borton	President of Haverford College; 1967–1977	Succeeded by Robert B. Stevens
