= Albert Carman =

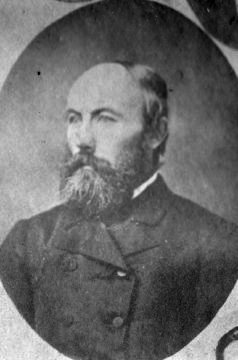
- Born: 27 June 1833; Iroquois, Upper Canada (now Ontario)
- Died: 3 November 1917 (aged 79); Toronto, Ontario, Canada
- Occupation: Methodist minister
- Known for: General Superintendent of the Methodist Church

Albert Carman (27 June 1833 – 3 November 1917) was a Canadian Methodist minister and teacher who became head of the Methodist Church in Canada.

== Early years ==
Albert Carman was born on 27 June 1833 in Iroquois, Ontario, Canada, son of Philip Carman and Emeline Shaver. His family on both sides were loyalists who settled in Matilda Township in 1784 on crown land grants after the American Revolutionary War. His father and mother were both grandchildren of soldiers of the King's Royal Regiment of New York. His father was a self-educated farmer and tanner.

Carman attended the Matilda Common School and the Dundas County Grammar School. He was admitted to Victoria College, Cobourg in 1851. Carman was converted in the winter of 1854, and was encouraged by his father to join the Methodist Episcopal Church in Canada. Carman joined the Methodist Episcopal Church in 1857 as a probationer.

== College principal ==
Carman graduated from Victoria College in 1855, and was headmaster of Dundas County Grammar School from 1854 to 1857. In 1857 he became a professor of mathematics at the Belleville Seminary, and in 1858 he became principal of the institution. The Belleville Seminary took an evangelical and conservative position on religion. It gave a three-year course in classics, philosophy, mathematics and science to young Methodist Episcopalians, both men and women. The school was controversial to many members of the denomination, who were suspicious of learning. It struggled from lack of funding. There were only fifty students by the spring of 1861. Some supported themselves by doing jobs such as sawing wood, and others paid their fees in commodities rather than cash. Carman's father sent food to the school to help out.

Carman made the Belleville Seminary succeed through advocacy within the church and through his ability as a teacher and administrator. He was ordained a Deacon in 1859. Carman completed a master's degree in 1860. He married Mary Jane Sisk of Belleville on 19 July 1860. They had three sons and one daughter. The seminary was affiliated with the University of Toronto in 1861. Carman became a full minister in 1864. However, he had never preached on a circuit. In 1866 the Seminary became Albert College, able to grant arts degrees to male students. Women could attend undergraduate classes and obtain a diploma. By 1868 there were 190 men and 73 women at Albert College. Almost a hundred students were resident. In 1870 Carman established a faculty of divinity, and organized faculties of arts, engineering, law and music. Carman was president of Albert College until 1875.

Carman also became a member of the Senate of Victoria College, a foundation of the Wesleyan Methodists. Towards the end of his tenure at Albert College, in 1874 Carman was elected to the Council of Public Instruction. Other members included Samuel Sobieski Nelles, Egerton Ryerson and the Roman Catholic Bishop Joseph Lynch.

== Bishop ==
Between 1868 and 1874 Carman was involved in the negotiations for unity with the other Methodist churches in Canada. Talks broke down due to the Methodist Episcopal insistence on an episcopate and refusal to accept laymen in its governing bodies. Carman was elected colleague of Bishop James Richardson and ordained bishop at Napanee on 4 September 1874. He was aged 42. He was succeeded at the Albert College by Jabez R. Jacques from the American Episcopal Methodist Church. After Richardson died in March 1875 Carman was sole head of the Methodist Episcopal Church. Church members at this time were mostly rural, committed to an episcopal structure, believers in the separation of church and state and opposed to the Methodist Church of Canada. Carman tried to improve church organization and expand into urban areas and the prairies, but was not successful.

In 1878 the Methodist Episcopal Church approved lay representation, one of the main differences with the Methodist Church of Canada, and in 1882 the Methodist Church of Canada accepted the concept of being led by a strong general superintendency. Carman managed to negotiate a Basis of Union, accepted by both churches in December 1882, where two elected general superintendents would head the combined church. At a special session of the Methodist Episcopal General Conference in January 1883 Carman argued that the general superintendency would be a scriptural episcopacy. He argued for union, saying "Our great principles of doctrine, government and action can be harmonized into one Church – if they cannot, either our principles are false and wrong, or God never intended us to come together."

== General Superintendent ==
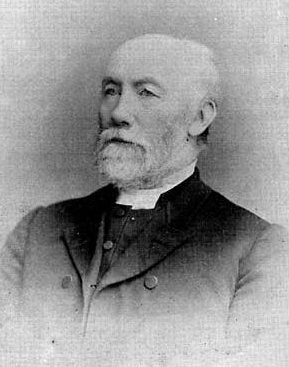
Albert Carman

In September 1883 a provisional General Conference of the uniting churches elected Carman and Samuel Dwight Rice of the Methodist Church of Canada as the general superintendents. With the union of the Methodist churches, Albert College amalgamated with Victoria College to create Victoria University in 1884. The Albert College campus again became a private secondary school. Rice died in December 1884 and his successor John Æthuruld Williams died in December 1889. After this Carman was sole general superintendent until 1910.

The Methodist General Conference of 1890 proposed to hold ongoing informal discussions about union with Congregationalists and Presbyterians, and if possible with Anglicans and Baptists. The Protestants should recognize the validity of ministries of each denomination and work together in areas such a mission work. The 1901 census showing considerable growth in the Canadian population of Roman Catholics and much smaller growth in Methodists. Carman spoke at the 1902 General Conference in favor of serious consideration of union of the Protestant churches.

Carman was authoritarian and unwilling to share power. As he grew older he became increasingly abrasive. In 1910 the General Conference elected Samuel Dwight Chown as a second general superintendent. Chown's election represented a victory of the wealthy laymen allied with liberal theologians. At the 1911 Ecumenical Methodist Conference in Toronto Carman intervened in a debate on "The Permanent Results of Biblical Criticism". The British Methodist Recorder said, "Very pathetic it was to see this veteran stand up to plead against conclusions which he deemed harmful, in the presence of an assembly which in the main accepted them." The editor said that with his extreme conservatism he was "unwillingly singing the swan song of his views." Albert Carman retired in 1914. He died on 3 November 1917.

Carman's son was Albert Richardson Carman (1865–1939), who graduated from Albert College and became a journalist with the Toronto Globe and then the Montreal Star, where he became editor-in-chief. He wrote two novels that reflected his father's social radicalism. One was The Preparation of Ryerson Embury (1900).

== Beliefs ==
Carman supported women's education. In 1881 he was instrumental in the opening of the Alma College for women in St. Thomas. Carman was orthodox, and tried to maintain the traditional centrist position of the Methodist church. He was opposed both to ultra-conservatism and to liberal theology, both of which he considered to be divisive. He rejected the view that religion should focus on humanity rather than God, or that biblical teaching could be used selectively. He felt these attitudes were incompatible with the basic Methodist belief in the need for a continued and disciplined struggle against personal sin, and would tend to weaken Christian beliefs.

Carman believed that the Bible was the literal word of God. However, he accepted the value of education and was open to free inquiry. Although Carman spoke out against evolutionism, Higher Criticism and other modernist views, he did not stand in the way of these developments. He was in favor of social reform to make Canada a truly Christian country, but was opposed to radicals who wanted to overthrow the established order. He distrusted the wealthy laity and looked to the middle classes to take the lead in creating a more "brotherly" society. During his tenure Carman improved the administration of the Methodist Church, promoted Sabbath observance and fought evils such as dancing, gambling and alcohol. However he did not prevent, and perhaps enabled, innovation in the church's theology and evangelical tradition to meet modern requirements.

== Publications ==
- Rev. A. Carman, D.D. (1899). The Guiding Eye, or The Holy Spirit's Guidance of the Believer. Toronto: William Briggs.

== Sources ==
- "Albert Carman fonds". Archives Association of Ontario.
- "Carman, Rev. Albert". Methodist Who's Who. 1912.
- Cook, Ramsay (1985-01-01). The Regenerators: Social Criticism in Late Victorian English Canada. University of Toronto Press. ISBN 978-0-8020-6609-1.
- French, Goldwin S. (1998). "CARMAN, ALBERT". Dictionary of Canadian Biography. Vol. 14. University of Toronto/Université Laval.
- Phillips, Paul T. (1996). A Kingdom on Earth: Anglo-American Social Christianity, 1880-1940. Penn State Press. ISBN 0-271-01580-2.
- Selles, Johanna (1996-08-23). Methodists and Women's Education in Ontario, 1836-1925. McGill-Queen's Press - MQUP. ISBN 978-0-7735-1443-0.
- Semple, Neil (1996-04-16). Lord's Dominion: The History of Canadian Methodism. McGill-Queen's Press - MQUP. ISBN 978-0-7735-6575-3.
- Semple, Neil (2005-01-28). Faithful Intellect: Samuel S. Nelles and Victoria University. McGill-Queen's Press - MQUP. ISBN 978-0-7735-2759-1.
