= Orsino =

Orsino may refer to:

- Orsino, Florida, United States
- Orsino (play), a play by Romain Rolland
- Orsino (Twelfth Night), a character in the Shakespearean comedy Twelfth Night
- Orsino, the name of an elven mage in Dragon Age II

== People with the surname ==
- John Orsino (1938–2016), former Major League Baseball catcher
- Philip Orsino (1954–2024), Canadian businessman
