= Stephenson House (University of Toronto) =

Coordinates: 43.667852°N 79.389876°W

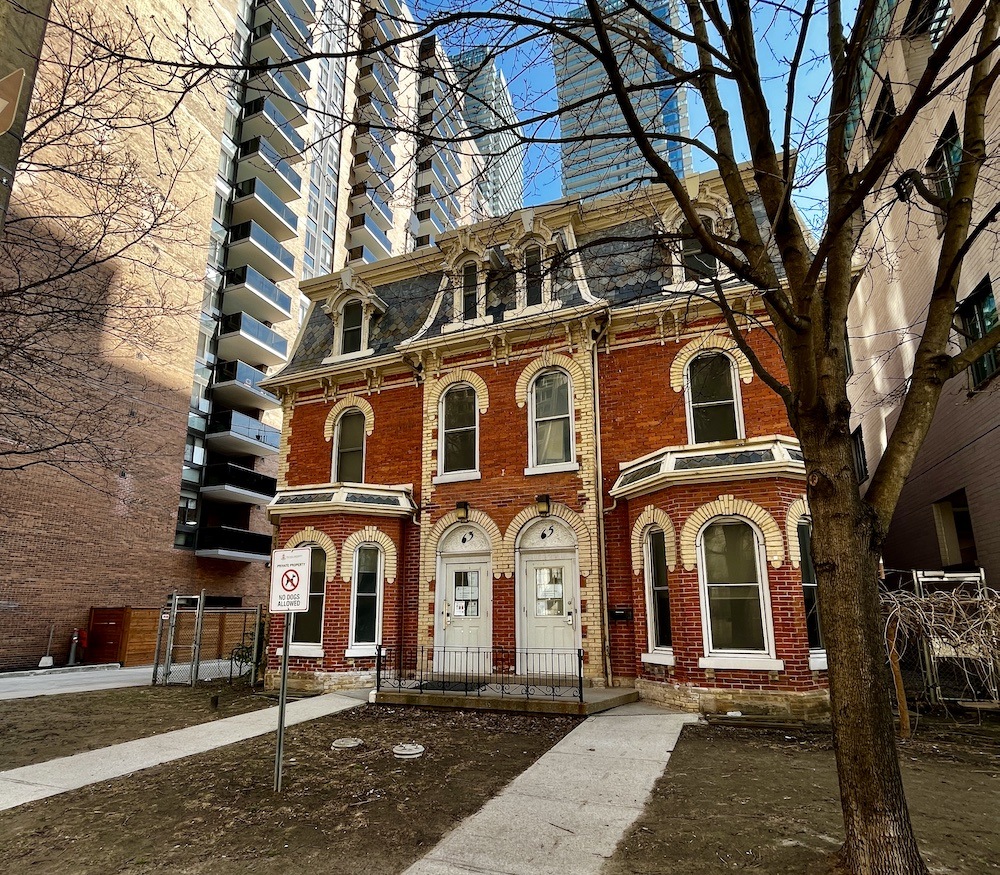
63-65 Charles St. West (2022)

Stephenson House was a community involvement residence at Victoria University in the University of Toronto. Located at 63-65 Charles Street West, the house hosted ten undergraduate students per year until 2010, when it became offices and storage space for the HR department and physical plant staff of Victoria University. As a student residence, Stephenson House was self-governed and self-regulating, with the aim of creating a living environment that supports and encourages a sense of ownership, involvement, and responsibility, both at home and in the greater community. The building has historical value as the last remaining house of the many 19th century Victorian homes on Charles Street.

== History ==
Shortly before her death in 1939, Mrs. Stephenson asked her husband Dr. Frederick Stephenson, a university professor at Emmanuel College, to "carry on, get a housekeeper, and take in some students to help out and keep in touch with young people." By July of that same year, Victoria University acquired Dr. Stephenson's collection of properties on Charles Street. Stephenson used the income of the property "to assist worthy students in Victoria College who plan to enter the ministry of the United Church of Canada for home or foreign service." One of the conditions that he established when the property transaction occurred, was that "if at any time the Board of Regents desires to use the property for any other purpose, it shall agree to set aside $35,000 to be used in establishing another cooperative house." In September 1940, an all-male Christian cooperative living space under the name of Stephenson House was created with the intent of providing housing to men with a Christian Vocation who would serve the public good.

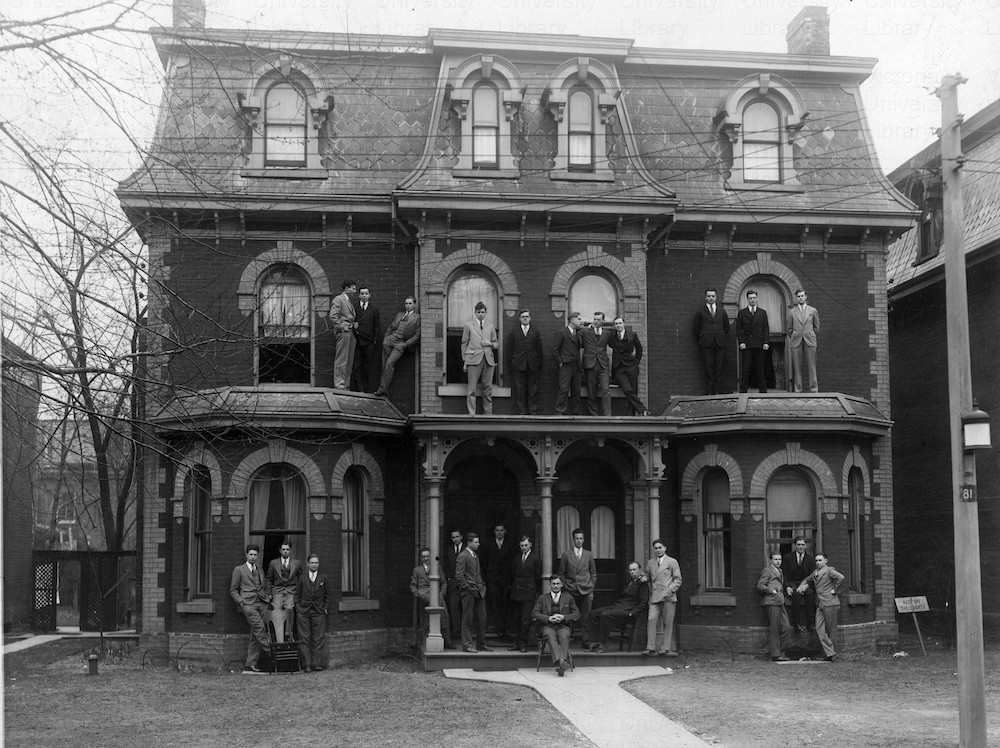
Stephenson House in 1953 - 80 St. Mary Street (Victoria University Archives)

As the first Don of the house, Dr. Stephenson encouraged residents to take care of the maintenance and upkeep of the house, which included cleaning and grocery shopping. His plan was to "plant deep in the students minds the spirit of cooperation." Over the years, ‘serving public good’ came to overshadow and replace the ‘Christian Vocation’ aspect of the House goals. With time, the House turned into a cooperative, autonomous residence, whose community-minded members were completely responsible for its regular sustenance and financial operations.

Stephenson House, as an institution, existed in several different locations. Its present location, the Charles Bird House, was built in 1884 and is a City of Toronto Heritage Property.

In the 1980s, "the house experimented by adding women to its membership."

Six men and four women constituted the final 2009-2010 population of Stephenson House. A blog was created by this cohort to replace the old stephensonhouse.ca used previously, but went out of commission. The intention of these initiatives was to make Stephenson House more accessible to the community at large.

== Locations ==
1939 - 1953 – 77 Charles Street West

1953 - 1992 – 80 St. Mary Street

1992 - 2010 – 63-65 Charles Street West (known as Stephenson/Law House for some time, with the building split into two units)

== Community Structure ==
Living costs in Stephenson House were subsidized by Victoria College in support of the community involvement of its residents. Victoria University backed the volunteer and/or advocacy work each house member was involved with. Another factor in keeping living costs under those of regular residence was that house members, as a team, were responsible for the upkeep, functioning and improving of the House. Cleaning, cooking, and other house duties were shared among the members:

- Two students had the responsibility of planning meals, shopping for food and cleaning the fridge weekly, and monitoring the kitchen upkeep
- The other eight students were split into two groups of four. One group was responsible for chores, while the other group was responsible for cooking – one person each night, Monday to Thursday. These two groups would switch roles every week. All eight non-meal planning members also had specific responsibilities towards the House, which varied between monitoring the financial functioning of the House and ensuring that there were enough cleaning supplies, etc.

== Application process ==
The yearly application process for residency at Stephenson House usually started with an Open House held at the end of February or at the beginning of March. This was followed by a period where potential applicants attend house dinners in order to meet the current House membership and ask questions about the function of Stephenson House. Shortly thereafter, written applications were due. By the end of March, decisions were made with the assistance of the dean of students at Victoria University, and applicants were informed of their status.

While candidacy for residence at Stephenson House was open to all undergraduates of the University of Toronto in its later years, "as far as possible, in selecting students who are to live in the House, preference [was] given to students of Victoria College."

== See also ==
- Burwash Hall
- Margaret Addison Hall
- Rowell Jackman Hall
- Law House
