= Nathanael Burwash =

Canadian Methodist minister and university administrator

The Reverend Nathanael Burwash FRSC
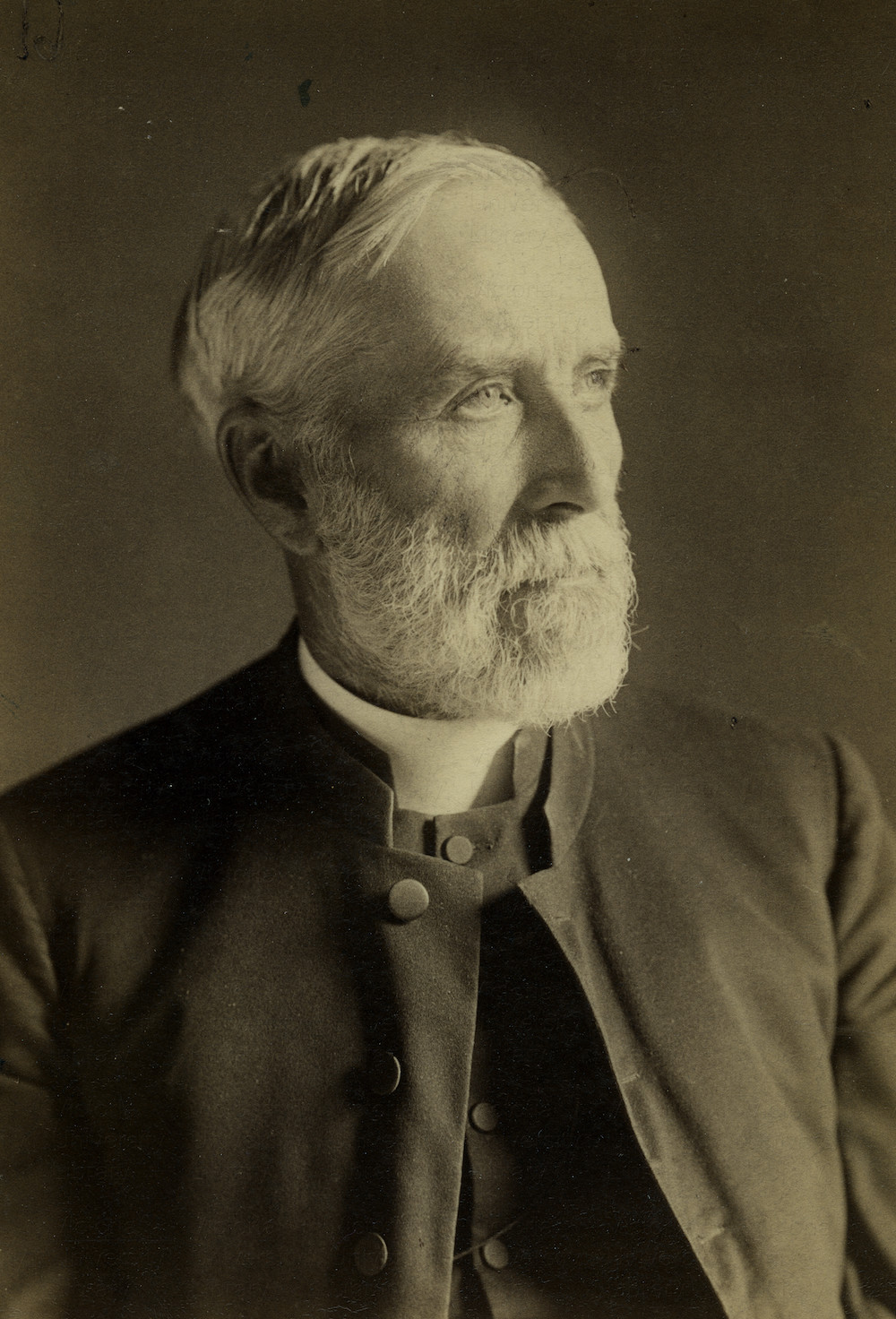
- Burwash, Victoria University Archives
- Born: 25 July 1839; St. Andrews East, Lower Canada
- Died: 30 March 1918 (aged 78); Toronto, Ontario, Canada
- Resting place: Baltimore, Ontario, Canada
- Spouse: Margaret Proctor (m. 1868)

Ecclesiastical career
- Church: Methodist Church
- Ordained: 1864

Academic background
- Education: Victoria College; Yale University; Garrett Biblical Institute

Academic work
- Discipline: Theology

Nathanael Burwash FRSC (1839–1918) was a Canadian Methodist minister and university administrator.

== Early life and education ==
Rev. Nathanael Burwash was born in St. Andrews East, Lower Canada, on 25 July 1839, the eldest son of the devout Methodists Adam Burwash and Anne Taylor. He was raised on a farm in Baltimore, Canada (a hamlet near Cobourg), to which his family moved in 1844. In 1859 he graduated with a Bachelor of Arts degree from Victoria College which was then located in Cobourg, Ontario, and was ordained by the Wesleyan Methodist Church in 1864. He later studied at Yale College and the Garrett Biblical Institute.

He married Margaret Proctor on 25 December 1868 in Sylvan, Ontario. They had four daughters and eight sons together.

== Career ==
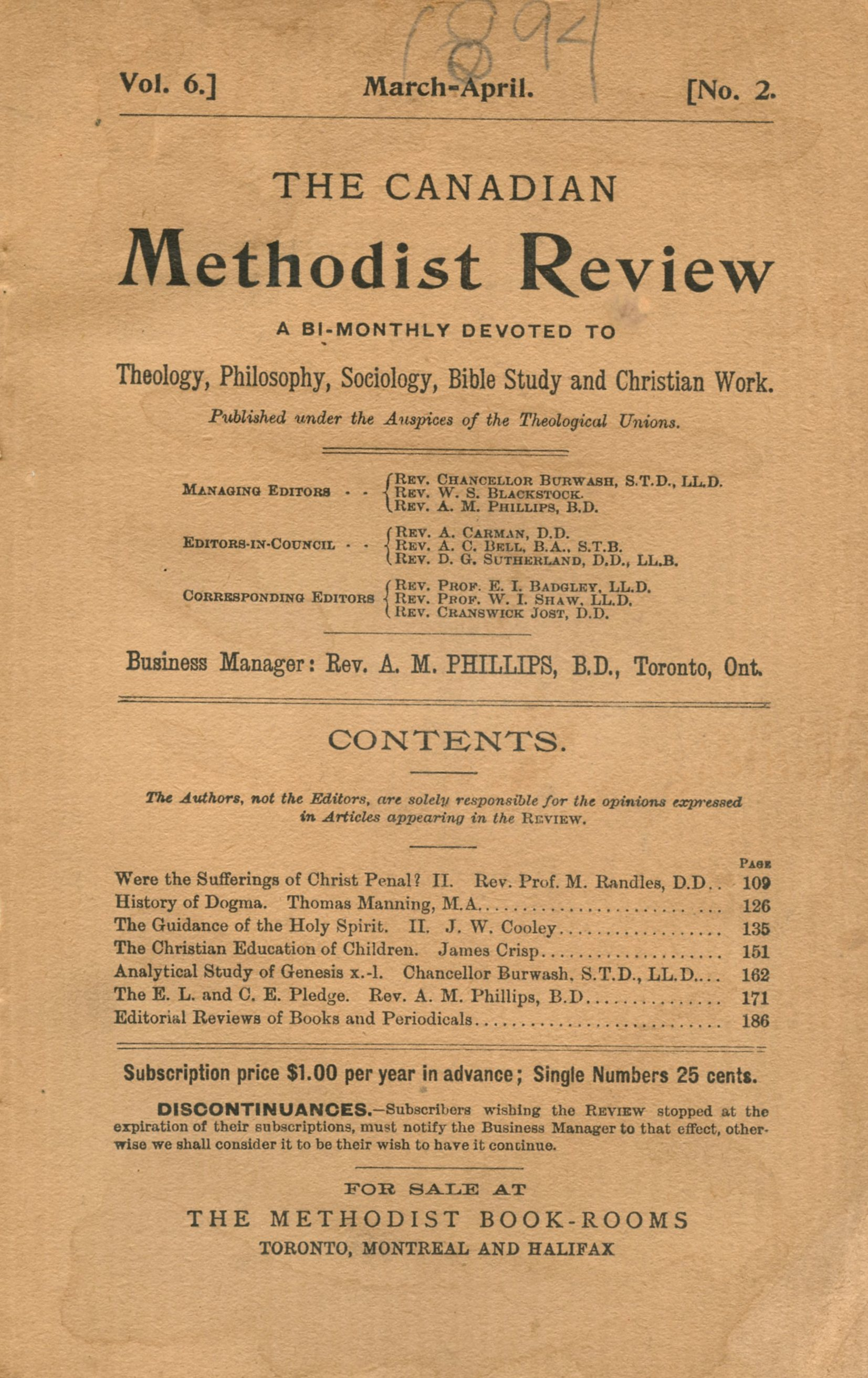
Burwash was a managing editor of The Canadian Methodist Review

In 1866, he was appointed professor of natural history and geology at Victoria College. In 1873 he became dean of theology there, and in 1887, he became chancellor and president of Victoria University, the new name of Victoria College, while retaining the deanship until 1900. He participated in the discussions which led to Victoria College's relocation from Cobourg to Toronto and its federation with the University of Toronto. He retired the university chancellorship and presidency in 1913, but continued to teach theology until his death.

He was elected president of the Methodist Church's Bay of Quinte conference in 1989 and was a participant at each general conference of the Methodist Church from 1874 to 1894. He wrote several books, including a biography of Egerton Ryerson.

Burwash Hall was named in his honour. Burwash died on 30 March 1918 in Toronto, Ontario, and was buried in Baltimore.

== Books ==
- Burwash, N. Wesley's doctrinal standards, published by W. Briggs and C.W. Coates circa 1881.
- Burwash, N. The history of Victoria College Toronto : Victoria College Press, 1927. (published after Burwash's death) xviii, 571 p., [7] leaves of plates : ill., ports.; 24 cm.
- Burwash, N. and Reynar, A. H. (Alfred Henry). Egerton Ryerson Parkman ed. Toronto : Morang, 1906. 303 p. : port.; 23 cm.

Academic offices
Preceded by Samuel Sobieski Nelles	President and Chancellor of Victoria University; 1887–1913	Succeeded by Richard Pinch Bowles
