= Matthew Richey =

The Reverend Matthew Richey DD
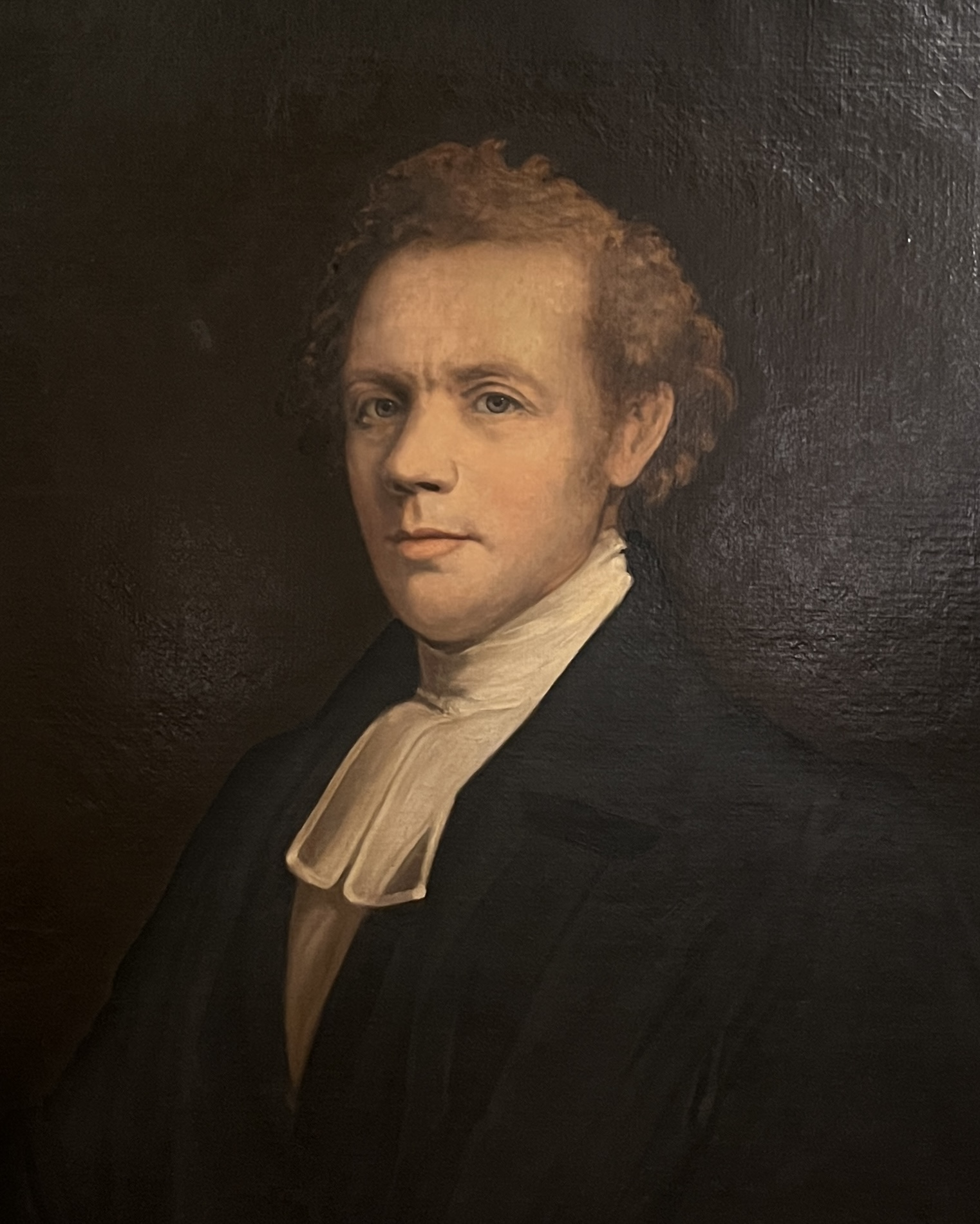
- Portrait of Richey, Victoria University, Toronto

1st President of Victoria College
- In office 1849 – 1850
- Succeeded by: Egerton Ryerson

1st Principal of Upper Canada Academy
- In office 1836 – 1840
- Succeeded by: Jesse B. Hurlburt

Personal details
- Born: May 25, 1803 Ramelton, County Donegal, Ireland
- Died: October 30, 1883 Halifax, Nova Scotia, Canada
- Spouse: Louisa Matilda Nichols (m. 1825)
- Children: 5

Matthew Richey (May 25, 1803 – October 30, 1883) was a Wesleyan Methodist minister, an educator, and an important leader in the Methodist community in Nova Scotia.

He was born in Ramelton, a small town in the north of County Donegal in Ulster, Ireland, and became a Methodist at the age of 14. In 1819 he emigrated with his brother to Saint John, New Brunswick, where he was persuaded to become a candidate for the Methodist ministry. In 1820 he was appointed an assistant at St. David's in New Brunswick by the Nova Scotia District and in 1825 was admitted as a Methodist minister.

He earned an M.A. degree from Wesleyan University in Middletown, Connecticut, in 1836 and was awarded an honorary doctorate of divinity (D.D.) degree from the same institution in 1847. In 1836 he was appointed the first principal of Upper Canada Academy in Cobourg, which became Victoria College in 1841. He held this position for four years, before returning to the pastorate in Toronto. Richey was also the first president of Victoria College from 1849 to 1850.

From 1841 to 1843 he served the Methodist church in Toronto, Kingston and Montreal. In 1849 he was appointed acting president of the Canada Methodist Conference and in 1851 became president. At his retirement in 1870 he had been chairman of the newly formed Western District and led to the formation of the Methodist Conference of Eastern British America and served as its president from 1856 to 1861 and 1867 to 1868. He had also been chairman of the Prince Edward Island District and chairman of the Saint John District.

He died at the home of his son Matthew Henry Richey who was Lieutenant Governor of Nova Scotia.
