= Alfred Gandier =

Presbyterian minister

The Reverend Alfred Gandier
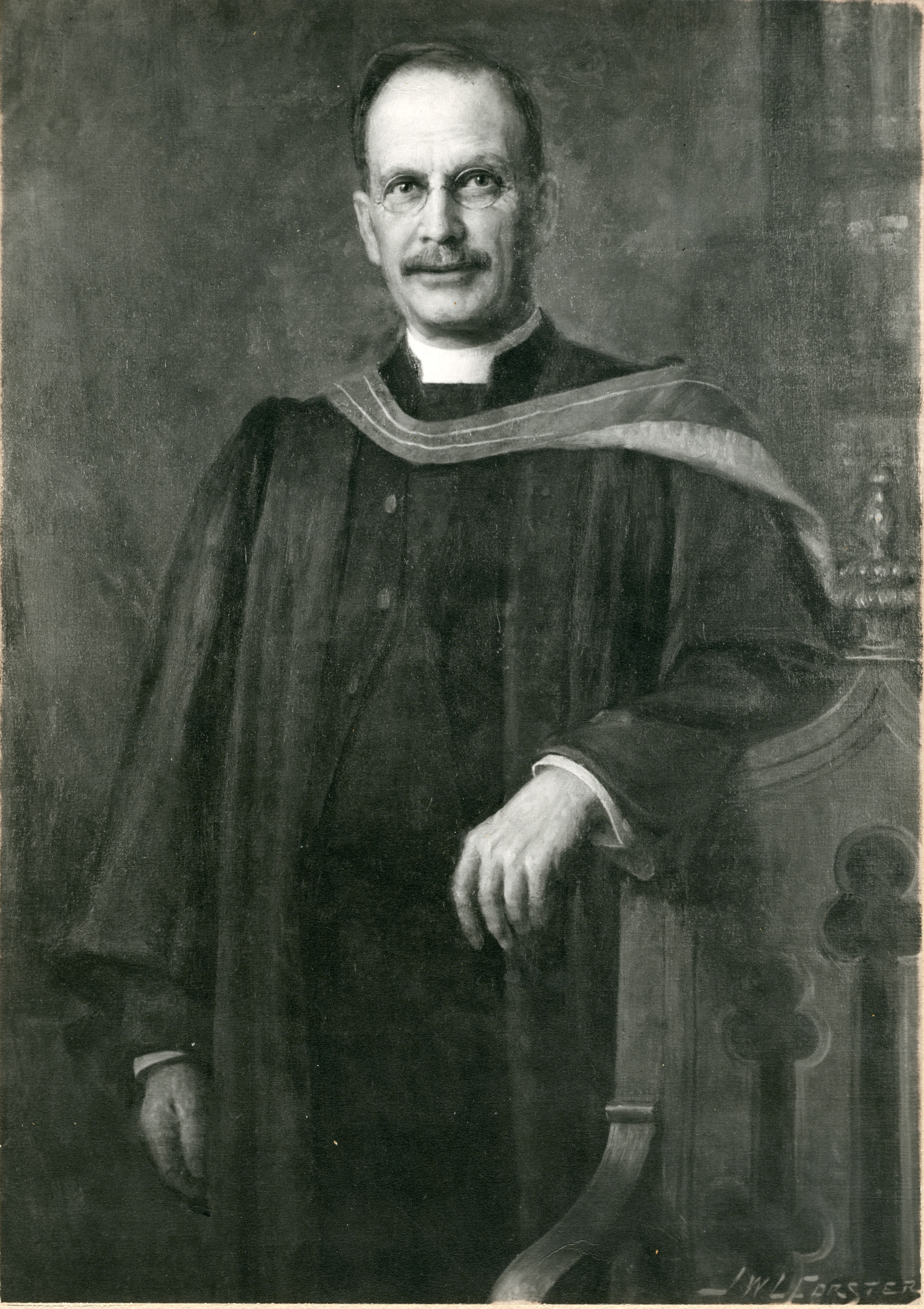
- Born: November 29, 1861; Rawdon, Hastings, Upper Canada
- Died: 13 June 1932 (aged 69); Toronto, Ontario, Canada

Alfred Gandier was a Presbyterian minister in Ontario, Canada from 1889 to 1908, son of Joseph Gandier and Helen Eastwood. He was principal of Knox College at the University of Toronto (1909-1925) before becoming the first principal of Emmanuel College, Victoria University (1928–1932).
