= John Hodgetts =

John Edwin "Ted" Hodgetts
- Born: May 28, 1917; Omemee, Ontario
- Died: May 8, 2009 (aged 91); Kingston Ontario
- Occupation: political scientist
- Awards: Order of Canada

John Edwin Hodgetts, OC FRSC (May 28, 1917 – May 8, 2009) was a Canadian political scientist who is considered the father of public administration studies in Canada.

Born in Omemee, Ontario (located near Peterborough, Ontario), he attended the University of Toronto, was a Rhodes Scholar, and graduated with a PhD from the University of Chicago in 1946.

He started teaching political science at the University of Toronto in 1943, where he remained a Professor Emeritus until his death. From 1967 to 1969, he was the Principal of Victoria College and from 1970 to 1972 he was the President of Victoria University in the University of Toronto. In 2005, he was appointed to Justice John H. Gomery's Advisory Committee to help with Phase II or the Recommendations Phase of the Gomery Commission.

In 1989, he was made an Officer of the Order of Canada for being known as "the professor whose vast knowledge and good judgement have influenced public servants in many countries". He is a Fellow of the Royal Society of Canada.

He has honorary doctorates of law from Queen's University, Carleton University, Mount Allison University and the University of Toronto.

He died of leukemia at Kingston General Hospital in Kingston, Ontario on May 8, 2009. He was 91.
