= Laure Rièse =

Canadian educator (1910–1996)

Laure Eva Rièse OC OOnt
- Born: 1910; Neuchâtel, Switzerland
- Died: March 27, 1996; Toronto, Ontario
- Education: PhD
- Alma mater: University of Toronto
- Employer: University of Toronto

Laure Eva Rièse, OC OOnt (1910 – 27 March 1996) was an academic at Victoria University, Toronto, author, poet and later a mature model.

== Early days ==
Rièse was born in Neuchâtel, Switzerland, the daughter of Frédéric Rièse and Laure Veuilleumier. She had a brother who was an architect. Rièse went to secondary school in Switzerland, and studied arts and literature at the Sorbonne in Paris before moving to Toronto in 1928 at the age of 18.

== Academic career ==
In Toronto, she became the don of Victoria University, Toronto's French house as well as teaching French while studying at the University. Rièse obtained three degrees: a Bachelor of Arts in 1933, an M.A. in 1935 and was the first female faculty member to obtain a Ph.D. from the university in 1946. Rièse was a French professor in Victoria University's French Faculty, teaching courses about French-Canadian authors and Quebec's place in la francophonie. Being a female professor at an institution such as the University of Toronto in the 1930s was exceptional; however she had to do different things because she was a woman and almost the same age as her students, at least at first. It is important to realize that although she wore more masculine clothing, she never thought of herself as masculine; she just found it easier to wear 'boyish' clothing than 'girlish' clothing.

=== Students' comments ===
Former students of hers interviewed in a documentary claimed that she was a very strict teacher. Margaret Bond, who was in Rièse's French class in 1947, said that because she had a seating plan and knew everyone, students were motivated to keep up in her class. Another student of hers in 1949 by the name of Roy Shatz spoke about how she looked fierce but if you volunteered to answer questions before being prompted she would be less so. Other comments mentioned that if students were late she would glare at them, and they would never be late again. There is also the story of students staying outside of the classroom door to avoid her glare while still being able to hear the lessons. Rièse retired from teaching at University of Toronto in 1976, though she never truly left Victoria, the university granting her an office even after her retirement.

== Modeling career ==
After Rièse's retirement from Victoria, she became a mature model, posing in advertising campaigns across Canada. The most noted ones are a campaign that appeared on Toronto Transit Commission bus stops which had Rièse posing with an elder gentleman, whom she knew nothing about other than his name, an advertisement for the Bank of Montreal and a makeup advertisement in Quebec. Rièse really enjoyed being a model; she believes the reason for this was that she always wanted to be an actor, as was evident in her great support for drama and the arts in Toronto.

== Honours ==
She was an active member of the community, participating in numerous organizations such as the "Alliance Française de Toronto", where she was honorary president, and the "Canadian Suisse Cultural Association", where she was chair. She published many articles and poetry anthologies. She received many awards from various countries: Chevalier de la Légion d'Honneur in France (1971), Ordre des Palmes académiques, Officier d'Instruction Publique, Officer of the Order of Canada, Order of Ontario and Dame of the Order of Saint Lazarus of Jerusalem.

The École élémentaire Laure-Rièse, a school in Toronto's French public system, is named after her. Students there knew her as "Tante Laure."

Rièse died in Toronto on 27 March 1996.

== Bibliography ==
- van Rijn, Nicholas (1996-03-30). "Prof Rièse won many prestigious honours". Toronto Star. p. A12.
