= Blake Goldring =

Canadian business leader, philanthropist, and entrepreneur (born 1958)

Blake Goldring CM OOnt MSM CD
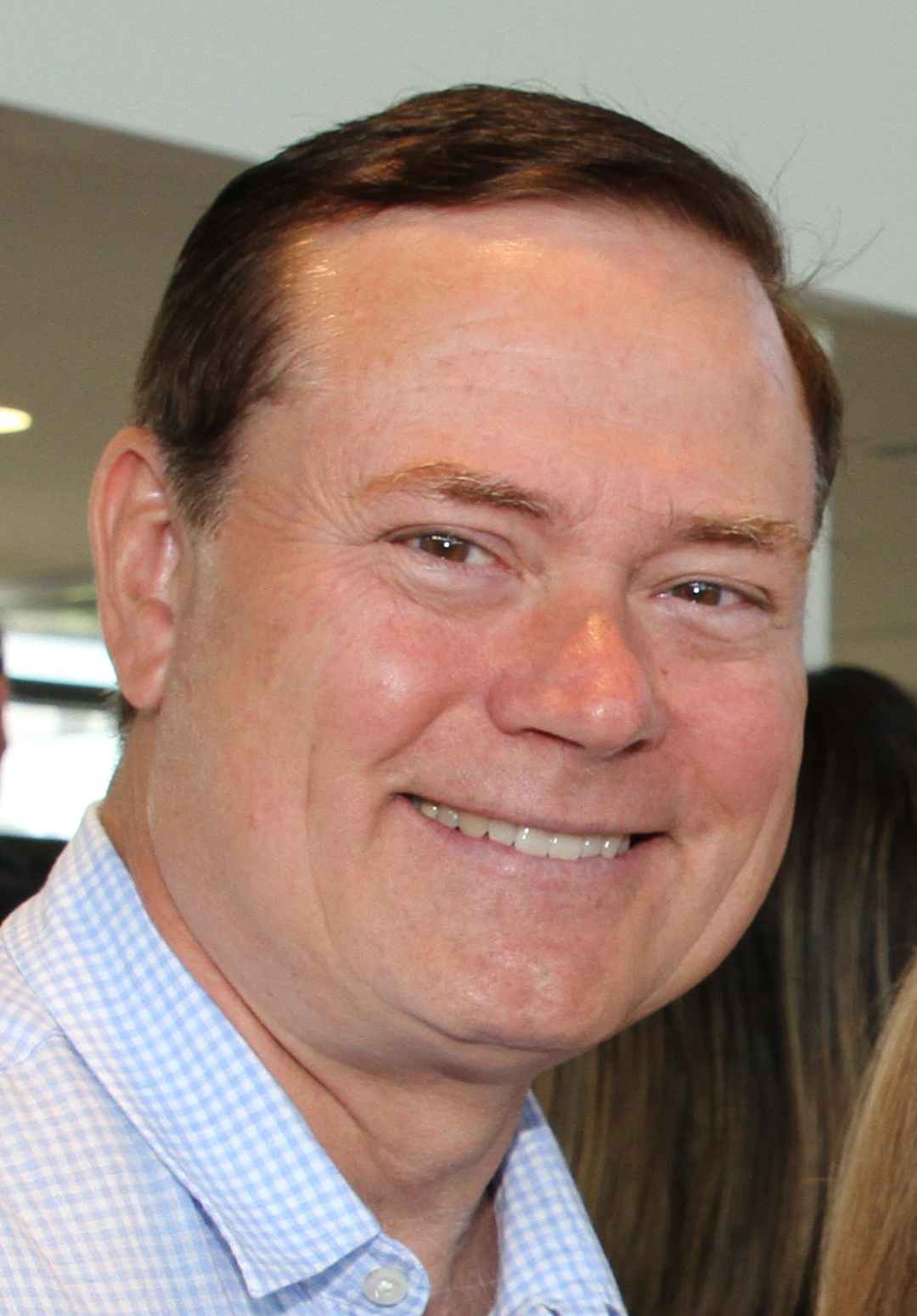
- Goldring in 2017
- Born: September 13, 1958 (age 68); Toronto, Ontario, Canada
- Education: University of Toronto, INSEAD
- Occupations: Executive Chairman of AGF Management Limited, businessman, entrepreneur, philanthropist
- Spouse: Belinda (Priebe) Goldring

Blake Charles Goldring (born September 13, 1958) is a Canadian businessman, philanthropist, and entrepreneur. He is the executive chairman of AGF Management Limited, a Canadian investment management firm. As of 2025, AGF has approximately $53 billion in assets under management.

Goldring is also the chairman of Canada Company: Many Ways to Serve, a non-partisan organization he founded in 2006 to bring together community leaders across Canada to support the Canadian military and their families.

== Early life and education ==
Goldring was born on September 13, 1958, in Toronto, the second eldest of five children born to C. Warren Goldring and Barbara (Dowd) Goldring. He attended St. Andrew's Junior High and York Mills Collegiate Institute in Toronto.

Goldring attended Victoria College at the University of Toronto, graduating with an honours degree in Economics. In his fourth year, he became the National Vice President of AIESEC. Following this, he transferred to McGill University to complete his undergraduate degree. He earned a Master of Business Administration [MBA] from INSEAD in 1982.

He became a Fellow of the Institute of Canadian Bankers (FICB) in 1984 and earned the Chartered Financial Analyst (CFA) designation in 1996.

He received an honorary Doctor of Laws degree from the Royal Military College in 2008. He also received an Honorary Doctorate of Humane Letters from Victoria University, Toronto in 2021 and an Honorary Doctorate of Laws from the University of Toronto in 2024.

== Career ==
=== Early career ===
After graduating from INSEAD, Goldring joined the Bank of Montreal (BMO), working in international and corporate banking.

=== Career at AGF ===
In late 1987, Goldring joined AGF. He held various positions, including analyst, regional sales manager, and head of sales and marketing. He was named president and chief operating officer in 1997, chief executive officer in 2000, and chairman and chief executive officer in 2006. He transitioned to the role of executive chairman in 2018.

During his tenure, AGF acquired several wealth management firms and built and sold AGF Trust and Unisen. He also oversaw the merger of NCL Investments into Smith & Williamson. Goldring led the development of four strategic investment platforms at AGF.

== Community involvement ==
=== Honorary Colonel appointments ===
Goldring served as Honorary Colonel of The Royal Regiment of Canada (2005-2011) and as the first Honorary Colonel of the Canadian Army (2011-2017).

Canada Company: Many Ways to Serve Goldring founded Canada Company: Many Ways to Serve in 2006. The organization supports the Canadian military and their families through various initiatives, including scholarships for children of fallen soldiers and the Military Employment Transition (MET) Program.

Other community involvement Goldring believes in giving back to his community and supports initiatives related to the arts, education, health and the Canadian military. He has experience sitting on a number of private and not-for-profit boards. He is Chair of the C.D. Howe Board of Directors, Past Chair of SIMA (formerly the Investment Funds Institute of Candid) and Co-Chaired Toronto's Economic and Cultural Recovery Advisory Group. Goldring is also past Director of The Canadian Film Centre and past Vice-Chair of the Toronto Symphony Orchestra. He is past Director of the Libraries and Archive of Canada Foundation, past Director of The World Wildlife Fund and a past Member of the United Way Cabinet, building on a long family history of supporting the United Way. He is active in the University of Toronto alumni community and has supported various programs and initiatives.

== Awards and recognition ==
Goldring has received numerous awards and recognitions, including the AIESEC Canada Hall of Fame (2003), the Person of Influence Award (2007), the University of Toronto Arbour Award (2009), the Meritorious Service Medal, the B'nai B'rith Award of Merit (2011), the Queen's Diamond Jubilee Medal (2012), the Order of the Diocese of Toronto (2013), the Vimy Award (2014), the Canadian Forces' Decoration (2017), the Order of Canada (2018), and the Order of Ontario (2024). He received the King Charles III Coronation Medal in 2025.

== Coat of arms ==
Coat of arms of Blake Goldring
Notes Granted by the Canadian Heraldic Authority on 15 August 2023. Crest A demi-griffin Or charged on its flank with a Latin cross grasping in its dexter claw a sword and in its sinister claw a torch enflamed Gules. Escutcheon Azure five rings interlaced in annulus on a chief Or a bee volant Proper between two roses Gules seeded Or. Motto Prodesse Et Procedere (trans. "To Serve And Succeed").

== Personal life ==
Goldring lives in Toronto with his wife and three daughters.
