= William Andrew Irwin =

Canadian educator

William Andrew Irwin (6 December 1884, in Ontario, Canada – April 1967, in Bethesda, Maryland, USA), was a Canadian educator.

He was Professor of Old Testament Languages and Literature at the University of Chicago and the Southern Methodist University, Wheaton, Maryland, where his papers can be found today. He earned a B.A., M.A., and B.D. from Victoria University, Toronto.

== Selected books ==
- The Old Testament, Keystone of Human Culture (New York: Henry Schuman, 1952).
- The Problem of Ezekiel (Chicago: University of Chicago Press, 1943).
- (With I. M. Price et al.) The Ancestry of our English Bible (New York: Harper and Brothers, 1949).
- (With H. Frankfort et al.) The Intellectual Adventure of Ancient Man (Chicago: University of Chicago Press, 1946).
- (With J.M.P. Smith) The Prophets and their Times (Chicago: University of Chicago Press, 1941).
- (Festschrift) Edward C. Hobbs, ed. A Stubborn Faith: Papers on Old Testament and Related Subjects Presented to Honor William A. Irwin (Dallas: Southern Methodist University Press, 1956).
