= Nick Saul =

Canadian food and social justice activist and author

Nick Saul CM
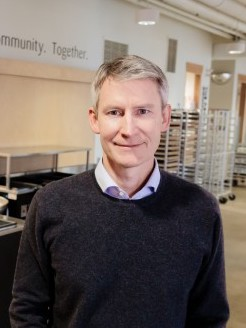

16th Chancellor of Victoria University, Toronto
- In office May 14, 2020 – June 30, 2026
- President: William R. Robins; Rhonda McEwen
- Preceded by: Carole Taylor
- Succeeded by: Steve Paikin

Personal details
- Born: August 9, 1966 (age 60) Tanzania
- Spouse: Andrea Curtis

Academic background
- Education: Victoria College, Toronto; Warwick University

Nick Saul CM (born August 9, 1966) is a Canadian food and social justice activist, author, and the president and CEO of Right To Food. He served as the 16th chancellor of Victoria University in the University of Toronto from 2020 to 2026.

== Early life ==
Saul was born in Tanzania where his parents taught and studied at the University of East Africa in Dar es Salaam, and were active in the liberation struggles of the Southern African states. The family moved back to Canada in 1972. Saul completed his undergraduate studies in history at Victoria College in the University of Toronto and his master's studies in sociology at Warwick University in the UK, where he was a Commonwealth Scholar.

== Career ==
After graduating in 1993, Saul became a community organizer, working with public housing tenants in Alexandra Park (the first conversion of a public housing community into a co-operative in Canada) and homeless men on the east side of Toronto.

In 1998, Saul became the Executive Director of The Stop Community Food Centre. He and his staff transformed the under-resourced food bank into an internationally-recognized organization, with programs promoting food skills, access, education, and engagement.

In September 2012, Saul left The Stop with a group of colleagues to launch Community Food Centres Canada (CFCC). In 2025, CFCC rebranded to Right To Food.

Right To Food is a national organization that provides resources to partner organizations across Canada to establish Community Food Centres. Community Food Centres provide healthy food access (e.g., community meals, community gardening), food skills programs, and education and engagement programs (e.g., one-on-one support and referrals, participation in national policy campaigns).

As of July 2026, there are eighteen Community Food Centres across Canada in Toronto, Perth, Stratford, Winnipeg, Dartmouth, Calgary, Hamilton, Eel Ground First Nation, Montreal, Kamloops, Nelson, Iqaluit, and Birch Lake.

Right To Food also strengthens the broader community food sector, and works with organizations within the broader food movement to advocate for a fair food system.

== Awards ==
- Jane Jacobs' Prize, 2008
- The Golden Jubilee Medal, 2012
- Honorary Doctor of Laws degree, Faculty of Community Services, Toronto Metropolitan University, 2016
- Order of Canada, 2019
- Arrell Global Food Innovation Award (awarded to CFCC)

== Works ==
=== The Stop ===
In 2013, Saul and his wife, Andrea Curtis, published The Stop: How the Fight for Good Food Transformed a Community and Inspired a Movement with Random House. The book was also published by Melville House in the U.S. The book details how Saul transformed The Stop from a food bank to a community hub, and how this transformation became the catalyst for a national Community Food Centre program. Saul and Curtis use this experience to argue the need for an overhaul of the food charity system to one rooted in food justice that empowers low-income communities. The book received multiple accolades including:

- Finalist, OLA Evergreen Award, 2014
- Finalist, Toronto Book Awards, 2014
- Finalist, Heritage Toronto Award, 2014
- Winner, Taste Canada Awards: English-language Culinary Narratives Category, 2014
