= John Clay Coleman =

American minister

The Reverend John Clay "J.C." Coleman
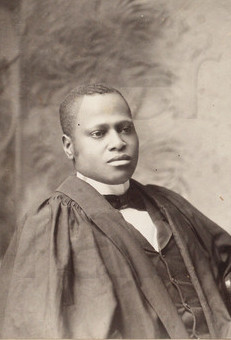
- Coleman in 1897, Victoria University Archives
- Born: February 1, 1871; Durant, Holmes Co., Mississippi
- Died: March 1, 1911 (aged 40); Spokane, Washington
- Citizenship: Canadian
- Education: Victoria University
- Spouse(s): Hattie E. Johnson, 1894

Rev. John Clay (J.C.) Coleman was an American–Canadian minister, theologian, and black rights activist. Born to freed slaves in Durant, Holmes Co., Mississippi. He travelled to Canada seeking Christian ordination, and was ordained by the African Methodist-Episcopal Church. Coleman was accepted as the "first coloured student" at Victoria University, Toronto, Canada. In 1898 he published a book titled The Jim Crow Car: Denouncement of Injustice Meted Out to the Black Race, condemning the racial atrocities of the American South.

== Biography ==
Coleman was one of seven children born in 1871 to Peter Coleman and Rowena Harrington, both of whom had been slaves on Tome Bigbee River, Alabama before being sold to a plantation owner in Mississippi.

He was raised in a Methodist Christian family, passionate about scripture and the education of youth.

== Career ==
Coleman was ordained by Bishop H. M. Turner in 1895 at the Annual Conference of the A. M. E. Church, before enrolling as a divinity student at Victoria College, Toronto. Coleman was accepted as the "first coloured student" at Victoria University, Toronto, ON, where he was a member of the 1897-98 Specialist Class of Theology.

He vocally condemned racial segregation in the American south, writing and preaching on the subject in the US and Canada. Coleman contributed extensively to the efforts of the Methodist Church and held administrative positions of authority, notably:

- Presiding Elder and General Superintendent of the A.M.E. Church in the Maritime Provinces of Canada
- Chairman at the meeting of "white Methodist preachers" in Halifax in 1903–04
- Invited by the Governor of Nova Scotia to serve on the 1901 Reception Committee of the Duke and Duchess of Cornwall and York
- Wrote content for the thirty-two volume Canadian Encyclopedia of African Methodism in Canada

In 1898 he published The Jim Crow Car; Or, Denouncement of injustice meted out to the black race in Toronto. The text outlines the harms of Jim Crow legislation in the United States. An article in The Buffalo News from 1899 described the book as a "protest against the treatment of the colored man in the South, especially on railways, where he is compelled to sit in a car set apart for his use".
