= John Fletcher McLaughlin =

John Fletcher McLaughlin (1863–1933) was Professor of Oriental Languages and Literature at Victoria University, Toronto from 1892–1932, Dean of the Faculty of Theology there from 1920 to 1928, and founding registrar of Emmanuel College, Toronto. He was a graduate of "Vic" and the University of Oxford.
