= Philip Orsino =

Canadian businessman

Philip S. Orsino
- Born: June 21, 1954; Toronto, Ontario
- Died: October 22, 2024 (aged 70); Toronto, Ontario
- Occupation: Businessman
- Known for: President and Chief Executive Officer of Masonite International Corporation

Philip S. Orsino, OC (born June 21, 1954) is a Canadian businessman. He is the former president and chief executive officer of Masonite International Corporation.

Born in Toronto, Ontario, he received a Bachelor of Arts degree in 1976 from the University of Toronto's Victoria College. He became a Chartered Accountant in 1979 and later a partner in the firm of Hilborn, Ellis, Grant, Chartered Accountants. He was made a fellow of the Institute of Chartered Accountants in 1997.

In 1983, he co-founded Century Wood Door Limited and became the president and CEO in 1984. In 1989, it merged with its largest competitor, Premdor. In 2001, it acquired Masonite Corporation from International Paper and changed its name in 2002 to Masonite International Corporation. Masonite International was purchased by Kohlberg Kravis Roberts & Co. in December 2004 for C$3.1 billion.

He is a former member of the board of directors of the Bank of Montreal for 22 years where he served as Chair of the audit committee and member of the conduct review committee. He was also Chairman of the Board of Trustees of University Health Network until 2009. Today Philip serves as a Trustee on the UHN Foundation Board.

He is the author of Successful Business Expansion: Practical Strategies for Planning Profitable Growth (1994, ISBN 0-471-59737-6).

In 2011, he was appointed president of JELD-WEN, Inc., as part of a partnership with ONEX, a Canadian equity investment firm.

== Honours ==
- In 1992, he was named the American Marketing Association's Business-to-Business Marketer of the Year.
- In 1998, he was named Ontario's Entrepreneur of the Year in the Manufacturing sector.
- In 2002, he received the 2002 Rotman Distinguished Business Alumni Award from the University of Toronto's Rotman School of Management.
- In 2003, he was made an Officer of the Order of Canada.
- In 2003, he was named Canada's Outstanding CEO of the Year Award.
- The Philip S. Orsino Cell Therapy Facility at Toronto's University Health Network is named in his honour.
