= Annesley Hall =

Residence hall of Victoria College, Toronto

Coordinates: 43°40′04″N 79°23′35″W

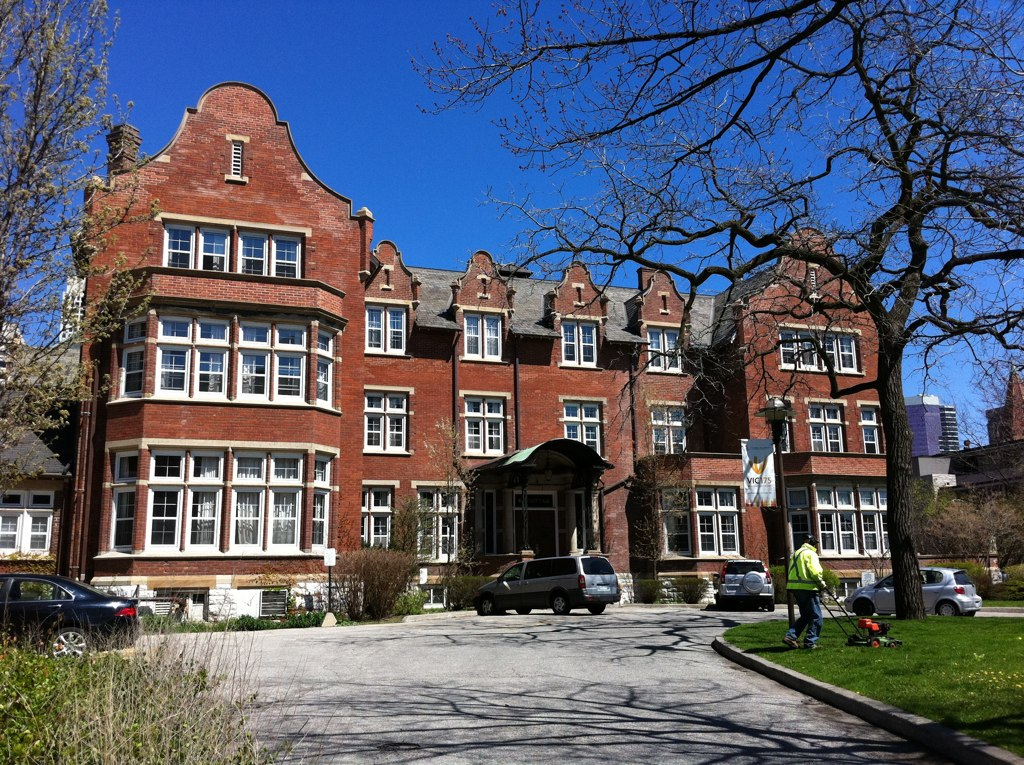

General information
- Type: Residence hall
- Architectural style: Queen Anne Revival
- Location: 95 Queen's Park Crescent; Toronto, Ontario, Canada
- Completed: 1903

Design and construction
- Architect: George Martel Miller

Other information
- Public transit: at Museum

National Historic Site of Canada
- Designated: November 16, 1990

Annesley Hall is the all-female residence of Victoria College at the University of Toronto. The residence is located on the St. George campus across from the Royal Ontario Museum and is designated a National Historic Site of Canada.

== History ==
Built in 1903 in the Queen Anne Revival style, Annesley Hall is the first university residence built for women in Canada. It was designed by architect George Martel Miller. Annesley Hall was home to the first female resident at the University, as well as the first woman to graduate from a Canadian medical school.

Annesley is noted for its close-knit community life and is also known for its elegance and uniqueness. No two rooms are the same, and students in Annesley are able to enjoy exclusive common space, such as the Tackaberry Library and the Music Room, found on the main floor.

Annesley Hall was a location used in the shoot of the 1974 horror movie Black Christmas. It was renovated and restored in 1988–1989.

== See also ==
- List of University of Toronto buildings
