= Elmsley =

Elmsley is a surname. Notable people with the surname include:

- Alex Elmsley (1929–2006), British Magician and Computer programmer
- James H. Elmsley (1895–1921), Canadian Major General, Commander of the Canadian Siberian Expeditionary Force
- John Elmsley, Chief Justice of Upper Canada (1796–1802) and Chief Justice of Lower Canada (1802–1805)
- Peter Elmsley (1773–1825), English classical scholar
- Peter Elmsley (bookseller) Elmsley or Elmsly (born 1736), bookseller from Aberdeenshire

== See also ==
- Drummond/North Elmsley, township in eastern Ontario, Canada in Lanark County
- Elmsley House, the official residence of the Lieutenant Governor of Upper Canada and Ontario, Canada
- South Elmsley Township, Ontario, township located within Leeds and Grenville United Counties in Eastern Ontario, Canada
- Helmsley
