= Victoria University, Toronto =

Federated university in the University of Toronto

Victoria University
- Coat of arms of Victoria University
- Former names: Upper Canada Academy (1836–1841); Victoria College (1841–1884)
- Motto: Abeunt studia in mores (Latin)
- Motto in English: "Studies pass into character"
- Named for: Queen Victoria
- Type: Federated university
- Established: October 12, 1836 (Upper Canada Academy); 1884 (Victoria University)
- Parent institution: University of Toronto
- Religious affiliation: Nonsectarian
- Academic affiliations: Universities Canada
- Endowment: C$572.3 million (2024)
- Chancellor: Steve Paikin
- President: William Robins (interim)
- Undergraduates: 3,475 (2021)
- Postgraduates: 173
- Location: 73 Queen's Park Crescent, Toronto, Ontario, Canada; 43°40′1″N 79°23′31″W
- Newspaper: The Strand
- Colours: Scarlet and gold
- Mascot: Lion
- Website: vicu.utoronto.ca

Victoria University (Vic U) is a federated university in the University of Toronto, located on its St. George campus in downtown Toronto, Ontario, Canada. The institution began as Upper Canada Academy, founded in 1836 in Cobourg by the Wesleyan Methodist Church of Canada as a nonsectarian literary institution. In 1841, it became an independent degree-granting institution known as Victoria College, which merged with Albert College in 1884 to form Victoria University. The university federated with the University of Toronto in 1890, relocating from Cobourg to Toronto.

The institution consists of two academic colleges:

- Victoria College (Vic), its secular Faculty of Arts, which serves as one of the seven undergraduate colleges in the University of Toronto Faculty of Arts and Science.
- Emmanuel College, the postgraduate theological college of Victoria University, affiliated with the United Church of Canada and the Toronto School of Theology.

Victoria is situated in the northeastern part of the St. George campus, adjacent to the University of St. Michael's College and Queen's Park. Among its residential halls is Annesley Hall, a National Historic Site of Canada. A major centre for Renaissance and Reformation studies, the university is home to international scholarly projects and holdings devoted to pre-Puritan English drama and the works of Desiderius Erasmus.

== History ==
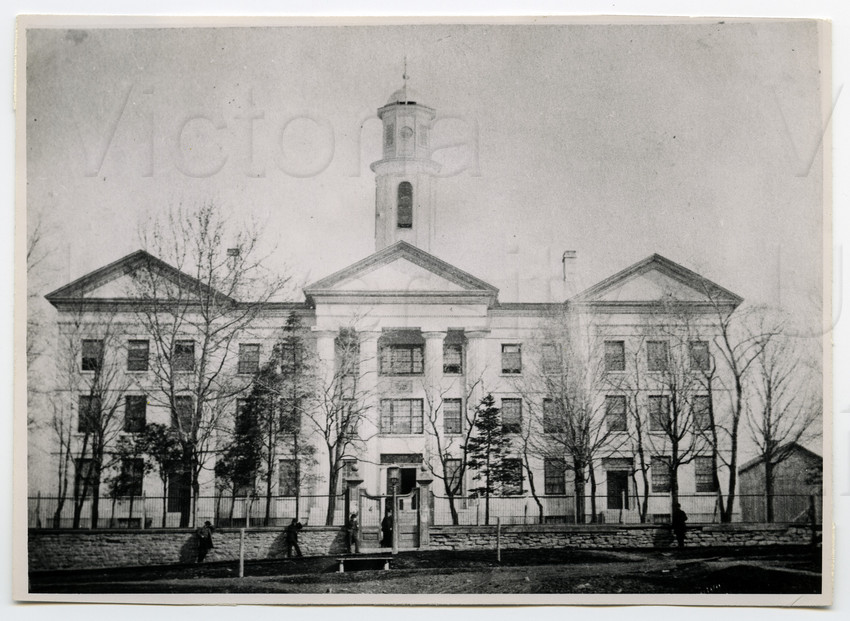
Upper Canada Academy in Cobourg, 1863 (Victoria University Archives)

Victoria College was founded as the Upper Canada Academy by the Wesleyan Methodist Church. In 1831, a church committee decided to locate the academy on four acres (1.6 hectares) of land in Cobourg, Ontario, east of Toronto, because of its central location in a large town and access by land and water. In 1836, Egerton Ryerson received a royal charter for the institution from King William IV in England, while the Upper Canadian government was hesitant to provide a charter to a Methodist institution. This was the first charter ever granted by the British Government to a Nonconformist body for an educational institution. The school officially opened to male and female students on October 12, 1836, with Matthew Richey as principal. Although the school taught a variety of liberal arts subjects, it also functioned as an unofficial Methodist seminary. In 1841, it was incorporated as Victoria College, named in honour of Queen Victoria, and finally received a charter from the Upper Canadian Legislature.

Victoria University formed in 1884 with the merger of Victoria College and Albert College in Belleville. In 1890, due to financial and geographic difficulties, the university federated with the University of Toronto. As a result of the merger, Victoria relinquished its degree-granting powers to the University of Toronto, except for in theology. In 1892, Victoria University moved from Cobourg to its current campus on Queen's Park Crescent, south of Bloor Street (at Charles Street West), in Toronto.

A plaque was erected at 100 University Avenue at the intersection with College Street in Cobourg, Ontario.

Victoria College The cornerstone of this building was laid June 7, 1832, and teaching began in 1836. First operated under a royal charter by the Wesleyan Methodists as Upper Canada Academy, in 1841 it obtained a provincial charter under the name of Victoria College, giving it power to grant degrees. Victoria's first president was the Reverend Egerton Ryerson, newspaper editor and founder of Ontario's present educational system. In 1890 the college federated with the University of Toronto and, in 1892, left Cobourg.

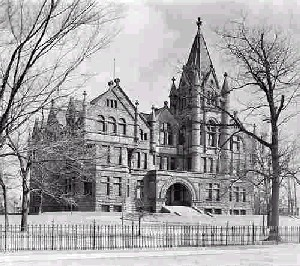
Old Vic in Toronto, 1900

James Loudon, a former president of the federated universities, had prohibited dancing at the University of Toronto until 1896. However, dancing at Victoria was not officially permissible until thirty years later, in 1926.

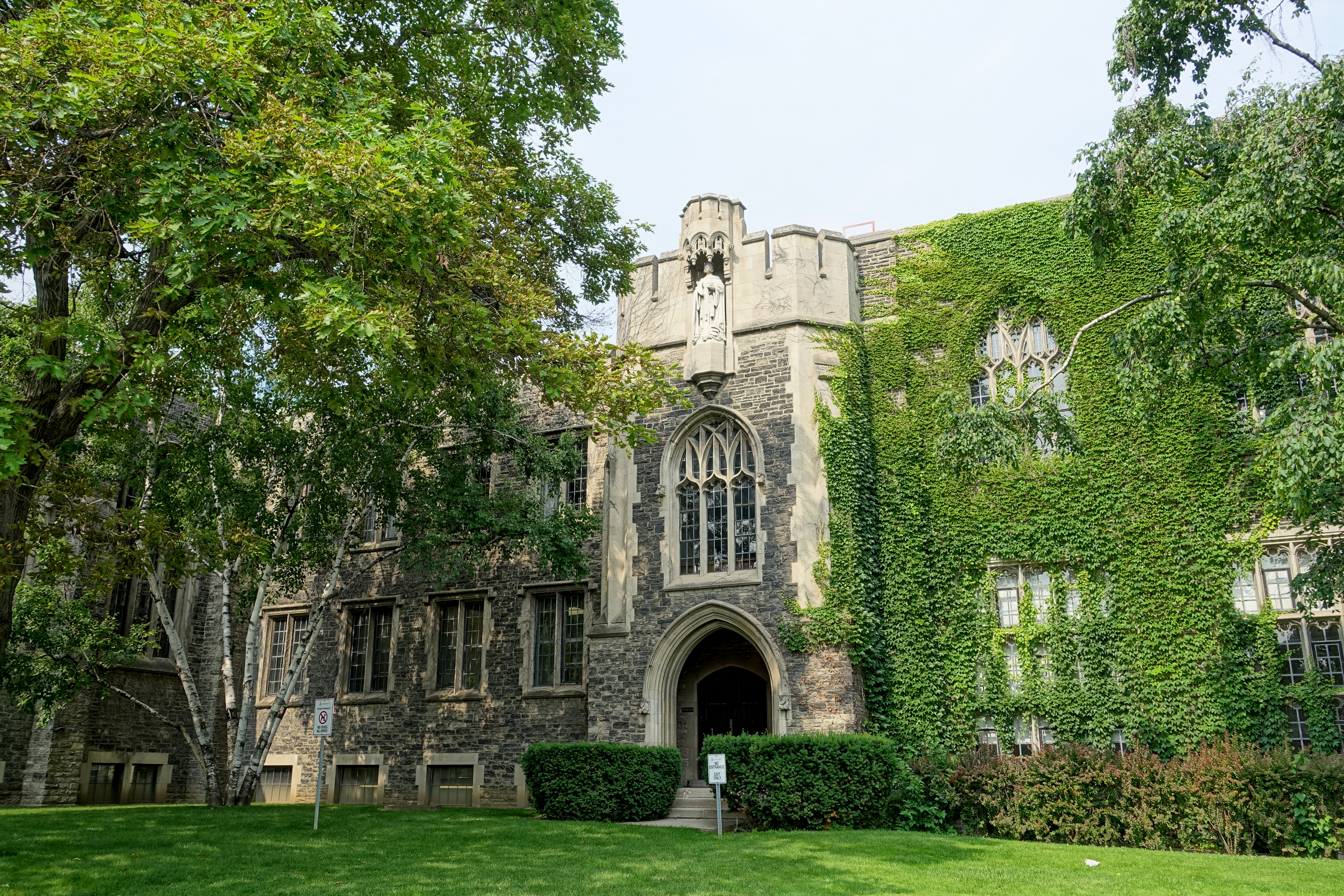
Emmanuel College, Victoria University

King George V gave Victoria College a silver cup used by Queen Victoria when she was a child and the Royal Standard that had flown at Osborne House and was draped on the coffin of the Queen when she died there in 1901.

Two bronze plaques on either side of the South door of Victoria College were erected as memorials dedicated to Victoria students who lost their lives in the First and Second World Wars. The WWI list of honour was erected by the Alumni and Alumnae Associations on October 13, 1923, while the WWII list of honour was erected by the Board of Regents.

In 1928, the independent Union College federated with the theology department of Victoria University and became Emmanuel College, the university's theological college.

"On the Old Ontario Strand" for piano by Joyce Belyea was published for the Victoria College Music Club between 1946 and 1948 by the J.H. Peel Music Pub. Co. in Toronto.

== Sites and architecture ==
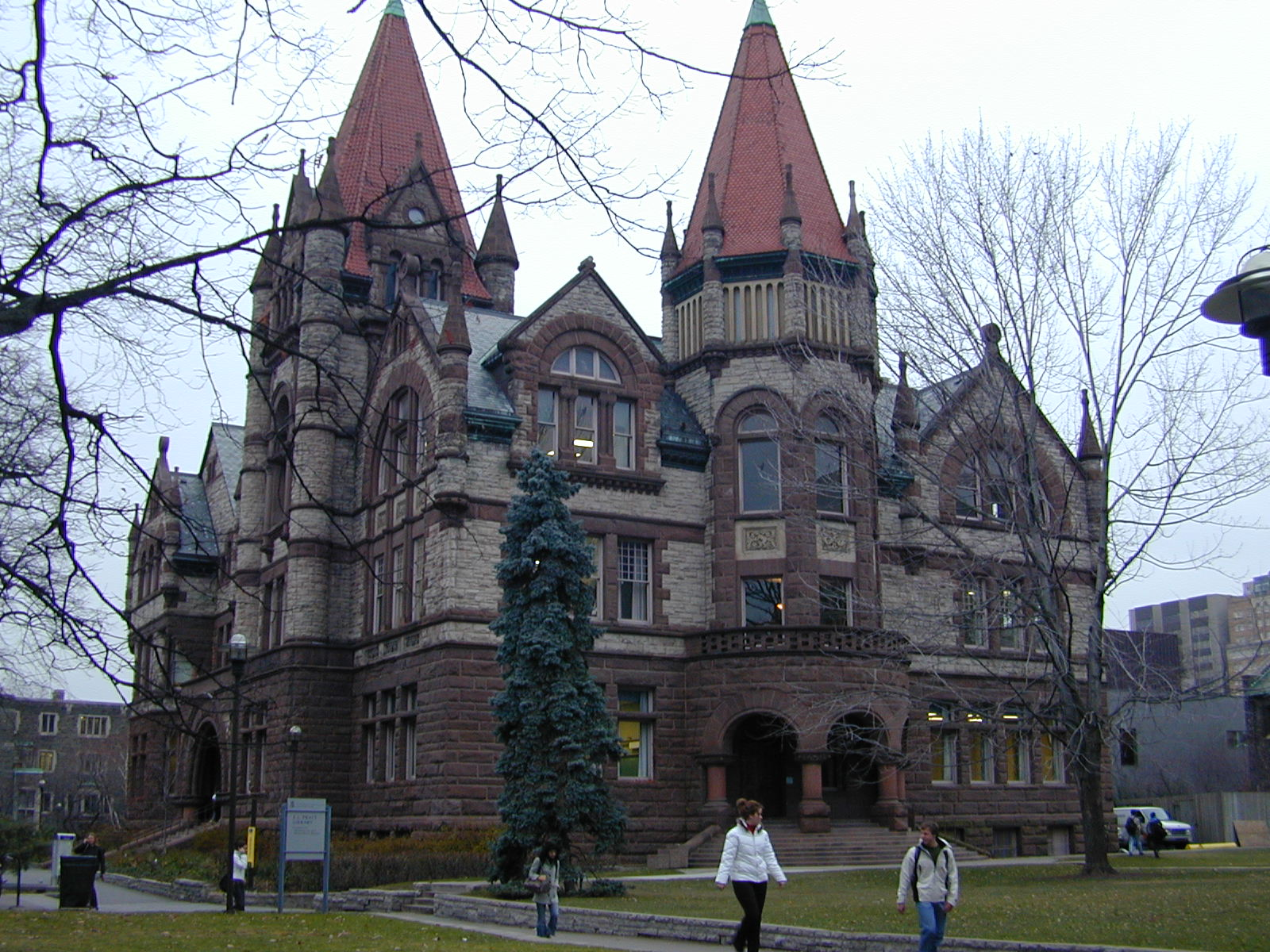
Old Vic, built in 1891

Victoria University borders Queen's Park, northeast of the University of Toronto's main St. George campus alongside the University of St. Michael's College. The Victoria College Building, colloquially called Old Vic, is an example of Richardsonian Romanesque architectural style, built in 1891. The architect was W. G. Storm, who died shortly after its completion. The campus is centred on the main quadrangle of Victoria, outlined by the Upper and Lower Houses of Burwash Hall.

West of the Lower Houses is the new Lester B. Pearson Garden of Peace and International Understanding and the E.J. Pratt Library beyond it. From the eastern side of the building, the Upper Houses look out at Rowell Jackman Hall and the Lower Houses see the St. Michael's College residence of Elmsley. The only exceptions are the view from Gate House's tower that looks down St. Mary's Street and the view from the south side of Bowles-Gandier house, which looks upon the main quadrangle of the University of St. Michael's College.

=== E.J. Pratt Library ===
E.J. Pratt Library is the main library of Victoria University. It was built in 1961 and is located at the south end of the quadrangle. The site of the library and the adjacent Northrop Frye Building was originally on the route of Queen's Park Crescent. The road was pushed south into Queen's Park to make way for the new buildings.

=== Residences ===
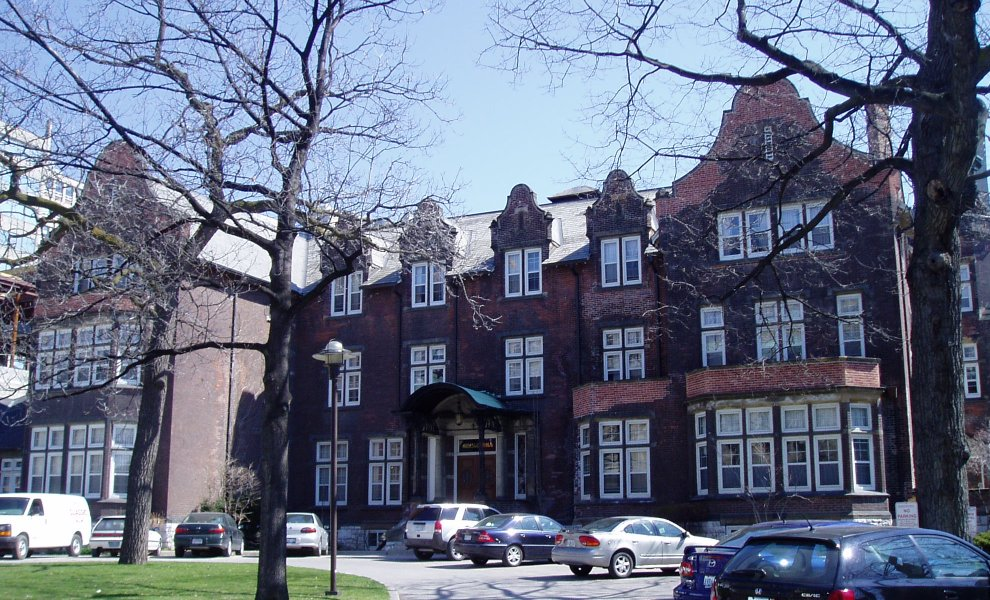
Annesley Hall

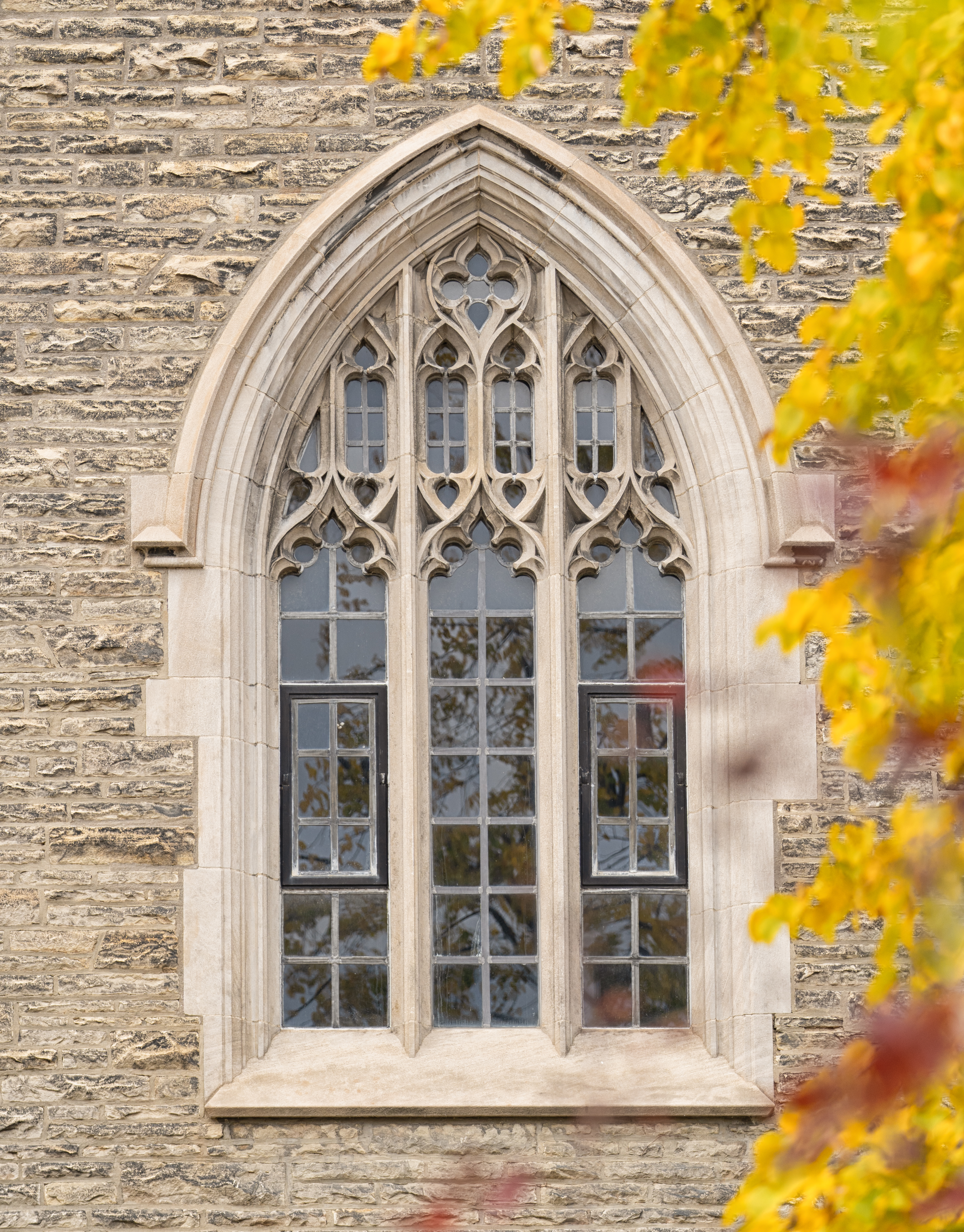
Window of Emmanuel College

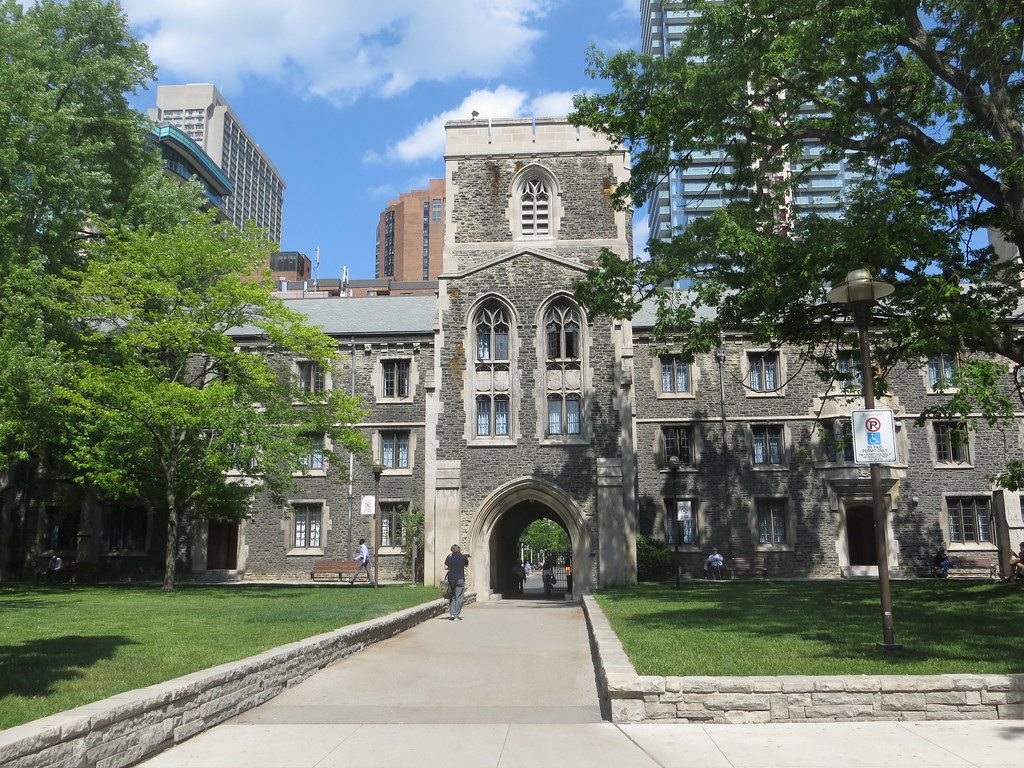
Burwash Hall

Victoria University is well-known for its historic residence buildings and tight-knit residence community.

- Annesley Hall is the oldest residence building at Victoria University, built in 1903 and renovated in 1988. It is a National Historic Site of Canada located across from the Royal Ontario Museum. Annesley Hall remains an all-female residence – the first university residence built specifically for women in Canada.
- Burwash Hall was constructed in 1913, originally known as "the men's residences". It was named after Nathanael Burwash, a former president of Victoria. The building is an extravagant Neo-Gothic work with turrets, gargoyles, and battlements. The building is divided between the large dining hall in the northwest and the student residence proper. The residence area is divided into two sections. The Upper Houses, built in 1913, consist of: North House, Middle House, Gate House, and South House. The Lower Houses were built in 1931 and were originally intended to house theology students at Emmanuel College, whose main building was opened the same year. First House, Nelles House, Caven House, Bowles-Gandier House are now mostly home to undergraduate Arts and Science students. Before the 1995 renovations, the entire building was male, but co-ed living was slowly introduced with Gate House being the last to convert in 2007.
- Margaret Addison Hall was built in 1959 as an extension of women's residence rooms. It converted to co-ed in the 1990s and features seven floors with communal washrooms.
- Rowell Jackman Hall is the newest of the residence buildings, constructed in 1993. It features an apartment-style residence with each room divided into four suites with a common area. Rowell Jackman Hall is named after Mary Rowell Jackman, whose son Hal Jackman made a substantial donation to the project. It stands just east of Burwash Hall on Charles St. and is west of the University of St. Michael's College's Loretto College. Before Rowell Jackman Hall was built, the site was home to a parking lot and the historic Stephenson House.
- Stephenson House was a community involvement residence at Victoria University from 1939–2010, but has since become defunct. The House hosted ten undergraduate students per year, self-governed and self-regulating with a separate application and selection process. It last functioned as a residence in the 2009–2010 academic year.

== Organization ==
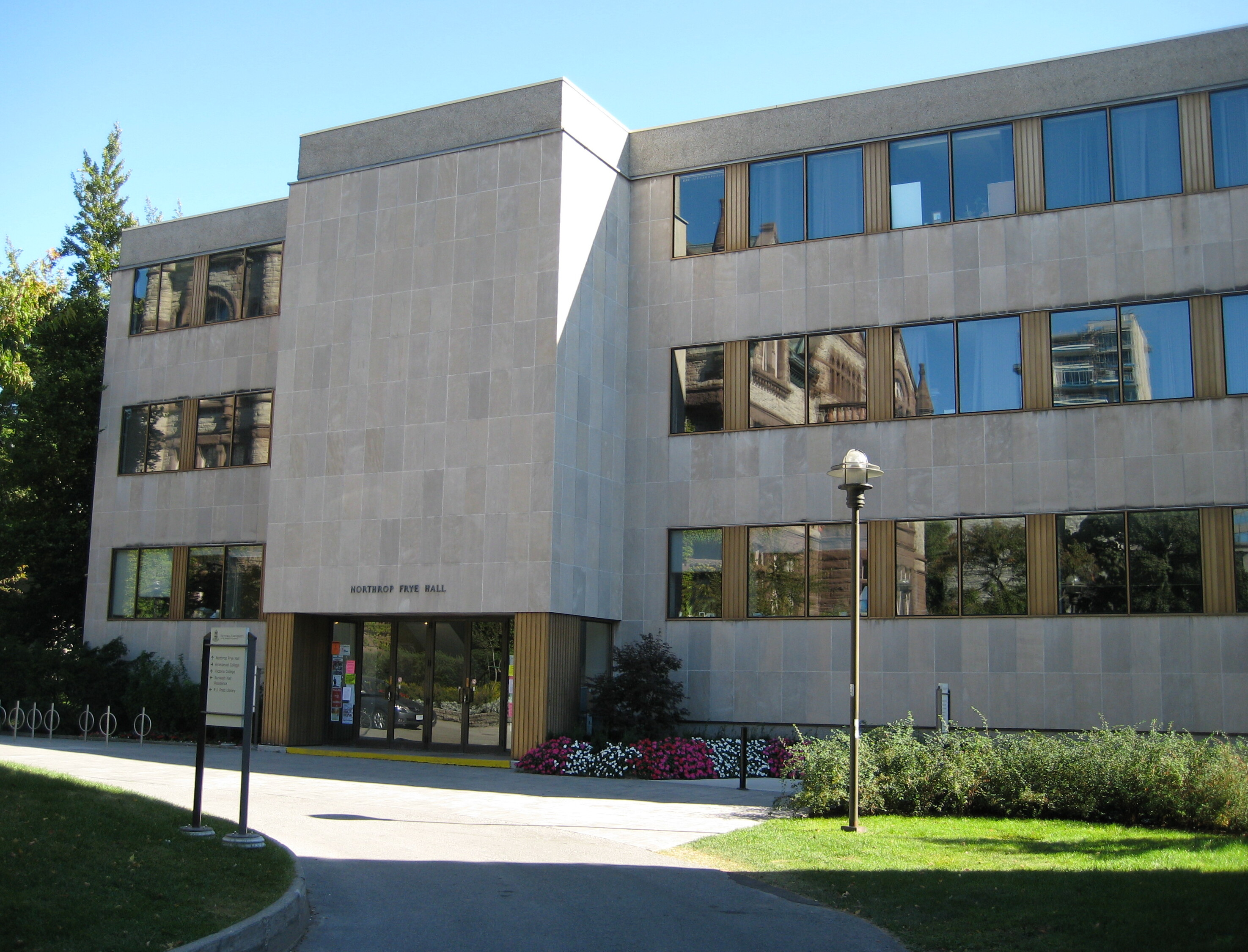
Northrop Frye Hall

As a federated university, Victoria University is a separate legal entity from the University of Toronto governed by an independent board, and possesses significant autonomy over its finances and appointment of staff. It is governed bicamerally by the Victoria University Board of Regents and the Victoria University Senate. These bodies are represented by faculty, administrators, elected students and alumni. The colleges are governed by the Victoria College Council and Emmanuel College Council. College councils are represented by faculty, administrators and elected and appointed students. Victoria's governing charter was most recently amended in 1981, with the enactment of the Victoria University Act.

Victoria is presently the wealthiest federated university or college at the University of Toronto by net assets. In part this has been because of alumni donations, but much of the growth is specifically due to the rapidly increasing value of Victoria University's large real estate holdings in downtown Toronto.

The E.J. Pratt Library is the main library in the Victoria University Library system, which operates under the wider University of Toronto Libraries system. The collection of approximately 250,000 volumes is geared towards the undergraduate programs at Vic and contains mainly humanities texts with a focus on History, English, Philosophy. The library also hosts rich archival special collections from notable alumni and faculty, historical figures, specific literary collections and Canadiana. The library also oversees Victoria University's institutional archives.

The Centre for Renaissance and Reformation Studies and its respective library collection are located within the E.J. Pratt Library. Its holdings fall into three main categories: rare books, most of which were printed before 1700 (currently about 4,000 titles), modern books and microforms (several thousand microfiches and reels). The library contains primary and secondary materials relating to virtually every aspect of the Renaissance and Reformation. In particular, it houses the Erasmus collection, one of the richest resources in North America for the study of works written or edited by the great Dutch humanist Desiderius Erasmus of Rotterdam. The collection holds a substantial number of pre-1700 editions of his works, including the Novum Instrumentum of 1516.

Emmanuel College Library is the theological library of the Victoria University Library system, also operating under the wider University of Toronto Libraries system. The library is noted for its beauty and is a frequented spot by theological and undergraduate students alike, hosting a sizable theological collection specializing in spiritual care, worship, homiletics, biblical studies, and the Methodist tradition, among others. Special collections and rare books in Emmanuel's collection are held and can be viewed at E.J. Pratt Library.

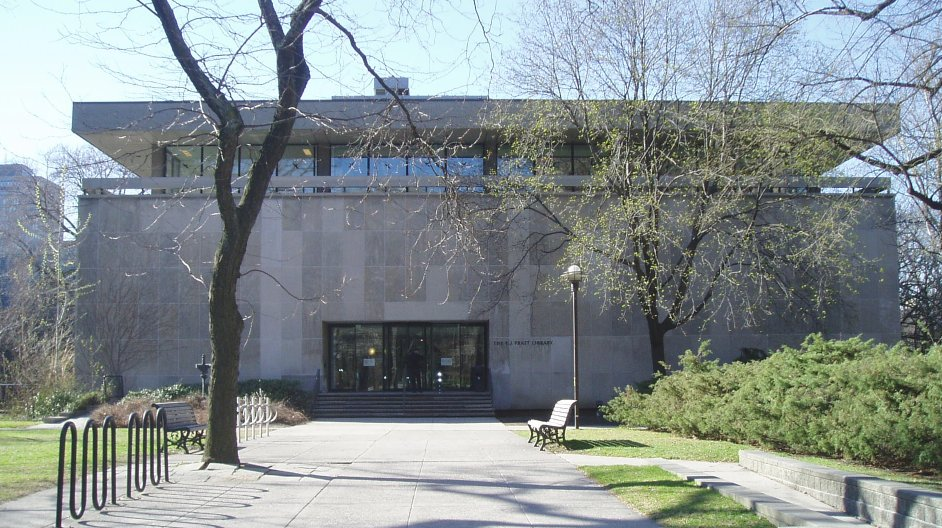
The E.J. Pratt Library

== Student life ==
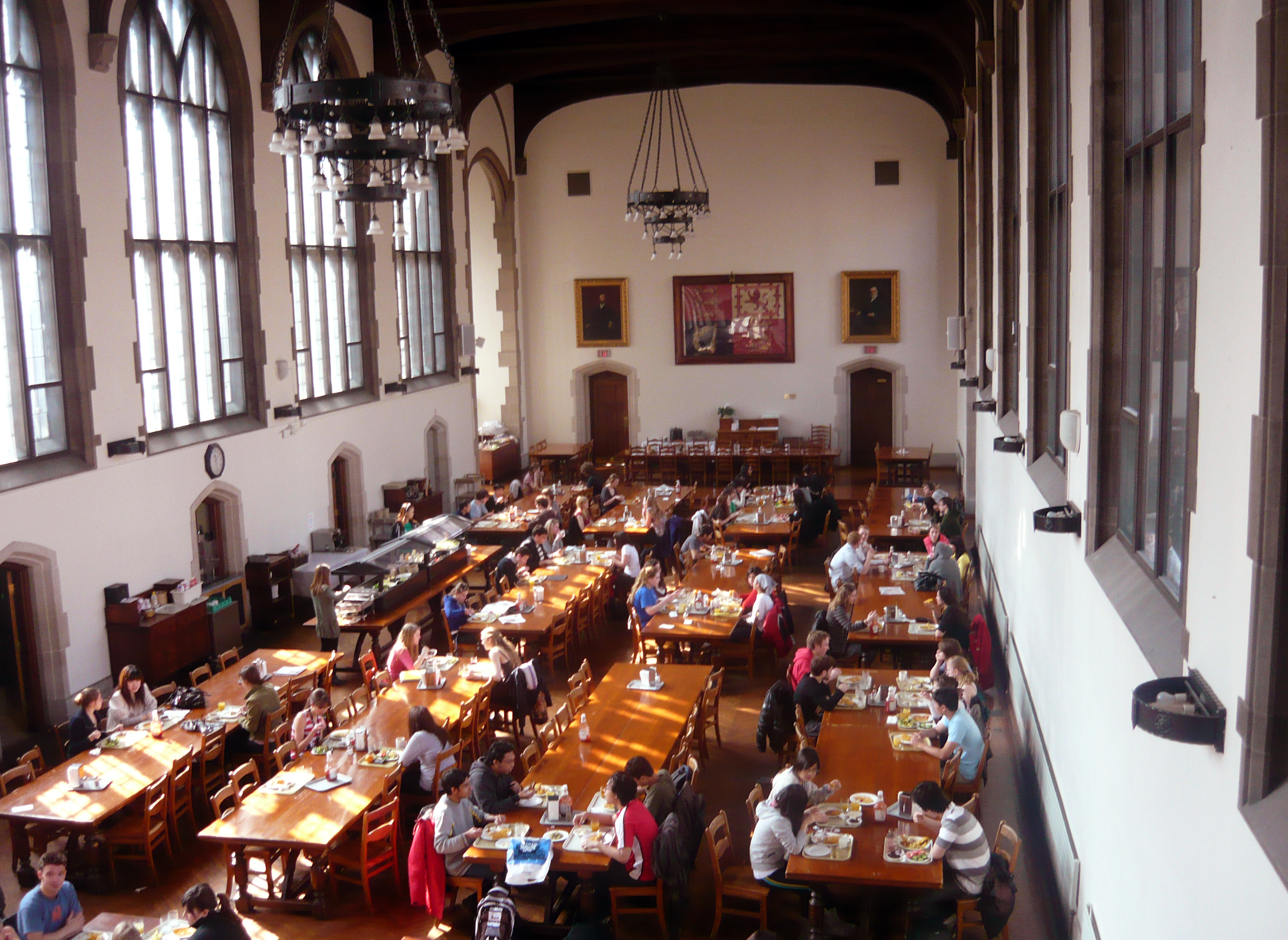
Inside Burwash Dining Hall

=== Clubs and Levies ===
Campus life for Victoria students is active and varied. Victoria College has levy receivers, student organizations that directly receive a fixed amount of funding from students every year, as well as clubs whose funding are overseen by the Victoria University Students' Administrative Council (VUSAC). Prominent clubs include The Boundary (the college's satire paper), the Environmental Fashion Show, Vic Dance and the Victoria College Chorus.

Levy receivers are students groups with special status based on providing an essential service for student life, and levy heads are also assessor members in VUSAC. Victoria's eleven levy receivers are:

- Acta Victoriana, Victoria University's literary journal
- Victoria College Drama Society (VCDS), which runs at least four shows per year (a fall show, a winter show, a submission to the University of Toronto Drama Festival, and a musical)
- The Strand, Vic's student-run newspaper that is distributed fortnightly across the University of Toronto's St. George campus
- Victoria College Athletics Association (VCAA), which provides students with a chance to participate and compete in intramural sports
- The Cat's Eye, a student lounge in the Goldring Student Centre building that is often used to hold events
- WUSC, which sponsors a student from a developing country to come to the University of Toronto
- Caffiends, Vic's student-run fair trade organic cafe
- VicPride!, an LGBTQ organization that strives to create a safe space at Victoria
- Student Projects, a fund available to students to finance projects that enrich student life
- VicXposure, a photography group offering workshops, equipment rentals and darkroom use
- VISA, the Victoria International Students Association

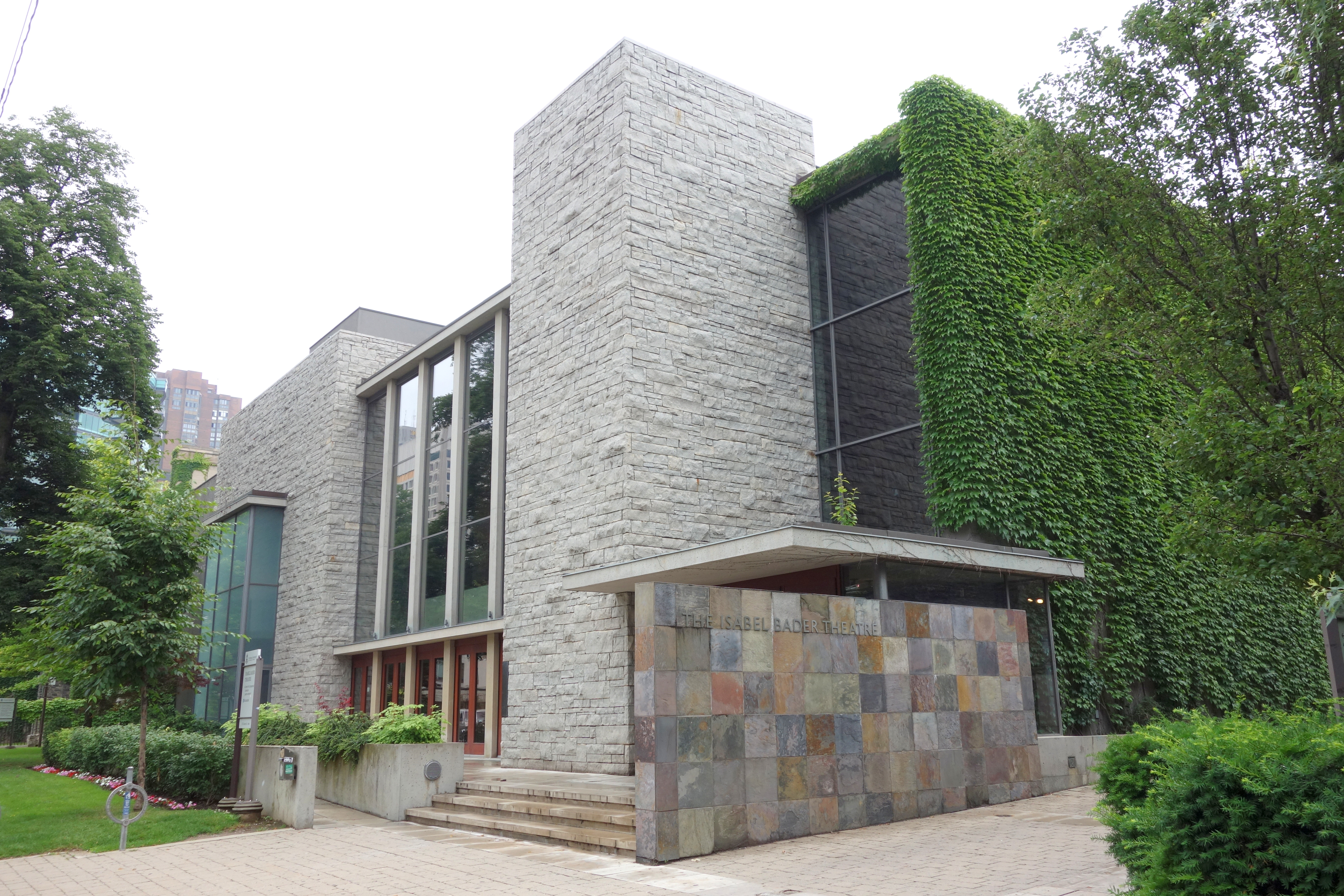
Isabel Bader Theatre

Victoria is also home to the Isabel Bader Theatre, opened in March 2001. During the past few years the theatre has been used as a lecture hall for University of Toronto students, an active learning space for Victoria University students groups, numerous concerts, film screenings, conferences, and theatrical productions, including the annual sophomore tradition launched in 1872, The Bob Comedy Revue, each written, directed, produced and performed by students such as Lester B. Pearson, Norman Jewison, E. J. Pratt, Northrop Frye, and Margaret Atwood.

== Academics ==
The undergraduate academic programs of Victoria College (the secular Faculty of Arts) include Literary Studies, Semiotics and Communication Theory, Renaissance Studies, and the Vic Concurrent Teacher Education Program (developed in conjunction with the Ontario Institute for Studies in Education). Other academic offerings of note include the first-year undergraduate programs Vic One and Vic First Pathways.

The Vic One program, launched in 2003, is an academic opportunity for first-year students in the University of Toronto's Faculty of Arts and Science to build communication and leadership skills in a small classroom setting. Applications typically open in December for any student who is applying to the university for enrolment in the following September. The Vic One program supplements a student's primary program of study in the form of weekly small group seminars and guest lectures from professors, visiting artists, writers, ambassadors and other public figures. Enrolment in each academic stream is limited to 25 students, with a maximum of 250 students in the program each year. The eight streams are:

1. Chambers (Commerce, Economics, & Policy) – Named for Margaret Chambers (Vic 3T8), founding member of The Co-operators.
2. Education (Education & Society) – Originally named Ryerson, for the first principal of Victoria College, Egerton Ryerson. The name of the program was changed in September 2019 due to Ryerson's involvement with the residential school system in Canada.
3. Frye (Literature & the Humanities) – Named for Victoria University principal, chancellor and student, Northrop Frye (Vic 3T3), a Canadian literary critic and theorist.
4. Gooch (Philosophy & Ethical Citizenship) – Named for Victoria University president, Paul W. Gooch, a Canadian philosopher and founding member of the Vic One program.
5. Jewison (Creative Arts & Society) – Named for Norman Jewison (Vic 4T9), a Canadian film director and producer.
6. Pearson (History, Politics & Social Sciences) – Named for Lester B. Pearson (Vic 1T9), former Prime Minister of Canada.
7. Schawlow (Physical & Mathematical Sciences) – Named for Arthur Leonard Schawlow (Vic 4T1), American physicist and Nobel Prize winner.
8. Stowe-Gullen (Life Sciences) – Named for Augusta Stowe-Gullen (Vic 1883), the first woman to graduate from a Canadian medical school.

The Centre for Renaissance and Reformation Studies (CRRS) is a research and teaching centre in Victoria University devoted to the study of the period from approximately 1350 to 1700. The CRRS supervises an undergraduate program in Renaissance Studies, organizes lectures and seminars, and maintains an active series of publications. The centre also offers undergraduate, graduate, and postdoctoral fellowships. From 1976 to 2009, the performance history research and publishing project Records of Early English Drama (REED) was based at Victoria University.

Through Emmanuel College, Victoria University also offers theological postgraduate options in the ecumenical tradition of the United Church of Canada, which are developed in close conjunction with the wider Toronto School of Theology. The most popular offering at Emmanuel is the Master of Divinity, which is undertaken by prospective ordinands to ministry of Word and Sacrament. Other offerings at Emmanuel include master's degrees in pastoral studies, sacred music, general theological studies, and more. Doctoral study in theological studies is also offered.

== Board of regents ==
The board of regents is the governing body of Victoria University. The board appoints the chancellor, the president, the college principals, the officers of the university, and appoints and promotes the teaching staff of Victoria and Emmanuel colleges.

The 37 members of the board of regents include students (6), faculty (8), Victoria College alumni (1), Emmanuel College alumni (2), United Church appointees (13), ex-officio (4) and discretionary (3).

Term	Chair
1884–1914	Albert Carman (Vic 1855)
1914–1928	Samuel Dwight Chown (Vic 1877)
1928–1933	Newton Wesley Rowell
1933–1934	Alfred Ernest Ames
1934–1942	James Russell Lovett Starr (Vic 1887)
1942–1951	Wilfrid Crossen James (Vic 1T6)
1951–1958	Leopold Macaulay (Vic 1T1)
1958–1962	Henry Eden Langford (Vic 2T8)
1962–1971	Ralph Shaw Mills (Vic 2T5)
1971–1974	Frederick Arthur Wansbrough (Vic 2T8)
1974–1978	Donald Walker McGibbon (Vic 3T2)
1978–1982	G. Dennis Lane (Vic 5T5)
1982–1985	Henry Jonathon Sissons (Vic 3T7)
1985–1989	David Walter Pretty (Vic 4T7)
1989–1992	Ruth Marion (Manning) Alexander (Vic 5T0)
1992–1995	Paul Wesley Fox (Vic 4T4)
1995–1998	Richard P.K. Cousland (Vic 5T4)
1998–2001	Elizabeth (Eastlake) Vosburgh (Vic 6T8)
2001–2004	David E. Clark (Vic 7T1)
2004–2007	Frank Mills (Vic 6T8)
2007–2010	Murray Corlett (Vic 6T1)
2010–2014	Paul Huyer (Vic 8T1)
2014–2018	John Field (Vic 7T8)
2018–2021	Lisa Khoo (Vic 8T9)
2021–2024	Cynthia Crysler (Vic 9T0)
2024–	W. Keith Thomas

== Administrators ==
	Principal (Victoria College)	President	Chancellor
Upper Canada Academy (1836–1841)	Matthew Richey (1836–1840)		
Upper Canada Academy (1836–1841)	Jesse B. Hurlburt (1840–1841)		
Victoria College (1841–1884)	Egerton Ryerson (1841–1847)		
Victoria College (1841–1884)	Alexander MacNab (1847–1849)	Matthew Richey (1849–1850)	
Victoria College (1841–1884)	John Wilson (1849–1850)	Egerton Ryerson (1850–1854)	
Victoria College (1841–1884)	Samuel S. Nelles (1850–1884)	Samuel S. Nelles (1854–1884)	
Victoria University (1884–)		Samuel S. Nelles (1884–1887)	
Victoria University (1884–)		Nathaneal Burwash (1887–1912)	
Victoria University (1884–)		Richard Pinch Bowles (1913–1930)	
Victoria University (1884–)	Edward Wilson Wallace (1930–1932)		
Victoria University (1884–)	Walter Theodore Brown (1932–1941)	Edward Wilson Wallace (1932–1941)	
Victoria University (1884–)	Harold Bennett (1941–1959)	Walter Theodore Brown (1941–1944)	
Victoria University (1884–)	H. Northrop Frye (1959–1966)	Walter Theodore Brown (1944–1949)	Alexander Charles Spencer (1944–1951)
Victoria University (1884–)	John Edwin Hodgetts (1967–1970)	Harold Bennett (1949–1950)	Lester Bowles Pearson (1952–1959)
Victoria University (1884–)	John Mercel Robson (1971–1976)	Arthur Bruce Barbour Moore (1950–1970)	Louis Orville Breithaupt (1959–1960)
Victoria University (1884–)	Gordon Lincoln Keyes (1976–1981)	John Edwin Hodgetts (1970–1972)	H. Northrop Frye (1978–1991)
Victoria University (1884–)	Alexandra Ferguson Johnston (1981–1991)	Goldwin S. French (1973–1987)	Sang-Chul Lee (1992–1998)
Victoria University (1884–)	William J. Callahan (1991–2000)	Eva Milada Kushner (1987–1994)	Kenneth D. Taylor (1998–2004)
Victoria University (1884–)	David B. Cook (2000–2012)	Roseann Runte (1994–2001)	Norman Frederick Jewison (2004–2010)
Victoria University (1884–)	Angela Esterhammer (2012–2024)	Paul W. Gooch (2001–2015)	Wendy Marion Cecil (2010–2017)
Victoria University (1884–)	Alex Eric Hernandez (2024–)	William R. Robins (2015–2022)	Carole (Goss) Taylor (2017–2020)
Victoria University (1884–)		Rhonda N. McEwen (2022–2026)	Nick Saul (2020–2026)
Victoria University (1884–)		William R. Robins (interim, 2026-)	Steve Paikin (2026–)

== Notable alumni and faculty ==
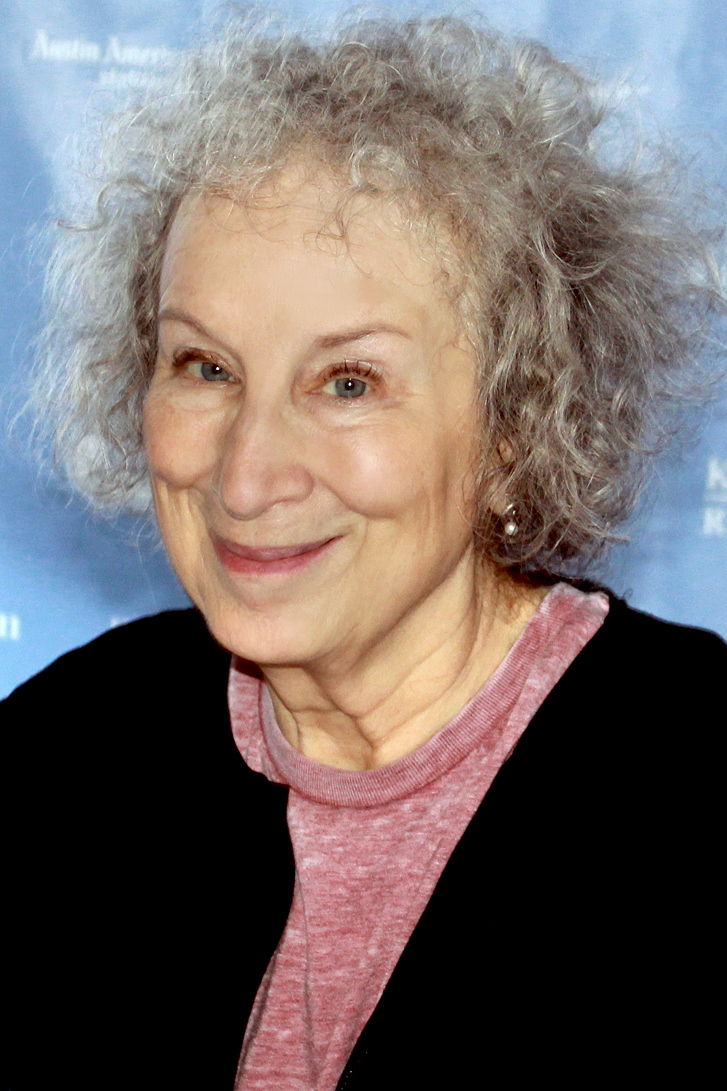
Margaret Atwood

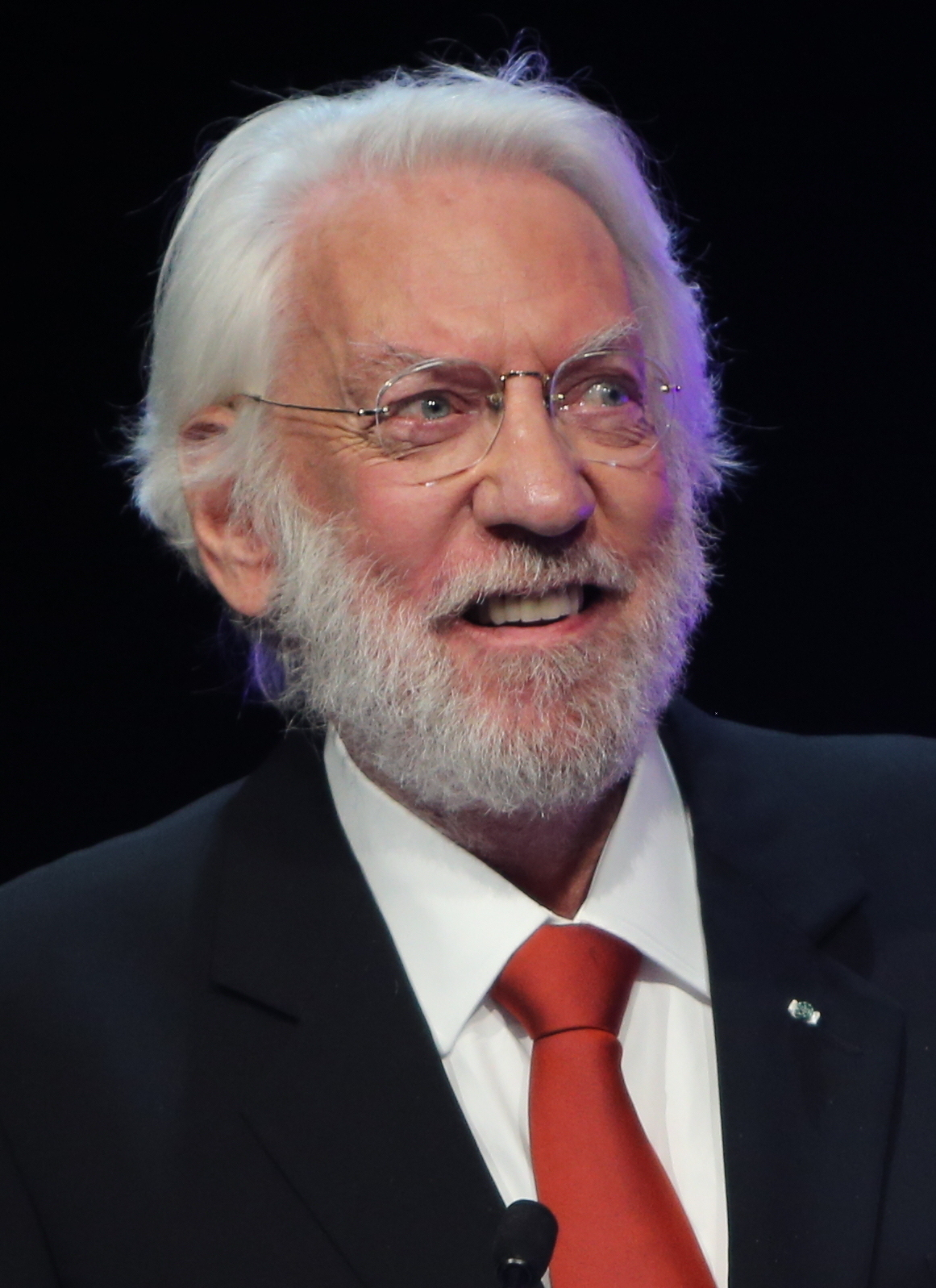
Donald Sutherland

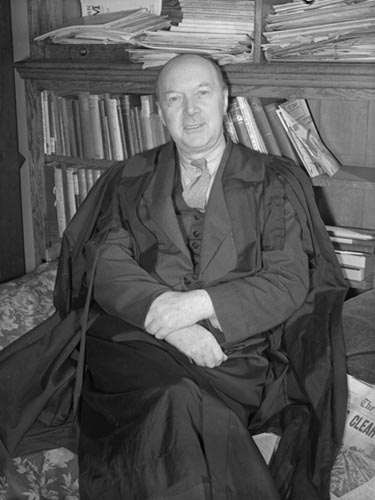
E. J. Pratt

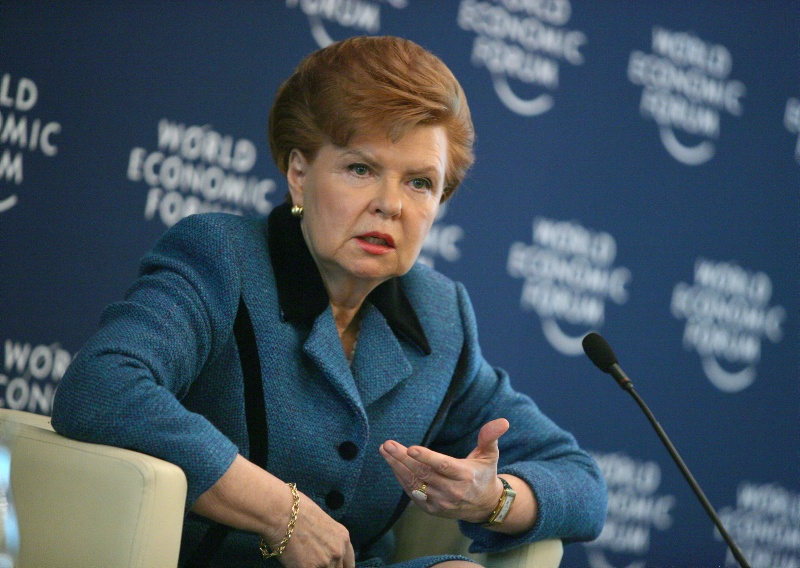
Vaira Vīķe-Freiberga

- Nellie Greenwood Andrews – suffragist, first female graduate of Victoria College (1884)
- Margaret Atwood – author
- Margaret Avison – poet
- Frederick Banting – attended; Nobel Prize in Physiology or Medicine, 1923
- George Blewett – philosopher and theologian
- Ben Chin – political advisor and journalist
- John Clay Coleman – Methodist minister and black rights activist
- John Royston Coleman – economist, president of Haverford College, host of CBS program Money Talks
- William Black Creighton – social reformer
- Wilbur R. Franks – noted scientist and cancer researcher
- Northrop Frye – literary critic
- Jessa Gamble – author and science journalist
- Peter Godsoe – president and CEO of Bank of Nova Scotia, 1992–2003; chairman of Fairmont Hotels and Resorts and Sobeys, chancellor of the University of Western Ontario, 1996–2000
- Blake Goldring – executive chairman of AGF Management Limited
- W. G. Hardy – professor, writer, president of the International Ice Hockey Federation, Member of Order of Canada
- Don Harron – comedian
- Lawrence Ho – billionaire businessman, chairman & CEO, Melco International
- Henry Horricks – pacifist and anti-racism activist
- Norman Jewison – former chancellor of Victoria University and Academy Award-winning (Irving G. Thalberg Memorial Award) filmmaker
- Ted Jolliffe – Rhodes scholar and first leader of the Ontario section of the Co-operative Commonwealth Federation (CCF)
- Andromache Karakatsanis – Canadian Supreme Court justice – first Greek-Canadian judge on the court
- Paul Kneale – artist
- Jay Macpherson – poet
- Don McKellar – actor and filmmaker
- John Fletcher McLaughlin – prominent theologian
- Philip Orsino – president and CEO of Masonite International Corporation, 1989–2005
- Richard Outram – poet
- Steve Paikin – journalist
- Lester B. Pearson – former Prime Minister of Canada and Nobel Laureate
- E. J. Pratt – poet
- Laure Rièse – first female faculty member
- Egerton Ryerson – one of the founders of Victoria College and its first president
- Nick Saul – Canadian food and social justice activist, author
- Arthur L. Schawlow – physicist, Nobel laureate
- Arthur Sifton – second premier of Alberta
- Sir Clifford Sifton – minister of the interior under Wilfrid Laurier
- J. Lavell Smith – anti-war activist
- Augusta Stowe-Gullen – first woman to graduate from a Canadian medical school
- Donald Sutherland – Academy Honorary Award-winning actor
- Carole Taylor – former minister of finance of British Columbia, former chancellor of Simon Fraser University
- Kenneth D. Taylor – former chancellor of Victoria University and former Canadian ambassador to Iran
- Vaira Vīķe-Freiberga – 6th president of Latvia
- Ian Williams – writer, 2019 Giller Prize winner
- Bob Young – entrepreneur, co-founder of Red Hat

== See also ==
- Royal eponyms in Canada
