= Richard Pinch Bowles =

The Reverend Richard Pinch Bowles
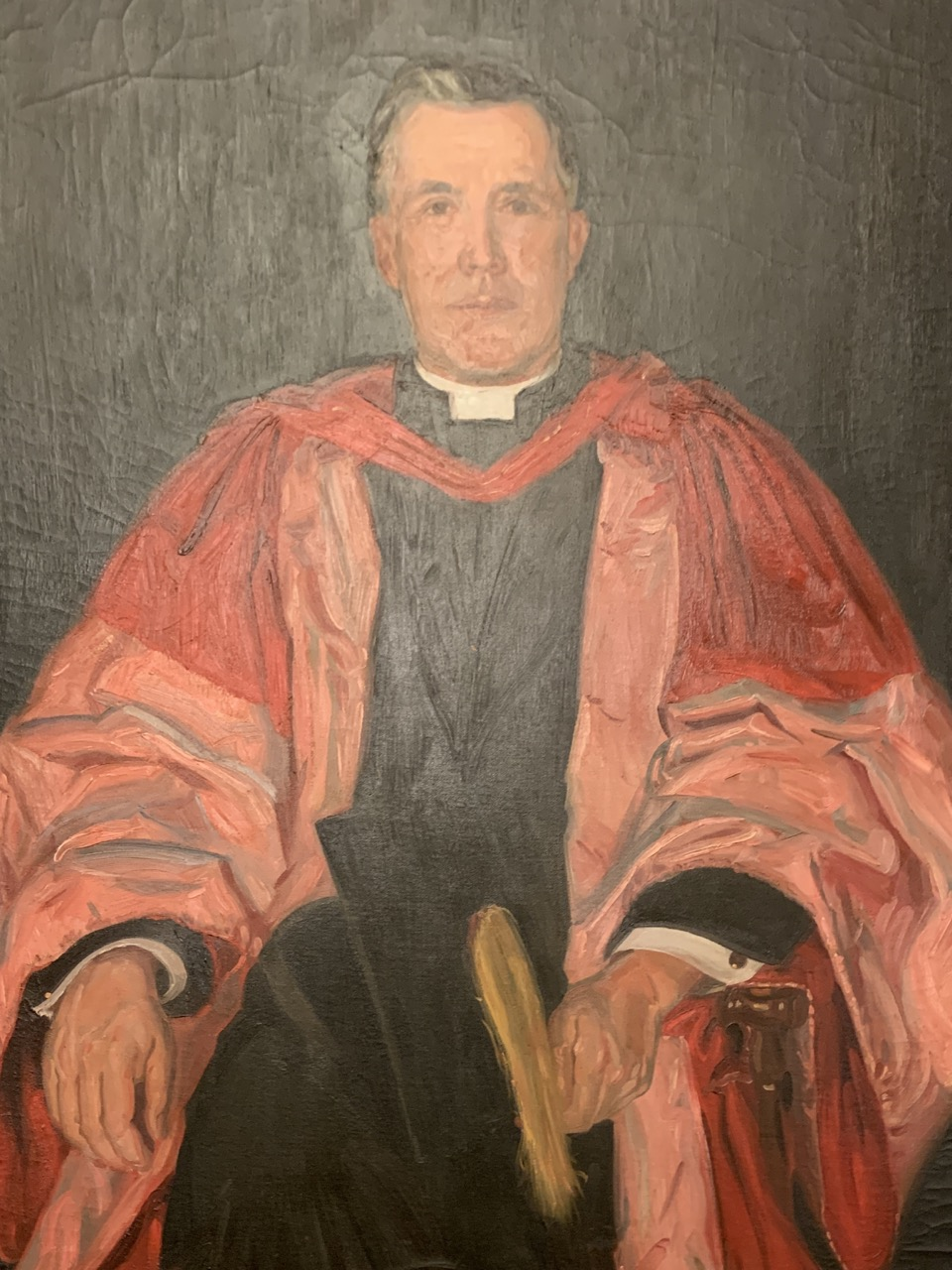
- Born: August 17, 1864; Peel County, Ontario, Canada
- Died: 16 June 1960 (aged 95); Ontario, Canada
- Education: B.A., Victoria University, 1885; M.A., Victoria University, D. D., Victoria University

Richard Pinch Bowles (17 August 1864 – 16 June 1960) was a Canadian Methodist minister and university administrator in Ontario, Canada.

Son of George Bowles and Elizabeth Unett (Pinch) Bowles, he was Reverend of Grace Church, Winnipeg and of Sherbourne Street Methodist Church in Toronto, before becoming Professor of Homiletics (1905–1913) at Victoria University in the University of Toronto. Bowles later held the position of President and Chancellor at Victoria University (1913–1930).
