= Samuel Sobieski Nelles =

Canadian academic administrator (1823–1887)

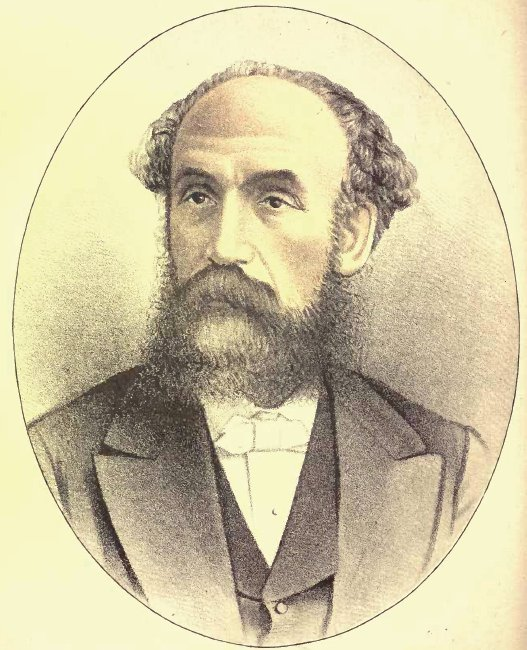
- Born: October 17, 1823; Mount Pleasant, Upper Canada
- Died: October 17, 1887 (aged 64); Cobourg, Ontario, Canada
- Occupations: Methodist minister and educator

Samuel Sobieski Nelles (October 17, 1823 – October 17, 1887) was a Canadian Methodist minister and academic.

Born in Mount Pleasant in what was then Upper Canada, Nelles was the eldest son of William Nelles and Mary Hardy who had immigrated to Canada from New York state after the War of 1812. Nelles was educated in local schools, the Lewiston Academy, the Frederica Academy, and the Genesee Wesleyan Seminary. He attended Victoria College in Cobourg from 1842 to 1844 and graduated from Wesleyan University in 1846, and there became a member of the Mystical Seven. He spent a year as a principal of the Newburgh Academy in Lennox County before being ordained a minister of the Wesleyan Methodist Church in Canada in 1850.

In 1850, he was appointed professor of classics and acting principal of Victoria College. In 1851, he was appointed principal and succeeded Egerton Ryerson in 1854 to become president. In 1884, the school was renamed Victoria University and he would become its first chancellor and president serving until his death in 1887.
