= Derryvore =

Village in United Kingdom

Derryvore (from Irish Doire Mhór, meaning 'great oak-wood') is the name of three townlands in Northern Ireland.

== Derryvore, Kinawley ==
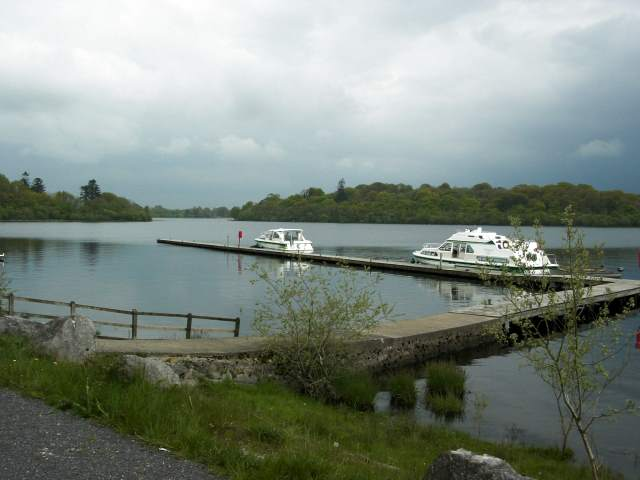
Derryvore Quay - Upper Loch Erne

This Derryvore is located in the civil parish of Kinawley in County Fermanagh. It lies on a small peninsula in Upper Lough Erne. Its landscape includes many fens and reedbeds in Erne valley. The area first was a part of the Crom Estate, which according to a map survey done in 1719 and 1721 included the townlands of Derrybeg West, Corraharra, and Derryvore. In 1629, King James I of Ireland granted Derryvore, as part of a parcel of other settlements that had been confiscated off of Irish lords during the flight of the Earls, to Thomas Moneypenny. Moneypenny then transferred the lands to his armiger Thomas Creighton. Derryvore in 1765 mostly came into the ownership of the Green family after it had been split between them and the nobility of Erne. In 1829, the land was purchased by Abraham Creighton, 2nd Earl Erne, reuniting his ancestors traditional lands. In 1860, a chain ferry with two stone piers was constructed in Derryvore to connect it with Inisherk Island. The designs originated from Dundalk.

Derryvore includes a Trinity Church (known locally as Crom Church), commissioned by John Crichton, 3rd Earl Erne, despite disagreements with the Church of Ireland's Bishop of Clogher. It was built in 1842 and expanded to include towers in the 1880s.

== Derryvore, Enniskillen ==
This Derryvore is located in the civil parish of Enniskillen in County Fermanagh.

== Derryvore, Seagoe ==
This Derryvore is located in the civil parish of Seagoe in County Armagh.
