= Earl Erne =

Title in the peerage of Ireland

- Arms: Argent, a Lion rampant Azure. Crest: A Dragon's Head couped Vert, emitting fire from the mouth and ears proper. Supporters: On either side a Lion Azure, crowned with an Earl's Coronet proper.
- Creation date: 19 August 1789
- Created by: George III
- Peerage: Peerage of Ireland
- First holder: John Creighton, 2nd Baron Erne
- Present holder: John Crichton, 7th Earl Erne
- Heir presumptive: Charles Crichton
- Remainder to: The 1st Earl's heirs male of the body lawfully begotten
- Subsidiary titles: Viscount Erne; Baron Erne; Baron Fermanagh
- Status: Extant
- Seat: Crom Castle
- Motto: GOD SEND GRACE

Earl Erne, of Crom Castle in the County of Fermanagh, is a title in the Peerage of Ireland. It was created in August 1789 for John Creighton, 1st Viscount Erne, who had earlier represented Lifford in the Irish House of Commons. He had succeeded his father as the 2nd Baron Erne, of Crom Castle in the County of Fermanagh, in June 1772, also in the Peerage of Ireland, and was created the 1st Viscount Erne, of Crom Castle, in the County of Fermanagh, in December 1780, again in the Peerage of Ireland (the title being designated 'of Crum Castle' in The London Gazette at the time). He sat from 1800 to 1828 as an Irish representative peer in the British House of Lords. The title of Baron Erne, of Crom Castle in the County of Fermanagh, was created in the Peerage of Ireland in 1768 for his father Abraham Creighton. The 1st Earl was succeeded by his eldest son, the 2nd Earl. On his death, the titles passed to his nephew, the 3rd Earl. He was an Irish Representative Peer from 1845 to 1885 and also served as Lord Lieutenant of County Fermanagh during the same period. In 1876 he was created Baron Fermanagh, of Lisnaskea in the County of Fermanagh, in the Peerage of the United Kingdom. This was to allow the Earls to sit in the House of Lords by right, rather than having to stand for election as Representative Peers. An earlier title of Baroness Fermanagh in the Peerage of Ireland was created for Mary Verney on 13 June 1792, but became extinct on her death on 15 November 1810.

The 3rd Earl also changed the spelling of the family surname from Creighton to Crichton. He was succeeded by his son, the 4th Earl. He was a Conservative politician and served as a Lord of the Treasury in the second Conservative administration of Benjamin Disraeli. Like his father, he was also Lord Lieutenant of County Fermanagh. His grandson, the 5th Earl, held minor office from 1936 to 1939 in the National Government led by Stanley Baldwin and later Neville Chamberlain. Lord Erne was killed in the Second World War. The 6th Earl (often known as Harry Erne), who succeeded in May 1940, was the Lord Lieutenant of County Fermanagh from 1986 until 2012. On his death in December 2015, he was succeeded by his only son, the 7th Earl.

The 3rd Earl is also remembered as the employer of Captain Charles Boycott, whose mishandling of relations with agricultural workers on Lord Erne's estate in County Mayo caused a political and public order crisis and provoked the strategy that gave the English language the term to boycott.

The invented title of Viscount Crichton is used as a courtesy title for the Earl's heir apparent.

The family seat is Crom Castle, near Newtownbutler in the south-east of County Fermanagh in Northern Ireland.

== Barons Erne (1768) ==
- Abraham Creighton, 1st Baron Erne (c. 1700 – 1772)
- John Creighton, 2nd Baron Erne (1731–1828) (created Viscount Erne in 1781)

=== Viscounts Erne (1781) ===
- John Creighton, 1st Viscount Erne (1731–1828) (created Earl Erne in 1789)

=== Earls Erne (1789) ===
- John Creighton, 1st Earl Erne (1731–1828)
- Abraham Creighton, 2nd Earl Erne (1765–1842)
- John Crichton, 3rd Earl Erne (1802–1885) (created Baron Fermanagh in 1876)
- John Henry Crichton, 4th Earl Erne (1839–1914)
- John Henry George Crichton, 5th Earl Erne (1907–1940)
- Henry George Victor John Crichton, 6th Earl Erne (1937–2015)
- John Henry Michael Ninian Crichton, 7th Earl Erne (born 1971)

=== Present peer ===
John Henry Michael Ninian Crichton, 7th Earl Erne (born 19 June 1971), is the son of the 6th Earl and his wife Camilla Marguerite Roberts. Styled formally as Viscount Crichton from birth, he was educated at Sunningdale School, Shiplake College, Henley-on-Thames, and at L'Institut de Touraine, in Tours, France.

On 23 December 2015, he succeeded his father as Earl Erne, of Crom Castle (I., 1789), Viscount Erne, of Crom Castle (I., 1781), Baron Erne, of Crom Castle (I., 1768), and as the Baron Fermanagh, of Lisnaskea (U.K., 1876).

On 4 May 2019, at Holy Trinity Church, Derryvore, Crom, County Fermanagh, near Crom Castle, the family seat which he still owns, Lord Erne was married to Harriet Elizabeth Patterson, daughter of Alan James Patterson; the marriage was conducted by The Rt. Rev. Ferran Glenfield, Church of Ireland Bishop of Kilmore, Elphin and Ardagh.

The heir presumptive is the present holder's second cousin once removed, Charles David Blayney Crichton (born 1953), who has a son, Oliver Charles Martin Crichton (born 1995).

== Title succession chart ==
Title succession chart, Barons Erne, Viscounts Erne and Earls Erne

Abraham Creighton; 1st Baron Erne c. 1700 – 1772
Viscount Erne; Earl Erne
John Creighton; 1st Earl Erne; 1731–1828
Abraham Creighton; 2nd Earl Erne; 1765–1842	Lt. Col. Hon. John Creighton; 1772–1833
Baron Fermanagh (1876, UK)
John Crichton; 3rd Earl Erne; 1802–1885
John Crichton; 4th Earl Erne; 1839–1914
Henry Crichton; Viscount Crichton; 1872–1914	Col. Hon. George Crichton; 1874–1952
George Crichton; 1904–1904	John Crichton; 5th Earl Erne; 1907–1940	David Crichton; 1914–1997
Henry Crichton; 6th Earl Erne; 1937–2015	Charles Crichton born 1953
John Crichton; 7th Earl Erne born 1971	Oliver Crichton born 1995
