= Boycott (disambiguation) =

A boycott is an organized ostracism as a means of protest.

Boycott may also refer to:

== People ==
- Arthur Boycott (1877-1938), British pathologist and naturalist
- Charles Boycott (1832–1897), a British land agent whose ostracism by his local community in Ireland gave rise to the word boycott
- Clare Boycott (born 1993), English cricketer
- Sir Geoffrey Boycott (born 1940), English cricketer
- Rosie Boycott, Baroness Boycott (born 1951), British journalist

== Places ==
- Boycott, Buckinghamshire, a village in the United Kingdom

== Arts and entertainment ==
- Boycott (1930 film), a German film directed by Robert Land
- Boycott (1985 film), an Iranian film directed by Mohsen Makhmalbaf
- Boycott (2001 film), an American film directed by Clark Johnson
- Boycott (2021 film), an American documentary film
- "Boycott" (Twenty Twelve), a 2012 two-part television episode
- Boycott (novel), a 2012 novel by Colin C. Murphy
- Boycott, a 2020 album by Amazarashi
