= John Crichton, 3rd Earl Erne =

Anglo-Irish peer and politician (1802–1885)

The Right Honourable The Earl Erne KP

Lord Lieutenant of County Fermanagh
- In office 1845–1885
- Preceded by: The Earl of Enniskillen
- Succeeded by: The Earl Erne

Personal details
- Born: John Creighton; 30 July 1802
- Died: 3 October 1885 (aged 83)
- Spouse: Selina Griselda Beresford (after 1837)
- Children: 4
- Parent(s): Hon. John Creighton; Jane Weldon
- Relatives: John Creighton, 1st Earl Erne (grandfather)

John Crichton, 3rd Earl Erne, KP (30 July 1802 – 3 October 1885), was an Anglo-Irish peer and politician.

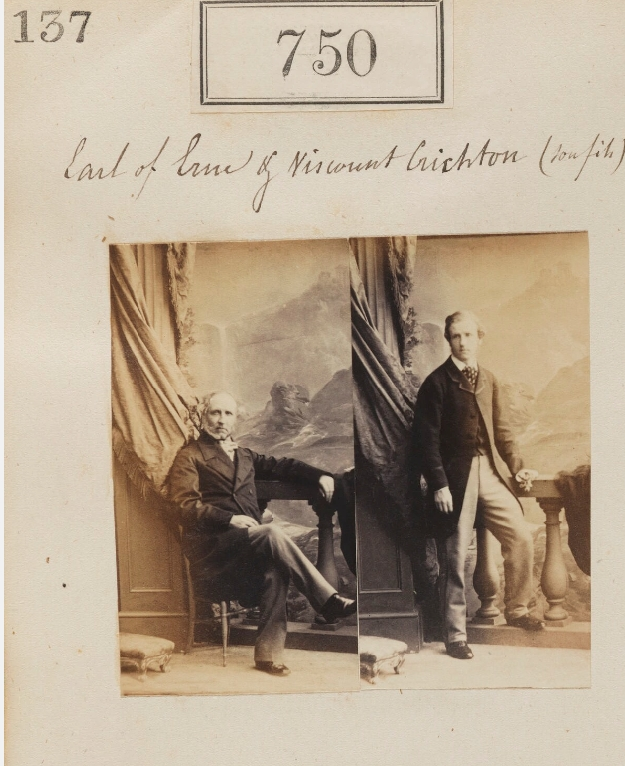
1860 3rd Earl of Erne and Viscount Crichton (future 4th Earl of Erne)

== Early life ==
He was the eldest son of Lt.-Col. Hon. John Creighton, Governor of Hurst Castle and the former Jane Weldon (a daughter of Walter Weldon). His siblings included Maj. Hon. Henry Crichton (who married Elizabeth Hawkshaw), Lt.-Col. Hon. Samuel Crichton, Jane Anne Crichton (wife of Robert Fowler, eldest son of Rt. Rev. Robert Fowler, Bishop of Ossory), Lady Catherine Crichton (wife of the Rev. Francis Saunderson Rural), Lady Helen Crichton, Lady Charlotte Crichton, Lady Mary Crichton (wife of the Rev. John H. King).

His paternal grandfather was John Creighton, 1st Earl Erne (eldest surviving son of Abraham Creighton, 1st Baron Erne) and the former Catherine Howard (sister of The 1st Viscount Wicklow).

== Career ==
In June 1842, he succeeded to the earldom of Erne upon the death of his insane uncle, The 2nd Earl Erne. His uncle Abraham had been an MP for Lifford from 1790 to 1797 before he was declared insane in November 1798 and then incarcerated at Brooke House, London, for the next forty years. Abraham had succeeded to the titles upon the death of his father in September 1828. The third earl subsequently changed the spelling of the family name to Crichton.

In 1845 he was elected an Irish representative peer in the House of Lords, where he remained until his death. He also served as Lord Lieutenant of County Fermanagh from 1845 to 1885. Erne was made a Knight of the Order of St Patrick in 1868 and in 1876 he was created Baron Fermanagh, of Lisnaskea in the County of Fermanagh, in the Peerage of the United Kingdom. This title gave him and his descendants an automatic seat in the House of Lords.

Lord Erne is also remembered as the employer of Captain Charles Boycott, whose mishandling of relations with agricultural workers on Lord Erne's estate in County Mayo caused a political and public order crisis and provoked the strategy that gave the English language the term to boycott.

== Personal life ==
On 6 July 1837, Lord Erne was married to Selina Griselda Beresford, the second daughter of The Rev. Charles Cobbe Beresford (son of John Beresford), Rector of Termonmaguirk, and Amelia Montgomery (a daughter of Sir William Montgomery, 1st Baronet). Together, they were the parents of:

- Lady Louisa Anne Catherine Crichton (1838–1866), who died unmarried.
- John Henry Crichton, 4th Earl Erne (1839–1914), who married Lady Florence Mary Cole, daughter of The 3rd Earl of Enniskillen.
- Hon. Charles Frederick Crichton (1841–1918), who married Lady Madeline Olivia Susan Taylour, eldest daughter of The 3rd Marquess of Headfort and Amelia Thompson (only child of Lord Mayor of London William Thompson), in 1873
- Hon. Sir Henry George Louis Crichton (1844–1922), the aide de camp to King Edward VII. He married Letitia Grace Cole-Hamilton, third daughter of Maj. Arthur Willoughby Cole-Hamilton in 1869. After her death in 1888, he married Lady Emma Baring, only daughter of The 1st Earl of Northbrook, in 1890.

Lord Erne died in October 1885, aged 83, and was succeeded in his titles by his eldest son John, who became a Conservative government minister.

He held 40,000 acres in Fermanagh, Sligo, Donegal and Mayo.

The National Portrait Gallery holds an 1860 photograph of him by the Camille Silvy Studio:

https://www.npg.org.uk/collections/search/use-this-image/?mkey=mw142314

Also 1860 Camille Silvy studio photos of him and his son Viscount Crichton (future 4th Earl of Erne) and of his wife Selina Griselda Crichton (néé Beresford ) the Countess of Erne :

A circa 1870s portrait of the 3rd Earl (of) Erne

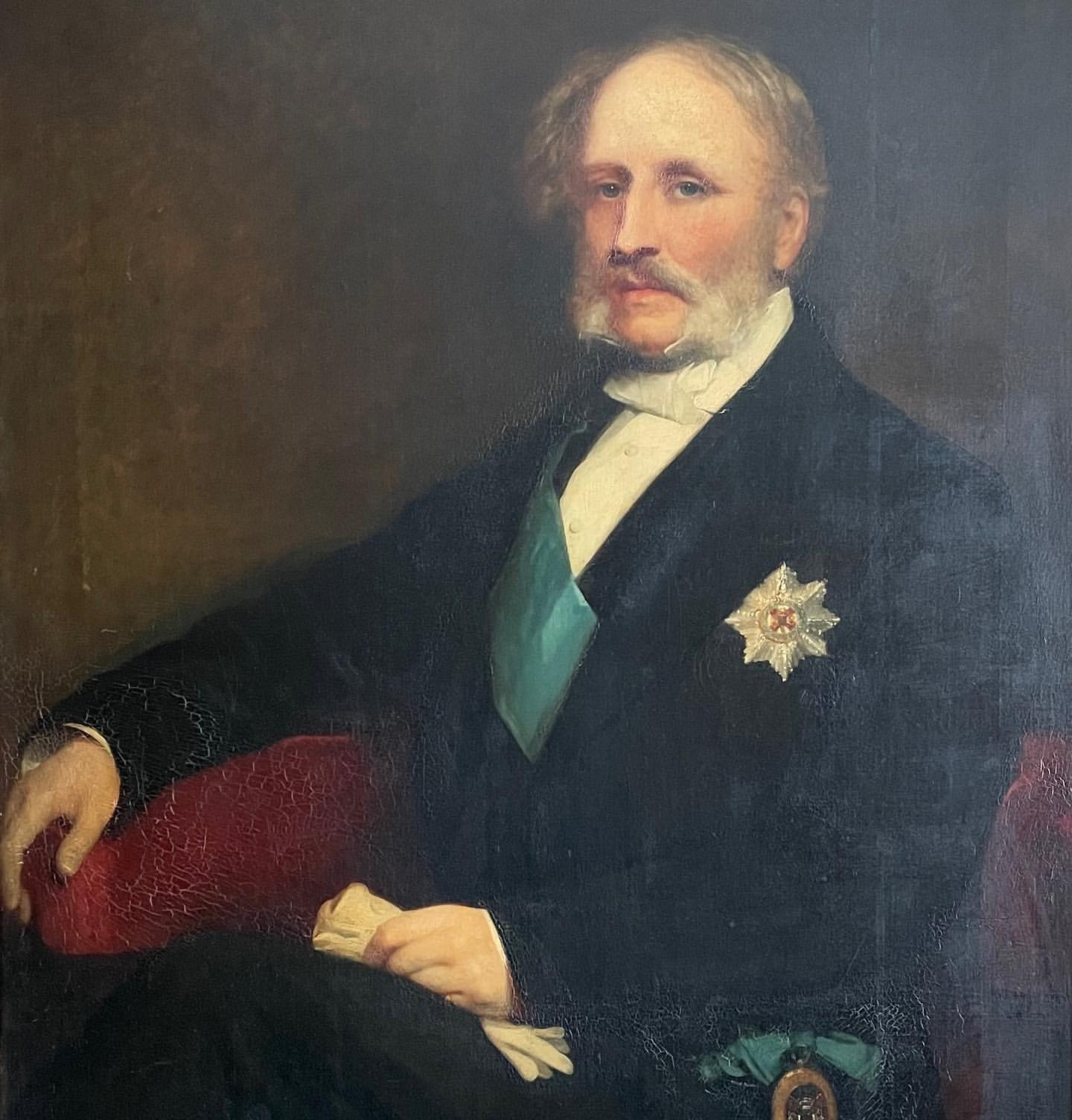
3rd Earl Erne

Honorary titles
Preceded by The Earl of Enniskillen	Lord Lieutenant of Fermanagh; 1840–1885	Succeeded by The Earl Erne
Political offices
Preceded by The Lord Carbery	Representative peer for Ireland; 1845–1885	Succeeded by The Viscount Bangor
Peerage of Ireland
Preceded by Abraham Creighton	Earl Erne; 1842–1885	Succeeded by John Crichton
Preceded by Abraham Creighton	Viscount Erne; 1842–1885	Succeeded by John Crichton
Preceded by Abraham Creighton	Baron Erne; 1842–1885	Succeeded by John Crichton
Peerage of the United Kingdom
New creation	Baron Fermanagh; 1876–1885	Succeeded by John Crichton
