= Lord Lieutenant of Fermanagh =

Ceremonial officer in Fermanagh, Northern Ireland

A list of the Lord Lieutenants of Fermanagh, located County Fermanagh of Northern Ireland, U.K.

The Lord Lieutenant is a ceremonial local government position. There were lieutenants of counties in Ireland until the reign of James II, when they were renamed governors. The office of Lord Lieutenant was recreated on 23 August 1831.

== Governors ==
- Sir John Hume, 2nd Baronet: c.1662– (died 1695)
- Roger Maguire: 1689–1691 (Jacobite)
- James Corry: 1705– (died 1718)
- Henry Brooke: 1709– (died 1761)
- Mervyn Archdall: 1756 –1772
- William Cole, 1st Earl of Enniskillen: –1803 (Governor of Enniskillen) (died 1803)
- Nicholas Hume-Loftus, 2nd Earl of Ely: 1767–1769
- John Creighton, 1st Earl Erne: 1772–1828
- Charles Loftus, 1st Marquess of Ely: –1806 (died 1806)
- Sir John Caldwell, 5th Baronet: 1793– (died 1830)
- Mervyn Archdall: 1813–1831
- John Cole, 2nd Earl of Enniskillen: –1831
- John Loftus, 2nd Marquess of Ely: –1831
- John Creighton: 1830–1831

== Lord Lieutenants ==
- John Cole, 2nd Earl of Enniskillen: 17 October 1831 – 31 March 1840
- John Crichton, 3rd Earl Erne: April 1840 – 3 October 1885
- John Crichton, 4th Earl Erne: 1885 – 2 December 1914
- John Collum: 31 March 1915 – 1948
- John Cole, 5th Earl of Enniskillen: 25 September 1948 – 19 February 1963
- Basil Brooke, 1st Viscount Brookeborough: 26 April 1963 – February 1969
- vacant
- Major-General Thomas Scott: 17 June 1971 – 30 July 1976
- Robert Grosvenor, 5th Duke of Westminster: 7 February 1977 – 19 February 1979
- Viola Grosvenor, Duchess of Westminster: 20 August 1979 – 1986
- Henry Crichton, 6th Earl Erne: 20 August 1986 – July 2012
- Alan Brooke, 3rd Viscount Brookeborough: 2 July 2012 – present

== Deputy lieutenant of Fermanagh ==
A deputy lieutenant of Fermanagh is commissioned by the Lord Lieutenant of Fermanagh. Deputy lieutenants support the work of the lord-lieutenant. There can be several deputy lieutenants at any time, depending on the population of the county. Their appointment does not terminate with the changing of the lord-lieutenant, but they usually retire at age 75.

=== 21st century ===
- 5 May 2000: Mary Blake
- 5 May 2000: Melanie Little
- 5 May 2000: Jane Styles
- 5 May 2000: Rosemary Wilkinson

== See also ==
- List of lord lieutenants in the United Kingdom
