= Burgh St Peter =

Village in Norfolk, England

Coordinates: 52.484°N 1.639°E

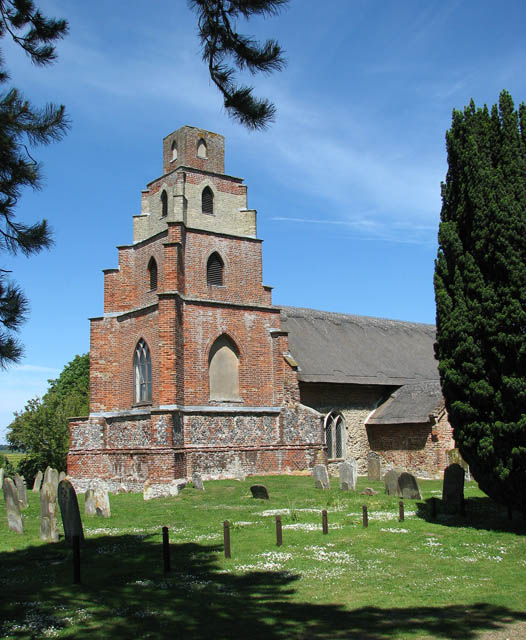
- 18th-century tower of St Mary's parish church

- Location within Norfolk
- Area: 8.41 km^{2} (3.25 sq mi)
- Population: 290 (2021 Census)
  - Density: 34/km^{2} (88/sq mi)
- OS grid reference: TM4693
- Civil parish: Burgh St Peter
- District: South Norfolk
- Shire county: Norfolk
- Region: East
- Country: England
- Sovereign state: United Kingdom
- Post town: Beccles
- Postcode district: NR34
- Dialling code: 01502
- Police: Norfolk
- Fire: Norfolk
- Ambulance: East of England
- UK Parliament: South Norfolk

Burgh St Peter is a village and civil parish in the South Norfolk district of Norfolk, England. It is about 3 1/2 miles (6 km) northeast of Beccles in Suffolk and 17 miles (27 km) south-east of Norwich.

The River Waveney forms the parish boundary to the south, east and north-east of Burgh St Peter, and also forms the county boundary with Suffolk. Low-lying land beside the Waveney forms a series of marshland levels in the parish, the largest of which is Burgh Marshes northeast of the village. The parish covers an area of 3 1/4 square miles (8.4 km^{2}). The 2011 Census recorded its population as 274, with this increasing slightly to 290 at the 2021 Census.

== Parish church ==
The village's first parish church was presumably dedicated to Saint Peter. Its ruins were about 1/4 mile (400 m) southwest of the present parish church, but have disappeared.

The present parish church is next to the Waveney about 2 miles (3 km) east of the village. It is built of flint with some red brickwork. Its earliest parts are 13th-century, including the north and south doors of the nave. The chancel, piscina, sedilia and some of the windows are early 14th-century. The baptismal font is late 14th-century and the timber frame of the nave roof is 15th-century. The chancel roof is newer, but is continuous with that of the nave. Both are thatched.

In the 16th century work began on a west tower of flint with angle buttresses of brick. It is not clear if it was ever completed, but by the late 18th century it was reported to be "ruinous".

In 1793 Rev. Samuel Boycott, who was both lord of the manor and vicar of the parish, was granted a faculty by the Diocese of Norwich to rebuild or complete the tower as his mausoleum. The result is an unusual, possibly unique Georgian Gothic brick tower in which each stage is smaller than those below. Supposedly the design was inspired by a church Boycott's son saw in Italy.

The pulpit was installed in 1811, again at the expense of the Boycott family. A rood screen was added in the late 19th or early 20th century. St Mary's is a Grade II* listed building.

== Windmills ==
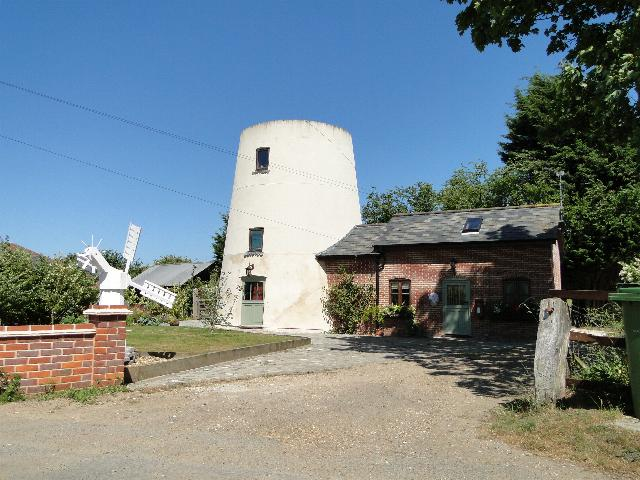
House created from the remains of Burgh St Peter windmill

Burgh St Peter had two tower mills. One ground corn and the other pumped water to drain the land.

The corn mill was a red brick tower built about 1825. It was five storeys high and had four sails. By 1872 an auxiliary steam engine had been installed to work the mill when there was too little wind. By 1937 it was out of use and had lost one pair of sails. It was in a similar condition in 1949, but by 1989 the remaining sails had been removed and the tower had been reduced to three storeys. It has now been converted into part of a house.

The pumping mill was also a brick tower with four sails. It was still intact in 1920.

== Charles Boycott ==
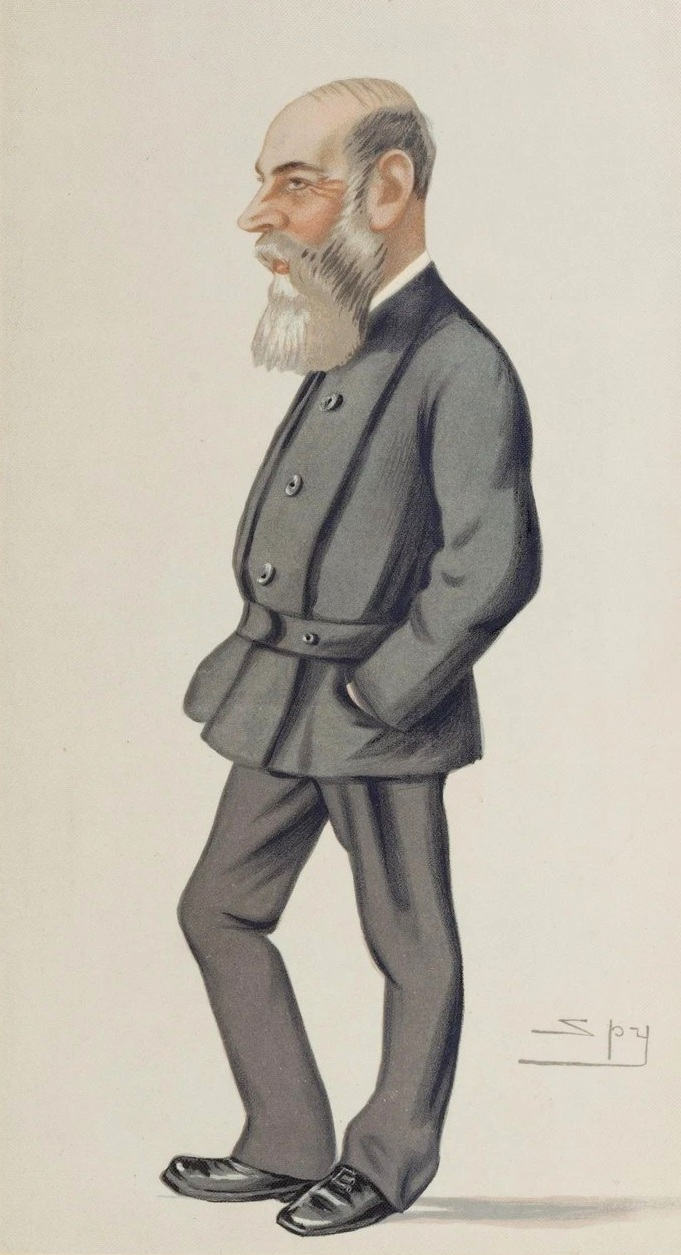
Caricature of Charles Boycott by "Spy" (Leslie Ward) for Vanity Fair in 1881

Charles Boycott, grandson of Rev. Samuel Boycott, was born at Burgh St Peter in 1832 and is buried here. Whereas his father and grandfather were ordained into the Church of England, from 1849 Charles was a captain in the 39th (Dorsetshire) Regiment of Foot serving in Ireland. In 1852 he left the Army and became a farmer outside Ballinrobe, County Mayo in Connacht. In 1873 he became a tenant and the land agent of the Earl of Erne, who was an absentee landlord.

A poor harvest in 1880 led to a rent dispute between the Earl and his poorer tenants. Boycott tried to evict the defaulters but was resisted, and Boycott's workforce either deserted him or was forced out of his service by his opponents, leaving his crops unharvested. Despite help with his harvest by Orange Order volunteers from two counties in Ulster, and protection by the Royal Irish Constabulary and a detachment of the 19th Royal Hussars, Boycott found his position untenable and left Ireland under military escort. The incident led both to land reform in Ireland and to Boycott's name becoming a verb for "a systematic refusal of normal commercial or social relations".

In 1886 Boycott became a land agent at Flixton in Suffolk. He died there in 1897 and was buried at Burgh St Peter, where his nephew Rev. Arthur St John Boycott conducted his funeral.

== Sources ==
- Brown, Lesley, ed. (1993) [1933]. The New Shorter Oxford English Dictionary on Historical Principles. Vol. 1 A–M. Oxford: Clarendon Press. p. 270. ISBN 0-19-861134-X.
- Pevsner, Nikolaus (1962). North-West and South Norfolk. The Buildings of England. Vol. 2. Harmondsworth: Penguin Books. pp. 102–103. ISBN 0-14-071024-8.
