= John Crichton, 4th Earl Erne =

Anglo-Irish peer and Conservative politician (1839–1914)

The Right Honourable The Earl Erne KP, PC (Ire)
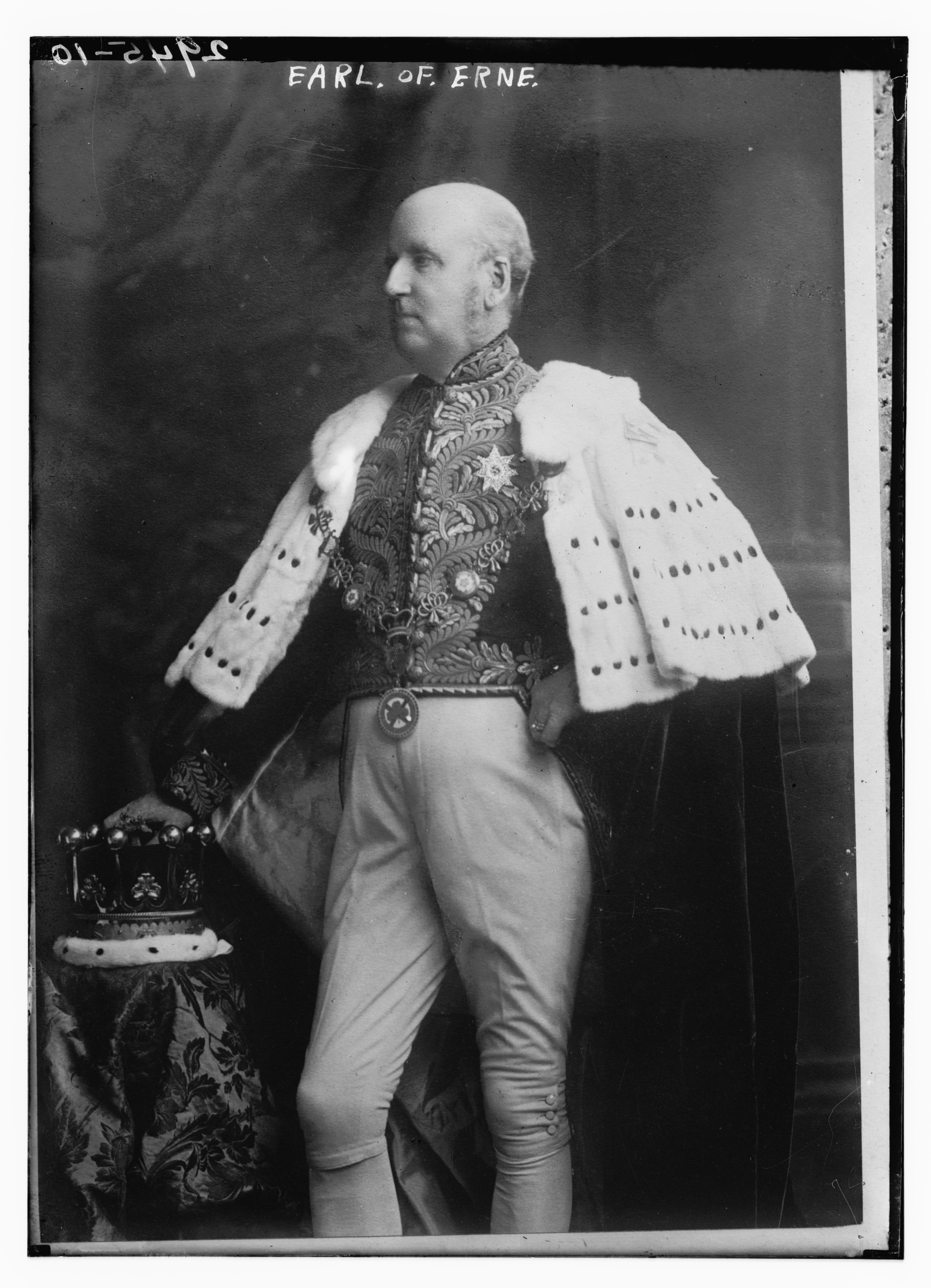
- Photograph of Lord Erne, 1910

Member of Parliament for County Fermanagh
- In office 1880–1885 Serving with William Humphrys Archdale
- Preceded by: Hon. Henry Cole; William Humphrys Archdale
- Succeeded by: Constituency abolished

Member of Parliament for Enniskillen
- In office 1868–1880
- Preceded by: Hon. John Lowry Cole
- Succeeded by: Viscount Cole

Personal details
- Born: John Henry Crichton; 16 October 1839
- Died: 2 December 1914 (aged 75)
- Party: Conservative
- Spouse: Lady Florence Mary Cole (after 1870)
- Children: 5
- Parent(s): John Crichton, 3rd Earl Erne; Selina Griselda Beresford
- Relatives: John Crichton, 5th Earl Erne (grandson); Kathleen Hamilton, Duchess of Abercorn (granddaughter); Gerald Grosvenor, 4th Duke of Westminster (grandson); Robert Grosvenor, 5th Duke of Westminster (grandson)

John Henry Crichton, 4th Earl Erne, KP, PC (Ire) (16 October 1839 – 2 December 1914), styled Viscount Crichton from 1842 to 1885, was an Anglo-Irish peer and Conservative politician.

== Early life ==
Erne was the eldest son of Selina Griselda, Countess Erne (née Beresford), and John Crichton, 3rd Earl Erne. His younger siblings included Col. Hon. Charles Frederick Crichton (who married Lady Madeline Taylour, eldest daughter of Thomas Taylour, 3rd Marquess of Headfort), Lt.-Col. Hon. Sir Henry George Louis Crichton, the aide de camp to King Edward VII, and Lady Louisa Anne Catherine Crichton.

His paternal grandparents were Lt.-Col. Hon. John Crichton, Governor of Hurst Castle, and the former Jane Weldon (a daughter of Walter Weldon). His father had succeeded to the earldom upon the death of his grand-uncle, Abraham Creighton, 2nd Earl Erne (MP for Lifford from 1790 to 1797 who was declared insane in 1798 and then incarcerated at Brooke House, London, for the next forty years). His maternal grandparents were the former Amelia Montgomery (a daughter of Sir William Montgomery, 1st Baronet of Magbie Hill) and the Rev. Charles Cobbe Beresford, Rector of Termonmaguirk. His aunt, Anna Beresford, was the wife of Lord John Thynne (third son of Thomas Thynne, 2nd Marquess of Bath).

There is an 1860 Camille Silvy studio photo of him in the National Portrait Gallery archives:

https://www.npg.org.uk/collections/search/portrait/mw142315/John-Henry-Crichton-4th-Earl-of-Erne?LinkID=mp19479&role=sit&rNo=1

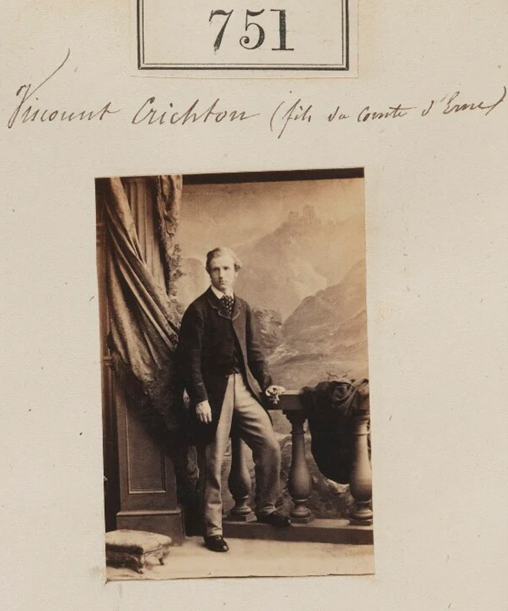
4th Earl of Erne (then Viscount Crichton) - 1860 photo

== Career ==
He was appointed High Sheriff of Donegal for 1867. He was then elected to the House of Commons for Enniskillen in 1868, a seat he held until 1880, and then represented County Fermanagh from 1880 to 1885. Between 1876 and 1880 he served as a Lord of the Treasury in the Conservative administration of Benjamin Disraeli. In October 1885 he succeeded his father as fourth Earl Erne and entered the House of Lords, and served as Lord Lieutenant of County Fermanagh from 1885 to 1914.

He was made a Knight of the Order of St Patrick in 1889; and was appointed to the Privy Council of Ireland in the 1902 Coronation Honours list published on 26 June 1902, being sworn in by the Lord Lieutenant of Ireland, Earl Cadogan, at Dublin Castle on 11 August 1902.

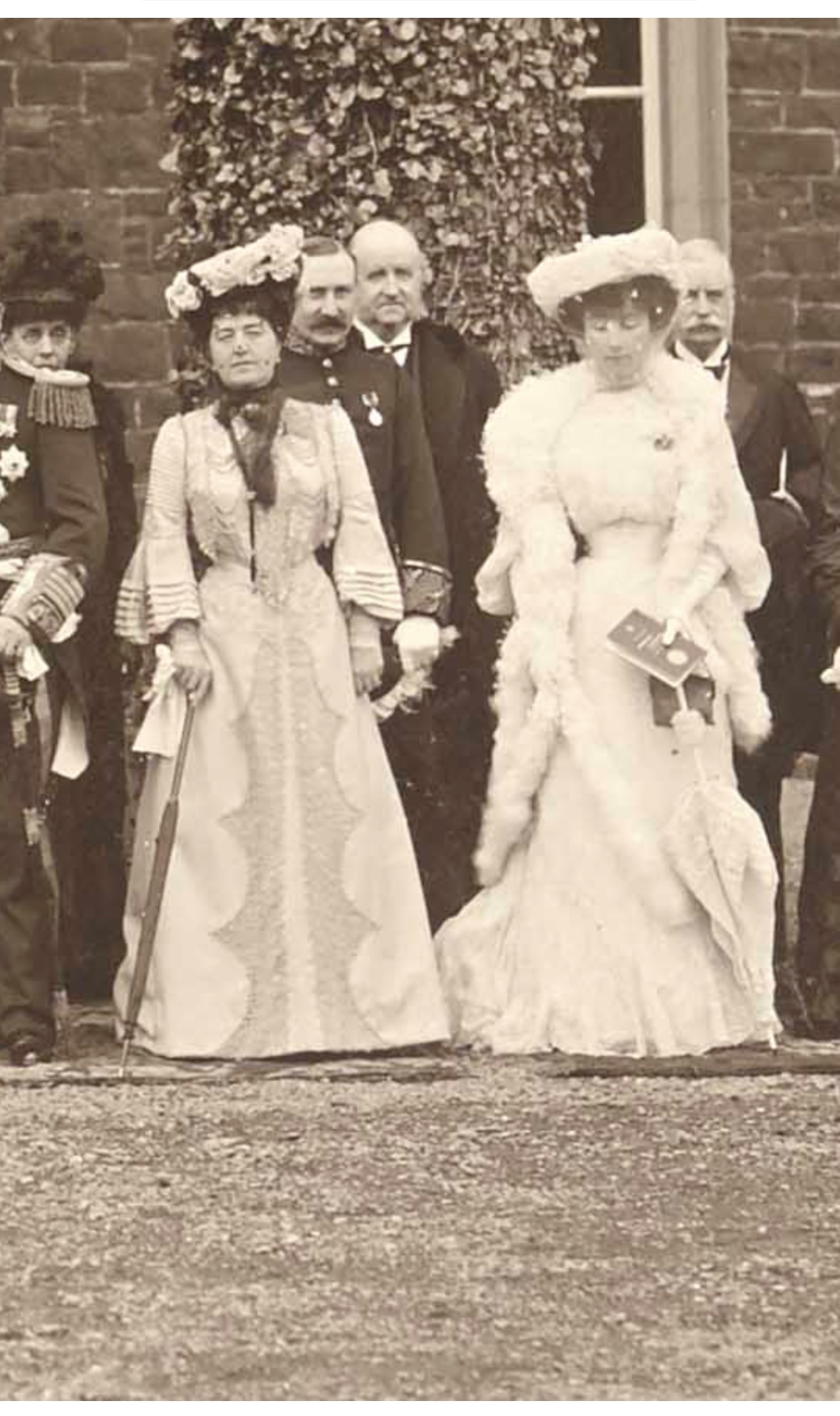
4th Lord Erne (in back middle of photo), 1903

== Personal life ==
On 28 December 1870, Lord Erne was married to Lady Florence Mary Cole, daughter of William Willoughby Cole, 3rd Earl of Enniskillen, and the former Jane Casamaijor (daughter of James Casamaijor). Together, they were the parents of:

- Hon. Henry William Crichton (1872–1914), styled Viscount Crichton, who married Lady Mary Cavendish Grosvenor, a daughter of Hugh Grosvenor, 1st Duke of Westminster and Hon. Katherine Cavendish (third daughter of the 2nd Baron Chesham). After his death in 1914, Lady Mary married Col. the Hon. Algernon Francis Stanley (a son of Frederick Stanley, 16th Earl of Derby).
- Hon. Sir George Arthur Charles Crichton (1874–1952), who married Lady Mary Augusta Dawson, second daughter of Vesey Dawson, 2nd Earl of Dartrey, and Julia Wombwell (eldest daughter of Sir George Wombwell, 4th Baronet) in 1913. He served as Comptroller of the Lord Chamberlain's Office, Extra Equerry to King George V, Edward VIII, and George VI, and Registrar and Secretary Central Chancery of the Orders of Knighthood.
- Hon. Arthur Owen Crichton (1876–1970), who married Katherine Helen Elizabeth Trefusis, third daughter of Col. Hon. Walter Rodolph Trefusis (a son of Charles Trefusis, 19th Baron Clinton) and Lady Mary Montagu-Douglas-Scott (a daughter of Walter Montagu-Douglas-Scott, 5th Duke of Buccleuch), in 1906.
- Hon. James Archibald Crichton (1877–1956)
- Lady Evelyn Selina Louisa Crichton (1879–1955), who married the Hon. Gerald Ernest Francis Ward (1877–1914), the sixth son of the 1st Earl of Dudley.
- Lady Mabel Florence Mary Crichton (1882–1944), who married Lord Hugh William Grosvenor (1884–1914), the sixth son of the 1st Duke of Westminster. After Lord Hugh was killed during the First World War, she remarried to Maj. Robert Hamilton Stubber, a son of Robert Hamilton Stubber, in 1920.

On 30 October 1914, Lord Erne's sons-in-law, Gerald Ward and Lord Hugh Grosvenor, were both killed in action, serving with the 1st Life Guards during the First Battle of Ypres at Zandvoorde. The next day, 31 October 1914, his eldest son Henry, a Major (Brevet Lt.-Col.) in the Royal Horse Guards, was also killed in action, aged 42, and was buried at Zantvoorde British Cemetery in Flanders. Only a month later, Lord Erne himself died on 2 December 1914, aged 75, and was succeeded in his titles by his seven-year-old grandson John, his eldest son having predeceased him.

=== Descendants ===
His grandson, and heir, John Crichton, 5th Earl Erne, was also killed in action, with the 5th Earl's death occurring on 23 May 1940 during the Second World War.

He was a grandfather of Lady Mary Kathleen Crichton, Mistress of the Robes to Queen Elizabeth The Queen Mother, who married James Hamilton, 4th Duke of Abercorn, in 1928.

Through his daughter, Lady Mabel, he was a grandfather of Gerald and Robert, the 4th and 5th Dukes of Westminster.

Parliament of the United Kingdom
Preceded by Hon. John Lowry Cole	Member of Parliament for Enniskillen; 1868–1880	Succeeded by Viscount Cole
Preceded by Hon. Henry Cole; William Humphrys Archdale	Member of Parliament for County Fermanagh; 1880–1885; With: William Humphrys Archdale	Constituency abolished
Honorary titles
Preceded by The Earl Erne	Lord Lieutenant of Fermanagh; 1885–1914	Succeeded by John Ernest Francis Collum
Non-profit organization positions
Preceded by The Earl of Enniskillen	Grand Master of the Orange Institution of Ireland; 1886–1914	Succeeded by Sir James Stronge, Bt
Peerage of Ireland
Preceded by John Crichton	Earl Erne; 1885–1914	Succeeded by John Crichton
Preceded by John Crichton	Viscount Erne; 1885–1914	Succeeded by John Crichton
Preceded by John Crichton	Baron Erne; 1885–1914	Succeeded by John Crichton
Peerage of the United Kingdom
Preceded by John Crichton	Baron Fermanagh; 1885–1914	Succeeded by John Crichton
