= Crom Estate =

Nature reserve in Northern Ireland

Coordinates: 54.16595°N 7.4465°W

The Crom Estate (/ˈkrʌm/, Irish: An Chrom) is a nature reserve located in the south-east of County Fermanagh in Northern Ireland, along the shores of Upper Lough Erne. It is one of three estates owned and managed by the National Trust in County Fermanagh, the others being Florence Court and Castle Coole. The estate comprises 1,350 acres (5.5 km^{2}), composed primarily of riparian forest. Some trees are so ancient that physical access is restricted. Almost all of the current estate is located just inside the boundaries of the Barony of Coole (the island of Inisherk, part of the Crom Castle Demesne, being in the neighbouring Barony of Knockninny).

On 7 May 2026, it was officially announced on Evening Extra on BBC Radio Ulster that Springwatch 2026 would be based at the Crom Estate. This will be the first time that Springwatch has been based in Northern Ireland, and the first time that the programme has been based anywhere outside of the island of Great Britain.

== Features ==
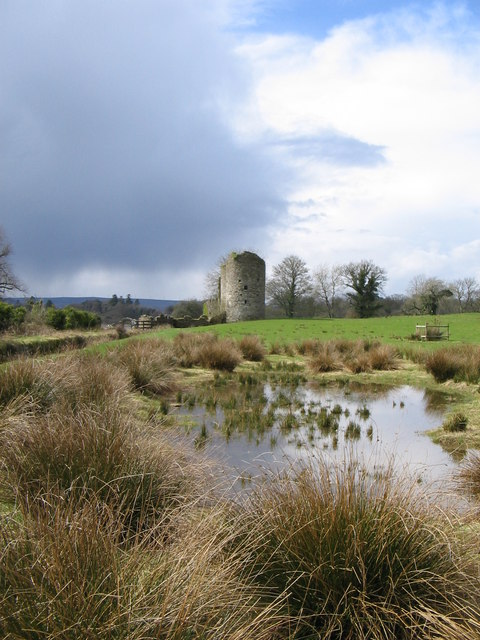
Part of Old Crom Castle

The estate is open to the public for recreational activities and weddings. The ruins of the old castle, a bowling green and garden are tourist attractions. Several cottages are available to rent on the estate.

== History ==
Like many country estates in Ulster, the first house at Crom was built by a Scottish Planter at the beginning of the 17th century. In 1611, as part of the Plantation of Ulster, Michael Balfour, the Laird of Mountwhinney, constructed a house on the lough shore opposite Inishfendra Island. Following the usual pattern for a Plantation castle, it was built of lime and stone and enclosed within a bawn. The castle was invaded twice by Jacobites before it was burnt down in the early 1760s. The ruins of this castle still survive today. In 1840 a new neo-Tudor Crom Castle was built, designed by Scottish architect Edward Blore. It remains the private property of the 7th Earl of Erne and is not open to the public. The estate was given to the National Trust by the 6th Earl of Erne (often known as Harry Erne) in 1987.

The Crom Estate was the location of a great Classic yacht and steamboat regatta in August 2010 when the races of the 1890s were recreated in Trial bay using Norfork Broads One-Designs (brown boats), Lough Erne Fairies, Fife One Designs from Anglesey, and a pair of Colleens. Racing took place on Upper Lough Erne within sight of the castle, and the boats moored each evening off the boathouse in Crom Bay.

== Gallery ==
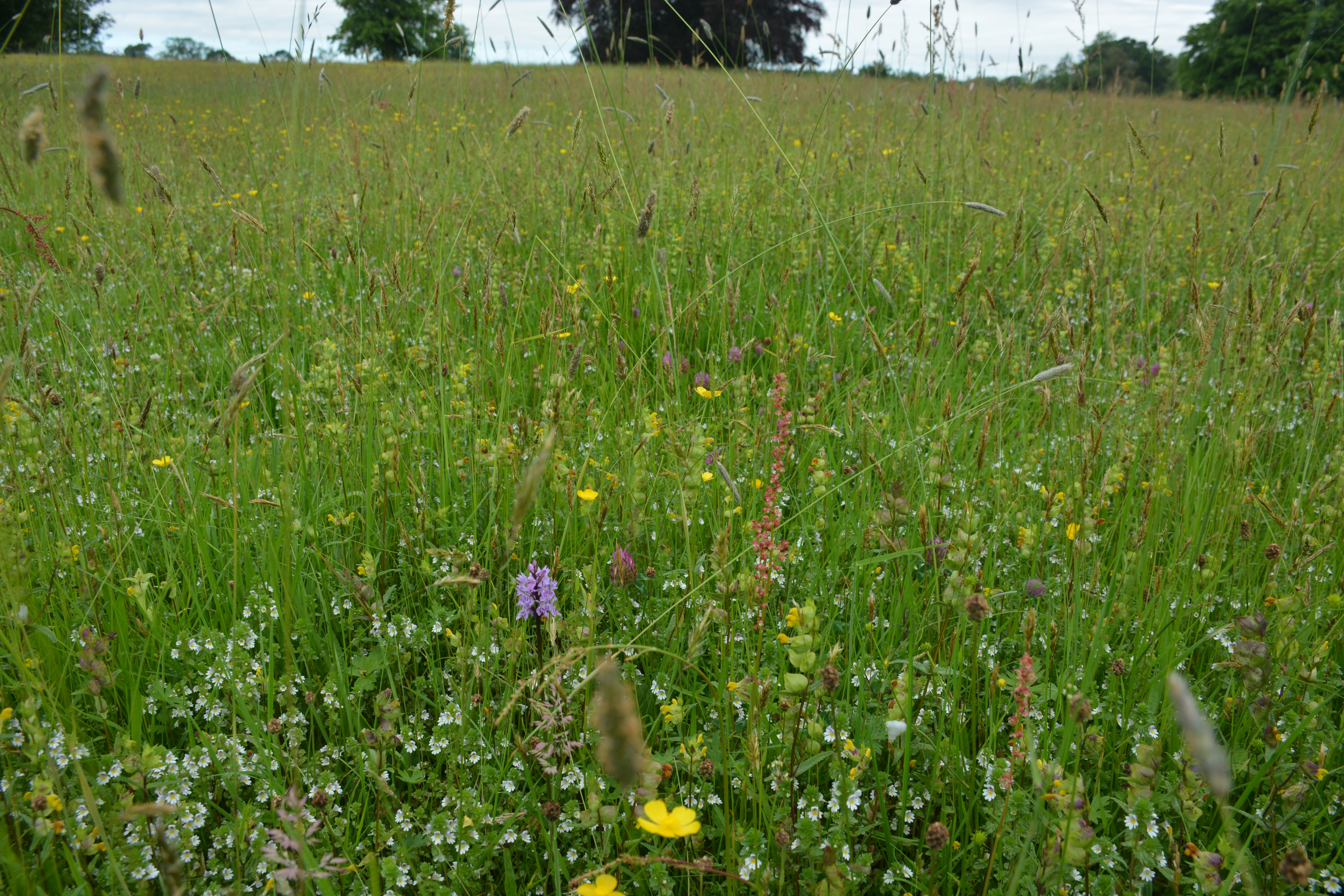
Species-rich grassland in full bloom near the old castle in June 2021

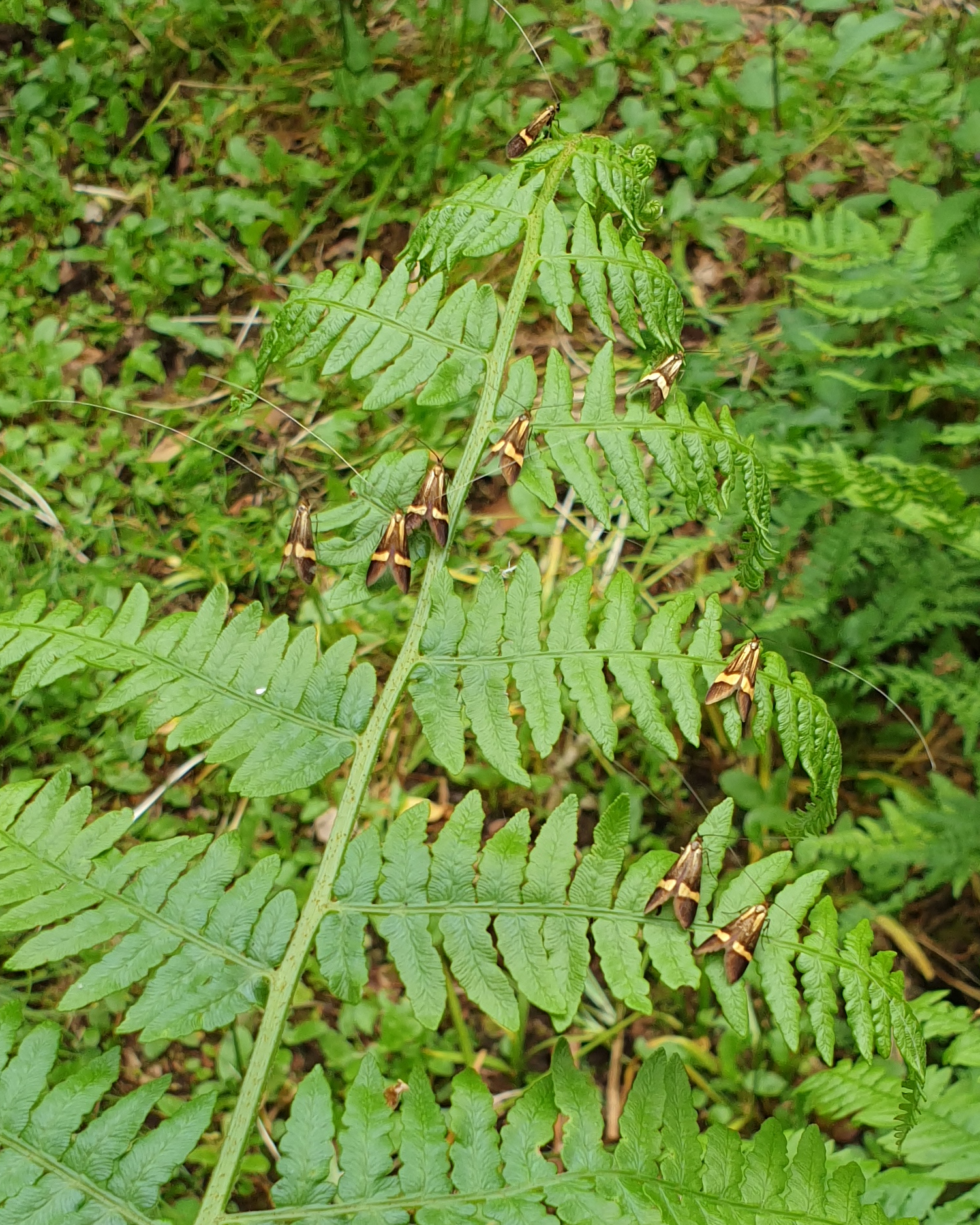
A group of yellow-barred longhorn moths on a Bracken frond
