= Abraham Creighton, 1st Baron Erne =

Irish peer and politician (1703–1772)

Abraham Creighton, 1st Baron Erne (December 1703 – 10 June 1772), was an Irish peer and politician.

He was the only son of David Creighton of Crom Castle and Catherine Southwell, daughter of Richard Southwell. He married Elizabeth Rogerson, eldest daughter of John Rogerson, Lord Chief Justice of Ireland, and Elizabeth Ludlow. They had four surviving children, two sons and two daughters.

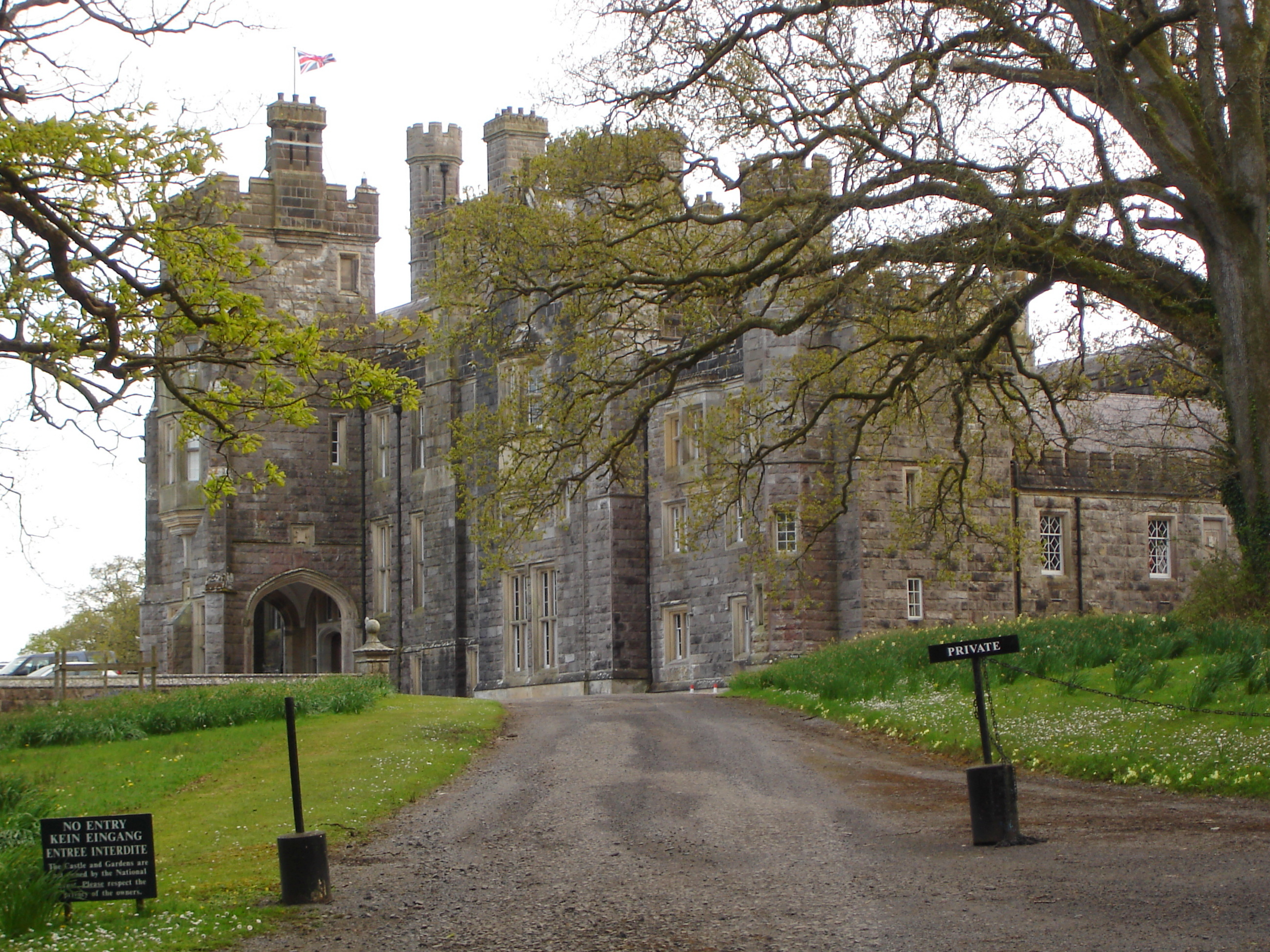
The current Crom Castle

Erne was a major landowner in County Fermanagh, and also had banking interests. He represented Lifford in the Irish House of Commons from 1727 until 1768, when he was raised to the Peerage of Ireland as Baron Erne, of Crom Castle in the County of Fermanagh. He died in June 1772 and was succeeded in the barony by his son John, who was later created Earl Erne.

Up to 1729, Alexander Montgomery shared the parliamentary patronage of Lifford, County Donegal, with the Creighton family, the Earls of Erne. There is an agreement in the Erne papers (held in the Northern Ireland Public Records Office) dated 1727 between Alexander Montgomery and General David Creighton about the sharing of Lifford Corporation and its representation in the Irish House of Commons, to which it sent two MPs. One of the articles of agreement was that, if Montgomery should die without a son, then his interest should pass to the Creightons. Montgomery was elected as an MP for County Donegal in the general election held later on in 1727 so General David Creighton and his son and heir, Abraham Creighton (later the 1st Lord Erne), were returned as the two Lifford MPs. General David Creighton died in 1728 so the Lifford seat was filled by Thomas Montgomery, the nephew of Alexander. On the death of Thomas Montgomery in 1760, full control of the Lifford seats passed to Abraham Creighton.

== Notes ==
Parliament of Ireland
Preceded by Richard Hamilton; David Creighton	Member of Parliament for Lifford; 1727–1768; With: David Creighton 1727–1729; Thomas Montgomery 1729–1761; John Creighton 1761–1768	Succeeded by Abraham Creighton; John Creighton
Peerage of Ireland
New creation	Baron Erne; 1768–1772	Succeeded by John Creighton
