= Abraham Creighton, 2nd Earl Erne =

Irish peer and politician

Abraham Creighton, 2nd Earl Erne (10 May 1765 – 10 June 1842), styled as Viscount Creighton between 1789 and 1828, was an Irish peer and politician.

He was the elder son of The 1st Earl Erne, by his first wife, Catherine Howard. Between 1790 and 1798, he represented Lifford in the Irish House of Commons. In Dublin, he was a member of the Kildare Street Club.

In November 1798, Viscount Creighton was declared insane. He was then incarcerated in Brooke House, London, for the next forty years. On his father's death in September 1828, Lord Creighton became the second Earl, although still incarcerated and officially insane.

He died in 1842, within months of the death of his father's second wife, Lady Mary Hervey, daughter of The 4th Earl of Bristol, Church of Ireland Bishop of Derry. Lord Erne was unmarried and without descendants. The title and the estates, including Crom Castle, passed to his nephew John Creighton, the third Earl. The third Earl subsequently changed the spelling of the family surname to Crichton, which spelling is maintained to this day by the Earls of Erne.

== Notes ==
Parliament of Ireland
Preceded by Abraham Creighton; Edward Cooke	Member of Parliament for Lifford; 1790–1797; With: Abraham Creighton	Succeeded by Abraham Creighton; John Creighton
Peerage of Ireland
Preceded by John Creighton	Earl Erne; 1828–1842	Succeeded by John Crichton
Preceded by John Creighton	Viscount Erne; 1828–1842	Succeeded by John Crichton
Preceded by John Creighton	Baron Erne; 1828–1842	Succeeded by John Crichton
