= John Crichton, 5th Earl Erne =

Anglo-Irish peer, soldier and politician (1907–1940)

The Right Honourable The Earl Erne DL

Personal details
- Born: John Henry George Crichton; 22 November 1907
- Died: 23 May 1940 (aged 32)
- Spouse: Lady Davidema Bulwer-Lytton (m. 1931)
- Children: 3
- Parent(s): Henry Crichton, Viscount Crichton; Lady Mary Grosvenor
- Relatives: John Crichton, 4th Earl Erne (grandfather); Hugh Grosvenor, 1st Duke of Westminster (grandfather)
- Education: Royal Military College, Sandhurst

John Henry George Crichton, 5th Earl Erne (22 November 1907 – 23 May 1940), briefly styled Viscount Crichton in 1914, was an Anglo-Irish peer, soldier and politician.

== Early life ==
Erne was the only son of Henry William Crichton, Viscount Crichton. His mother was Lady Mary Cavendish Grosvenor. On 31 October 1914, his father, a Major (brevet Lt. Colonel) in the Royal Horse Guards, was killed in action, aged 42, during the Great War. (He was awarded a DSO and a MVO, and is buried at Zantvoorde British Cemetery in Flanders.) Only a month later, aged seven, Erne succeeded his grandfather as the fifth Earl Erne. His mother later married Col. the Hon. Algernon Francis Stanley (a son of Frederick Stanley, 16th Earl of Derby), with whom she had one son and a daughter.

His father was the eldest son, and heir apparent, of John Crichton, 4th Earl Erne, and Lady Florence Cole (a daughter of William Cole, 3rd Earl of Enniskillen). His maternal grandparents were the former Hon. Katherine Cavendish (third daughter of the 2nd Baron Chesham) and Hugh Grosvenor, 1st Duke of Westminster, who was considered to be the richest man in Britain at this death. His paternal aunt, Lady Mabel Crichton, married his maternal uncle, Lord Hugh Grosvenor, and was the mother of Gerald and Robert, the 4th and 5th Dukes of Westminster.

He was educated at Ludgrove School. From 1921 to 1924, he serve as Page of Honour to King George V and, later, a Lord-in-Waiting to King George VI.

== Career ==
Erne trained for a military career at the Royal Military College and was commissioned into the Royal Horse Guards in 1927. He was promoted lieutenant in 1930 and resigned his commission in 1934. Becoming an active member of the House of Lords, he served as a Lord-in-waiting, or government whip in the House of Lords, from 1936 to 1939 in the National Government under Stanley Baldwin and later under Neville Chamberlain.

When the Second World War broke out, he was commissioned as a major into the Royal Horse Guards (attd. 12th Royal Lancers, Royal Armoured Corps) and in the North Irish Horse. He was killed in action on 23 May 1940 and was buried at Wormhoudt Communal Cemetery in France.

== Personal life ==
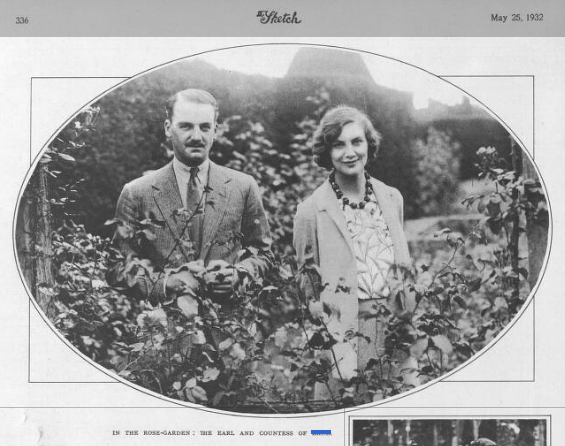
5th Earl Erne and Lady Davina (Davidema) Bulwer-Lytton

In 1931, Lord Erne married Lady Davidema Katharine Cynthia Mary Millicent Bulwer-Lytton (1909–1995), daughter of Victor Bulwer-Lytton, 2nd Earl of Lytton, and Pamela Plowden. Together, they lived at Knebworth, Hertfordshire, and were the parents of:

- Lady Rosanagh Mary Crichton (1932–2019), who married Baron Michael Paul Raben-Levetzau, second son of Count Siegfried Victor Raben-Levetzau, of Denmark, in 1956.
- Lady Antonia Pamela Mary Crichton (born 1934), who married Timothy William Wardell, second son of Brig. Michael Wardell and the former Ruth Irwin Crossley (a daughter of Sir Kenneth Crossley, 2nd Baronet) in 1953. After their divorce, she married Charles William Beckwith in 1981.
- Henry Crichton, 6th Earl Erne (1937–2015), who married Camilla Roberts, elder daughter of the aviator Owen Roberts (a grandson of Marshall Owen Roberts) and a cousin of the 12th Baron Farnham and second cousin of the 10th Duke of Atholl.

Upon his death in 1940, aged 32, he was succeeded in his titles by his two-year-old only son Henry. His widow, Lady Erne, later married the Conservative politician "Monty" Woodhouse, with whom she had three more children, including Christopher Woodhouse, 6th Baron Terrington.

Court offices
Preceded by Iain Arthur Murray	Page of Honour; 1921–1924	Succeeded by Allan Mackenzie
Peerage of Ireland
Preceded by John Crichton	Earl Erne; 1914–1940	Succeeded by Henry Crichton
Preceded by John Crichton	Viscount Erne; 1914–1940	Succeeded by Henry Crichton
Preceded by John Crichton	Baron Erne; 1914–1940	Succeeded by Henry Crichton
Peerage of the United Kingdom
Preceded by John Crichton	Baron Fermanagh; 1914–1940	Succeeded by Henry Crichton
