= John Creighton, 1st Earl Erne =

Irish politician (1731–1828)

John Creighton, 1st Earl Erne, PC (1731 – 15 September 1828), known as The Lord Erne between 1772 and 1781 and as The Viscount Erne between 1781 and 1789, was an Irish peer and politician.

Erne was the eldest surviving son of Abraham Creighton, 1st Baron Erne, and Elizabeth Rogerson, and succeeded his father as second Baron in 1772. Between 1761 and 1773, he represented Lifford in the Irish House of Commons. In 1781 he was created Viscount Erne, of Crom Castle in the County of Fermanagh, and in 1789 he was further honoured when he was made Earl Erne, of Crom Castle in the County of Fermanagh. He sat from 1800 to 1828 as one of the 28 original Irish representative peers in the House of Lords.

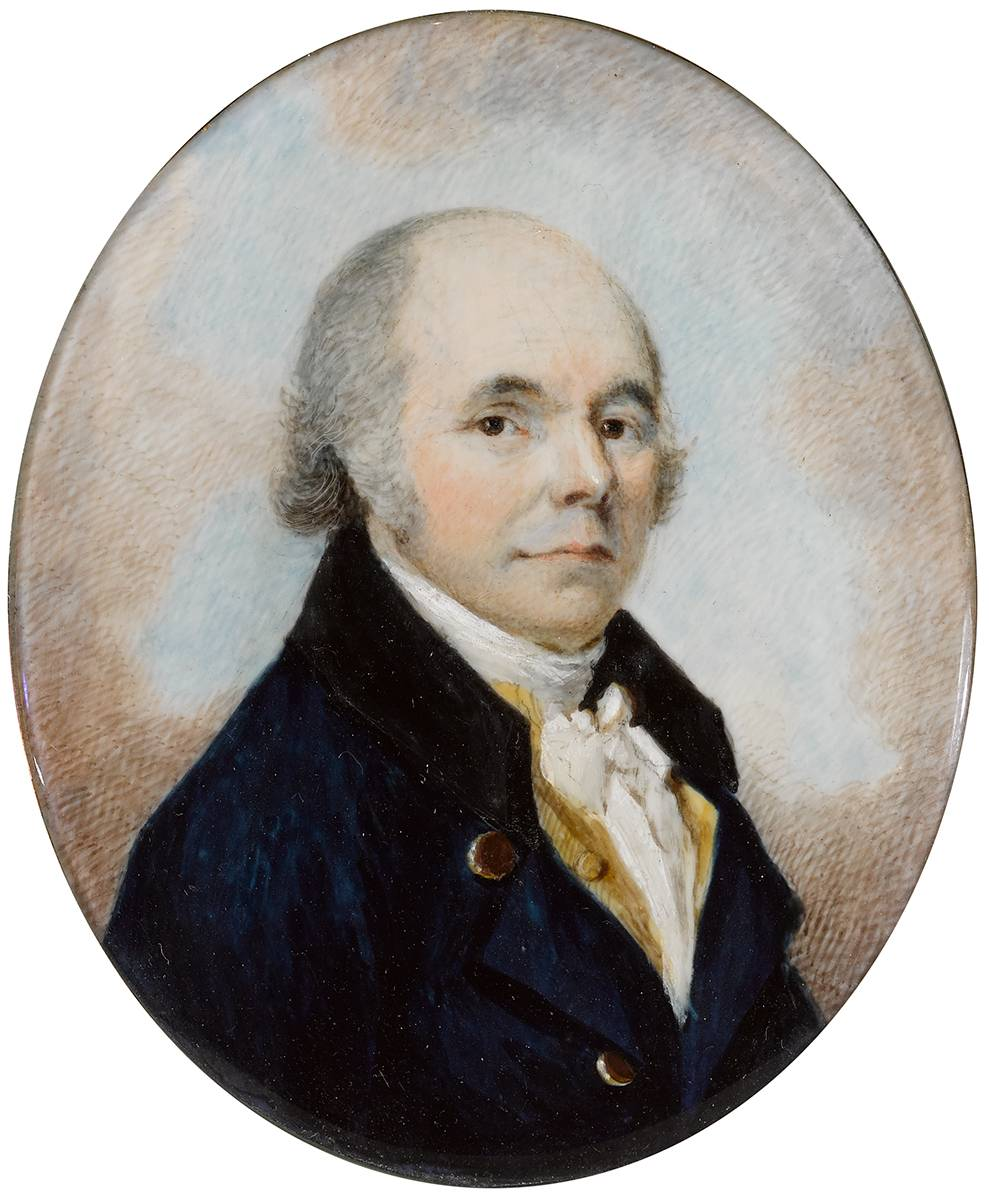
John Creighton 1st Earl Erne (died 1828)

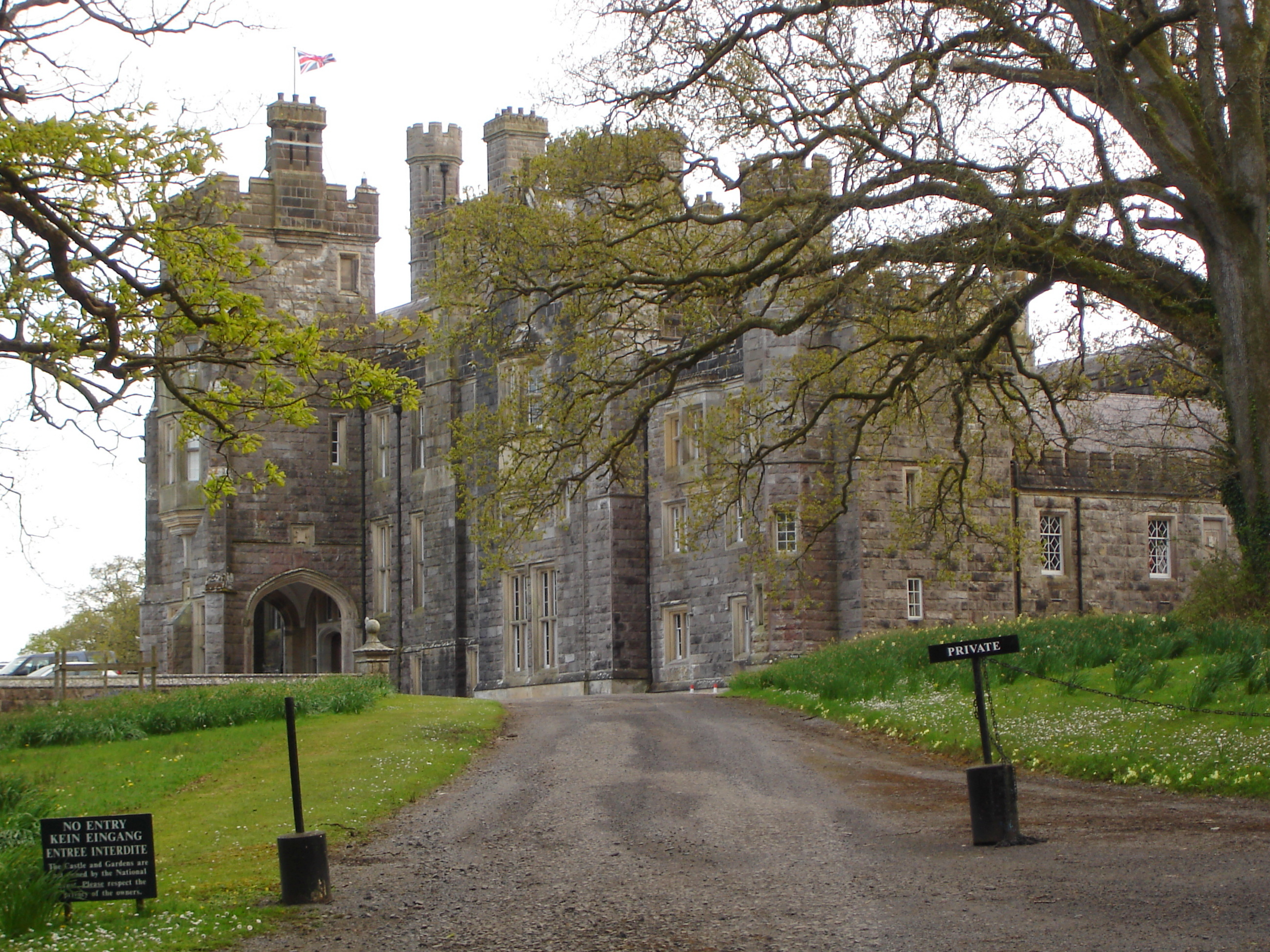
Crom Castle, Lord Erne's ancestral home. Built 1832-1838 to Edward Blore designs with monies left in 1st Earl Erne’s will. Then rebuilt to same designs by George Suddens following 1841 fire. Old Crom Castle (built circa 1611) burnt down in 1764.

== Marriages, children and succession ==
Lord Erne married, firstly, Catherine Howard, daughter of the Right Reverend Robert Howard, in 1761. After her death in 1775 he married, secondly, Lady Mary Caroline Hervey, daughter of The Rt. Rev. The 4th Earl of Bristol, Lord Bishop of Derry, in 1776, although the couple later separated. He died in September 1828, aged 97, and was succeeded in his titles by his eldest son Abraham, who had been declared insane since 1798. His daughter by his second wife, Elizabeth, married the 1st Baron Wharncliffe.

== Sources ==
- Burke's Peerage and Baronetage, 2003, 107th edition
- Kidd, Charles, Williamson, David (editors). Debrett's Peerage and Baronetage (1990 edition). New York: St Martin's Press, 1990.
- Gash, Norman (1984). Lord Liverpool: The Life and Political Career of Robert Banks Jenkinson, Second Earl of Liverpool, 1770-1828. Weidenfeld and Nicolson, London. ISBN 9780674539105.

Parliament of Ireland
Preceded by Abraham Creighton; Thomas Montgomery	Member of Parliament for Lifford; 1761–1773; With: Abraham Creighton 1761–1768; Abraham Creighton 1768–1773	Succeeded by Abraham Creighton; James Cavendish
Parliament of the United Kingdom
New title	Representative peer for Ireland; 1800–1828	Succeeded by The Lord Dunalley
Peerage of Ireland
New creation	Earl Erne; 1789–1828	Succeeded by Abraham Creighton
New creation	Viscount Erne; 1781–1828	Succeeded by Abraham Creighton
Preceded by Abraham Creighton	Baron Erne; 1772–1828	Succeeded by Abraham Creighton
