= Boycott (novel) =

2012 novel by Colin C. Murphy

First edition (publ. Brandon)

Boycott is a novel by Irish author Colin C. Murphy, published in 2012. The story is based on the real-life events in Ireland surrounding Captain Charles Boycott, which led to the word 'boycott' entering the English language.

== Plot ==
Although the events surrounding Captain Charles Boycott that brought him to international attention occurred in 1879–80, the novel has parallel narratives alternating between this period and approximately thirty years earlier. The story centres on two brothers, Owen and Thomas Joyce, and begins when they are youths in 1848, at the height of The Great Famine. As the boys struggle to survive, their experiences (involving, among other things, coffin ships, workhouses, and cannibalism), profoundly shape their attitudes in different ways towards landlordism and Irish freedom from British imperialism.

Thirty years later, Owen is a tenant on the Lough Mask Estate in County Mayo, which is run by land agent Charles Boycott. Boycott refuses to lower the rent and inspired by a famous speech by Charles Stewart Parnell. With the encouragement of the local parish priest Father John O'Malley, the tenants embark on a campaign of ostracism against Boycott and his family. When Boycott writes a letter to the London Times, an editorial it sparks creates widespread interest, attracting international news coverage.

While Owen is at the forefront of the passive resistance campaign of ostracism, his brother Thomas believes that only violence can achieve an end to landlordism and ultimately bring about Irish freedom. The brothers' conflict becomes in effect a reflection of the wider attitude in Ireland during the second half of the 19th century, which saw different factions advocating either violent or non-violent action to achieve their aims.

The novel culminates in the British government despatching a large military force to protect Boycott, which ultimately brings the brothers directly into conflict with each other and provokes disturbing revelations about how they'd survived the famine thirty years beforehand. The novel also employs the device of beginning each chapter with a number of actual contemporary news reports from the international media.

== Themes ==
The novel explores the uses of non-violence or passive resistance as opposed to armed resistance in achieving political and social change. It also examines the question of whether the British Government might have been responsible for an act of genocide in Ireland during the Great Famine, but does not exclude British victims of this often violent and traumatic period in Irish history. The story also demonstrates an early example of how the interest of the international press can elevate a relatively minor event to global importance.

== Reviews ==
Boycott received a generally positive critical response. Writing in the Irish Independent literary supplement, Irish novelist Dermot Bolger said it was 'a valuable piece of writing on a historical level' and 'an engaging labour of love novel that deserves a wide readership.' However, he also felt that the novel was slightly flawed through repetition and that better editing might have prevented 'points being repeatedly hammered home'

Playwright Frank McGuinness described it as 'masterful storytelling... perfectly paced and beautifully written... an impressive achievement.' Lucille Redmond of Books Ireland said it was 'a rattling yarn with the action racing along, brilliant twists, flawed heroes and evil villains', although she felt that 'some of the book's descriptive passages could have been cut by two-thirds without harming the story'.

Sue Leonard of The Irish Examiner described the novel as 'beautifully written, a skilful blend of fact and fiction', and the Irish literary website writing.ie stated, "The story gallops along and keeps the reader attentive and engaged with its lively, vivid, and varied writing."

The Connemara Journal felt that the depiction of Charles Boycott was too 'bombastic', but described the novel as 'gripping' and 'worth a look'. The UK's New Books Magazine said that the novel was 'gripping from beginning to end' and felt that the historical realism was played out 'with vivid imagination, thought and process.' The books review website Goodreads gave Boycott a rating of 4.5 out of 5.
