= George Crichton (courtier) =

English courtier and Army officer

Colonel The Honourable Sir George Arthur Charles Crichton, GCVO (6 September 1874 – 5 March 1952), was an English courtier and Army officer. He was Comptroller of the Lord Chamberlain's Department from 1920 to 1936.

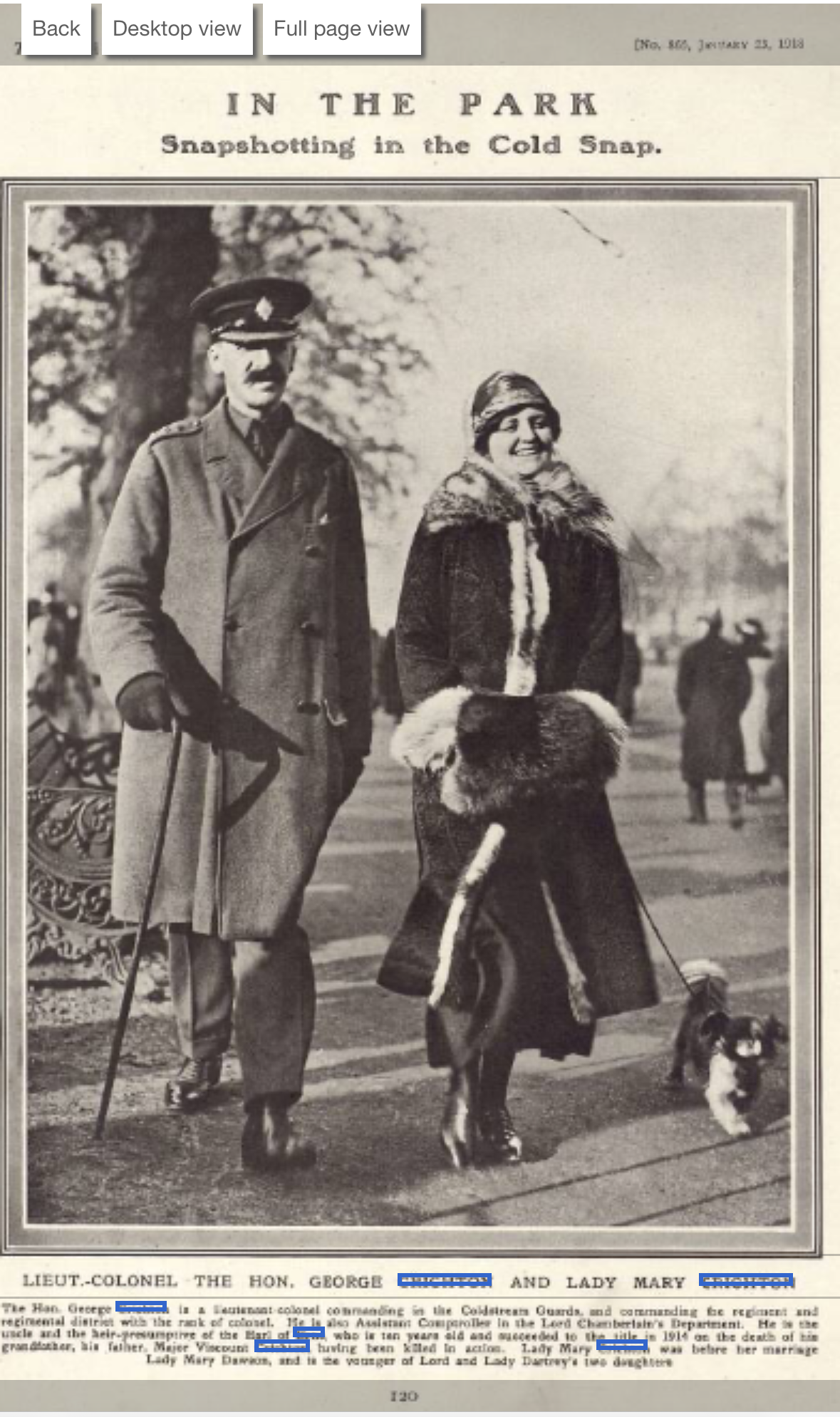
George Crichton

== Early life ==
Born in 1874, Crichton was the second son of the Anglo-Irish peer and politician John Crichton, 4th Earl Erne. He attended Eton College and the Royal Military College, Sandhurst.

== Career and retirement ==
In 1894, Crichton was commissioned into the Coldstream Guards. During the Second Boer War, he was adjutant of the regiment's third battalion and was wounded. He retired from the Army in 1910 as a Major. He returned to the military during the First World War and served as commander of the Coldstream Guards Regimental District from 1917 to 1919, before being placed on the reserve list in 1920.

In 1910, Crichton had been appointed Assistant to the Comptroller of the Lord Chamberlain's Department. In 1920, he was appointed Comptroller of the Department, in which office he served until 1936. He was also an Extra Equerry to George V, Edward VIII and George VI. He was appointed a Member of the Royal Victorian Order in 191 and promoted to Commander in the 1920 Birthday Honours, Knight Commander in the 1924 Birthday Honours and Knight Grand Cross in the 1933 Birthday Honours.

Crichton also served on Berkshire County Council. He died on 5 March 1952. He was survived by his wife, Lady Mary Augusta Dawson (daughter of the 2nd Earl of Dartrey) and their five children: Major David George Crichton, MVO (1914–1997), an army officer, diplomat and journalist who was the Consul-General at Nice from 1970 to 1974; Colonel Richard John Vesey Crichton, CVO, MC (1916–2002), an army officer, courtier, and briefly member of Hampshire County Council who served in the Corps of Gentleman at Arms; Patrick Henry Douglas Crichton, OBE (1919–1998), an army officer and investment trustee; Barbara Mary Cynthia Crichton (1922–1992), who married Lieutenant-Colonel Alastair Malcolm Nicholson, TD; and Mary Bridget Anne Crichton (1927–2004), who married Major John William Burke Cole, JP, DL.
