= John Creighton (British Army officer) =

John Creighton (1772-1833) was an Irish politician and soldier. Creighton was born in County Fermanagh and educated at Trinity College, Dublin. He represented Armagh County from 1797 to 1800 when he became Governor of Hurst Castle. He married Jane Weldon in 1797 and died in 1833. He was the son of John Creighton the First Earl (of) Erne (died 1828), the brother of Abraham Creighton the Second Earl (of) Erne (died 1842) and the father of John Creighton (later Crichton ) the Third Earl (of) Erne(died 1885).

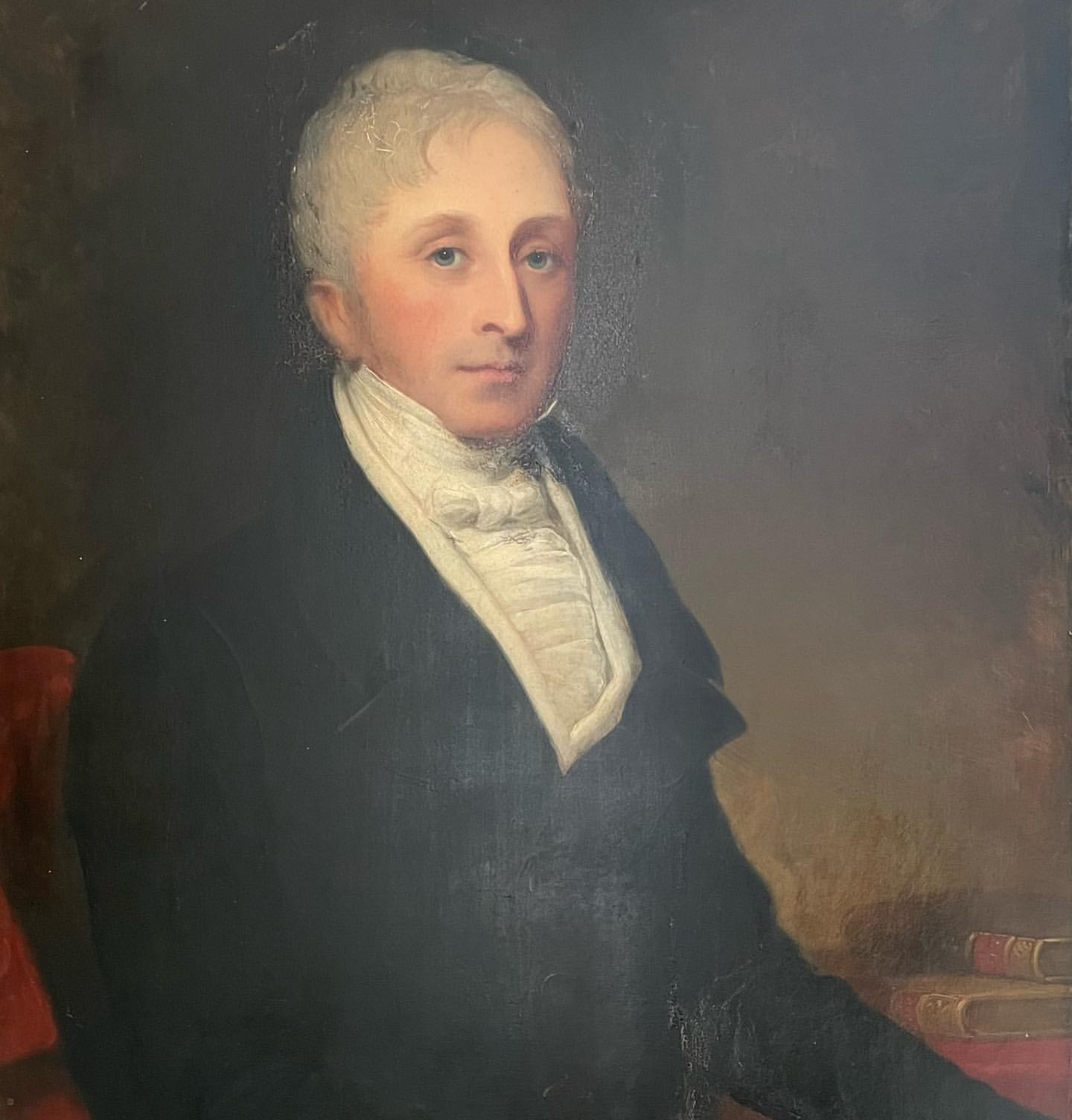
John Creighton (died 1833)(father of Third Earl Erne)
