= Henry Crichton, 6th Earl Erne =

Anglo-Irish peer and Lord Lieutenant of Fermanagh

The Right Honourable The Earl Erne KCVO

Member of the House of Lords (Note: As Baron Fermanagh.)
- Lord Temporal
- as a hereditary peer 23 May 1940 – 11 November 1999
- Preceded by: The 5th Earl Erne
- Succeeded by: Seat abolished (Note: Pursuant to the House of Lords Act 1999.)

Lord Lieutenant of Fermanagh
- In office 1986–2012
- Preceded by: Viola, Duchess of Westminster
- Succeeded by: The Viscount Brookeborough

Personal details
- Born: Henry George Victor John Crichton; 9 July 1937
- Died: 23 December 2015 (aged 78)
- Party: Conservative
- Spouses: Camilla Roberts (m. 1958; div. 1980) Anna Hitchcock (m. 1980)
- Children: 5
- Parent: John Crichton, 5th Earl Erne (father)

Henry George Victor John Crichton, 6th Earl Erne (9 July 1937 – 23 December 2015), was an Anglo-Irish peer and a Lord Lieutenant of Fermanagh. He was known to his family and friends as Harry Erne.

== Biography ==
Lord Erne was the eldest son of the 5th Earl Erne and his wife Davina (Lady Davidema Katharine Cynthia Mary Millicent Bulwer-Lytton), a younger daughter of the 2nd Earl of Lytton, and was a godchild of King George VI.

He inherited his father's titles in 1940, a few weeks before his third birthday, when his father was killed in action in the Second World War. In 1945 his mother married secondly Montague Woodhouse, a Conservative Member of Parliament who in 1998 would succeed his elder brother as the 5th Baron Terrington. In due course he gained two half-brothers, Christopher (now 6th Baron Terrington) and Nicholas, and a half-sister, Emma Davinia Mary.

He was educated at Eton. In 1952, he was briefly a Page of Honour to George VI and continued in the same capacity after Elizabeth II came to the throne, until 1954. From 1960 to 1968, he was a junior officer in the North Irish Horse.

He was a member of the Royal Ulster Agricultural Society and the Royal Forestry Society and was Lord Lieutenant of Fermanagh from 1986 to 2012. Erne was appointed Knight Commander of the Royal Victorian Order (KCVO) in the 2012 New Year Honours List, for his services as Lord-Lieutenant.

He died on 23 December 2015, aged 78.

== Marriages and children ==
On 5 November 1958, Lord Erne married Camilla Roberts, elder daughter of the aviator Owen Roberts, himself grandson of wealthy American businessman Marshall Owen Roberts. She was a cousin of the 12th Baron Farnham and second cousin of the 10th Duke of Atholl. They had five children:

- Lady Cleone Lucinda Crichton (born 27 August 1959)
- Lady Davina Jane Crichton (born 25 June 1961)
- Lady Katherine Patricia Crichton (born 4 November 1962)
- Lady Tara Guinevere Crichton (born 9 May 1967)
- John Henry Michael Ninian Crichton, 7th Earl Erne (born 19 June 1971)

In 1980 he was divorced from his first wife, and on 21 June 1980 he married Anna Hitchcock, née Bjorck, who survives him.

== Honours and medals ==
Country	Date	Appointment	Ribbon	Post-nominal letters	Notes
United Kingdom	31 December 2011	Knight Commander of the Royal Victorian Order		KCVO	for services as Lord-Lieutenant
United Kingdom	2 June 1953	Queen Elizabeth II Coronation Medal			for services as a page at the coronation
United Kingdom	6 February 2002	Queen Elizabeth II Golden Jubilee Medal			
United Kingdom	6 February 2012	Queen Elizabeth II Diamond Jubilee Medal			

== Notes ==
Court offices
Preceded by Hon. Charles Wilson	Page of Honour; 1952–1954	Succeeded by Hon. Anthony Tryon
Honorary titles
Preceded by Viola, Duchess of Westminster	Lord Lieutenant of Fermanagh; 1986–2012	Succeeded by The Viscount Brookeborough
Peerage of Ireland
Preceded by John Crichton	Earl Erne; 1940–2015	Succeeded by John Crichton
Preceded by John Crichton	Viscount Erne; 1940–2015	Succeeded by John Crichton
Preceded by John Crichton	Baron Erne; 1940–2015	Succeeded by John Crichton
Peerage of the United Kingdom
Preceded by John Crichton	Baron Fermanagh; 1940–2015; Member of the House of Lords (1940–1999)	Succeeded by John Crichton
