= Crom Castle =

House in County Fermanagh, Northern Ireland

Coordinates: 54.16233°N 7.44427°W

Crom Castle (Irish: Caisleán na Croime) is a country house on the shores of Upper Lough Erne in County Fermanagh, Northern Ireland. It is the seat of the Earls Erne

Crom Castle - panorama

Standing within the 1,900-acre (7.7 km^{2}) Crom Estate and a formal garden, the castle is built of stone. A central battlemented tower includes the main entrance, and there are also smaller towers to one side. It stands apart from the ruins of Old Crom Castle, of which two towers, some walls, and a ha-ha survive, and near two ancient yew trees believed to be at least 800 years old.

== History ==
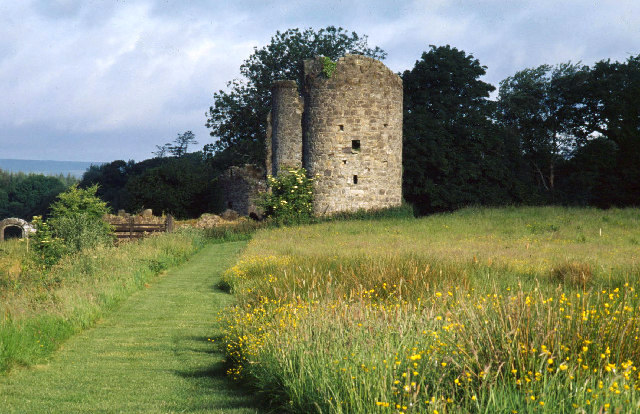
Ruins of the Old Crom Castle

Like many country estates in Ulster, the first house at Crom was built by a Scottish planter in the early 17th century. In 1611, as part of the Plantation of Ulster, Michael Balfour, the Laird of Mountwhinney, constructed a house on the lough shore opposite Inishfendra Island. Following the typical pattern for a Plantation castle, the Old Castle at Crom was built of lime and stone and enclosed within a bawn.

In 1689, the Old Crom Castle survived two Jacobite sieges during the Williamite War in Ireland. The Creighton (or Crichton) family under Colonel Abraham Creighton held out against the Jacobites until reinforcements from Enniskillen arrived. The local conflict concluded at what later became known as the Battle of Newtownbutler in July 1689, when a Williamite force of less than 1,500 Enniskillen troops captured or killed up to 3,000 of King James II's soldiers. The main part of the battle took place at the townland of Kilgarrett, 1 mile south of the village of Achadh Gé or 'Newtown' (later renamed as Newtownbutler).

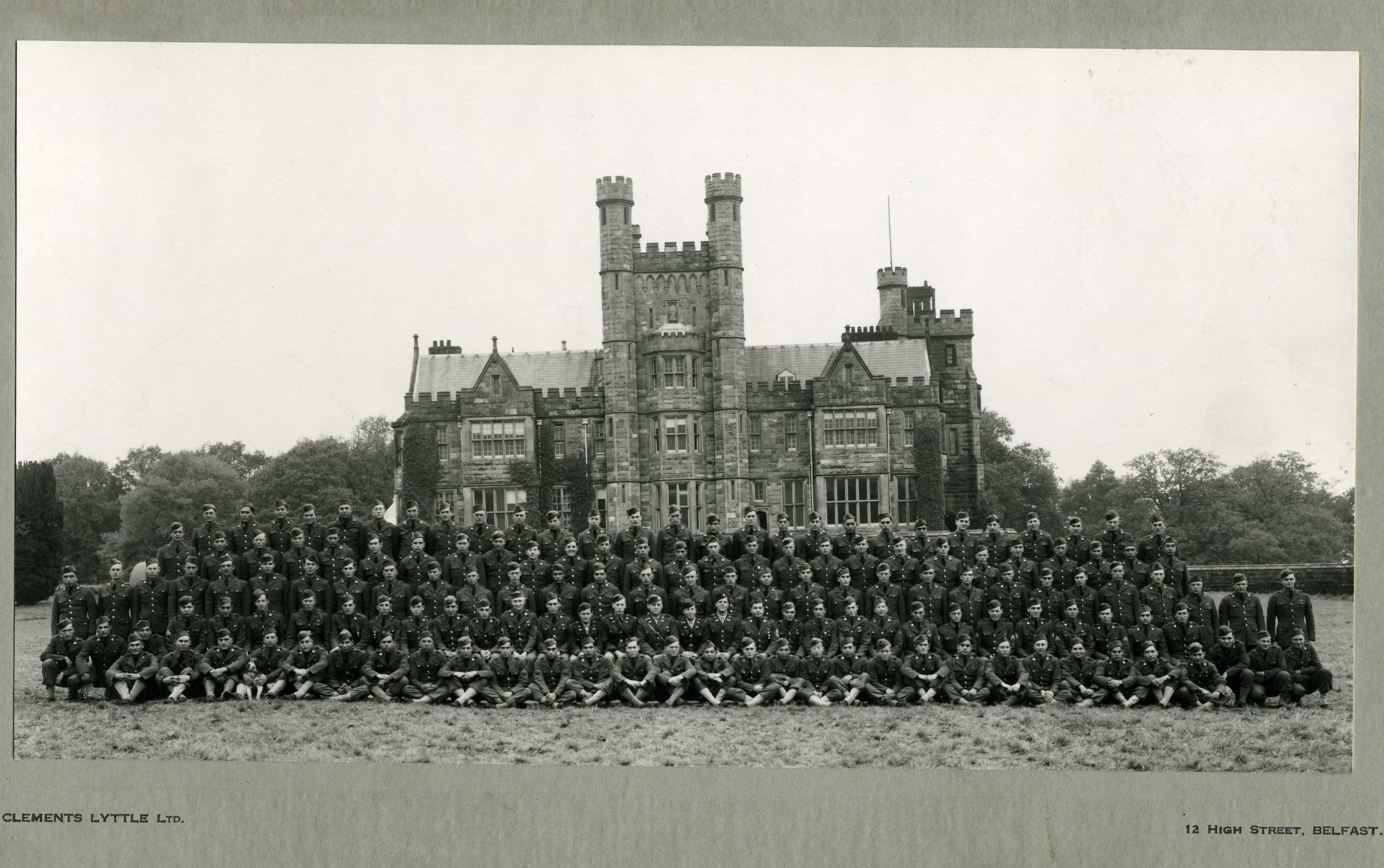
U.S. troops outside Crom Castle during the Second World War

In 1764, the Old Castle was destroyed by a domestic fire. In 1840, the present-day Crom Castle was built, designed by English architect Edward Blore.

In 1987, Henry Crichton, 6th Earl Erne (often known as Harry Erne) gave the estate to the National Trust to manage. The castle itself remains the private property of John Crichton, the 7th Earl of Erne (or John Erne), but is available for hire.

The Crom Estate was the location of a great classic yacht and steamboat regatta in August 2010, when the races of the 1890s were recreated in Trial Bay using Norfolk Broads One-Designs (brown boats), Lough Erne Fairies, Fife One Designs from Anglesey (Welsh: Ynys Môn), and a pair of Colleens. Races took place on Upper Lough Erne within sight of the castle, and the boats moored each evening off the boathouse in Crom Bay.

Crom Castle Loyal Orange Lodge 1219 is a lodge of the Orange Order based at the Crom Estate, occupying the former laundry. It dates back to the time of John Crichton, 4th Earl Erne, who served as Grand Master of the Grand Orange Lodge of Ireland from 1886 until his death in 1914.

== Boathouse ==
The castle's boathouse on the shore of Upper Lough Erne was rebuilt in 1841 by George Sudden in Tudor style. It has arched doors and windows at ground-floor level. Upstairs is a room which overlooks the lake.

Before the 20th century, much travelling in County Fermanagh was most easily done on Lough Erne, and visiting guests would often arrive at the boathouse. Now empty and unused, except by the Earl of Erne, it was once the home of the Erne Yacht Club.

== The West Wing ==
The castle remains privately owned by the Earl of Erne, but accommodation in the West Wing is available year-round.

== In popular culture ==
The 2013 BBC television adaptation of P. G. Wodehouse's Blandings was filmed on location at Crom Castle. The series portrays the fictional Blandings Castle in Shropshire.

== See also ==
- List of castles in Northern Ireland
