= Lifford (Parliament of Ireland constituency) =

Pre-1801 Irish constituency

- Former borough constituency for the Irish House of Commons
- County: County Donegal
- Borough: Lifford

–1801
- Replaced by: Disfranchised

Lifford was a constituency represented in the Irish House of Commons until 1800.

== Members of Parliament ==
Election	First MP	Second MP
1613	Francis Blundell	William Disney
July 1634	Roger Mainwaring (Note: Also elected for Banagher, for which he chose to sit.)	Jerome Alexander
October 1634	Matthew Mainwaring	Jerome Alexander
1639	William Wandesford	Robert Nettleton
1661	Edward Tarleton	Hugh Berkeley
1692	Hugh Hamill	John Montgomery
1698	Hugh Hamill	Robert King
1703	Hugh Hamill	David Creighton
1709	Robert King	David Creighton
1711	Michael Sampson	David Creighton
1719	Richard Hamilton	David Creighton
1727	Abraham Creighton	David Creighton
1729	Abraham Creighton	Thomas Montgomery
1761	Abraham Creighton	John Creighton
1768	Abraham Creighton	John Creighton
1773	Abraham Creighton	James Cavendish
1776	Abraham Creighton	Sir Nicholas Lawless
1789	Abraham Creighton	Edward Cooke
1790	Abraham Creighton	Viscount Creighton
1798	Abraham Creighton	John Creighton
1801	Disenfranchised	
