= Creighton (name) =

Creighton is a Scottish and Irish habitational name that comes from the barony of Crichton in Midlothian, Scotland. It is derived from Gaelic crìoch (border) and Middle English tune (settlement). Notable people with the name include:

== Given name ==
- Creighton Abrams (1914–1974), United States Army General
- Creighton Burns (1925–2008), Australian journalist and academic
- Creighton Carvello (1944–2008), British mnemonist
- Creighton Tull Chaney (1906–1973), American actor better known as Lon Chaney Jr.
- Creighton Gubanich (born 1972), American professional baseball player
- Creighton Hale (1882–1965), Irish-American actor born Patrick Fitzgerald
- Creighton Miller (1922–2002), American football player and attorney
- Creighton Redman (born 1933), British rower
- Creighton Leland Robertson (1944–2014), bishop of the Episcopal Diocese of South Dakota

== Surname ==
- Abraham Creighton (disambiguation)
  - Abraham Creighton (died 1706), MP for County Fermanagh and Enniskillen
  - Abraham Creighton, 1st Baron Erne (1703–1772)
  - Abraham Creighton (died 1809), MP for Lifford
  - Abraham Creighton, 2nd Earl Erne (1765–1842)
- Adam Creighton (ice hockey) (born 1965), Canadian ice hockey player
- Adam Creighton (journalist), Australian economist and journalist
- Anthony Creighton (1922–2005), British playwright
- Billy Creighton (1892–1970), Canadian ice hockey player
- Brandon Creighton (born 1970), American politician
- Breen Creighton, Australian professor of law
- Charles Creighton (disambiguation)
  - Charles Creighton (physician) (1847–1927), British physician, opponent of vaccination
  - Charles F. Creighton (1863–1907), Attorney General of the Kingdom of Hawaii
  - Charles W. Creighton (1885–1947), American politician and lawyer
- Chris Creighton (born 1969), American football coach
- D. F. Creighton (1858–1936), American architect, mechanical engineer, and construction manager
- Dave Creighton (1930–2017), Canadian ice hockey player
- David Creighton (1843–1917), Canadian businessman and politician
- Donald Creighton (1902–1979), Canadian historian
- Donna Creighton (born 1985), British bobsledder and skeleton racer
- Edward Creighton (1820–1874), American pioneer businessman
- Ernest Creighton (1859–1931), English first-class cricketer
- Eugene Creighton, First Nation Judge of the Provincial Court of Alberta, Canada
- Frank W. Creighton (1879–1948), American Episcopal bishop
- Fred Creighton (1930–2011), Canadian ice hockey player and coach
- Guy Creighton (born 1949), Australian equestrian
- Harriet Creighton (1909–2004), American botanist, geneticist and educator
- Helen Creighton (1899–1989), Canadian folklorist
- James Creighton (disambiguation)
  - James Creighton (ice hockey) (1850–1930), Canadian ice hockey pioneer
  - James Edwin Creighton (1861–1924), American philosopher
  - James Forbes Creighton (1879–1944), Canadian physician and politician
  - James George Aylwin Creighton or J.G.A. Creighton, father of organized ice hockey
  - James M. Creighton (1856–1946), American architect
  - Jim Creighton (1841–1862), American baseball player
  - Jim Creighton (basketball) (born 1950), American basketball player
  - Jimmy Creighton (1905–1990), Canadian ice hockey player
- Joanne V. Creighton (born 1942), American academic and President of Mount Holyoke College, South Hadley, Massachusetts
- John Creighton (disambiguation)
  - John Creighton (archaeologist), British archaeologist and academic
  - John Creighton (British Army officer) (1772–1833), MP for Lifford (Parliament of Ireland constituency)
- John Creighton, American naval officer involved in the Little Belt affair in 1811
  - John Creighton (judge) (1721–1807), Canadian lawyer and judge
  - John Creighton (Nova Scotia politician) (1794–1878), Canadian lawyer and politician
  - John Creighton (priest) (fl. 1643–1670), Irish Chancellor of Christ Church Cathedral and Dean of Ferns
  - John Creighton (rugby union) (1937–2022), New Zealand rugby union player
  - John Creighton (surgeon) (1768–1827), Irish president of the Royal College of Surgeons in Ireland
  - John Creighton (warden) (1817–1885), Canadian merchant, politician and prison official
  - John Creighton, 1st Earl Erne (1731–1828), Irish peer
  - John A. Creighton (1831–1907), American pioneer businessman
  - John Oliver Creighton (born 1943), American astronaut
  - John W. Creighton Jr. (1932–2020), American businessman
  - John Creighton, American naval officer involved in the Little Belt affair in 1811
- Louise Creighton (1850–1936), British author
- Lucinda Creighton (born 1980), Irish Fine Gael politician
- Mandell Creighton (1843–1901), British historian and bishop
- Margaret Creighton, American historian, writer and professor emerita at Bates College, Maine
- Mark Creighton (born 1981), English professional footballer
- Mary Frances Creighton (1899–1936s–1936), convicted American murderer, executed in 1936
- Mary Lucretia Creighton (1834–1876), American philanthropist
- Michael Creighton (disambiguation)
  - Michael Cyril Creighton, American actor and writer
  - Michael W. Creighton, bishop of the Episcopal Diocese of Central Pennsylvania
- Milan Creighton (1908–1998), American football player and coach
- Neal Creighton (born 1965), American entrepreneur
- Richard D. Creighton (1924–1988), Korean War flying ace
- Shaun Creighton (born 1967), Australian long-distance runner
- Thomas Creighton (prospector) (20th Century), Canadian prospector
- Thomas C. Creighton (1945–2022), American politician
- Thomas H. Creighton (1865–1942), American lawyer and politician
- William Creighton (disambiguation)
  - William Creighton Jr. (1778–1851), American attorney, banker and politician
  - William Black Creighton (1864–1946), Canadian social reformer
  - William Steel Creighton (1902–1973), American myrmecologist and taxonomist
  - William Creighton (bishop) (1909–1987), American Episcopal bishop

== Characters ==
- Creighton Bernette, a character from Treme season 1

== See also ==
- Crighton, a surname
