= John Creighton =

John Creighton may refer to:

- John Oliver Creighton (born 1943), American astronaut
- John W. Creighton Jr. (1932–2020), American businessman
- John Creighton, 1st Earl Erne (1731–1828), Irish peer
- John Creighton (British Army officer) (1772–1833), son of the preceding, MP for Lifford
- John Creighton, American naval officer involved in the Little Belt affair in 1811
- John Creighton (archaeologist), British archaeologist
- John Creighton (judge) (1721–1807), lawyer and judge in Nova Scotia
- John Creighton (warden) (1817–1885), merchant, politician and prison official in Ontario, Canada
- John Creighton (Nova Scotia politician) (1794–1878), lawyer and politician in Nova Scotia, Canada
- John A. Creighton (1831–1907), businessman in Omaha, Nebraska
- John Creighton (rugby union) (1937–2022), New Zealand rugby union player
- John Creighton (surgeon) (1768–1827), president of the Royal College of Surgeons in Ireland
- John Creighton (priest) (fl. 1643–1670), Chancellor of Christ Church Cathedral and Dean of Ferns

== See also ==
- Creighton (disambiguation)
