= Bishop Creighton =

Bishop Creighton may refer to:

- Frank W. Creighton (1879-1948), American bishop
- Mandell Creighton (1843-1901), English bishop
- Michael W. Creighton (ordained 1969), American bishop
- William Creighton (bishop) (1909-1987), American bishop

== See also ==
- Creighton (name)
