= Crichton =

Crichton may refer to:

== Places ==
=== Scotland ===
- Crichton, Midlothian, Scotland, which is also the site of
  - Crichton Castle
- The Crichton, Dumfries, part of the University of Glasgow and other institutions
- Crichton Royal Hospital, part of Dumfries and Galloway Royal Infirmary
- Crichton F.C., a Dumfries football club

=== Canada ===
- Crichton, Saskatchewan, an unincorporated community in Canada
- Crichton Park, Nova Scotia, a neighbourhood in Dartmouth, Nova Scotia, Canada

=== United States ===
- Crichton, Alabama, a neighborhood of Mobile
- Crichton, Louisiana, an unincorporated community, United States
- Crichton, West Virginia, an unincorporated community, United States
- Crichton College, a Christian liberal arts college in Memphis, Tennessee, United States

== Fiction ==
- Crichton (novel), an 1837 novel by William Harrison Ainsworth
- Robert Crichton (comics)
- John Crichton, a character of the television series Farscape
- Crichton, a robotic character in the television series Buck Rogers in the 25th Century

== Shipbuilding ==
- Wm. Crichton & Co., a Finnish shipbuilding company (1842–1913)
- W. Crichton Shipyard (Okhta), a shipyard in Saint Petersburg, Russia (1897–1913)
- Crichton (Turku shipyard), a Finnish shipbuilding company (1914–1924)
- Crichton-Vulcan, a Finnish shipbuilding company and shipyard (1924–1989)
- J. Crichton & Company, a Welsh shipbuilding company (1913–1935)

== Other uses ==
- Crichton Medal, awarded by the Essendon Football Club
- Crichton Award for Children's Book Illustration

== People with the surname ==
=== Crichton ===
- Clan Crichton
- Lord Crichton
- Alexander Crichton of Brunstane (died c. 1558), Scottish supporter of the Protestant Reformation.
- Sir Alexander Crichton, (1763–1856), Scottish physician and author
- Andrew Crichton, (1790–1855), Scottish biographer and historian
- Angus Crichton (born 1996), Australian footballer
- Charles Crichton (sailor), (1872–1958), British Olympic contestant
- Charles Crichton, (1910–1999), British film director
- David Crichton, (born 1983), professional skier from Canada
- George Crichton (bishop), (died ca. 1544), Bishop of Dunkeld
- Henry Crichton, 6th Earl Erne, (1937-2015), Irish peer
- James Crichton, (1560–1582), Scottish polymath, known as the "Admirable Crichton", after whom Barrie's play (see below) was named
- James Crichton, 1st Viscount Frendraught, (died ca. 1665), Scottish nobleman
- James Crichton (soldier) (1879–1961), Irish/New Zealand winner of the Victoria Cross
- Jesse Crichton, (born 1991), Australian rules footballer
- John Crichton, 3rd Earl Erne, (1802–1885), Anglo-Irish peer and politician
- John Crichton, 4th Earl Erne, (1839–1914), Anglo-Irish peer and politician
- John Crichton, 5th Earl Erne, (1907–1940), Anglo-Irish peer and politician
- Judy Crichton, (1929–2007), documentary film-maker
- Leanne Crichton, (born 1987), Scottish footballer
- Loki Crichton, (born 1976), Samoan rugby player
- Michael Crichton, (1942–2008), American author
- Paul Crichton, (born 1968) English footballer
- Robert Crichton (bishop), (died 1585), Scottish Catholic cleric
- Robert Crichton (novelist), (1925–1993), American author
- Ronald Crichton, (1913–2005), English music critic
- Scott Crichton (judge) (born 1954), member of the Louisiana Supreme Court
- Scott Crichton (American football) (born 1991), American football defensive end
- Scott Crichton (rugby union) (born 1954), New Zealand rugby union player
- Stephen Crichton, Samoan footballer
- Torcuil Crichton (born 1964), Scottish politician
- William Crichton, 1st Lord Crichton (died 1454), Scottish Lord
- William Crichton (engineer), (1827–1889), Scottish engineer and shipbuilder
- Hugh Crichton-Miller, Scottish psychiatrist
- Iain Crichton Smith, Scottish author

=== Crichton-Stuart ===
- Anthony Crichton-Stuart, (born 1961), British art historian
- Augusta Crichton-Stuart, Marchioness of Bute, (1880–1947), British aristocrat
- James Crichton-Stuart (1824–1891), British soldier and politician.
- Lord Colum Crichton-Stuart, (1886–1957) British politician
- John Crichton-Stuart, 2nd Marquess of Bute, (1793–1848)
- John Patrick Crichton-Stuart, 3rd Marquess of Bute, (1847–1900)
- John Crichton-Stuart, 4th Marquess of Bute, (1881–1947)
- John Crichton-Stuart, 5th Marquess of Bute, (1907–1956)
- John Crichton-Stuart, 6th Marquess of Bute, (1933–1993)
- John Crichton-Stuart, 7th Marquess of Bute, (1958–2021)
- Ninian Crichton-Stuart, Keeper of Falkland Palace
- Lord Ninian Crichton-Stuart (1883–1915) British soldier and politician
- Lord Patrick Crichton-Stuart, (1794–1859), British politician
- Rhidian Crichton-Stuart, (1917–1969), British nobleman

== See also ==
- The Admirable Crichton (disambiguation)
- Kryten, a character in Red Dwarf, modelled on the Barrie character
- Creighton (disambiguation)
