= Crighton =

Crighton is a surname. Notable people with the name include:

- Cameron Crighton (born 1992), British actor
- David Crighton (1942–2000), British mathematician and physicist
- Hec Crighton (1900–1967), Canadian football coach
- Michael Crichton or Michael Crighton, (1942–2008), American author, producer, director, and screenwriter

== See also ==
- Craigton (disambiguation)
- Creighton (disambiguation)
- Creightons
- Crichton (disambiguation)
- Croughton (disambiguation)
- The Admirable Crichton
- Kryten
