= Chown (surname) =

Chown is a surname. It may refer to:

== People ==
- Samuel Dwight Chown (1853–1933), Methodist minister instrumental in the formation of the United Church of Canada
- Alice Amelia Chown (1866–1949), Canadian pacifist, social feminist and author
- Bruce Chown (1893–1986), Canadian scientist
- Chris and Gunna Chown, co-owners of the Plas Bodegroes restaurant in Wales
- Gordon Chown, member of Parliament for Winnipeg South, Manitoba, Canada, 1957–1963
- Jeffrey Chown, American professor of communication studies at Northern Illinois University, biographer of director Francis Ford Coppola
- Kevin Chown (born 1969), American musician, bassist for Chad Smith's Bombastic Meatbats and others
- Marcus Chown (born 1959), British science writer and broadcaster
- Nick Chown, bassist for the 1980s English music group The Bolshoi

== Places ==
- Mount Chown, a mountain in Alberta, Canada
- Chown Creek, a tributary of the Smoky River in Western Alberta, Canada
- Mackenzie Chown Complex at Brock University in Ontario, Canada

== Others ==
- chown, a UNIX operating system command

== See also ==
- Chowning
- Chowns
