= William Creighton =

William Creighton may refer to:

- William Creighton Jr. (1778–1851), attorney, banker and legislator in Ohio
- William Black Creighton (1864–1946), Canadian social reformer
- William Steel Creighton (1902–1973), American myrmecologist and taxonomist
- William Creighton (bishop) (1909–1987), bishop of the Diocese of Washington
- William Creighton (rally driver) (born 1997), Irish rally driver
