= Chowning =

Surname

Chowning is a surname. It may refer to:

== People ==
- Ann Chowning (1929–2016) — American anthropologist in West New Britain and other areas of the Pacific
- James Chowning Davies (born 1918) — American sociologist
- John Chowning (born 1934) — American inventor and musician
- Randall Chowning, — American musician, member of the band Ozark Mountain Daredevils
- Trevor Chowning — American pop artist and former talent manager
- Wayne A. Chowning, — first mayor of DeSoto, Texas in the United States
- Josiah Chowning — Proprietor of Chowning's Tavern in colonial America

== Places ==
- Chowning Cemetery in Fairbanks Township, Sullivan County, Indiana in the United States

== See also ==
- Chown (surname)
