= Creighton, Ontario =

Creighton may refer to:

- Creighton, Simcoe County, Ontario, a township
- Creighton Mine, Ontario or Creighton, a ghost town

== See also ==
- Creighton (disambiguation)
