= Lydia Elizabeth Hall =

Canadian Methodist evangelist

- Born: 1864; Eramosa Township, Upper Canada
- Died: 15 May 1916 (aged 51–52); Guelph, Ontario, Canada
- Other names: Eliza Hall, Lyda Hall
- Occupation: Evangelist

Lydia Elizabeth Hall (or Lyda Hall; 1864 – 15 May 1916) was a Canadian Methodist evangelist.

== Early years ==
Lydia Elizabeth Hall was born in Eramosa Township, Upper Canada in 1864. She was the second of the three daughters of Joseph Hall and Ann Duggan, a Methodist family. Her father died sometime before 1871, and her mother married George Wrigglesworth en Rollingstones, a widowed farmer in Halton County. The family moved to Georgetown after Wrigglesworth retired from farming, where Lydia and her older sister Margaret made ladies hats. Around 1883 the family moved to Guelph.

In April 1885 Hall attended evangelistic services conducted by David Savage in the Norfolk Street Methodist Church in Guelph, where Savage was accompanied by a "praying band" of twelve young men whom he had trained and supervised. Within a year Hall had joined one of Savage's bands. In the fall of 1886 she and a male evangelist accompanied Savage on the trip to Quebec's Eastern Townships. In 1887 Savage paired up Hall and Sadie Williams of Tottenham as a team to assist congregations that asked for help. Hall and Williams, both from farming backgrounds, worked together in Marsville, Ontario in the fall of 1887. At the time Hall was aged about twenty-two and Williams about twenty-six. Shortly after this Williams began to work alone, both preaching and leading the song service, and Hall was joined by her younger sister Annie Hall.

== Evangelist ==
The Hall sisters began touring Methodist churches in southern Ontario, where they typically held nightly revival services for a two-week period, sometimes for as long as a month. Often the services began with song. The Christian Guardian compared their songs to "eloquent sermons". Lyda was the stronger preacher, while her sister had a talent for persuading members of the congregation to stay after the service for the inquiry meeting that followed. In these meetings the sisters tried to lead the seekers to salvation with "exemplary tact and sanctified common sense ... equal to any emergency". In the spring of 1895 they were invited to conduct services in Guelph. As their reputation grew the Hall sisters were asked to travel further to visit larger churches in Hamilton, Toronto and the United States. Most but not all of the churches were Methodist.

By the end of 1900 the Hall sisters had featured in reports by the Christian Guardian of more than fifty revivals. The actual number they had led was probably much greater. Lyda and Annie Hall were not ordained as ministers, since that was not the practice of the Methodist church, but depended on invitations from male ministers who asked for their help. They did not have a set fee, but would receive a "thank offering" from the congregation after each service. They had a home in Guelph, shared with their mother, who died in 1902 and their stepfather, who died in 1898. In the summer of 1907 Lyda became paralysed. She lived as an invalid until 15 May 1916 when she died of heart disease in Guelph, Ontario.

== Sources ==
- Muir, Elizabeth Gillan; Whiteley, Marilyn Färdig (1995). Changing Roles of Women Within the Christian Church in Canada. University of Toronto Press. ISBN 978-0-8020-7623-6.
- Whiteley, Marilyn Färdig (1998). Dictionary of Canadian Biography. Vol. 14. University of Toronto/Université Laval.
