= Adam Creighton =

Adam Creighton may refer to:

- Adam Creighton (ice hockey)
- Adam Creighton (journalist)
