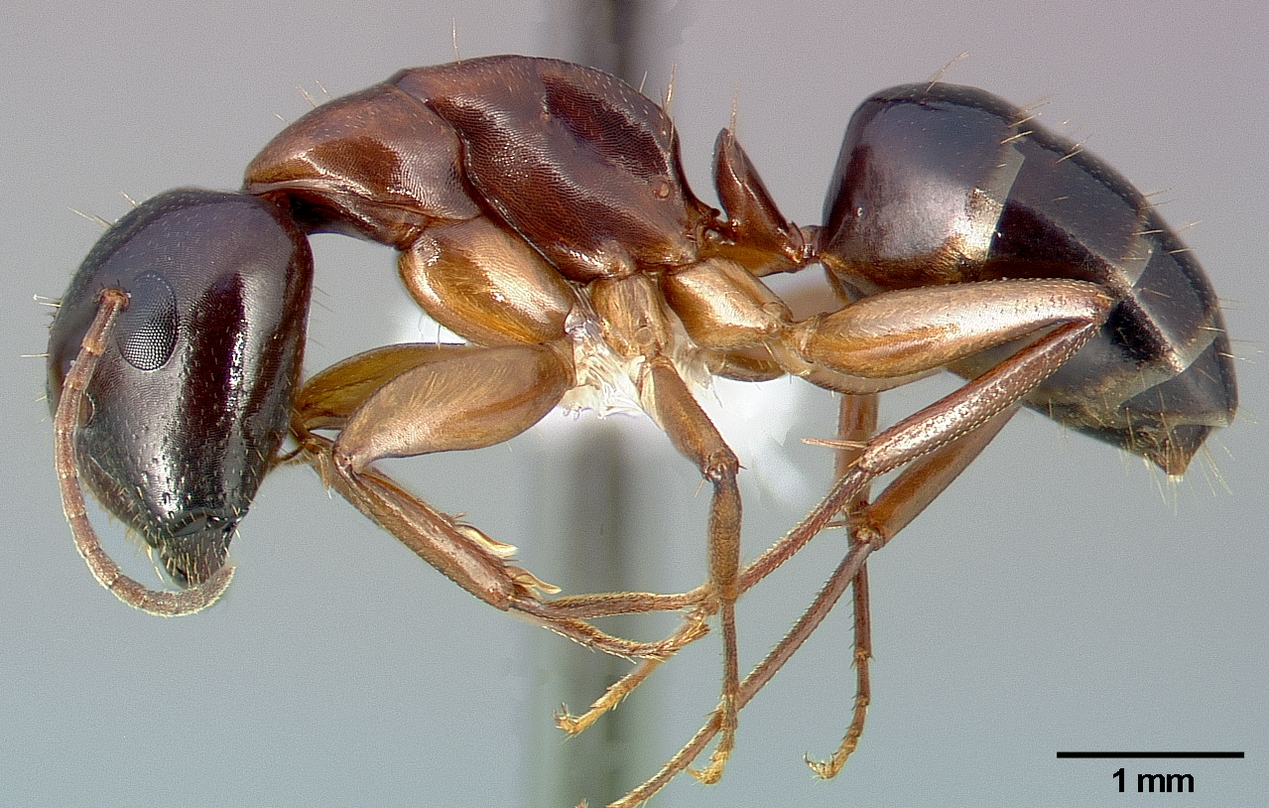

Scientific classification
- Domain: Eukaryota
- Kingdom: Animalia
- Phylum: Arthropoda
- Class: Insecta
- Order: Hymenoptera
- Family: Formicidae
- Subfamily: Formicinae
- Genus: Camponotus
- Subgenus: Camponotus
- Species: C. clarithorax

Binomial name
- Camponotus clarithorax Creighton, 1950

= Camponotus clarithorax =

Species of ant

Camponotus clarithorax is a species of carpenter ant of the subgenus Camponotus native to California, Oregon, the Baja California Peninsula, and possibly the eastern United States.
