= The Christian Guardian =

Canadian Methodist periodical

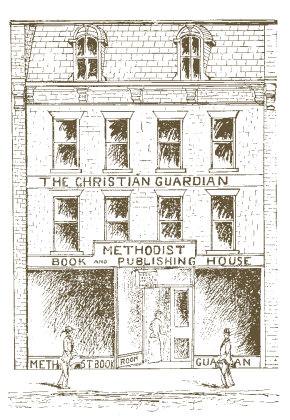
- Methodist Book and Publishing House offices, 78 King St. East, Toronto c. 1838
- Publisher: Methodist Book and Publishing House
- Founder: Egerton Ryerson
- First issue: 21 November 1829
- Final issue: 10 June 1925
- Country: Canada
- Based in: Toronto
- Language: English

The Christian Guardian was a Wesleyan Methodist journal founded in Upper Canada in 1829. The first editor was Egerton Ryerson. It ceased publication in 1925 when the Methodist Church of Canada merged with the Presbyterians and Congregationalists to form the United Church of Canada, and merged their journals to create The New Outlook, later renamed the United Church Observer.

== History ==
The Canadian Wesleyan Methodists founded the Christian Guardian as their weekly newspaper on 21 November 1829 with Egerton Ryerson (1803–1882) as editor. The Guardian was the first religious newspaper published in Canada. In the first issue Ryerson wrote: "we consider it our duty and feel it to be our vocation to devote our limited researches, talents and influence, to the high and holy interests of morality and religion – to the spiritual welfare of immortal and redeemed men." However, he was not able to stay out of politics, and soon became engaged with the Anglican John Strachan in a lively debate over the future of society in Upper Canada.

Ryerson was called a "doughty controversialist who, by his facile pen, fought the battle of civil and religious liberty." His passionate views caused him to be voted out of office three times. He was editor from 1829 to 1832, 1833 to 1835 and 1838 to 1840. With minimal resources, he managed to build up the circulation to 3,000 within three years. Other editors before Canadian Confederation (1867) were James Richardson, Ephraim Evans, Jonathan Scott, George Frederick Playter, George R. Sanderson, James Spencer and Wellington Jeffers. Jeffers was editor of the Christian Guardian from 1860 to 1866. He invited Nathanael Burwash to write a number of guest editorials during this period.

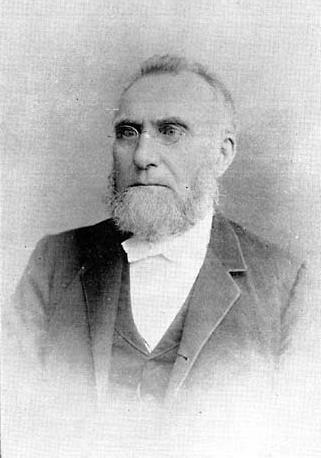
Edward Hartley Dewart (1828-1903), editor for many years

Edward Hartley Dewart (1828-1903) was named editor of the Christian Guardian in 1869. He wrote incisively and with conviction, and was one of the driving forces in bringing about a union of Methodist churches to reduce the wastage of duplicate services. In 1874 the Methodist New Connexion Society was consolidated with the Wesleyan Methodist Society to form the Methodist Church of Canada. The New Connection paper The Evangelical Witness was merged with The Christian Guardian. David Savage, editor of The Evangelical Witness, continued as associate editor of the merged paper for some time.

Dewart supported the further Methodist union in the 1880s. The Canada Christian Advocate, the organ of the Methodist Episcopal Church, was merged into The Christian Guardian in 1884, as were The Christian Journal, the organ of the Primitive Methodist Church, and The Observer, the organ of the Bible Christian Church. Dewart advocated federation of Victoria College with the University of Toronto. During his long editorship the Christian Guardian became increasingly a mouthpiece for Dewart's orthodox opinions, out of touch with the more liberal views of the church. He was forced out of office by the General Conference of 1894.

William Black Creighton, a Methodist minister from rural Ontario, became assistant editor of The Christian Guardian in 1900 after laryngitis forced him to stop preaching. From 1906 to 1925 Creighton was editor of the paper, where he developed his views as a progressive supporter of the Social Gospel. (Note: Creighton had married his cousin Laura Harvie, daughter of the social reformer Lizzie J. Creighton, the founder of the Toronto Young Women's Christian Guild. He was father of the prominent historian Donald Grant Creighton (1902–1979).) During World War I (1914–18) the Guardian gave strong backing to the Canadian war effort, the Union government led by Prime Minister Sir Robert Laird Borden, and conscription. Creighton wrote in an editorial in August 1914: "We are British! and we will stand by the mother land in this greatest campaign of all time."

In 1925 the Canadian Methodists, Congregationalists and most Presbyterians merged into The United Church of Canada. The newspapers of the three denominations were merged to become The New Outlook. It was first published on 10 June 1925, the day of the founding services of The United Church of Canada. W. B. Creighton continued as editor of The New Outlook. The newspaper was renamed The United Church Observer in 1939. Based on its origins in the Christian Guardian, the Observer describes itself as the oldest continuously published magazine in North America.

== Views ==
=== Politics ===
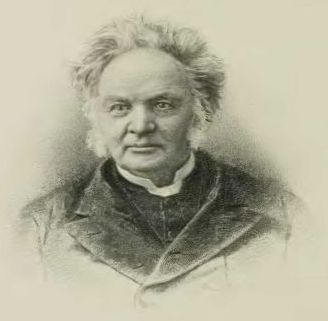
Egerton Ryerson, the first editor

Ryerson was suspicious of political radicals. This view was reinforced when he visited England in 1833 and found that the radicals, whose leader was Joseph Hume, were irreligious republicans. He wrote, "Radicalism in England appeared to us to be another word for Republicanism, with the name of King instead of President ... And perhaps one of the most formidable obstacles to a wise, safe and effectual reform of political, ecclesiastical and religious abuses in England, is, the notorious want of religious virtue or integrity in many of the leading politicians who have lamentably succeeded in getting their names identified with reform ..." Ryerson considered that Canadian radicals were disloyal due to their close links to the radicals in England.

The newspaper took a relatively conservative, uncontroversial position in politics, and was called by Lord Sydenham "the only decent paper in both Canadas". It was strongly opposed to the special position given to the Church of England in Upper Canada, and had great influence among nonconformists. The paper defended religious freedom, democracy and education. During the election of 1836 Ephraim Evans, editor of the Christian Guardian, gave complete support to the government led by Sir Francis Bond Head. He encouraged voters to declare "for the continuation of that unrivalled national blessing, the British constitution".

=== Revivalism ===
As the official voice of Methodism in Upper Canada, the Guardian presented a view in sharp contrast to the calm rationalism of the Church of England. It stated, "True religion does not consist in orthodox opinions, in the purest forms of divine worship, in correct moral conduct, or even in the combination of these things. 'The Kingdom of God is not in word, but in power.' However the Gospel may be admired, its great design is never realized but in the actual conversion and salvation of men. With whatever ability the word of life may be dispensed no sinner will be truly awakened, no heart will become broken and contrite, no polluted conscience will be purged from dead works, no impure mind will be sanctified, no human soul will be effectively renewed and comforted, unless the Holy Spirit descend in the plenitude of his love and power."

By the 1850 the newspaper was taking a position against the excesses of the early Canadian revivalists. It asked how often people had "been disgusted by the singularity and eccentricity of the preacher". It criticized preachers "who commence an out-pouring of vituperation against [the people] saying hard things of their supposed errors, and charging them with vice and wickedness." Instead the paper asked preachers to present a pleasing appearance, speak with refined manners and be sensitive to their audience. The congregation should also be decorous, and in particular should not constantly shout "Amen!". They should not use the word "with insincerity, rashness and irreverence, but reverently, appropriately, and earnestly. It is a devotional act and should be characterized by spirituality and solemnity; yet with humble confidence of importunity."

=== Original sin ===
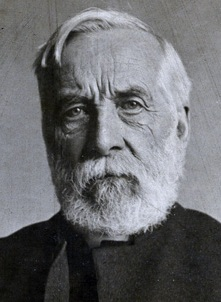
Nathanael Burwash, whose views on original sin caused lively debate among readers

In 1864 The Christian Guardian published the views of Freeborn Garretson Hibbard, a Methodist Episcopal minister in the Genesee Conference, and the similar views of Robert Olin, another American Methodist. They argued that as a result of Christ's death a child was born in a state of innocence. The main concern of the church was therefore Christian nurture to maintain the children in this condition rather than to convert them. The editor of the Guardian said, "Unless childhood is nurtured and trained, with the utmost solicitude and by all available means, the religion of Christ can never become universal, or permanently deep, fruitful, and progressive."

In 1881 an essay on this subject by Nathanael Burwash on "The Moral Condition of Childhood" was published in the paper, causing a lively correspondence. According to Burwash, Methodist Arminian theology implied that the child should be taught "conscious repentance, faith, and the new birth of the spirit" from the moment the child showed the effects of original sin with "the first pang of conscience arising from the first awakening of inborn sin." An angry correspondent wrote that in this theology "irresponsible infants are little more than germs of depravity, destined to blossom into sinners at the very outset of their conscious moral life. They are sinful and capable only of sin." Henry Flesher Bland said of Burwash's view, "A somewhat poor lookout for those who die in infancy, idiocy, and heathenism, none of whom can experience the new birth in the way conditioned by the Essayist."

=== Church ornamentation ===
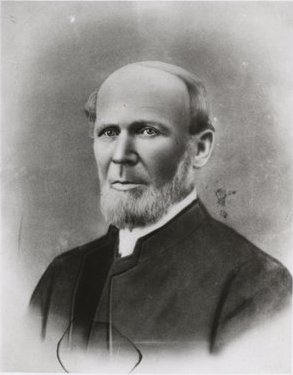
Wellington Jeffers (1814–1896), editor just before Confederation

By the 1870s the Christian Guardian was starting to question the Protestant tradition of avoiding church decoration, which was associated with Roman Catholicism. The paper now said that decoration enhanced worship, and congregations should build more fitting and beautiful churches. This changed aesthetic was reflected in the Metropolitan Methodist Church that was opened in 1872, a large Gothic-style building.

=== Health and science ===
The doctor Anna Henry gave many examples in The Christian Guardian that supported her theory that surgery and medicine simply prepared the sick for true healing through the Word. Patients must learn "that in order to serve the true God aright and know what He would have them do, they must read His book." In 1901 The Christian Guardian told of a famous doctor who told an anxious female patient to read the Bible, rather than giving her drugs. After this succeeded, he told her "with deep earnestness, 'If I were to omit my daily reading of this book, I should lose my greatest source of strength and skill. I never go to an operation without reading my Bible. I never attend a distressing case without finding help in its pages. Your case called, not for medicine, but for sources of peace and strength outside your own mind, and I showed you my own prescription and I knew it would cure'". The Christian Guardian recognized the potential healing power of faith (or suggestion) but acknowledged advances in medical science and did not endorse the "mental healing" of Pentecostalism and Christian Science.

The Christian Guardian presented itself as educational, as did the Anglican Canadian Churchman. Christians were expected to be virtuous and healthy, and in the early 20th century both papers often described medical advances, warned against patent medicine and faith healing, raised the alarm over the spread of disease with articles like "Moslem Menace" and discussed the cleansing power of the Gospel. The Guardian published a letter from R.D. Hare in which he wrote that the virtues of "pure citizenship" had to be taught to adolescent boys, so they could face a "carnival of nastiness, a miasma of unclean and malign influences, which attenuate the mind, pollute the imagination, and disintegrate the soul—all because they atrophy and paralyze the will." Hare said that through honest sexual education a youth could have "his conception of his bodily powers changed from the vulgar to the holy, by sympathetic, scientific instruction, [such that] his craving for the unnatural could be brought under his will."

In 1911 the feminist Alice Chown, cousin of the Methodist leader Samuel Dwight Chown, investigated the training of Methodist deaconesses. (Note: A deaconess was a cross between a nurse, social worker and missionary. Chown wrote that "the skilled nurse who saves one baby from blindness is worth more than twenty deaconesses with their pious platitudes of indignation." Eventually the public came to accept her view.) The Christian Guardian was persuaded to publish the resulting derisive report, probably because of her family name. Chown surmised that the real object of the training was, "to furnish nice little satellites for Methodist ministers, women who will clasp their hands in admiration at the greater knowledge of the pastor... It seemed to me that the course of study was aptly framed to fill Ruskin's ideal education of women, the ability to appreciate other people's learning, not to be competent oneself." The article caused a strong reaction from other readers of the paper. The Reverend Bartle Bull said deaconesses did not need "abstract sociological theories."

The newspaper got involved in controversy when it reported the investigations into spiritualist phenomena of Sir Oliver Lodge of the Society for Psychical Research. A cautious editorial, impressed by Lodge's scientific credentials, praised his investigations into telepathy, automatic writing and the "Christian belief in man's survival of bodily death." It concluded, "At least, it is a source of satisfaction to know that this whole question of spirit communications is not to be left in the hands of charlatans, but that men of the scientific temperament and undoubted honesty are giving careful and painstaking attention to it." The editorial caused a storm of indignant letters that attacked Lodge as "Christless and Godless", while other readers defended Lodge. The editors dodged the issue, saying that it was completely wrong to interpret the editorial as supporting spiritualism over science.

In 1924–25 The Christian Guardian and The Canadian Churchman both published a series of more than fifty articles sponsored by the Canadian Medical Association. They discussed specific diseases, industrial accidents, nutrition, preventative medicine, healthy holidaying and environmental dangers. They included profiles of well-known doctors. These article clearly demonstrated the commitment of Protestants to scientific medicine.

== Sources ==
- Creighton, Philip (2005). "CREIGHTON, ELIZA JANE (Harvie)". Dictionary of Canadian Biography. Vol. 15. University of Toronto/Université Laval.
- Gardiola, Christal (Spring 2009). "The Mission". Ryerson Review of Journalism. Ryerson University. Archived from the original on 2011-07-06.
- Holman, Andrew C. (2000). A Sense of Their Duty: Middle-Class Formation in Victorian Ontario Towns. McGill-Queen's Press - MQUP. ISBN 978-0-7735-2083-7.
- Hopkins, J. Castell (1898). "A Review of Canadian Journalism". An historical sketch of Canadian literature and journalism]. Toronto: Linscott.
- Klassen, Pamela E. (2011-07-14). Spirits of Protestantism: Medicine, Healing, and Liberal Christianity. University of California Press. ISBN 978-0-520-95044-3.
- Marshall, David B. (1994-01-01). "Dewart, Edward Hartley". Dictionary of Canadian Biography. Springer Science & Business Media. ISBN 978-0-8020-3998-9.
- Mills, David (1988-10-01). Idea of Loyalty in Upper Canada, 1784-1850. McGill-Queen's Press - MQUP. ISBN 978-0-7735-6174-8.
- Russell, Ken (2005). "About The Observer". United Church Observer.
- Valverde, Mariana (2008). The Age of Light, Soap, and Water: Moral Reform in English Canada, 1885–1925. University of Toronto Press. ISBN 978-0-8020-9595-4.
- Van Die, Marguerite (1989-08-01). Evangelical Mind: Nathanael Burwash and the Methodist Tradition in Canada, 1839-1918. McGill-Queen's Press - MQUP. ISBN 978-0-7735-0695-4.
- Westfall, William (1990-09-01). Two Worlds: The Protestant Culture of Nineteenth Century Ontario. McGill-Queen's Press - MQUP. ISBN 978-0-7735-0797-5.
- Withrow, W. H. (1891). "Methodist Literature and Methodist Sunday-schools". Centennial of Canadian Methodism.
- Wright, Donald (2013). "CREIGHTON, DONALD GRANT". Dictionary of Canadian Biography. Vol. XX (1971-1980). University of Toronto/Université Laval.
