= David Savage =

- Born: 1830; London, England
- Died: 1893 (aged 62–63)
- Occupation: Methodist minister
- Known for: Evangelistic "band"s

David Savage (1830–1893) was an English-born Methodist minister who worked as a pastor and evangelist in Upper Canada for many years. In the 1880s he adapted techniques from the Salvation Army and began to recruit and train bands of young men or women to assist in his evangelical services. Often they went on to become evangelists themselves.

== Life ==
David Savage was born in London, England in 1830. His family was Congregationalist. He came with his family to Montreal in 1841. He converted to Methodism. He was received on trial at Welland Canal in 1850. He entered the Methodist New Connexion ministry in 1851. Savage's charges were Toronto (1852), London (1853–54), Toronto (1855), Hamilton (1856–57), Toronto (1858), Cavan (1859–60), Aurora (1861–63), Nassagaweya / Ellis Church, Puslinch, Wellington County (1864–1866), London (1867–69), St. John's, Toronto (1870–71), London (1872–75), Toronto (1880) and London (1881). He was president of the Conference in 1862 and 1874, and District chairman 1868–69.

The Evangelical Witness, the organ of the Methodist New Connexion Church, was founded in 1865 by J. H. Robinson as a monthly paper. Robinson was the English representative of the Methodist New Connexion and its Missionary Superintendent. Soon after the paper became semi-monthly, then weekly. Robinson was succeeded as editor and Superintendent of Missions by William Cocker, who held office until he returned to England in 1872. Savage was the third and last editor of the paper, taking office in 1872.

In 1874 the New Connexion Methodist Society was consolidated with the Wesleyan Methodist Society to form the Methodist Church of Canada. The Evangelical Witness was merged with The Christian Guardian. Savage continued as associate editor of the merged paper for some time. Savage and Egerton Ryerson were Canadian representatives at the 1876 Methodist Conference in England. In June 1876 the New Connexion building in Galt was officially made part of the Methodist Church of Canada. Soon after Savage was appointed the new minister in Galt. The congregation objected, and formed a Congregationist church in Galt.

In 1885 Savage retired from regular circuit work. For the next eight years until his death he devoted himself to revival services across Canada. He was strongly evangelistic throughout his career, and was an extremely successful field preacher. David Savage died in 1893. His obituary said he had advanced the doctrine of holiness "as taught by the Methodist Church, without any fantastic of extravagant additions."

== Evangelistic bands ==
David Savage was among the Methodists who were uncomfortable with the somewhat sensational methods used in recruitment by The Salvation Army, but were also uncomfortable with the fact that the Army was being successful in making converts where the Methodists had failed. While serving as a minister in Petrolia, Savage organised bands of young Methodist men or women and brought them to help at revivals. They were seen as legitimate, since they were led by a minister, and they were themselves learning to become evangelists. Savage had an energy and skill as an organiser that made his bands models for the others.

Sometimes Savage would come to a revival with a band, and sometimes he would send them out under a "second in command." As his members gained experience, he was able to send "companies of two to four ... where a local 'band' is available to support the more experienced workers." In this way, membership of the bands expanded. In 1887 The Christian Guardian published a notice saying "Rev. David Savage writes that several young ladies qualified for evangelistic work, and for whom he can vouch both as to gifts and grace, will be available for work in Ontario about the end of August. Applications for their services made to him will receive due attention."

Lydia Elizabeth Hall, later a well-known evangelist in her own right, became dedicated to the religious life after attending evangelistic services led by Savage in April 1885 at the Norfolk Street Methodist Church in Guelph. Savage brought twelve young men with him to these services whom he had recruited at earlier revivals and then trained and supervised. In the fall of 1886, when Savage started to use smaller teams, he took Hall and a male evangelist as assistants on a visit to the Eastern Townships of Quebec. Hall and her younger sister Annie soon began to lead revival meetings on their own. When Samuel Dwight Chown, future leader of the Canadian Methodist church, was pastor in Sydenham he was helped by a band organised by Savage. More than 200 people came to the inquiry room of the Methodist church there, and he thought 150 were "soundly converted."

== Sources ==
- Airhart, Phyllis D. (26 February 1992). Serving the Present Age: Revivalism, Progressivism, and the Methodist Tradition in Canada. McGill-Queen's Press – MQUP. ISBN 978-0-7735-6319-3.
- Holman, Andrew C. (2000). A Sense of Their Duty: Middle-Class Formation in Victorian Ontario Towns. McGill-Queen's Press – MQUP. ISBN 978-0-7735-2083-7.
- Muir, Elizabeth Gillan; Whiteley, Marilyn Färdig (1995). Changing Roles of Women Within the Christian Church in Canada. University of Toronto Press. ISBN 978-0-8020-7623-6.
- Russell, Ken (2005). "Canadian Methodist Ministers 1800–1925". Canadian Methodist Historical Society.
- Semple, Neil (1996). The Lord's Dominion: The History of Canadian Methodism. McGill-Queen's Press – MQUP. ISBN 978-0-7735-1400-3.
- Stevenson, George John (1884). Methodist Worthies: Characteristic Sketches of Methodist Preachers of the Several Denominations, with Historical Sketch of Each Connexion. T.C. Jack. p. 63.
- Whiteley, Marilyn Färdig (1998). "HALL, LYDIA ELIZABETH". Dictionary of Canadian Biography. Vol. 14. University of Toronto/Université Laval.
- Whiteley, Marilyn Färdig (28 April 2005). Canadian Methodist Women, 1766–1925: Marys, Marthas, Mothers in Israel. Wilfrid Laurier Univ. Press. ISBN 978-0-88920-480-5.
- Withrow, W. H. (1891). "Methodist Literature and Methodist Sunday-schools". Centennial of Canadian Methodism.
