= Michael Creighton =

Michael Creighton may refer to:

- Michael Cyril Creighton, American actor and writer
- Michael W. Creighton, bishop of the Episcopal Diocese of Central Pennsylvania

== See also ==
- Michael Crichton (1942–2008), American author and filmmaker
