= Creighton =

Creighton may refer to:

== Places ==
=== Canada ===
- Creighton, Saskatchewan
- Creighton, Simcoe County, Ontario
- Creighton Mine, a mine in Greater Sudbury, Ontario
- Creighton Mine, Ontario

=== South Africa ===
- Creighton, KwaZulu-Natal

=== United States ===
- Creighton, Florida
- Creighton, Missouri
- Creighton, Nebraska
- Creighton, Pennsylvania
- Creighton, South Dakota
- Creighton Township, Knox County, Nebraska

== Education ==
- Creighton Preparatory School, Omaha, Nebraska
- Creighton University, Omaha, Nebraska
- Fortismere School, north London, England, formed from Creighton School and Alexandra Park School

== Other uses ==
- Creighton (name), a given name and surname
- Creighton Bluejays, the athletic program of Creighton University
- Creightons, a British manufacturer of consumer goods
- 10046 Creighton, a carbonaceous background asteroid
- Mount Creighton, Antarctica

== See also ==
- Crichton (disambiguation)
- Crighton, a surname
