= Alice Amelia Chown =

Canadian feminist, pacifist, socialist and author (1866–1949)

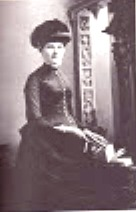
- Alice Amelia Chown from the frontispiece of her book The Stairway (1921)
- Born: 3 February 1866; Kingston, Canada West
- Died: 2 March 1949 (aged 83); Toronto, Ontario, Canada
- Occupations: Feminist, pacifist, socialist and author
- Known for: The Stairway (1921)

Alice Amelia Chown (3 February 1866 – 2 March 1949) was a Canadian feminist, pacifist, socialist and author. She was brought up in a strict Methodist family, and remained at home until she was forty attending her mother, who died in 1906. Chown then embarked on a life of travel and involvement in many reform causes. She was an original and iconoclastic thinker, and became one of the leading social feminists of her day. She is best known for her 1921 book The Stairway in which she recounts her life and growing freedom after 1906.

== Early years ==
Alice Amelia Chown was born in Kingston, Province of Canada on 3 February 1866 to merchant Edwin Chown (1821-1903) and Amelia Anning (1828-1906). Her family was Methodist. Her relatives included doctors, lawyers and senior clergymen such as S.D. Chown, her uncle. She had six brothers in her well-to-do family. Her mother, Amelia, insisted that Alice received an equal education to her brothers. In 1887 Alice began to study political science and economics at Queen's University, but left in 1894 before completing the degree. Her political science teacher, professor Shortt, tried to convince her that socialism was dangerous.

Alice was inspired by the Social Gospel ideology espoused at Queen's University and soon became committed to the women's suffrage movement. While taking care of her ailing mother, Alice developed ties with American social reformers of the time, visiting Hull House in 1893 and eventually spending a year in 1898 at Whittier House to learn about the social settlements in the country.

In 1899 Chown was secretary of the Kingston Charity Organization Society, which believed in scientific philanthropy, and spoke on this subject at the National Council of Women of Canada annual meeting. Her speech was printed as an article in the Methodist Christian Guardian. She stayed at home until she was forty, when her profoundly religious mother died in 1906. After this she started to travel and work on social reforms. Her decision to take advantage of her freedom at this age was somewhat alarming to the conservative middle-class society of Kingston.

== Pre-war activities ==
Chown supported women's trade unions, women's suffrage and the League of Nations. In 1910 she took her niece Edith Georgina Chown, whose father had just died, on a visit to England, Belgium and France. In London they saw the funeral of King Edward VII, visited Dr Barnado's Homes, listened to the feminist Christabel Pankhurst and represented Canada in a suffragist demonstration. A brilliant and controversial iconoclast overflowing with ideas, Alice Chown became the best known of the first wave of social feminists in Canada. She was an admirer of the views of Edward Carpenter on love and sex. She rejected the constraining clothes of the period, and adopted loose tunics and bare feet. She tried, without success, to introduce the theories of Sigmund Freud to the middle-class supporters of the suffrage movement in Toronto.

Chown became field secretary of the Canadian Household Economic Association. Chown believed that women played a valuable role in the home, but disliked the idea of "separate spheres" because that would cause women to be judged only as homemakers. She wanted women to have a broader education so they could develop all of their intellectual talents. She agreed that the domestic science schools that Adelaide Hoodless of the Women's Institutes wanted to institute in rural Ontario would have value, but was concerned that with their narrow curriculum women would become ghettoized.

In 1911 Chown investigated the training of Methodist deaconesses, (Note: A deaconess was a cross between a nurse, social worker and missionary. Chown wrote that "the skilled nurse who saves one baby from blindness is worth more than twenty deaconesses with their pious platitudes of indignation." Eventually the public came to accept her view.) and The Christian Guardian was persuaded to publish the resulting derisive report. She surmised that the real object of the training was, "to furnish nice little satellites for Methodist ministers, women who will clasp their hands in admiration at the greater knowledge of the pastor... It seemed to me that the course of study was aptly framed to fill Ruskin's ideal education of women, the ability to appreciate other people's learning, not to be competent oneself." The article caused a strong reaction from other readers of the paper. The Reverend Bartle Bull said deaconesses did not need "abstract sociological theories." Chown wrote other articles along the same lines. She was in contact with the Hull House in Chicago, and like its founders wanted to improve working class conditions. Her main criticism of the Deaconess society was that it failed to address the underlying causes of poverty.

In 1912 Chown helped organize support for strikers at Eaton's department store in Toronto. She saw the picketers being mishandled, joined them and was herself pushed into a police wagon. The strikers asked Chown to use her position in society to persuade the Toronto papers to discuss the strike, which they were reluctant to do for fear of losing advertising revenue. Chown had some difficulty getting overt support for the strike from the Toronto Women's Suffrage Society, who did not want to be damaged by association with an unpopular cause. The unpopularity of the strike among Chown's acquaintances was partly because the great majority of the strikers were Jewish. Canadian feminists, like many others in Canada, disliked these recent immigrants. Chown was a founding member of the Toronto Equal Franchise League in 1912.

== Later career ==
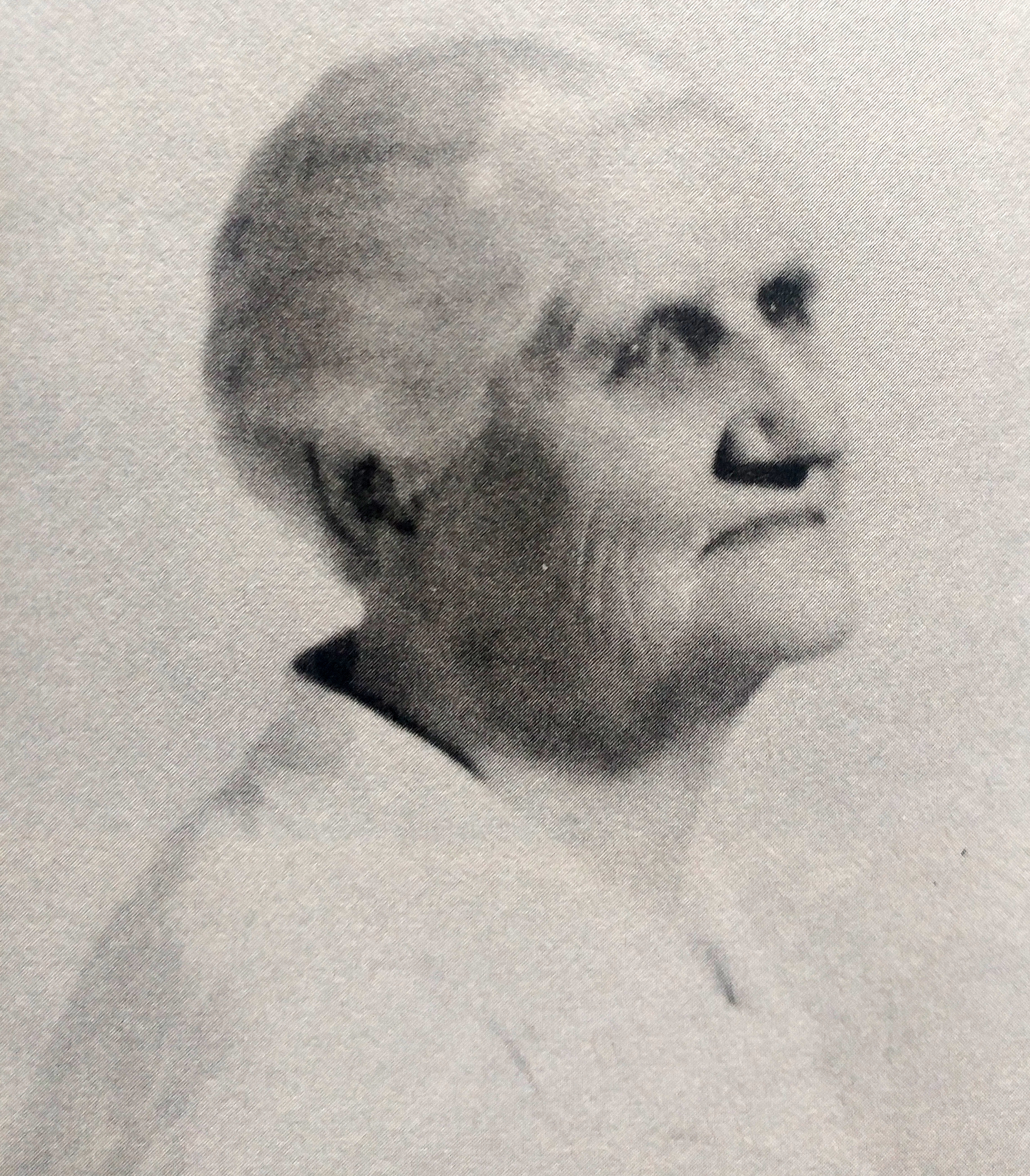
Alice Chown in her later years. Photo taken in the 1940s. From the 1989 re-issue of The Staircase.

Chown was a committed pacifist during World War I (1914–18). Chown said that non-resistance "is only possible to men and women whose faith in this being a spiritual universe is strong." She thought that pacifists "have glimpsed the coming world ideal."

At the Women's International Conference at The Hague in 1915, Chown "contributed to the merging of pacifist and suffragette ideas in a program denouncing militarism, autocracy, secret treaties, and imperialism while calling for a new international order based on compulsory arbitrarion, universal disarmament, freedom of the seas, and a league of democratic nations." In the same year, she was a co-founder with Laura Hughes and Elsie Charlton of the Canadian Women's Peace Party. Her outspoken views were to bring her notoriety. She was hostile to the church, and as a pacifist was critical of the attitude of her cousin Samuel Dwight Chown, a Methodist minister and army chaplain during the war.

Chown's pacifism caused conflict with other Canadian feminist leaders. In 1917 she moved to the United States, where she taught at a trade union college for the next ten years. Later she traveled in Europe and Russia. Chown founded the Women's League of Nations Association in 1930, dedicated to education in pacifism. She organized teas at which Jews and gentiles could meet. She wrote a column for the United Church Observer. In 1945 she was elected honorary president of Toronto's United Nations Society.

Alice Amelia Chown died in Toronto on 2 March 1949. Despite being unconventional, in some ways Chown was a typical late Victorian social reformer. Contrasting her views to those of her mother, she wrote, "Her faith was in a Supreme Being who existed perfect, complete; mine in a life force, present in every man, which must grow and develop."

== Writings ==
Chown published her journal The Stairway in 1921, based on her diaries between 1906 and 1920, which tells of her experiences in terms of a series of steps leading to ever greater freedom. The book gives her opinions on many subjects including the settlement and co-operative movements, trade unionism, female suffrage, dress reform and sexual freedom. She wrote on the rights on women to higher education, education in home economics, urban improvement, universal brotherhood and world peace.

== See also ==
- List of peace activists

== Sources ==
- Allen, Richard (2008). The View from Murney Tower: Salem Bland, the Late Victorian Controversies, and the Search for a New Christianity. University of Toronto Press. ISBN 978-0-8020-9748-4.
- Arthur, Chris (2012-10-13). Financial Literacy Education: Neoliberalism, the Consumer and the Citizen. Springer Science & Business Media. ISBN 978-94-6091-918-3.
- Campbell, Peter (2010-11-02). Rose Henderson: A Woman for the People. McGill-Queen's Press - MQUP. ISBN 978-0-7735-3764-4.
- Campbell, Sandra (2013-05-01). Both Hands: A Life of Lorne Pierce of Ryerson Press. MQUP. ISBN 978-0-7735-8864-6.
- Chown, Diana (2008-03-24). "Alice Amelia Chown". The Canadian Encyclopedia.
- Cook, Ramsay (1985-01-01). The Regenerators: Social Criticism in Late Victorian English Canada. University of Toronto Press. p. 232. ISBN 978-0-8020-6609-1.
- Dagg, Anne Innis (2006-01-01). The Feminine Gaze: A Canadian Compendium of Non-Fiction Women Authors and Their Books, 1836–1945. Wilfrid Laurier Univ. Press. ISBN 978-0-88920-845-2.
- Hoerder, Dirk (2000-01-01). Creating Societies: Immigrant Lives in Canada. McGill-Queen's Press - MQUP. ISBN 978-0-7735-6798-6.
- Josephson, Harold (1985). Biographical Dictionary of Modern Peace Leaders. Connecticut: Greenwood. pp. 145-146. ISBN 0-313-22565-6.
- Kechnie, Margaret (2004). Organizing Rural Women: The Federated Women's Institutes of Ontario, 1897-1919. McGill-Queen's Press - MQUP. ISBN 978-0-7735-2604-4.
- Klassen, Pamela E. (2011-07-14). Spirits of Protestantism: Medicine, Healing, and Liberal Christianity. University of California Press. ISBN 978-0-520-95044-3.
- Steedman, Mercedes (1997). Angels of the Workplace: Women and the Construction of Gender Relations in the Canadian Clothing Industry, 1890-1940. University of Toronto Press. ISBN 978-0-19-541308-3.
- Valverde, Mariana (2008). The Age of Light, Soap, and Water: Moral Reform in English Canada, 1885–1925. University of Toronto Press. ISBN 978-0-8020-9595-4.
