= Angus Dun =

American bishop (1892–1971)

The Right Reverend Angus Dun
- Bishop of Washington
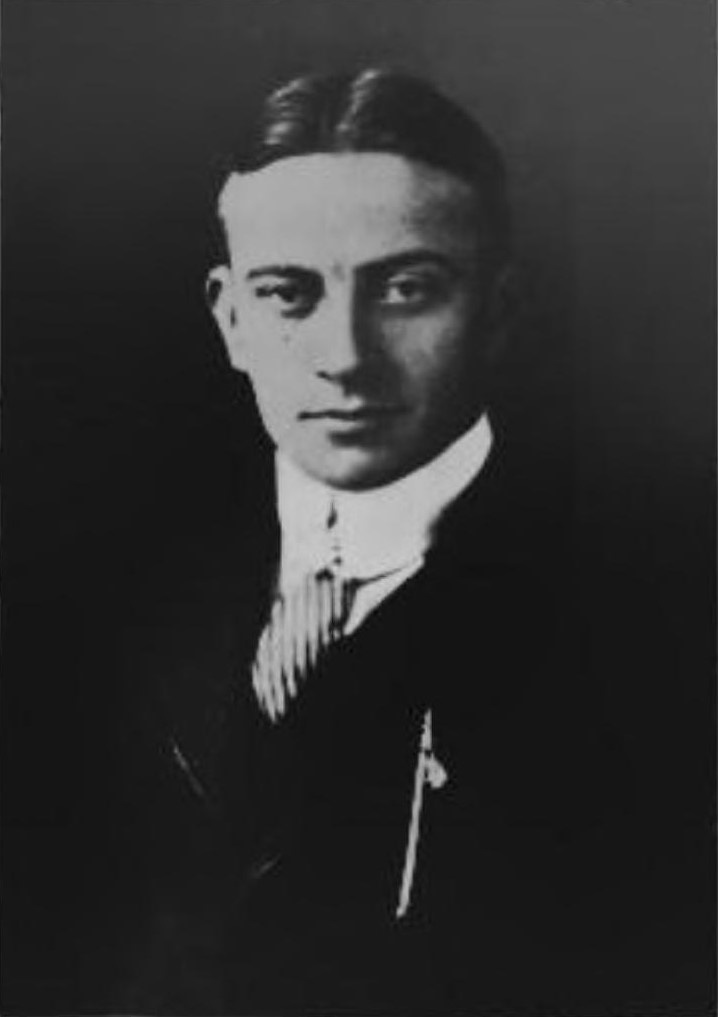
- Church: Episcopal Church
- Diocese: Washington
- Elected: November 23, 1943
- In office: 1944–1962
- Predecessor: James E. Freeman
- Successor: William Creighton

Orders
- Ordination: November 20, 1917 by William Lawrence
- Consecration: April 19, 1944 by Henry St. George Tucker

Personal details
- Born: May 4, 1892 New York City, New York, United States
- Died: August 12, 1971 (aged 79) Washington, D.C., United States
- Buried: Bethlehem Chapel of Washington National Cathedral
- Denomination: Anglican
- Parents: Henry Walke Dun & Sarah Robinson Hazard
- Spouse: Catherine Whipple Pew
- Children: 2
- Education: The Albany Academy; Yale University, B.A. (1914); Episcopal Divinity School, S.T.B. (1917)
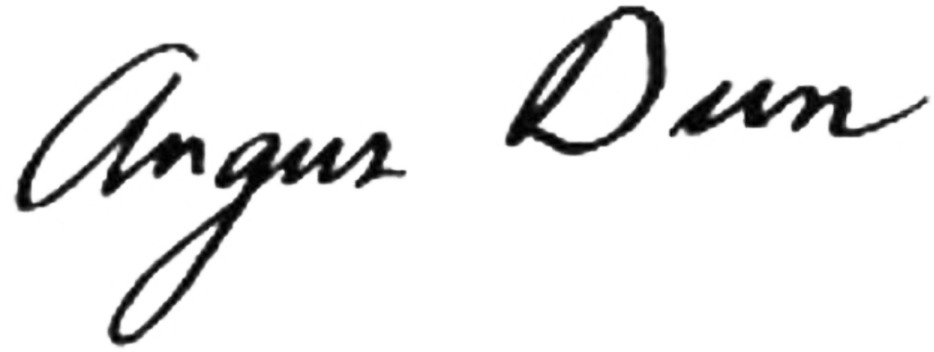
- Signature

Angus Dun (May 4, 1892 – August 12, 1971) was a noted United States clergyman and author, who was the 4th Bishop of the Episcopal Diocese of Washington in Washington, DC.

== Life and work ==
=== Early life ===
Angus Dun, son of Henry W. and Sarah R. (Hazard) Dun, was born in New York City. His father was associated with a cousin, Robert G. Dun, in the credit-rating firm of R. G. Dun & Co., which later merged to become Dun & Bradstreet. He was born with deformed hands and feet, and spent most of his childhood shuttling from hospital to hospital. At the age of 11, he was paralyzed by polio. Complications led to the amputation of one of his legs. Despite his handicaps, he prepared for college at The Albany Academy in Albany, New York. He graduated from Yale University in 1914 with a BA degree. At Yale, he was a member of Elihu and was elected to Phi Beta Kappa. Religion had been a casual interest for him until, while at Yale, he came under the influence of Dr. Henry B. Wright, Professor of Theology. Although he had grown up in the Dutch Reformed Church, he joined the Episcopal Church and decided to become a priest. He graduated from Episcopal Theological School in Cambridge, Massachusetts, in 1917 with a Bachelor of Sacred Theology (S.T.B.) degree. He was ordained a deacon on May 17, 1917, and a priest on November 20, 1917, by the Right Rev. William Lawrence, Bishop of the Episcopal Diocese of Massachusetts. He was married to Catherine Whipple Pew, daughter of Brig. Gen. William A. and Alice (Huntington) Pew of Salem, Massachusetts, on June 22, 1916, in Salem. They had two sons.

=== Vicar and professor ===
Soon after graduating from Episcopal Theological School, he became vicar at St. Andrew's Church in Ayer, Massachusetts, and of its mission in Forge Village (now St. Mark's Church in Westford, Massachusetts). The nature of his work here was altered by the fact that the United States had declared war on Germany on April 6, 1917. Several miles from the church, 5,000 acres (20 km^{2}) of wood lots and fields were almost immediately transformed into a complete city for 10,000 men with barracks and training buildings, named Camp Devens, later known as Fort Devens. Construction, commenced on June 19 by the largest labor force ever assembled in the United States, raced at the rate of 10.4 new buildings every day. By September 4, the military base was ready and the first draft inductees arrived. On September 15, 1917, the Reverend Angus Dun and the Reverend Dr. Endicott Peabody, headmaster at Groton School, conducted the first services, sponsored by the Young Men's Christian Association (YMCA), for the newly arrived men. In the course of the first year, over 60,000 inductees were processed. Rev. Dun's principal work was as a civilian chaplain to the service men; the parish assisted him as they could. During the war, union services of the Federated, Unitarian, and St. Andrew's parishes were held at the YMCA on West Main Street in Ayer. After a year and a half as vicar, he left in the spring of 1919 to continue his studies at the Universities of Oxford and Edinburgh.

From 1920 to 1940, he was an instructor, assistant professor and professor of theology at Episcopal Theological School in Cambridge, Massachusetts. From 1940 to 1944, he was dean of the School. He was known for his very strong pacifist views. In a November 1922 sermon he stated, "The time may come when patriotism and Christ will stand face to face and men will have to choose which they will follow. If the Christian Church does not develop men with the courage to choose Christ, mankind will find no abiding peace and the church will lose its soul." He was also known for his distinctly Modernist beliefs. In January 1924, he co-signed a letter sent to alumni of the Episcopal Theological School proposing that the creeds be reconsidered—"The Church is greater than the creeds. The central faith in God as He is found in Christ, upon which the Church is built, is not destroyed or diminished by doubts concerning the method of Christ's birth, of His return to God or His future judgement. The Church made the creeds. The creeds did not make the Church."

=== Bishop ===
On November 23, 1943, the Very Rev. Angus Dun was elected the fourth Bishop of the Episcopal Diocese of Washington on the third ballot. He was consecrated at Washington National Cathedral on April 19, 1944, in a service led by 10 bishops, including the Archbishop of York. It was the first time since 1871 that an English bishop had participated in an American consecration. In his inaugural sermon, he decried Americans' "lofty moral tone" and preached that patriotism and nationalism could be "evil" if not bound to God as well as the country. He would later continue that theme, clashing with President Truman at a retreat and saying that the Christian faith could not be "mobilized by political leadership for political ends, however good."

Only one year after his consecration, he officiated the brief funeral of President Franklin D. Roosevelt.

During the 18 years of his episcopate, Bishop Dun confirmed more than 31,000 people, ordained 105 deacons and 91 priests, and visited two and sometimes three parishes every Sunday. Most important, he was a strong proponent of the ecumenical movement. He served for 10 years on the Central Committee of World Council of Churches, founded in Amsterdam in 1948. He was named an Honorary Commander of the Order of the British Empire (CBE) by Queen Elizabeth II in 1953. He retired from his position as bishop on May 6, 1962, at the age of 70.

=== Death and tributes ===
The Right Rev. Angus Dun died on August 12, 1971, in Washington, D.C. Funeral services were held at the Cathedral of St. Peter and St. Paul in Washington, D.C., where a delegation of eight bishops, including the Presiding Bishop of the Episcopal Church, the Most Rev. John E. Hines, led the clerical and lay mourners. His ashes were later interred in a niche in the wall of Bethlehem Chapel in the cathedral. The carved inscription reads:

ANGUS DUN
BISHOP OF WASHINGTON
1944-1962
LEADER IN THE EPISCOPAL CHURCH
AND FRIEND OF OTHER FAITHS
STATESMAN IN THE ECUMENICAL MOVEMENT
TEACHER AUTHOR AND ADMINISTRATOR
HIS PROPHETIC VISION OF GOD'S WORD
HIS INTEGRITY PERSONAL COURAGE
AND AFFIRMATION OF LIFE GAVE
COURAGE AND STRENGTH TO US ALL

In an editorial about his life, The Washington Post wrote:

During his 18 years as the Bishop of Washington, Angus Dun was a force for tolerance, for interracial understanding and for freedom. Behind the austerity of his official mien, there lay a wealth of humor and kindness. He was concerned more to help than to punish, to heal than to condemn.... Such a life must bring its own rich sense of duty done and of rewards that lie beyond any earthly grasp.

== Bibliography ==
- King's Cross: Meditations on the Seven Last Words (1926)
- Meanings of Unity (1937)
- Studies in Church Unity (1938)
- We Believe: A Simple Exposition of the Creeds (1938)
- Not By Bread Alone (1942)
- Prospecting for A United Church (1948)
- The Saving Person (1957)

Episcopal Church (USA) titles
Preceded by James E. Freeman	Bishop of Washington; 1944–1962	Succeeded by William F. Creighton
