= James Creighton =

James Creighton may refer to:

- Jim Creighton (1841–1862), baseball player
- James Creighton (ice hockey) (1850–1930), Canadian ice hockey pioneer from Nova Scotia
- James Edwin Creighton (1861–1924), American philosopher
- James Forbes Creighton (1879–1944), physician and politician in Saskatchewan, Canada
- Jimmy Creighton (1905–1990), ice hockey player
- James M. Creighton (1856–1946), American architect in Arizona
- Jim Creighton (basketball) (born 1950), American basketball player
