= Charles Creighton =

Charles Creighton may refer to:

- Charles Creighton (physician) (1847–1927), British physician and medical author
- Charles F. Creighton (1863–1907), Attorney General of the Kingdom of Hawaii, 1892
- Charles W. Creighton (1885–1947), American politician and lawyer
