= Wellington Jeffers =

Canadian teacher (1814–1896)

Wellington Jeffers (22 June 1814 – 10 February 1896) was a Canadian teacher, Methodist minister, and editor. He served as editor of Toronto's Christian Guardian between 1860 and 1869. In 1863 he was granted an honorary Doctorate of Divinity from Victoria College.
