= Craigton =

Craigton can refer to:

- Craigton, Angus, a village in Angus, Scotland
- Craigton, East Dunbartonshire, an area of Milngavie, Scotland
- Craigton, Glasgow, a suburb of Glasgow, Scotland
  - Craigton (ward), an electoral ward of the Glasgow City Council
- Craigton, Highland, a village in Highland, Scotland
- Craigton, Stirling, a hamlet in Stirling, Scotland
