= Abraham Creighton =

Abraham Creighton may refer to:

- Abraham Creighton (died 1706), MP for County Fermanagh and Enniskillen
- Abraham Creighton, 1st Baron Erne (1703–1772)
- Abraham Creighton (died 1809), MP for Lifford
- Abraham Creighton, 2nd Earl Erne (1765–1842)
