= William Black Creighton =

- Born: William Black Creighton; July 20, 1864; Dorchester, Ontario, Canada
- Died: October 30, 1946 (aged 82); Toronto
- Education: B.A., Victoria College, 1890; D.D., 1894
- Spouse: Laura Harvie Creighton
- Children: Donald Creighton

William Black Creighton was a Canadian minister, editor, social reformer, and pacifist.

He received a B.A. at Victoria University in the University of Toronto in 1890. In 1894 he received his D.D. and was ordained a Methodist minister.

He was the assistant editor of The Christian Guardian from 1900 to 1906, and editor from 1906 to 1925. "Under his pen, the Guardian moved into the vanguard of the prewar progressive peace movement". When his publication became The New Outlook in 1925 he remained as editor until 1937.

Creighton's role in the Canadian peace movement has been compared to that of his American counterpart, Charles Clayton Morrison, editor of The Christian Century". Also, he is considered "responsible for shaping the attitudes of a generation of Canadians on the issues of war and peace".
