= Crichton, West Virginia =

Unincorporated community in West Virginia, United States

- Unincorporated community
- Location within West Virginia Location within the United States
- Coordinates: 38°03′22″N 80°42′58″W
- Country: United States
- State: West Virginia
- County: Greenbrier
- Elevation: 2,940 ft (900 m)
- Time zone: UTC-5 (Eastern (EST))
  - Summer (DST): UTC-4 (EDT)
- Area codes: 304 & 681
- GNIS feature ID: 1554222

Crichton is an unincorporated community and coal town in Greenbrier County, West Virginia, United States. Crichton is located near the western border of Quinwood.

== History ==
Crichton was founded as a company town in 1921 by Walter Crichton for the nearby mine. The town and the mine were subsidiaries of Johnstown Coal and Coke, which was a large mining company with its headquarters in Johnstown, Pennsylvania. The company was formed in 1912 by Walter Crichton's brothers Harry and Andrew and the mine at Crichton was the first in a series of mines Walter was responsible for as the company expanded its reach into West Virginia and western Maryland. The mine closed in 1951 and Johnstown Coal and Coke itself ceased all operations in 1959. The town is still home to approximately 100 residents and an elementary school.
