= Robert Crichton (comics) =

Supporting character in media based on DC Comics

Robert Crichton is a supporting character in various media based on DC Comics series. He is typically established as the warden of a prison or mental hospital.

Crichton was created for Batman (1966), where he is portrayed by David Lewis and depicted as the warden of Gotham City's prison. A separate character based on Crichton appears in the sequel comic Batman '66 as the warden of Gotham Penitentiary. In contrast to the original depiction of the character, this version is an African-American woman.
