= Broadview (magazine) =

Canadian magazine published by the United Church of Canada

- Editor: Jocelyn Bell
- Categories: Faith-based journalism
- Frequency: 8 per year
- Circulation: 27,000
- First issue: June 10, 1925
- Company: Observer Publications Inc.
- Country: Canada
- Based in: Suite 304, 177 Danforth Avenue, Toronto, ON M4K 1N2
- Language: English
- Website: broadview.org
- ISSN: 0041-7238

Broadview is a Canadian magazine focused on national and international issues of spirituality, justice and ethical living as well as United Church of Canada news and perspectives. Formerly the United Church Observer, the magazine was rebranded as Broadview in April 2019. The publication has a paid circulation of 27,000 copies distributed by subscription and newsstand sales. Broadview and Broadview.org are owned and operated by Observer Publications Inc., a non-profit corporation.

== History ==
Broadview traces its roots back almost two centuries to The Christian Guardian, founded with Methodist minister Egerton Ryerson as the editor. The publication's long history makes it the oldest continuously published magazine in North America and the second oldest in the English-speaking world. The Christian Guardian was regarded as a major voice in the life of a growing country: it commented not only on matters of religion in Canada but education and political affairs. Ryerson went on to serve in government and is credited with founding the public school system in Upper Canada.

The United Church of Canada was formed in 1925 through the union of Methodists, Presbyterians and Congregational churches. The publications for each of those denominations, including The Christian Guardian, merged to form The New Outlook.

In 1938, the church's General Council amalgamated The New Outlook with two other church publications, United Church Record and Missionary Review, to form the United Church Observer. In 1986, the publication was independently incorporated. Although the magazine maintains a healthy relationship with The United Church of Canada, it sets its own editorial policies.

The United Church Observer had only five editors in its 80 years: Rev. A.J. Wilson (1939–55); Rev. Alfred C. Forrest (1955–79); Hugh McCullum (1980–90); Muriel Duncan (1990–2006); David Wilson (2006–2017) and the current editor, Jocelyn Bell (2018- ).

In spring 2019, the publication was renamed Broadview with Jocelyn Bell as its editor/publisher.

== Current ==
Observer Publications Inc. is affiliated with The United Church of Canada but was separately incorporated in 1986, and operates independently with its own policies, procedures, and editorial programs.

Broadview's ongoing affiliation with The United Church of Canada includes an annual grant that makes up less than six percent of Broadview's total revenues. Other details of the two organizations' affiliation are documented in a 2013 legal "Covenant" agreement.

Broadview's editorial pillars are spirituality, ethical living and social justice issues. The publication's mission is to produce a magazine and digital platforms that serve progressive Christians, as well as those who share progressive Christianity's core values. "We understand this means being both introspective and outward-looking," editor/publisher Jocelyn Bell says. "It requires us to examine our beliefs and values, and to live and act accordingly. It calls us to engage deeply with the justice issues of our day — and to believe that hope lies in caring profoundly for one another and for our planet."

Approximately a quarter of the magazine is devoted to United Church of Canada news and perspectives.

== Awards ==
The magazine's editorial content has won international acclaim for journalistic excellence, and has garnered more awards than any other faith-based publication in Canada. For example, in recent years:

- At the 2020 National Magazine Awards, editor Jocelyn Bell was awarded the Editor Grand Prix, and the magazine was awarded three Honourable Mentions.
- Broadview was named "Best Magazine Special Interest" for two consecutive years (2020 and 2021) at the National Magazine Awards.
- In 2024, Broadview was:
  - Nominated for five National Magazine Awards
  - Awarded Bronze Merit Award by the Society of Publication Designers
  - Awarded 12 Associated Church Press Awards
  - Awarded 8 First Place Awards and 5 Awards of Merit by the Canadian Christian Communicators Association
