= Trevor Chowning =

American pop artist

Trevor Chowning is an American film producer and pop artist known for his extensive use of unique materials and strange objects in his work. Paintings have featured precious metals such as gold or silver leaf, and have included everything from antique hummingbird feathers, genuine diamonds, animal bones and obsolete pieces of NASA spacecraft among other things.

== Entertainment career ==
Before picking up the paintbrush, Chowning worked in the New York City music scene and as a Hollywood talent manager and producer representing Johnny Cash's band and MTV celebrities such as Tina Barta. He is widely credited with reviving the career of Cash's band after the singer's death. His TV and film career spans projects such as "Lone Star" for Fox TV, with other projects for Universal Studios, and Doug Liman of Hypnotic (Director of Swingers, Go, Bourne Identity, Mr. & Mrs. Smith). Chowning acted as casting director for the Victor Buhler film Chaperone, which later won the Martin Scorsese Director's Award and was nominated for an Academy Award. He presently works as a Producer in film, television and online media with several feature and short films in development and production.

== Notable artworks ==
He was noted in 2007 for his controversial art piece "Lindsay Lohan Child's Costume" which was originally censored at the World of Wonder gallery but later placed back on exhibit. His "Damien Hearse" homage to Damien Hirst was a large model hearse cast in metal and covered with over 3,000 rhinestones. Chowning's 2008 body of work included a silver leafed painting of the James Dean death car for the "DepARTed" gallery show and a revealing look at Madonna for the "Dial M for Madonna" group show, both in Hollywood, CA. An art show celebrating the American election opened in Los Angeles in October 2008 titled "Hollywood D.C.- Lights, Camera, Election!" and showcased some of his newer work.

On January 20, 2009 the artist revealed his Inauguration Portrait of Barack Obama titled "Inspiration". The painting featured an optimistic President Obama in the foreground, with an ethereal Abraham Lincoln laying a guiding hand upon the new leader's shoulder.

In the summer of 2013 Chowning was chosen to create the official "Masterpiece Edition: Portland" bottle for Absolut Vodka. His four-foot tall replica was displayed on the city's waterfront during summer festivities.

== Exhibitions ==
Diesel Jeans of Italy sponsored his three-month solo exhibit at their Portland, OR store. It was Chowning's longest running exhibition to date and featured over a dozen original works, including a Fabergé egg replica made from a real Peanut M&M paved in real diamonds and presented beneath a glass dome.

His close friend, the actor Daniel Franzese has curated several art exhibits in Los Angeles and has included Chowning in every show to date. Franzese's interest in Chowning's art began when the artist gave him a small handmade ornament featuring the likeness of the rapper Notorious B.I.G.

== Trademark ==
Trevor Chowning is the creator and trademark holder of "¥£$", the combination of monetary symbols for the Yen, British Pound, and United States Dollar features in his artwork in a series of prints and posters. One of his original paintings featuring the slogan utilizes gold leaf for the symbols and is studded with thirty genuine diamonds.

As of 2009, Chowning is a supporting artist of the Aspie Art project that benefits artists who have Asperger syndrome, a condition on the autism spectrum.

== Pre-art life ==
Chowning worked as an A&R representative and studio manager for Antique Boutique Audio in New York City before relocating to Southern California. While with AB Audio he signed former Death Comet Crew founder Shinichi Shimokawa, Grammy Award Nominee Larry Tee, Alexi DeLano among others. He also worked with NASA club founder, Scotto, hosting a weekly night at NYC's club Carbon, the same venue that was hosting Michael Alig's club night at the time of his arrest for murder, as depicted in the film Party Monster.

He is the Los Angeles liaison for the Indiana Media Industry Network (IMIN), an organization that worked to successfully pass a tax incentive bill to aid filmmakers wishing to shoot in his home state of Indiana. In March 2005 he accompanied actor Sean Astin, an IMIN supporter, to Indiana where the star spoke at the Statehouse and met with then-Governor Mitch Daniels to gain support for the bill. He works alternately from studios in Indiana and rural Oregon.

== Sources ==
- TMZ: http://photos.tmz.com/galleries/hollywood_dc#29094
- Sean Astin official website: https://web.archive.org/web/20080503234415/http://www.seanastin.com/cin05smileprem.htm
- World of Wonder, Hollywood DC: http://worldofwonder.net/gallery/hollywooddc/
- Saatchi Gallery UK: http://www.saatchi-gallery.co.uk/yourgallery/artist_profile/Trevor+Chowning/103720.
