= Croughton =

Croughton may refer to:

- The village of Croughton, Northamptonshire, England
- The hamlet of Croughton, Cheshire, England
- The airbase of RAF Croughton in Northamptonshire, England
