= David Crichton =

Canadian freestyle skier

David Crichton (born October 20, 1983) is a professional freestyle skier and former member of the Canadian National Development Ski Team for freestyle mogul skiing.

== Biography ==
David Crichton was born in Ottawa, Ontario and grew up in the suburb of Manotick, Ontario. He got into skiing at age 6, which was the same time his older brothers Michael and Mark began skiing. Over the following years, various family vacations to Vermont for spring break got the family hooked on freestyle skiing. Eventually the whole family, including youngest sister Jennifer, were participating in mogul and other competitions throughout Canada on a regular basis over the course of the whole winter. By age 13, and after years of keeping up with them, David surpassed his older brothers in skiing ability.

As a freestyle mogul competitor, David won the 1999 Canadian Junior National Championships. He was only 15 years old at the time, which meant he had defeated many competitors as old as 19 years old to take that title. Also during that season David was a finalist in a Nor-Am moguls competition, as well as a bronze medalist in moguls at the 1999 Canada Winter Games in Corner Brook, Newfoundland and Labrador. It was no surprise that at the end of the 1999 winter David was called up to the Canadian National Development Ski Team for moguls. As a 15-year-old, he was one of the youngest ever to join the team.

Although David enjoyed competitive moguls very much, the sport of freestyle skiing was rapidly changing, and his true passion was with newschool skiing, including terrain park, halfpipe skiing and urban rails. In 2001 David won the World Skiing Invitational (WSI) slopestyle event at Whistler-Blackcomb, and placed third in the WSI big air event. In 2002, David placed third in both the halfpipe and big air events at the US Freeskiing Open at Vail Ski Resort, and won the best hit event at the 2002 WSI. In 2004, David won the US Open halfpipe event, and was also crowned world champion at the World Superpipe Championships in Utah. David has competed in multiple ESPN Winter X Games events such as slopestyle and halfpipe. In 2004, David performed one of the first 1080s in halfpipe competition at the Winter X Games, and narrowly lost out on winning the event due to controversial judging. As well, over 2000-2004, David consistently won numerous Molson Snow Jam quarterpipe events across North America, as well as other events.

In addition to the above, David has appeared in many ski films by such companies as Poorboyz Productions, Level 1 Productions, Teton Gravity Research Productions and Aggressive Instincts Productions. His segments in Level One's "Forward", Poorboyz's "Ready Fire Aim", and Aggressive Instincts' "Guinea Pigs" are all noteworthy. Over many years, David has appeared in magazines such as FREEZE, Freeskier Magazine and SBC Skier, and has had full-length feature articles written about him and his accomplishments in some of those magazines.

David's sponsors over the years include Dynastar, DNA, Spy, and numerous others. Dynastar and Spy each made signature pro model skis and goggles, respectively, in David's name.
