= Ernest Creighton =

English cricketer

Ernest Creighton (9 July 1859 – 17 February 1931) was an English first-class cricketer, who played four matches for Yorkshire in 1888.

Born in Hemsworth, Yorkshire, England, Creighton was a slow left-arm spinner, who took 10 wickets at the average of 18.10, with a best of 4 for 22 against Surrey. A tail-end batsman, he scored 33 runs at 5.50 with a best innings of 10. Creighton played in four successive matches in a fortnight for Yorkshire.

A builder by trade, he was professional at Ramsbottom, Lancashire, in 1879, and later at Todmorden from 1888 to 1894 and 1900 to 1901. He took over 100 wickets in each season, totalling 908 in all.

He died aged 71, in Leeds, Yorkshire.
