= Breen Creighton =

Australian law professor

Breen Creighton is a Professor of Law at RMIT University, and one of Australia's leading labour law scholars.

Creighton was a member of the Administrative Review Council from 1987 until 1988.

== Published works ==
- Labour Law Text and Materials - with WJ Ford and RJ Mitchell.
- Labour Laws: An Introduction (Federation Press) - with Andrew Stewart.

Academic Rosemary Hunter suggested that the first edition did not adequately consider the situation of female workers. Referring to the 1994 edition, the Australian Law Librarian said this "useful, well-organised" general introductory text looking at the subject of labour laws in Australia "incorporates all of the momentous changes in the field of labour law", though provides "more an overview than an exhaustive treatment" of the subject.

- Occupational Health and Safety Law in Victoria (Federation Press, 2007) - with Peter Rozen.
- Rediscovering Collective Bargaining: Australia's Fair Work Act in International Perspective (Routledge, 2012) - with Anthony Forsyth.
