= The Admirable Crichton (disambiguation) =

The Admirable Crichton is a comic stage play written in 1902 by J. M. Barrie.

The Admirable Crichton may also refer to:

- The Admirable Crichton (1918 film), a British silent comedy film
- The Admirable Crichton (1950 TV production), a British TV adaptation of the play
- The Admirable Crichton (1957 film), a British comedy film
- The Admirable Crichton (1968 film), a US TV movie adaptation of the play
- James Crichton (1560–1582), Scottish polymath, known as the Admirable Crichton
