= Pamela Klassen =

Scholar of religion

Pamela E. Klassen
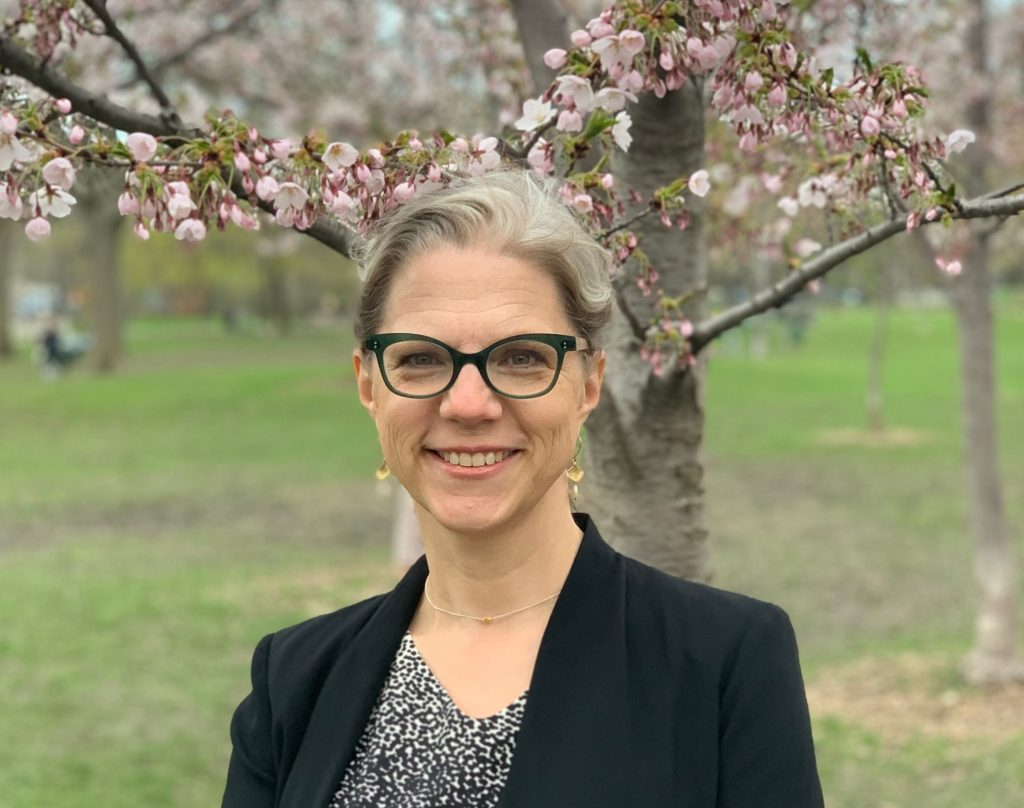

Academic background
- Education: B.A., 1989, McGill University; M.A., 1992, Wilfrid Laurier University; PhD., 1997, Drew University
- Thesis: Blessed Events: Religion and Gender in the Practice of Home Birth (1997)
- Doctoral advisor: Karen McCarthy Brown

Academic work
- Discipline: Religion
- Institutions: University of Toronto
- Main interests: Religion and Secularism in North America
- Notable works: The Story of Radio Mind: A Missionary’s Journey on Indigenous Land, Spirits of Protestantism: Medicine, Healing, and Liberal Christianity, Blessed Events: Religion and Home Birth in America

Pamela E. Klassen FRSC is a Professor in the Department for the Study of Religion at the University of Toronto, co-appointed to the Department of Anthropology at the University of Toronto and Osgoode Hall Law School at York University. In 2019, Klassen was elected a Fellow of the Royal Society of Canada.

== Education ==
Klassen completed her undergraduate studies in Political Science at McGill University in 1989. In 1992, Klassen earned The Graduate Gold Medal for Master of Arts at Wilfrid Laurier University for her thesis "Going by the Moon and the Stars: Stories of Two Russian Mennonite Women."

== Career ==
Klassen joined the Department for the Study of Religion Faculty at the University of Toronto (U of T) in 1997 after earning her PhD. In 2002, she was granted tenure by the University and eventually promoted to Full Professor by 2011.

Under supervision of Karen McCarthy Brown, Klassen completed her PhD thesis on religion and home birth in 1997. She joined the Department for the Study of Religion at the University of Toronto shortly thereafter. Her doctoral work was published as a book entitled Blessed Events: Religion and Home Birth in America, which described how women who give birth at home use religion to make sense of their births and in turn draw on their birthing experiences to bring meaning to their lives and families. Her next book, Spirits of Protestantism: Medicine, Healing, and Liberal Christianity, won the American Academy of Religion Award for Excellence in 2012.

In 2012, she was the recipient of the American Academy of Religion Award for Excellence in Religion for her book Spirits of Protestantism: Medicine, Healing, and Liberal Christianity. Three years later, she received the Anneliese Maier Research Award, which included a €250,000 grant to study the role of religion and memory. That year, she also received the Northrop Frye Award for distinguished achievements in linking teaching and research, for a third-year Religion in the city course co-taught with Professor Frances Garrett, and a Museums and Material Religion course with Professor Ajay Rao. In 2016, Klassen was appointed Vice-Dean of Undergraduate Education at the Faculty of Arts and Sciences at the University of Toronto. In 2018, she published The Story of Radio Mind: A Missionary’s Journey on Indigenous Land through The University of Chicago Press.

In 2019, Klassen was elected a Fellow of the Royal Society of Canada.
