= Creightons =

British company

Creightons Plc
- Company type: Public Limited Company
- Traded as: LSE: CRL
- Industry: Consumer goods
- Founded: 1975; 51 years ago
- Headquarters: Peterborough, England, UK
- Key people: William McIlroy; (Executive Chairman); Bernard Johnson; (Executive Managing Director)
- Revenue: ▲£47.8 million (2020)
- Operating income: ▲£3.8 million (2020)
- Net income: ▲£3.2 million (2020)
- Website: creightonsplc.com

Creightons Plc is a manufacturer of consumer goods headquartered in Peterborough, United Kingdom, whose shares are listed on the FTSE Fledgling Index. It was first listed on the London Stock Exchange in 1987. It manufactures and markets personal care and beauty products for the consumer and trade market.
