= John Creighton (surgeon) =

Irish surgeon, President of the RSCI

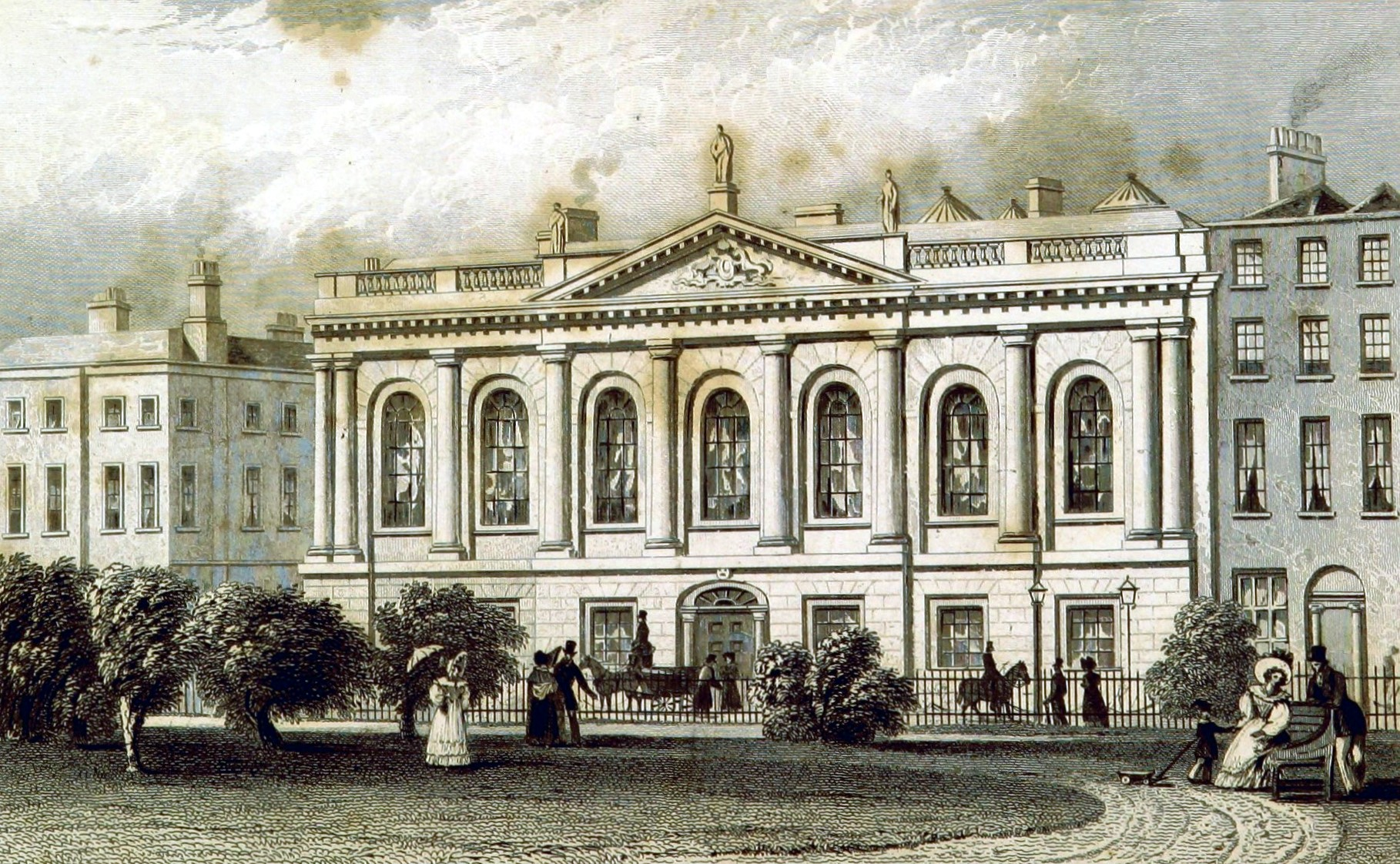
"The College of Surgeons, Dublin". 1837.

John Creighton (1768 – 11 August 1827) was the president of the Royal College of Surgeons in Ireland (RCSI) in 1812 and 1824.

John Creighton obtained the Letters Testimonial of the Royal College of Surgeons in Ireland (RCSI) in 1792, and became a Member soon after. He served as surgeon to the Foundlings' Hospital for the period of 30 years.

It seems certain that Creighton first introduced the practice of vaccination into Ireland. He served "without fee or reward" as Physician to the Cowpock Institution, established in 1800 at 26 Exchequer-street in Dublin. Creighton had a large practice, and his patients were amongst the most fashionable classes. He attended the family of the great Duke of Wellington when, as Sir Arthur Wellesley, he was Chief Secretary to the Lord Lieutenant. Creighton was regarded as peculiarly skilful in the treatment of diseases incidental to infancy. In 1794, he succeeded Sir Henry Jebb as Professor of Midwifery in the RCSI.

== See also ==
- List of presidents of the Royal College of Surgeons in Ireland
