= Charles W. Creighton =

American politician and lawyer

Charles Wilbur Creighton (August 31, 1885 – June 23, 1947) was an American politician and lawyer.

Creighton was born on a farm in Wayne County, Illinois. He went to the public schools. Creighton studied at McKendree University, Southern Illinois University Carbondale and the Northern Illinois University College of Law. He had taught in the Wayne County schools. Creighton practiced law in Fairfield, Illinois and served as state's attorney for Wayne County. He served on the board of education and was president of the board of education. Creighton was a Democrat. He served in the Illinois House of Representatives in 1943 and 1944. Creighton died in Fairfield, Illinois from a heart attack.
