= James Edwin Creighton =

American philosopher (1861–1924)

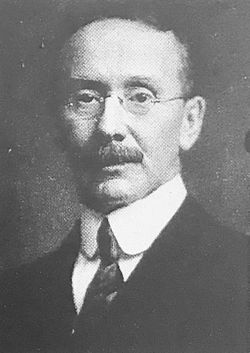
- Born: Pictou, Nova Scotia
- Died: Ithaca, New York
- Burial place: East Lawn Cemetery
- Occupations: Professor, Academic

Academic background
- Education: Dalhousie University, B.A. Cornell University, Ph.D.

James Edwin Creighton (April 8, 1861, Pictou, Nova Scotia – October 8, 1924, Ithaca, New York) was an American idealist philosopher, Cornell academic. He was the founding president of the American Philosophical Association.

== Biography ==
Creighton graduated as a Bachelor of Arts from Dalhousie College, Halifax, in 1887, and became a student at the foreign universities of Leipzig and Berlin. Later he came to Cornell University as a graduate student, receiving the degree of Doctor of Philosophy there in 1892. From 1889 to 1892, Dean Creighton was an instructor in philosophy at Cornell, being advanced during the three following years to an associate professorship. He had been Sage professor of logic and metaphysics since 1895, and acted from 1914 to 1923 as Dean of the Graduate School at Cornell.

As an author, he was best known to students through his “Introductory Logic,” first published in 1898, which is widely employed as a college textbook. He collaborated in the translation of "Wundt's Human and Animal Psychology," and "Paulsen's Kant - His Life and Philosophy." In addition to publishing these books, he had been since 1892 editor of The Philosophical Review, and since 1896 American editor of "Kant-Studien. He was also the founding president of the American Philosophical Association.

He was early influenced by Kant, Bradley and Bosanquet, and later accepted some of the views of Windelband and Heinrich Rickert, without sharing all of their opinions. He constantly defended Idealistic, or speculative, philosophy against Pragmatism, neo-Realism, Materialism, and Berkeleian materialism.

Creighton differentiated between what he considered as intelligible in philosophy and what is intelligible in the natural sciences. He also believed that no system of thought could be the product of an isolated mind. His most important essays were compiled in Studies in Speculative Philosophy (Creighton, 1925; see also Sabine, 1917).

Creighton was awarded the honorary degree of Doctor of Laws by Queen's University and Dalhousie University. He remained at Cornell until his death from an extended illness. He is buried at East Lawn Cemetery in Ithaca.

== See also ==
- American philosophy
- List of American philosophers
