= John Creighton (Ontario politician) =

John Creighton (August 19, 1817 – January 31, 1885) was an Irish-born publisher, politician and prison official in Ontario, Canada. He served as mayor of Kingston from 1863 to 1865. Creighton was warden of Kingston Penitentiary from 1871 to 1885.

== Biography ==
The son of Hugh Creighton and Mary Young, he was born near Clandeboye, County Down and came to Kingston with his family in 1823. Creighton was educated at the Midland District Grammar School. He worked as an apprentice printer in Montreal, then returned to Kingston to work for the Kingston Chronicle & Gazette. He became president of the Kingston Typographical Society in 1844. In 1846, he moved to the Kingston Argus; he also contributed articles to the paper.

On October 8th of 1850, Creighton married Frances Coverdale, the sister of architect William Coverdale, who designed Kingston Penitentiary and Kingston City Hall.

He became a clerk in a book and stationery store in 1851, later buying the store. Creighton later added printing and bookbinding services. He served on the Kingston City Council from 1859 to 1861, becoming alderman of his Ward, Victoria Ward, in 1862. Creighton was elected mayor of Kingston in 1863 and reelected by acclamation in 1864 and 1865. Some of his accomplishments as mayor include expanding City Park, restoring the Market Wing of Kingston City Hall after the fire of 1865, and procuring the iconic clock of the dome of Kingston City Hall. In 1866, he was named police magistrate.

John and Frances Creighton had five children together: John, Catherine, Eleanor, Robert, and William. Frances Creighton died on July 15, 1868. Two years later, in 1870, Creighton became acting warden for Kingston Penitentiary. He was officially appointed warden the following year. As warden, he was held in high regard by both the inmates and his superiors.

As a single father, Creighton needed somewhere suitable for his children to live during his tenure as warden. Cedarhedge, the official warden's residence, was constructed for him. Construction completed in 1873.

Creighton remained warden of Kingston Penitentiary until his death. He suffered two heart attacks, the second in 1884. He died the following year in his home, Cedarhedge, in Portsmouth at the age of 67.
