= John Creighton (archaeologist) =

British archaeologist

Dr John Creighton

Academic background
- Education: Durham University

Academic work
- Notable works: Coins and Power in Late Iron Age Britain

John Creighton is a British archaeologist and assistant professor at the University of Reading. His research focuses on the Late Iron Age and Early Roman period of north-western Europe.

== Education ==
Creighton received a PhD from Durham University in 1992 entitled The circulation of money in Roman Britain from the first to third century, supervised by John Casey. He studied under the Leslie Brooks Fellowship and resided in a room just above the St Cuthbert's Society wine cellar.

== Career ==
From 2005-10 Creighton directed the University of Reading's Centre for Excellence in Teaching and Learning, developing links between teaching and research. In 2010 Creighton was a National Teaching Fellow of the Higher Education Academy. From 2010-16 Creighton served as the Director of the Society of Antiquaries.

Creighton has undertaken fieldwork in France, Germany, Spain and Britain. He has co-edited a volume on cultural interactions in Germany.

Creighton has written two key-works reinterpreting the Late Iron Age-Roman transition in south-east Britain. Coins and Power utilised coin imagery to argue that Late Iron Age kings were obsides or hostages, who had been resident in Rome. Coins and Power has been described as a "essential reading for anyone studying the Later Pre-Roman Iron Age or Early Roman period in northern Europe". Britannia utilised a broader range of archaeological evidence to examine the influence of Late Iron Age kings on Roman towns in Britain and the development of the province. The Silchester Mapping Project (2005–10) undertook geophysical survey and digitisation of previous investigations at Silchester.

== Awards and honours ==
Creighton was elected as a Fellow of the Society of Antiquaries in 2003.

== Selected publications ==
=== Books ===
- Creighton, J. (2000) Coins and Power in Late Iron Age Britain. Cambridge: Cambridge University Press.
- Keay, S. Creighton, J. & Remesal, J. (2000) Celti. The Archaeology of a Hispano-Roman Town in Baetica. Survey and Excavations 1987-1992. Oxford: Oxbow Books.
- Creighton, J. (2006) Britannia: The Creation of a Roman Province. Abingdon: Routledge.
- Creighton, J. and Fry, R. (2016) Silchester: Changing Visions of a Roman Town. Integrating Geophysics and Archaeology - the Results of the Silchester Mapping Project 2005-10. Britannia Monograph Series, 28. London: Society for the Promotion of Roman Studies.

=== Journal articles ===
- Creighton, J. (2014) The supply and movement of Denarii in Roman Britain. Britannia, 45. pp. 121–163. https://doi.org/10.1017/S0068113X14000282
- Creighton, J., Haselgrove, C., Lowether, P. and Moore, T. (2008) Becoming Roman in southern Burgundy: A field survey between Autun and Bibracte in the Arroux Valley (Saône-et-Loire), 2000-2003. Internet Archaeology, 25.doi:10.11141/ia.25.3
