= John Creighton (rugby union) =

New Zealand rugby union player (1937–2022)

- Born: John Neville Creighton; 10 March 1937 Rotherham, New Zealand
- Died: 6 April 2022 (aged 85) Christchurch, New Zealand
- Height: 1.82 m (6 ft 0 in)
- Weight: 90 kg (200 lb)
- School: Christchurch Boys' High School
- University: University of Canterbury

Rugby union career
- Position: Hooker
Provincial / State sides
Years	Team	Apps	(Points)
1956–68	Canterbury		
International career
Years	Team	Apps	(Points)
1958–59	NZ Juniors		
1959–67	NZ Universities		
1962	New Zealand	6	(12)

John Neville Creighton (10 March 1937 – 6 April 2022) was a New Zealand rugby union player. A hooker, Creighton represented Canterbury at a provincial level in over 100 games. He was a member of the New Zealand national side, the All Blacks, in 1962, appearing in six matches including one international.

Creighton studied law, and earned his LLB at the University of Canterbury. He was admitted to the bar in 1962, and as of 2017 was still practising as a lawyer in Christchurch. Creighton died in Christchurch on 6 April 2022.
