= Samuel Dwight Chown =

Canadian Methodist minister (1853–1933)

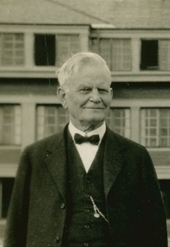
- Samuel Chown at Norway House, Manitoba, 1925
- Born: 11 April 1853; Kingston, Canada West
- Died: 30 January 1933 (aged 79); Toronto, Ontario, Canada
- Occupation: Methodist minister
- Known for: United Church of Canada

Samuel Dwight Chown (11 April 1853 – 30 January 1933) was a Methodist minister who led the Methodist Church of Canada into the United Church of Canada in 1925.

== Early years ==
Samuel Dwight Chown was born on 11 April 1853 in Kingston, then in Canada West. At the age of four he took the pledge to abstain from alcohol. As a youth Chown resisted attending Methodist classes, but he promised he would do so to his dying father, and was converted at the Sydenham Street Church in Kingston in 1868 soon after his father had died. He graduated from the Kingston Military School, and for a short period served in the Prince of Wales Own Rifles. He then worked in his father's hardwood and sheet metal company. He was accepted on probation by the Wesleyan Methodist Church in 1874, attended Victoria College in 1876–1877 and was ordained a minister in 1879.

Chown served in a number of churches. In 1875, he helped Richard Hammond in his revival meetings. Later he led services himself. He said that guiding people to decide to lead a Christian life was the "supreme joy". Chown copied the example of the Salvation Army in using bands to attract people to his meetings. When he was pastor in Sydenham, a small town, he was helped by a band led by the minister David Savage. More than 200 people came to the inquiry room of the Methodist church there, and he thought 150 were "soundly converted."

One of the issues Chown had to deal with was the excesses of revival meetings, which established members of the church considered to be a form of paganism. He wrote later of talking at these meetings that "there spread a contagion of hysteria manifesting itself in prostrations, shocks of glory, while some professed to be able to 'speak with tongues'. ... I had much to do in controlling and in some instances suppressing these hysterical outbreaks in camp meetings and elsewhere. In their inception there was probably something of a religious element but the contagion was largely due to mob psychology."

Chown held pastorates in Toronto from 1894 to 1902, and during this period became involved in Methodist administration. In 1902 he was appointed secretary of the Department of Temperance and Moral Reform, which had just been created. In March 1902 the Ontario provincial parliament passed a bill prohibiting alcohol, subject to ratification by a referendum. Chown objected to the need for a referendum, and organized the Union Prohibition Committee, which later became the Temperance Legislation League, to field candidates in the May 1902 provincial election. The attempt fizzled out, and the referendum failed to gather enough votes for prohibition. Chown was the first head of the Department of Evangelism and Social Service which succeeded the Department of Temperance and Moral Reform. Later Chown noted that the decline in revival was due to a change in emphasis from the need to forsake sin to the nobility of enlisting in Christian service, a change for which he was partly responsible by blurring the lines between evangelism and social service.

== Church leader ==
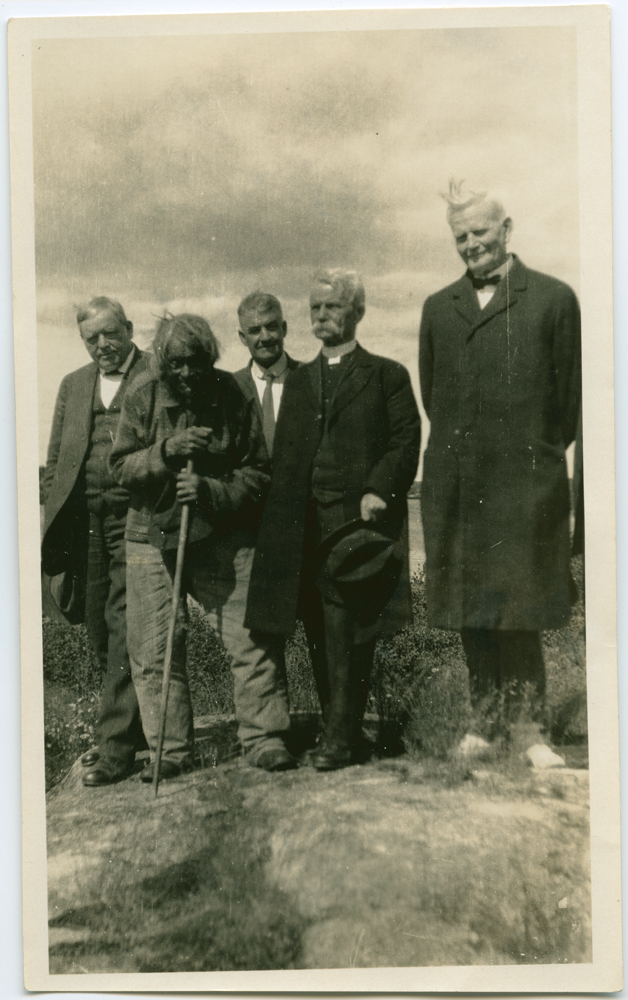
John Memeno, the last Cree Indian to remember James Evans, with church leaders at Norway House, Manitoba, 1925. Chown at the right.

In 1910 Chown was elected one of the two general superintendents of the Methodist Church. He shared the leadership with Albert Carman until Carman retired in 1914. Chown's election to work with the aging, dictatorial and abrasive Carman was due to an alliance between wealthy lay members of the church and theologically liberal ministers.

The Methodist church, the main church in Canada, responded patriotically during World War I (1914–1918). In November 1915 it created the Army and Navy Board to oversee military chaplains and coordinate work in Canada related to the war. Chown and T. Albert Moore, secretary of the General Conference, led the effort. Chown and Moore poured out propaganda for enlistment in the army. His cousin, the feminist, pacifist and socialist Alice Amelia Chown (1866–1949), publicly criticized his pro-war activity. His experience caused him to become an opponent of war and a supporter of the League of Nations.

Chown became seen as the leading churchman in Canada. Critics of Chown's power and ambition called him the "Methodist archbishop". He was the driving force behind uniting the Methodists, Presbyterians and Congregationalists in a new church and managed to get a 6:1 vote in favor from his church members. Since the Methodists were much the largest group in the new church, most people assumed Chown would be chosen as its Moderator. The process of gaining acceptance in the Presbyterian church was much more difficult. Chown decided to withdraw his candidacy just before the founding convention and first General Council of the United Church of Canada. At that meeting the Presbyterian leader, George C. Pidgeon, was unanimously elected with Chown's support.

Chown continued to work for social reform and world peace after he retired in 1926. He died in Toronto on 30 January 1933. Mount Chown, the central and highest mountain of the Resthaven group to the northwest of Jasper, Alberta was named after Chown in 1912 by H.A. Stevens. On 30 May 1975 a Canadian 8 cent postage stamp was issued commemorating Chown.

== Views ==
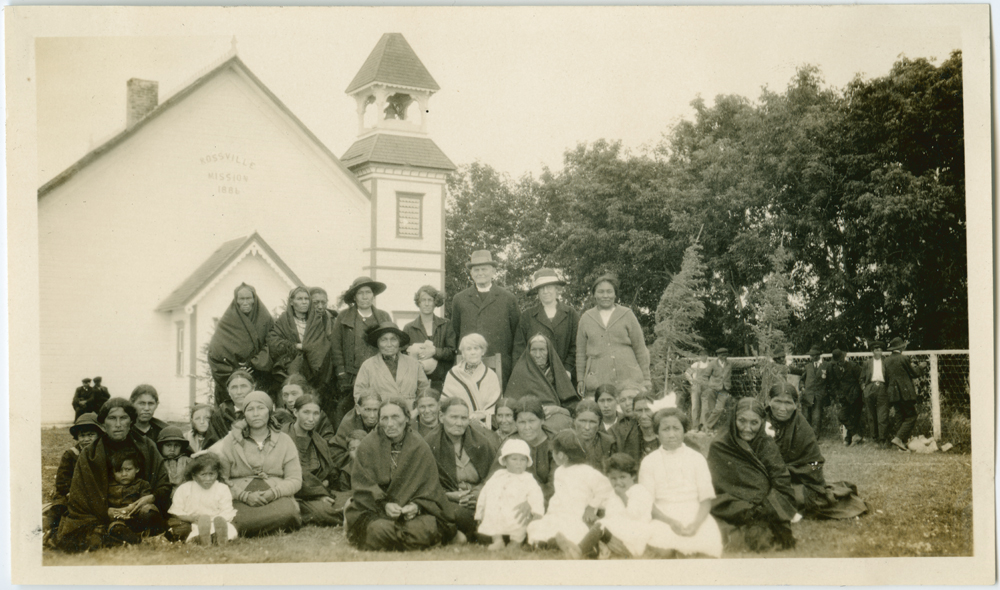
S.D. Chown center rear with residents of Norway House, 1925

Chown supported the change in emphasis in sermons from stern teachings about sin and repentance to a more optimistic message with greater stress on the redeeming love of Christ. He thought this would create a revival of religious belief, and wrote, "The preaching that shall produce it may not be nearly as dramatic as that of the past, and therefore the results may not be so sensationally and superficially striking. We shall not see an angry God laying upon His innocent Son punishment for our sins that we escape punishment, but we shall see a loving sin bearing God pouring out his life for us in the person of his Son."

Chown called the Social Gospel "the voice of prophecy in our time." He supported public welfare and state ownership of public utilities. He was against political socialism with a narrow economic focus based on a monopolist and materialistic state. He said, "Socialism needs the steady, untiring consecration and the dynamic power of the most vigorous type of Christianity attainable; and Christianity would be helped by the outlook of Socialism to attain a practical social objective. Linked in this way, they may become fellow-helpers to the truth which makes men free." Chown welcomed the scientific methodology of the 20th century, and thought social sciences would support rather than replace Christianity. He wrote that modern social science would,

show the young men of our country that the theological student is not a recluse, and that, in its essence, Christianity is ethical, altruistic and aggressive. The associations of the preacher today incline him too much to the feminine side of religion. The minister should know the down-town life of men, and the message it needs. He should be a good mixer. ... Ministers, in the best sense of the word, must be free to be men of affairs, promoters. The Church, to attract virile young men, must blazon forth the possibility of a career, which will justify their consecration to the ministry; and the outstanding fact is that their full equipment is impossible unless they know the world in which they live.

In his view modern Canadians were still attracted by religious experience, but to survive the Protestant churches had to stress a "saving faith" based on the personality and experiences of Jesus. He was against elaborate traditional theology, which he thought separated the church from popular culture and society. He said, "Theology is thought. Religion is life. Chown attacked the way students at the church colleges were taught, saying the curriculum was irrelevant in its focus on ancient systems of theology. Future ministers had to be taught to "enter into dynamic relation" with the modern world, rather than being made "miniature theological professors." He wrote sarcastically of theological studies,

Then we took a balloon, for flying machines were not yet invented, and we sailed sublimely upward, landing on the mountain of eschatology, or the science of the last things—the end of the world, heaven, hell, the judgment and hereafter. These subjects were illuminated by all the lamps which shone in the great field of speculation, and impressed upon us by a formidable body of descriptured philosophy. In this way we were carried in our historical study of theology away up out of sight of the whole realm of sociology.

Chown's thought religious truths were not solely based on holy writings. He thought, "They rest upon nature. ... They rest upon our moral constitution, upon conscience, upon history, upon the corporate religious consciousness of the church and upon the experience of each individual Christian." He believed that personal salvation was essential, not just social reformation. He preached, "Regeneration consciously experienced and testified to by the spirit of God was the outstanding doctrine of Methodism, and it is still our paramount mission to proclaim it." On church union, he said "The movement toward the union of the Churches of Christendom, in order that they may speak with moral authority to divided and sometimes hostile nations, is part of the divine plan for the unification of the world in righteousness.

== Sources ==
- Airhart, Phyllis D. (1992-02-26). Serving the Present Age: Revivalism, Progressivism, and the Methodist Tradition in Canada. McGill-Queen's Press - MQUP. ISBN 978-0-7735-6319-3.
- Campbell, Sandra (2013-05-01). Both Hands: A Life of Lorne Pierce of Ryerson Press. MQUP. ISBN 978-0-7735-8865-3.
- Chown, Diana (2008-03-24). "Alice Amelia Chown". The Canadian Encyclopedia.
- Christie, Nancy; Gauvreau, Michael (2001-01-19). A Full-Orbed Christianity: The Protestant Churches and Social Welfare in Canada, 1900-1940. McGill-Queen's Press - MQUP. ISBN 978-0-7735-2240-4.
- Decarie, Graeme (1998). "SPENCE, FRANCIS STEPHENS". Dictionary of Canadian Biography. Vol. 14. University of Toronto/Université Laval.
- "Dr. S.D. Chown, United Church". Library and Archives Canada.
- French, Goldwin S. (1998). "CARMAN, ALBERT". Dictionary of Canadian Biography. Vol. XIV (1911-1920). University of Toronto/Université Laval.
- Karamitsanis, Aphrodite (1991). Place Names of Alberta: Mountains, mountain parks, and foothills. Alberta Culture and Multiculturalism and Friends of Geographical Names of Alberta Society and University of Calgary Press. ISBN 978-0-919813-73-1.
- Richards, Samuel J. (2007). Ministry of Propaganda: Canadian Methodists, Empire, and Loyalty in World War I. M.A. Thesis, Salisbury University.
- Semple, Neil (1996-04-16). Lord's Dominion: The History of Canadian Methodism. McGill-Queen's Press - MQUP. ISBN 978-0-7735-6575-3.
- Semple, Neil (2008-02-26). "Samuel Dwight Chown". The Canadian Encyclopedia. Historica Canada.
- Shepherd, Paul (2012-06-10). "United we .. keep uniting" (PDF). Iondale Heights United Church, Scarborough.
- Warrick, Susan E. (2013-11-07). Historical Dictionary of Methodism. Scarecrow Press. ISBN 978-0-8108-7894-5.
