= John Creighton (priest) =

John Creighton, D.D. was a 17th-century Anglican Dean in Ireland.

Crosse was Chancellor of Christ Church Cathedral, Dublin from 1643 to 1661 and Dean of Ferns from 1666 to 1670
