= Adam Creighton (journalist) =

Australian journalist and economics editor

Adam Creighton is an Australian journalist and the Washington correspondent for The Australian.

He was previously the economics editor. He has also written for The Wall Street Journal and The Economist, and has appeared on the ABC panel show Q+A. Creighton has received several awards for his journalism and writing.

Creighton holds a Bachelor of Economics with First Class Honours from the University of New South Wales, and Master of Philosophy in Economics from Balliol College, Oxford, where he was a Commonwealth Scholar, and was a journalist-in-residence at the University of Chicago Booth School of Business in 2019. He is also a contributor to Sky News Australia and is a member of the Advisory Council of the National Archives of Australia. The Institute of Public Affairs appointed Creighton as senior fellow and chief economist in January 2025.

Creighton has previously worked at the Reserve Bank of Australia, Centre for Independent Studies and the Australian Prudential Regulation Authority. In 2010, he served as a senior economic adviser to then-Australian opposition leader, Tony Abbott.

== Career and views ==
Creighton is regarded as holding generally conservative views and has been described by Jason Wilson of The Guardian as an "arch-neoliberal", though Creighton contests that definition and describes his views as "old DLP Labor sprinkled with a bit of libertarianism" and points to his stance in favour of land and inheritance taxes, a higher top marginal tax rate for very high incomes, tougher bank and pharmaceutical regulation, abolishing negative gearing and a universal age pension, and his advocacy against privatisation of energy markets. Creighton opposes increased action on climate change by the Australian government, and has warned of the lack of precision of climate and economic modelling, drawing on work by economist Robert Pindyck.

During the COVID-19 pandemic, as the economics editor for The Australian, Creighton was an ardent critic of government-implemented lockdowns to curb the spread of COVID-19, and praised Sweden's less restrictive approach to slowing the spread of the virus. Creighton's defence of the Swedish government response to the COVID-19 pandemic drew criticism from other sections of the media, with Crikey's Guy Rundle claiming that Creighton's columns were "a compendium of false comparisons", and The Guardian's Jason Wilson writing that Creighton's claims were "flatly contradicted by published epidemiological research", citing a paper that did not mention Sweden.

Creighton has referred to strict lockdowns as an affront to personal liberty and reflective of what he calls "health fascism". In April 2020, Creighton signed a joint letter with several dozen people from academia, business and media, calling for a scaling-back of Australia's lockdowns by May. He has argued for open debate and free speech, when commenting on opposition to The Joe Rogan Experience, writing: "It should be OK to have, and to air, a different view from public health officials, especially eminent scientists with long track records of publication, right or wrong."

== Publications ==
- Creighton, Adam; Piggott, John (2006). "The Structure and Performance of Mandated Pensions". In Gordon L. Clark; Alicia H. Munnell; J. Michael Orszag (eds.). The Oxford Handbook of Pensions and Retirement Income. doi:10.1093/oxfordhb/9780199272464.003.0013. ISBN 978-019157720-8.
- with Gower, Luke; Richards, Anthony R. (January 2007). "The impact of rating changes in Australian financial markets". Pacific-Basin Finance Journal. 15 (1): 1–17. doi:10.1016/j.pacfin.2006.04.003.
- — (April 2008). "Taxing private equity". Policy Review (148): 19–33.
