= William Creighton (bishop) =

American Episcopal bishop

The Right Reverend William Creighton
- Bishop of Washington
- Church: Episcopal Church
- Diocese: Washington
- In office: 1962–1977
- Predecessor: Angus Dun
- Successor: John T. Walker
- Previous post: Coadjutor Bishop of Washington (1959-1962)

Orders
- Ordination: November 1934 by Frederick B. Bartlett
- Consecration: May 1, 1959 by Arthur C. Lichtenberger

Personal details
- Born: July 23, 1909 Philadelphia, Pennsylvania, United States
- Died: May 20, 1987 (aged 77) Washington, D.C., United States
- Buried: Washington National Cathedral
- Denomination: Anglican
- Parents: Frank W. Creighton
- Spouse: Marie-Louise Forrest Creighton
- Children: 3
- Education: University of Pennsylvania

William Forman Creighton (July 23, 1909 – May 20, 1987) was an American Episcopal bishop. He was the fifth bishop of the Diocese of Washington in the Episcopal Church in the United States of America.

== Early life ==
Creighton was born the son of Bishop Frank W. Creighton and Maud R. (Hawk) Creighton. He graduated from the University of Pennsylvania where he was a member of Sigma Pi fraternity in 1931. He graduated from Philadelphia Divinity School in 1934.

== Early ministry ==
He was ordained deacon by his father Frank W. Creighton in April 1934 and priest by Bishop Frederick B. Bartlett in November 1934. After being ordained his first assignment was at St. Mark's church in Oakes, North Dakota After three years there he moved to St. Clement's church in St. Paul, Minnesota. He was then a Navy chaplain during World War II. After the war he was assigned to St. John's church in Bethesda, Maryland.

== Bishop ==
In 1958, Bishop Angus Dun knew that he would be retiring in several years and called for the election of a Bishop Coadjutor. John Bowen Coburn was selected during the first election but he turned down the position. On the second election Creighton was selected over William G. Pollard. Creighton would serve as Bishop Coadjutor until 1962.

Creighton was respected for his theological and intellectual acumen. In the 1962 heresy hearing of Bishop James Pike he wrote the minority opinion while his superior, Bishop Dun, wrote the majority opinion. He would become bishop of the diocese later that year.

On November 25, 1963 he represented presiding bishop, the Rt. Rev. Arthur C. Lichtenberger, in the funeral procession President John F. Kennedy.

Throughout the 1960s he worked with other religious leaders to overcome racial tensions. He was criticized by some for being a member of several institutions that excluded blacks. He would eventually resign from them.

Creighton was an early supporter of the ordination of women into the priesthood. In 1975, he attempted to put pressure on the 1976 General Convention to approve women for the priesthood by declaring that he would not ordain anyone until it did so. There were some supporters who would not wait for the convention and ordained five women in 1975. After female priest were twice involved in celebrating the Eucharist against his wishes he put Rev. William A. Wendt on church trial for disobedience. Wendt was found guilty and censured. Creighton vowed to ordain women after the 1976 convention no matter what it decided.

== Family ==
His father, Frank W. Creighton, was the second missionary bishop of the Diocese of Mexico, sixth bishop of the Diocese of Michigan, and a suffragan bishop of the Diocese of Long Island. His son, Michael W. Creighton, was the ninth bishop of Episcopal Diocese of Central Pennsylvania.

== Retirement ==
After retiring in 1977 he continued to serve as a parish priest at St. John's church in Washington D.C. until right before his death in 1987.

His remains are interred in the Washington National Cathedral where he served.

Episcopal Church (USA) titles
Preceded by Angus Dun	Bishop of Washington; 1962–1977	Succeeded by John T. Walker
