= Michael W. Creighton =

American bishop

The Right Reverend Michael Whittington Creighton
- Bishop of Central Pennsylvania
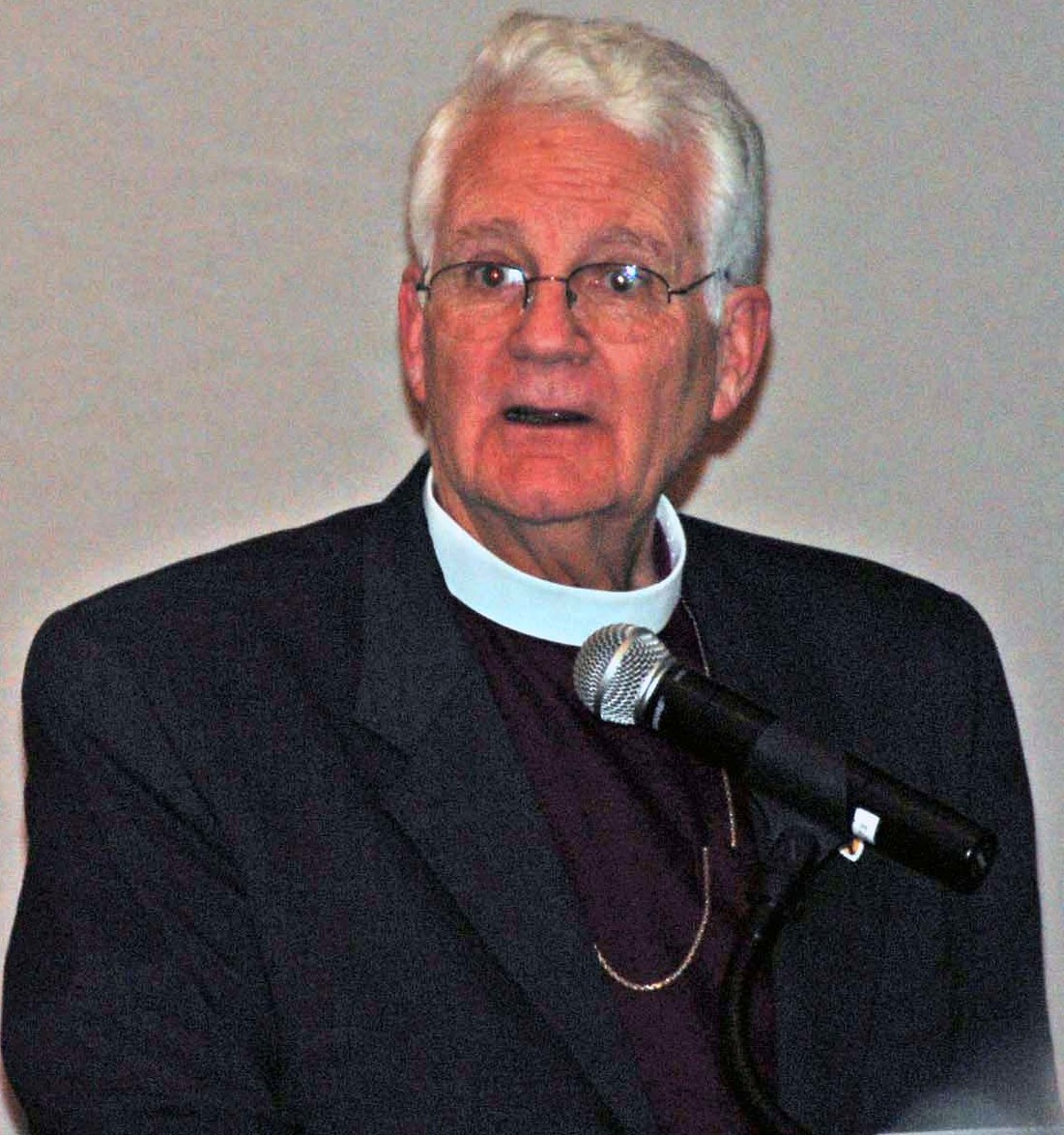
- Bishop Creighton in 2006
- Church: Episcopal Church
- Diocese: Central Pennsylvania
- Elected: June 10, 1995
- In office: 1996–2006
- Predecessor: Charlie F. McNutt
- Successor: Nathan D. Baxter
- Previous post: Coadjutor Bishop of Central Pennsylvania (1995-1996)

Orders
- Ordination: 1969
- Consecration: November 18, 1995 by Edmond L. Browning

Personal details
- Born: 1940 (age 85–86)
- Denomination: Anglican
- Parents: William Creighton & Marie-Louise Forrest Creighton
- Spouse: Betty Creighton
- Children: 2

Michael Whittington Creighton was ninth bishop of the Episcopal Diocese of Central Pennsylvania from 1996 till 2006.

== Biography ==
Creighton was born in Saint Paul, Minnesota. He received a BA degree from Trinity College, Hartford in 1962 and a M.Div. degree from Episcopal Divinity School in 1968. He served as rector of St Stephen's Church in Seattle, Washington from 1981 to 1995. Creighton is the son of Bishop William Creighton and the grandson of Bishop Frank W. Creighton. He married Elizabeth Goodridge in 1966 and they had two children.

== Bishop ==
He was elected Coadjutor Bishop of Central Pennsylvania in 1995 and consecrated on November 18, 1995 with Presiding Bishop Edmond L. Browning as primary consecrator; the consecration took place in the Founder's Hall on the campus of Milton Hershey School in Hershey, Pennsylvania. He became diocesan bishop on January 1, 1996 and retired in 2006.
