= William Steel Creighton =

American myrmecologist and taxonomist

William Steel Creighton (April 3, 1902, Philadelphia – July 23, 1973, Alexandria Bay) was an American myrmecologist and taxonomist. His work focused on ants of North America, including an extensive revision of their systematics published in 1950.

== Family ==
W. S. Creighton was the son of John Harvey Creighton and Ethel Steel Creighton.

== Academic career ==
Creighton obtained a bachelor's degree from Roanoke College in 1924, a M. S. degree from Princeton University in 1926 and a D. Sc. degree from Harvard University in 1930. While working with the entomologist Frank Eugene Lutz in 1926, he became interested in the study of ants and continued his studies under William Morton Wheeler, one of the leading authorities in myrmecology. In 1931 Creighton joined the Department of Biology at the City College of New York where he stayed until his retirement as professor emeritus in February 1962.

=== Awards ===
Creighton was awarded the Guggenheim Fellowship in 1951 and in 1952 in the field of Organismic Biology & Ecology.
