= John Lowry Cole =

Irish Conservative Party politician

John Lowry Cole MP

Member of Parliament for Enniskillen
- In office 12 February 1859 – 18 November 1868
- Preceded by: James Whiteside
- Succeeded by: John Crichton

Personal details
- Born: 8 June 1813
- Died: 28 November 1882 (aged 69)
- Party: Irish Conservative Party
- Relations: Henry Cole; William Cole
- Parent(s): John Cole; Charlotte Paget

John Lowry Cole (8 June 1813 – 28 November 1882) was an Irish Conservative Party politician in the United Kingdom of Great Britain and Ireland.

He was elected as the Member of Parliament (MP) for Enniskillen at a by-election in 1859 and held the seat until he stood down at the 1868 general election.

Cole was the son of former County Fermanagh MP John Cole, 2nd Earl of Enniskillen, and Lady Charlotte Paget, the daughter of Henry Paget, 1st Earl of Uxbridge. His brother Henry Cole was also MP for Enniskillen from 1844 to 1851, and Fermanagh from 1855 to 1880. He died unmarried in 1882.

Parliament of the United Kingdom
Preceded by James Whiteside	Member of Parliament for Enniskillen; 1859 – 1868	Succeeded by John Crichton
