= Archdall (surname) =

Archdall is a surname. Notable people with the surname include:

- Audley Archdall (1826–1893), Irish born cricketer
- Esther Archdall (1916–1999), New Zealand artist
- Henry Archdall (1886–1976), Australian academic and clergyman
- Mervyn Archdall (disambiguation)

The family name can also be spelled Archdale.
