= Sir Gustavus Hume, 3rd Baronet =

17th-century Irish baronet

Sir Gustavus Hume, 3rd Baronet, of Castle Hume, (c.1670 – 25 October 1731) was an Irish landowner and politician.

Hume was the son of Sir John Hume, 2nd Baronet and Sydney Hamilton, and in 1695 he succeeded to his father's baronetcy. He was High Sheriff of Fermanagh in 1701. He was the Member of Parliament for County Fermanagh in the Irish House of Commons between 1713 and his death in 1731. In 1714 he was made a member of the Privy Council of Ireland. From 1715 to 1727 he was a Groom of the Chamber to George I of Great Britain. Hume was succeeded in his title by his cousin, Charles Hume.

Hume's daughter Alice, married George Rochfort, the son of George Rochfort, and their son Gustavus Hume Rochfort was a Member of Parliament for County Westmeath.

Parliament of Ireland
Preceded by James Corry; Christopher Irwin	Member of Parliament for County Fermanagh; 1713-1731; With: James Corry (1713-1719); John Corry (1719-1726); Richard Cole (1726-1731)	Succeeded by Richard Cole; Henry Brooke
Baronetage of Nova Scotia
Preceded by John Hume	Baronet (of North Berwick); 1695-1731	Succeeded by Charles Hume
