= Mervyn Archdall =

Mervyn Archdall may refer to:

- Mervyn Archdall (Irish antiquary) (1723–1791)
- Mervyn Archdall (senior) (c. 1724–1813), colonel and MP for Fermanagh
- Mervyn Archdall (junior) (1763–1839), general and MP for Fermanagh
- Mervyn Edward Archdale (1812–1895), High Sheriff (1879) and MP for Fermanagh
- Mervyn Archdall (bishop) (1831–1913), Bishop of Killaloe and Clonfert
