= Mervyn Edward Archdale =

Irish politician

Mervyn Edward Archdale DL (27 January 1812 – 22 December 1895) (known as Mervyn Edward Archdall until 1875), was an Irish soldier, High Sheriff and MP.

He was born the eldest son of Edward Archdall of Riversdale, County Fermanagh, who had been Sheriff of Fermanagh in 1813. He was educated at private schools in England and Brasenose College, Oxford, where he matriculated in 1830 but did not graduate.

He joined the 6th (Inniskilling) Dragoons, becoming a cornet in 1832, a lieutenant in 1835 and a captain in 1841. He retired on half pay in 1847.

In 1834 was elected the member of parliament for County Fermanagh following the retirement of his uncle Mervyn Archdall. He was returned unopposed in the following nine elections, sitting until 1874. He was appointed High Sheriff of Fermanagh for 1879.

In 1857 he inherited the family seat of Castle Archdale and Trillick in County Tyrone from his uncle William Archdall. He was a noted member of the Orange Order and became treasurer of the grand lodge of Ireland. He also kept racehorses.

He died in 1895 at Cannes in the south of France. He had married Emma Inez, the daughter of Jacob Goulding of Kew, Surrey, with whom he had two sons, Mervyn Henry and Hugh James and three daughters. His estates passed to his brother, William Humphrys Archdale, who also took over the representation of Fermanagh in Parliament.

Parliament of the United Kingdom
Preceded by Mervyn Archdall; Viscount Cole	Member of Parliament for County Fermanagh; 1834 – 1874; With: Viscount Cole to 1840; Arthur Brooke 1840–54; Henry Cole from 1854	Succeeded by Henry Cole; William Humphrys Archdale
