= John Corry =

Irish politician (1667–1726)

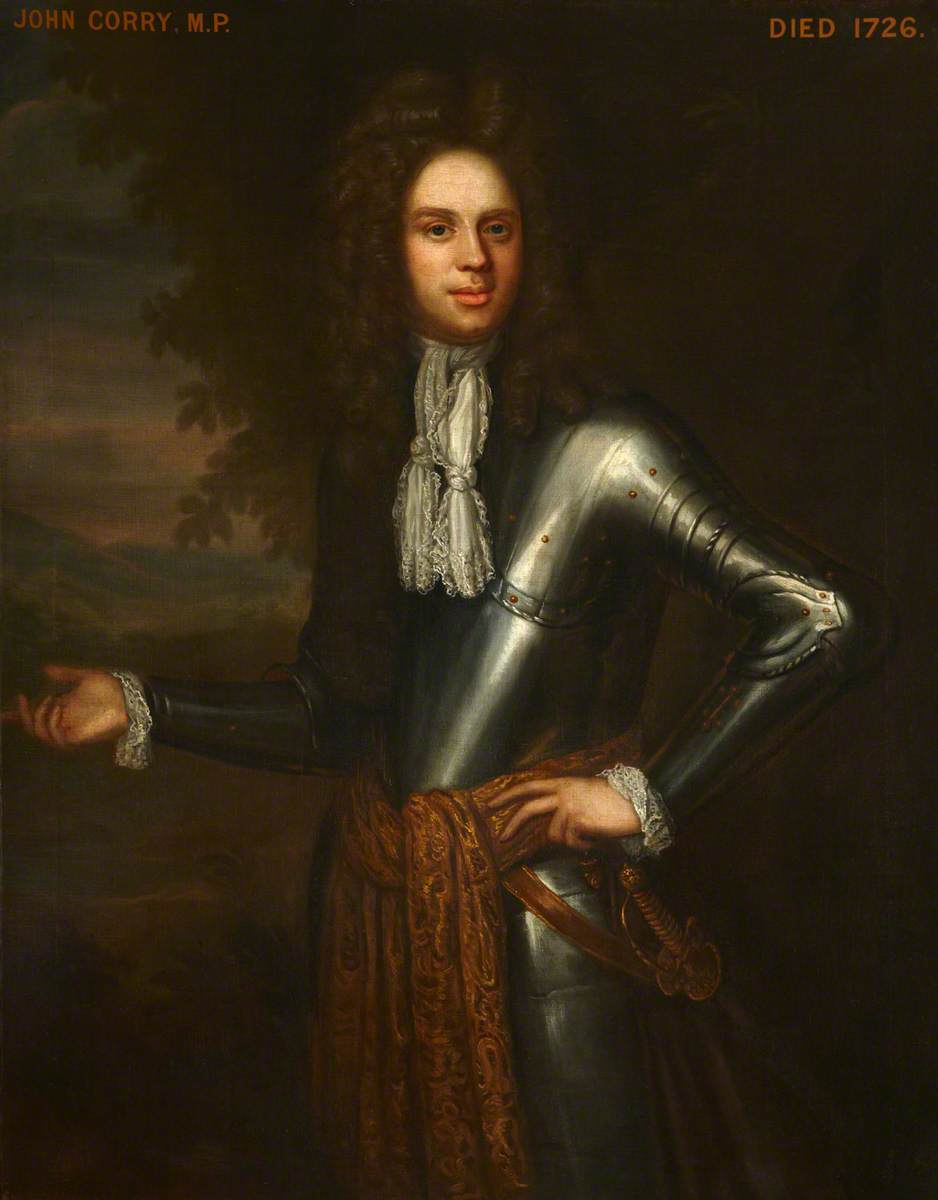
- Colonel John Corry, MP, by Thomas Pooley

Member of the Parliament of Ireland for Enniskillen
- In office 1711–1713

Member of the Parliament of Ireland for County Fermanagh
- In office 1719–1726

Personal details
- Born: 8 January 1667 Ireland, United Kingdom
- Died: 11 November 1726 (aged 59) Ireland, United Kingdom
- Education: Kilkenny College; Trinity College Dublin
- Occupation: Politician

Colonel John Corry (8 January 1667 – 11 November 1726) was an Irish politician.

He was the son of Colonel James Corry and his first wife Sarah Anketill, daughter of Captain Oliver Anketill. Corry was educated at Kilkenny College and Trinity College Dublin. Corry became High Sheriff of Fermanagh in 1711. In the same year, he contested successfully a by-election for Enniskillen and was a member of the Irish House of Commons until 1713. In 1719, Corry was returned for County Fermanagh, the same constituency his father had represented before, and held that position until his death in 1726.

On 7 February 1702, he married Sarah Leslie, daughter of William Leslie. They had four daughters and four sons. His only surviving son Leslie was a Member of Parliament for Killybegs.

Parliament of Ireland
| Preceded by John Cole; Sir Michael Cole | Member of Parliament for Enniskillen; 1711–1713; With: John Cole | Succeeded by John Cole; Richard Cole |
| Preceded by Sir Gustavus Hume, 3rd Bt; James Corry | Member of Parliament for County Fermanagh; 1719–1726; With: Sir Gustavus Hume, 3rd Bt | Succeeded by Sir Gustavus Hume, 3rd Bt; Henry Brooke |
