= Archdale (surname) =

Archdale is a surname. Notable people with the surname include:

- Alexander Archdale (1905–1986), British actor and theater producer
- Betty Archdale (1907–2000), English-Australian educator and cricketer
- Sir Edward Archdale, 1st Baronet (1853–1943), MP for North Fermanagh 1898–1903 and 1916–1921
- Sir Edward Archdale, 3rd Baronet (1921–2009), Royal Navy officer
- Helen Archdale (1876–1949), Scottish feminist, suffragette and journalist
- John Archdale (1642–1717), colonial Governor of North Carolina and Governor of South Carolina
- Mervyn Edward Archdale (1812–1895), Irish politician
- William Humphrys Archdale, Irish politician

The surname can also be spelled Archdall
