= Archdale =

Archdale may refer to:

- Archdale, North Carolina, United States, a city
- Archdale (LYNX station), a light rail station in Charlotte, North Carolina
- Archdale baronets, a title in the Baronetage of the United Kingdom
- Archdale (surname)
- Archdale Parkhill (1878-1947), Australian politician
- a hamlet in Easton, New York
