= Henry Brooke (Irish politician) =

Irish politician (1671–1761)

Henry Brooke (January 1671 – 14 July 1761) was an Irish politician.

He was the son of Thomas Brooke, grandson of Sir Basil Brooke, 1st Baronet, and his wife Catherine Cole, daughter of Sir John Cole, 1st Baronet. In 1709, he was appointed High Sheriff of Fermanagh and Governor of County Fermanagh. Between 1713 and 1727, he sat for Dundalk in the Irish House of Commons. Subsequently, he was returned for County Fermanagh until his death in 1761.

On 29 March 1711, he married Lettice Burton, daughter of Benjamin Burton. They had four daughters and two sons. His oldest son Arthur represented Fermanagh and Maryborough and was later created a baronet.

Parliament of Ireland
Preceded by Henry Bellingham; Richard Tisdall	Member of Parliament for Dundalk; 1713–1727; With: Henry Bellingham 1713–1715; James Hamilton 1715–1719; Henry Morrison 1719–1721; James Tisdall 1721–1727	Succeeded by Thomas Fortescue; Hans Hamilton
Preceded by Richard Cole; Sir Gustavus Hume, 3rd Bt	Member of Parliament for County Fermanagh; 1727–1761; With: Richard Cole 1727–1731; Nicholas Archdall 1731–1761	Succeeded by Mervyn Archdall; Arthur Brooke
