= Audley Archdall =

Personal information
- Full name: Audley Mervyn Archdall
- Born: 6 June 1825 (Note: Some sources give Archdall's year of birth as 1825, some as 1826.); Ballycassidy, County Fermanagh, Ireland
- Died: 27 February 1893 (aged 67); Newent, Gloucestershire, England

Domestic team information
- Years: Team
- 1851: Gentlemen of Kent
- FC debut: 30 June 1851 Gentlemen of Kent v Gentlemen of England

Career statistics
Competition	First-class
Matches	1
Runs scored	0
Batting average	0
100s/50s	0/0
Top score	0
Catches/stumpings	0/–
- Source: CricInfo, 18 October 2008

Audley Mervyn Archdall or Archdale (6 June 1825 – 27 February 1893) was an Irish amateur cricketer. He was born at Riversdale House near Ballycassidy in County Fermanagh in 1826 and educated at King William's College on the Isle of Man. Archdall's father was Edward Archdale, a Justice of the Peace (JP) and Deputy Lieutenant who had been High Sheriff of Fermanagh and had built Riversdale House close to the Archdale family seat, Castle Archdale.

Archdall served in the Royal Artillery (RA). He was commissioned as a second lieutenant in December 1844 and rose to the rank of captain by the time he left the army in 1855.

Archdall made his sole first-class cricket appearance for the Gentlemen of Kent against the Gentlemen of England in 1851 whilst he was serving with the RA. He is also known to have played non-first-class cricket for Royal Artillery Cricket Club, I Zingari and the Gentlemen of Devon.

Archdall married Sybilla Miles in 1854 and lived at Ledbury in Herefordshire, serving as a JP for the county. The couple had five children. He reverted to the spelling of his surname as Archdale in around 1875. Archdall died at Newent in Gloucestershire in February 1893 aged 67.
