= Charles Hume =

Charles Hume may refer to:

- C. W. Hume (Charles Westley Hume, 1886–1981), British animal welfare worker and writer
- Sir Charles Hume, 4th Baronet (died c. 1750)

== See also ==
- Charles Hulme, British psychologist and academic
