= County Fermanagh (Parliament of Ireland constituency) =

Pre-1801 Irish constituency

Coordinates: 54.451°N 7.713°W

- Former county constituency for the Irish House of Commons
- County: County Fermanagh

–1801
- Seats: 2
- Replaced by: County Fermanagh

County Fermanagh was a constituency represented in the Irish House of Commons until 1800.

== History ==
In the Patriot Parliament of 1689 summoned by James II, Fermanagh was not represented.

== Members of Parliament ==
=== 1613–1801 ===
Election	First MP	Second MP
1613	Sir Henry Folliott	Sir John Davies Speaker
1634	Sir William Cole	Sir John Hume
1639	Rory Maguire, expelled 1642	Sir William Cole
1661	Sir John Cole, 1st Baronet	William Davys, died and repl. 1662 by Henry Blennerhassett
1689	Fermanagh was not represented in the Patriot Parliament	
1692	James Corry	Abraham Creighton
1695	James Corry	Christopher Irwin
1713	James Corry	Sir Gustavus Hume, 3rd Bt
1719	John Corry	Sir Gustavus Hume, 3rd Bt
1726	Richard Cole	Sir Gustavus Hume, 3rd Bt
1727	Richard Cole	Henry Brooke
1731	Nicholas Archdall	Henry Brooke
1761	Mervyn Archdall	Arthur Brooke (Note: Created a baronet in 1764)
1783	Mervyn Archdall	Arthur Cole-Hamilton
1790	Mervyn Archdall	Viscount Cole
1801	Succeeded by the Westminster constituency County Fermanagh	

== Bibliography ==
- O'Hart, John (2007). The Irish and Anglo-Irish Landed Gentry: When Cromwell came to Ireland. Vol. II. Heritage Books. ISBN 0-7884-1927-7.
- Leigh Rayment's historical List of Members of the Irish House of Commons. Cites: Johnston-Liik, Edith Mary (2002). The History of the Irish Parliament 1692-1800 (6 volumes). Ulster Historical Foundation.
