= Victor Brooke =

Anglo-Irish naturalist and baronet

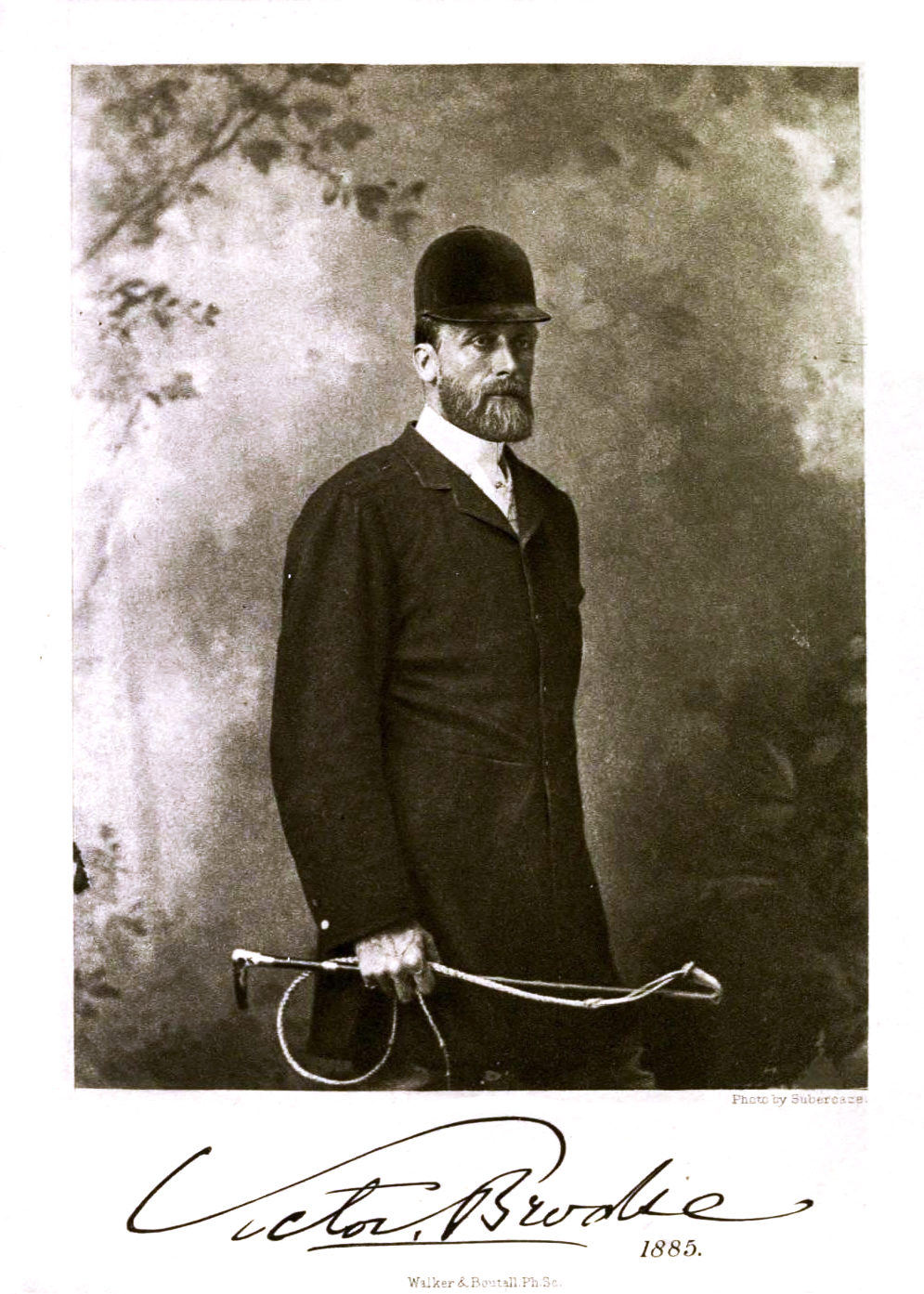

Sir Victor Alexander Brooke, 3rd Baronet (5 January 1843 – 23 November 1891), was an Anglo-Irish sportsman-naturalist and baronet. He was the father of Field Marshal The 1st Viscount Alanbrooke, and grandfather of The 1st Viscount Brookeborough, Prime Minister of Northern Ireland. He shot and collected game trophies from around the world, took a special interest in deer and antelope species and published the first scientific description of the Persian fallow deer as a new species in 1875.

== Life ==
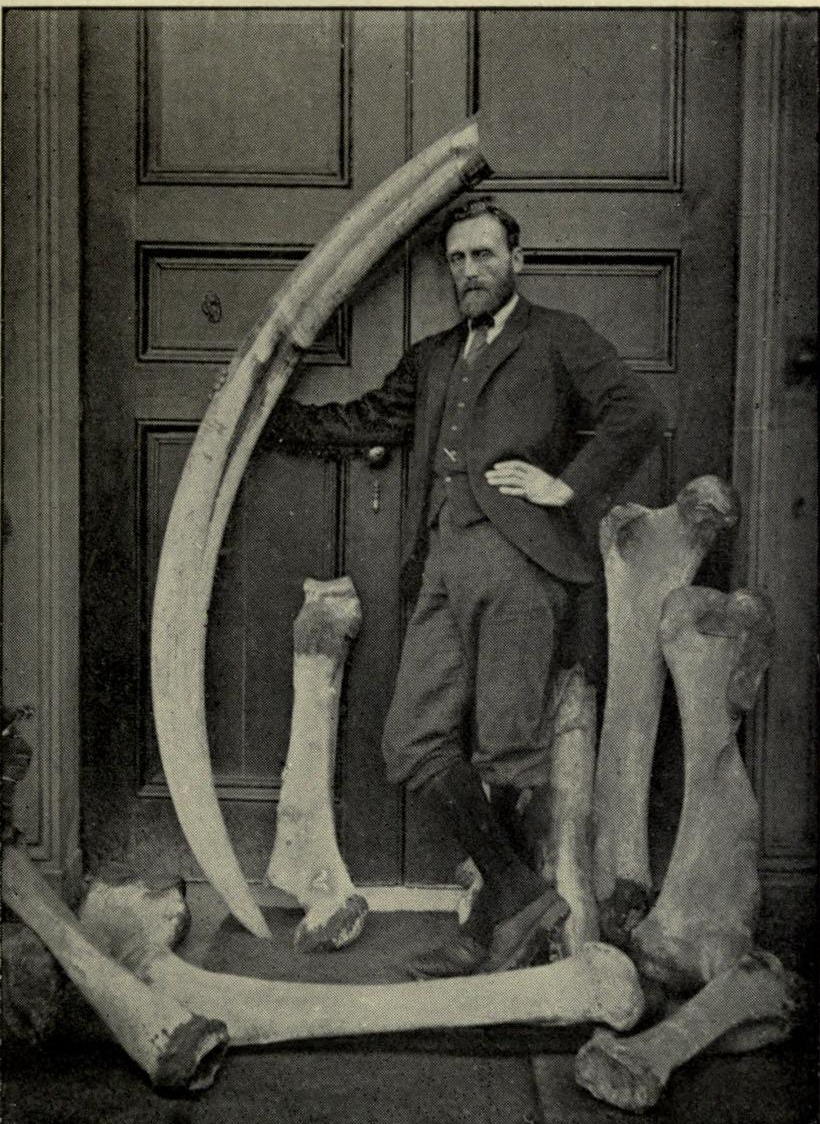
With tusk of an elephant shot in the Biligirirangans on 30 July 1863 along with Col. Douglas Hamilton. It has been considered the largest elephant ever shot in India.

Brooke was born at Colebrooke Estate, County Fermanagh, the son of Sir Arthur Brooke, 2nd Baronet, an Ulster aristocrat and his wife Julia Henrietta née Anson in the north of Ireland and succeeded to his title and the Colebrooke Estate in 1854. His mother had been maid of honour to the Queen who acted as his Godmother. At the age of ten, his father died and he was taken care of by his uncle George Brooke. The estate was stocked with fallow deer and Brooke added Irish red and Japanese deer in 1870. He took to sport shooting at an early age and trained in horsemanship under Jim Mason. Along with his brother Harry he often went to Castle Caldwell, belonging to a cousin, John Bloomfield, for game shooting. He studied at Harrow and then traveled abroad, being a keen sportsman who enjoyed big game hunting. His hunting trips took him into the Pyrenees, the middle-east, and India. He was in touch with naturalists from around the world and was a Fellow of the Zoological Society. William Flower was first introduced to him in India by Edward Blyth in 1870 and wrote on Brooke's contributions to natural history. Brooke attended the meeting of the British Association for the Advancement of Science at Dublin in 1878.

Brooke described the Persian fallow deer in 1875 as a new species. Brooke's proposed work on antelopes remained unfinished at his death. The plates by Joseph Smit and Joseph Wolf were later reused in Philip Sclater and Oldfield Thomas's The Book of Antelopes (1894–1900).

He was a magistrate, deputy lieutenant and Sheriff of Fermanagh.

== Personal life ==
Brooke married Alice Sophia, daughter of Sir Alan Edward Bellingham, 3rd Baronet, whom he met at a party, in 1864. After their marriage they settled at a villa in Pau, France, where they had at least six children. The youngest was Alan - later Field Marshal The 1st Viscount Alanbrooke. Another son served in India as a military secretary to The 4th Earl of Minto, Victor Reginald Brooke (1873-1914), and took a keen interest in hunting. One grandson was The 1st Viscount Brookeborough, the third Prime Minister of Northern Ireland.

Brooke died of pneumonia in Pau in November 1891, aged 48, and was succeeded in the baronetcy by his eldest son, Arthur. Lady Brooke died in July 1920.

Baronetage of the United Kingdom
Preceded by Arthur Brinsley Brooke	Baronet (of Colebrooke); 1854–1891	Succeeded by Arthur Douglas Brooke
