= James Corry (Irish politician) =

Irish politician (1634–1718)

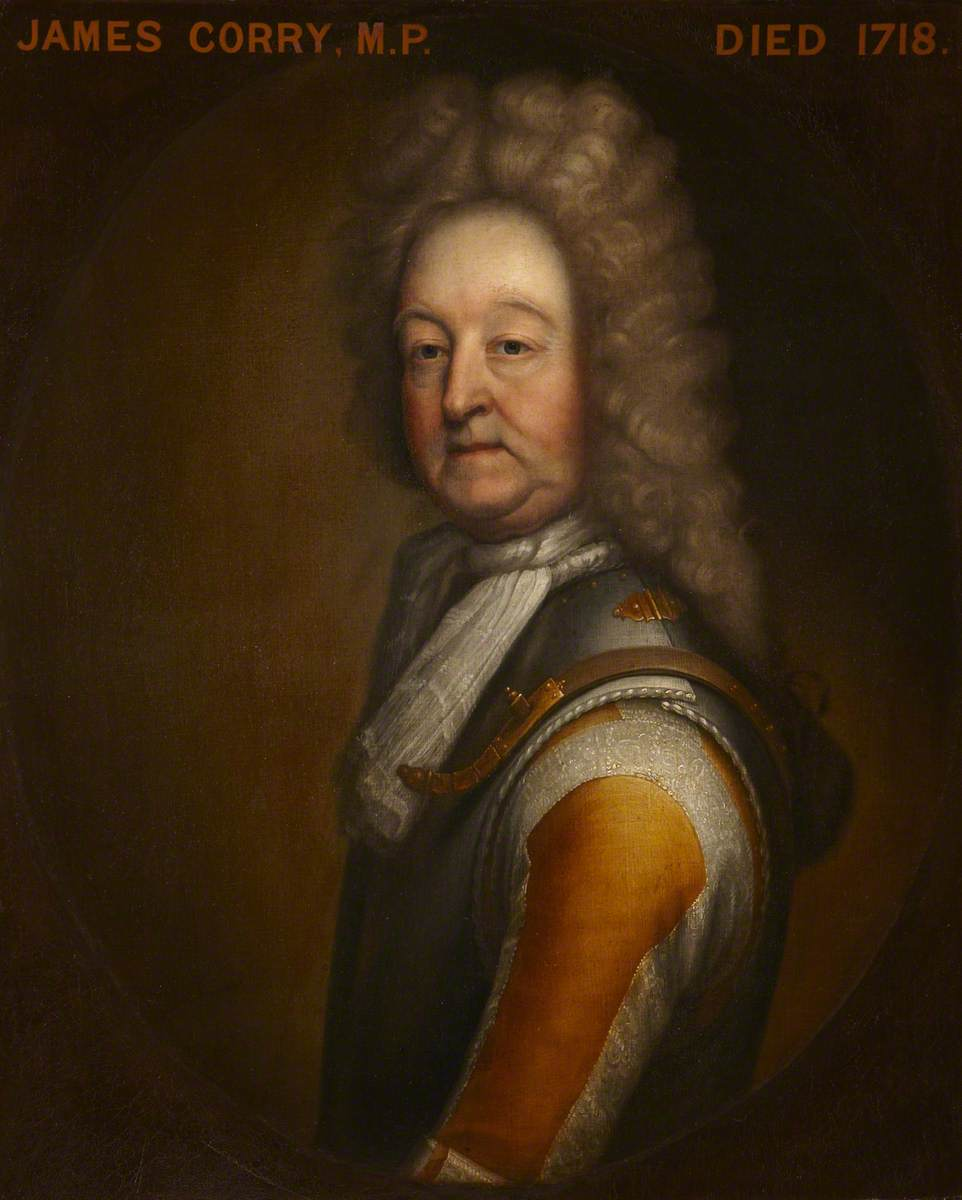
Colonel James Corry, by Thomas Pooley

Colonel James Corry (1634 – 1 May 1718) was an Irish politician and soldier.

He was the son of John Corry and his wife Blanch Johnston, and originated initially from Dumfries in Scotland. His father, having been a merchant, moved to Ireland in 1641 and settled first in Belfast, then in Fermanagh from 1656. In 1666, Corry was appointed captain of the Fermanagh Militia by the Duke of Ormonde and became its colonel in 1689.

Corry was High Sheriff of Fermanagh in 1671 and High Sheriff of Monaghan in 1677. In the Glorious Revolution of 1688, he was accused to support King James II of England, however already in the following year his loyalty to King William III of England was confirmed and he was acquitted. Corry was elected a Member of Parliament for County Fermanagh in 1692, and represented the constituency until his death in 1718. Having been already a deputy from 1697, he was appointed Governor of Fermanagh in 1705.

In February 1663, he married firstly, Sarah Anketill, daughter of Captain Oliver Anketill. She gave birth to three daughters and a son, John. Sarah died in 1683, and Corry married secondly Lucy Mervyn, daughter of Henry Mervyn in the same year. Their only child, a daughter, died as an infant and Lucy herself some years later. In 1691, Corry married thirdly Elizabeth Harryman. Their marriage was childless and they were divorced in 1696.

Parliament of Ireland
| Unknown | Member of Parliament for County Fermanagh; 1692–1718; With: Abraham Creighton 1692–1695; Christopher Irwin 1695–1713; Sir Gustavus Hume, 3rd Bt 1713–1718 | Succeeded by Sir Gustavus Hume, 3rd Bt; John Corry |
