= William Humphrys Archdale =

Irish politician, also known as Archdall

William Humphrys Archdall (6 June 1813 - 23 June 1899), also known as Archdale, was an Irish Conservative politician who sat in the House of Commons from 1874 to 1885.

Archdall was the son of Edward Archdall of Riversdale and Castle Archdale and his wife Matilda Humphrys, daughter of William Humphrys of Ballyhaise Cavan. He was educated at Tamworth and Exeter College, Oxford and in 1835 was admitted to Lincoln's Inn. He was a J.P. and Deputy Lieutenant for Fermanagh and was High Sheriff of Fermanagh in 1845. He was also J.P. for County Tyrone and was High Sheriff of Tyrone in 1861. In 1864 he inherited the Riversdale estate on the death of his father.

At the 1874 general election Archdall succeeded his brother Mervyn Edward Archdale as Member of Parliament for County Fermanagh. He held the seat until 1885.

On 22 December 1895, Archdall succeeded his brother as head of the Archdale family and in 1896 he changed his name by Royal Licence to William Humphrys Mervyn Archdale in accordance with the will of his uncle General Mervyn Archdall.

Archdall married Emily Mary Maude, daughter of Rev. John Charles Maude in 1845. He married secondly, in 1894, Matilda Mary Alley, daughter of William Alley.

== Arms ==
Coat of arms of William Humphrys Archdale

Notes
Granted 30 September 1896 by Arthur Edward Vicars, Ulster King of Arms.
Crest
Out of a ducal crest-coronet Or an heraldic Tyger's head Argent maned tufted and armed Sable.
Escutcheon
Quarterly 1st & 4th Azure a chevron Ermine between three talbots passant Or (Archdall) 2nd Or a chevron Sable (Mervyn) 3rd qrandquarterly 1st & 4th Azure three fleurs-de-lis Or 2nd & 3rd Gules three gem-rings Gold all within a bordure Or charged with a tressure flory Gules in the centre point an inescutcheon Argent charged with a tilting spear and a sword saltireways points upward Proper (Montgomery).
Motto
Data Fata Secuta

Parliament of the United Kingdom
| Preceded by Mervyn Edward Archdale; Henry Cole | Member of Parliament for County Fermanagh; 1874 – 1885; With: Henry Cole to 1880; Viscount Crichton from 1880 | constituency divided See North Fermanagh and South Fermanagh |
