= Henry Cole (Conservative politician) =

Anglo-Irish politician, cricketer and army officer

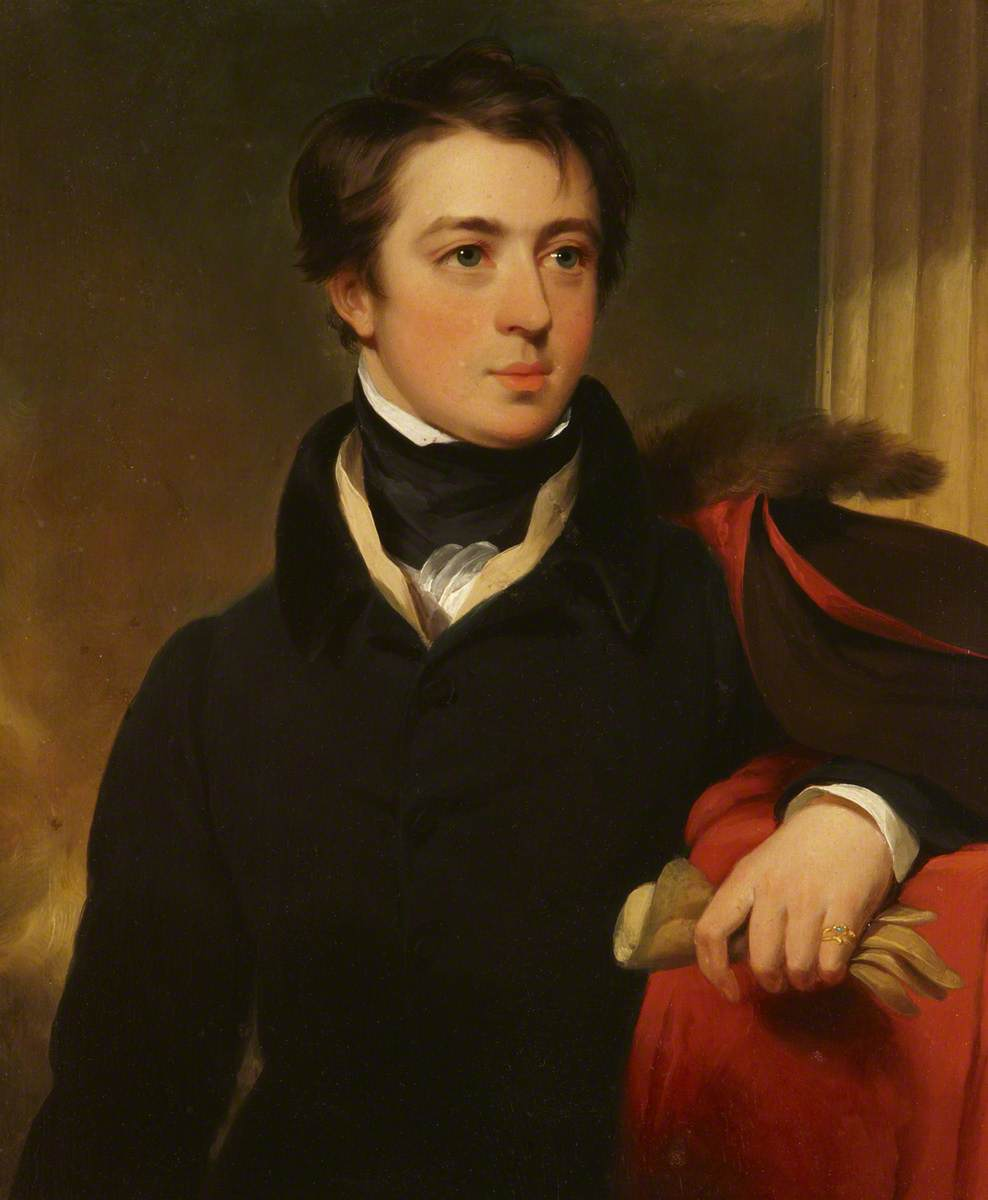
Portrait by William Robinson, c. 1830

Colonel Henry Arthur Cole (14 February 1809 – 2 July 1890) was an Anglo-Irish politician, cricketer and army officer.

== Life ==
Cole was the second son of John Cole, 2nd Earl of Enniskillen. He succeeded his uncle Arthur Henry Cole to be elected as a Conservative Member of Parliament for Enniskillen on 18 June 1844, resigning on 31 March 1851 through his appointment as Steward of the Chiltern Hundreds. He was appointed High Sheriff of Fermanagh for 1854.

He died in Willesden on 2 July 1890.

Parliament of the United Kingdom
Preceded by Arthur Henry Cole	Member of Parliament for Enniskillen; 1844–1851	Succeeded by James Whiteside
Preceded by Mervyn Edward Archdale; Sir Arthur Brooke	Member of Parliament for County Fermanagh; 1854–1880; With: Mervyn Edward Archdale 1854–1874; William Humphrys Archdale 1874–1880	Succeeded by William Humphrys Archdale; Viscount Crichton
