= Enniskillen (UK Parliament constituency) =

Parliamentary constituency in the United Kingdom, 1801–1885

- Former borough constituency for the House of Commons
- County: County Fermanagh
- Borough: Enniskillen

1801–1885
- Seats: 1
- Created from: Enniskillen
- Replaced by: North Fermanagh

Enniskillen was a United Kingdom Parliament constituency in Ireland, returning one MP. It was an original constituency represented in Parliament when the Union of Great Britain and Ireland took effect on 1 January 1801.

It was disfranchised under the Redistribution of Seats Act 1885, which took effect at the 1885 general election.

== Boundaries ==
This constituency was the parliamentary borough of Enniskillen in County Fermanagh. In January 1832, boundary commissioners proposed new boundaries for the borough, which were not influenced by the old limits, as they were not connected to the elective franchise. It was defined by the Parliamentary Boundaries (Ireland) Act 1832 as:

The Island of Enniskillen, and also the Spaces included between Lough Erne and the Two following Boundaries, respectively denominated East and West:

East.—From the Westernmost Point of the Townland of Toneystick in a straight Line to the salient Point of the North-western Bastion of the East Fort; thence in a straight Line to the salient Point of the North-eastern Bastion of the same; thence in a straight Line, in the Direction of the South-western Angle of the County Infirmary, to the Point at which such straight Line cuts the Boundary of the Townland of. Toneystick; thence, Southward, along the Boundary of the Townland of Toneystick to the Point at which the same meets Lough Erne.

West.—From the Point at which the Boundary between the Townlands of Cole's Hill and Windmill Hill meets Lough Erne, Westward, along the said Boundary to a Point which is distant One hundred Yards (measured along such Boundary) beyond the Point where that Boundary crosses the Florence Court Road; hence in a straight Line to the salient Angle of the South-western Bastion of the West Fort; thence in a straight Line to the Point at which the Boundary between the Townlands of Windmill Hill and Portora meets the Eastern Bank of Lough Galliagh; thence, Northward, along the Eastern Bank of Lough Galliagh to the Point at which the same meets the Church Hill Road; thence, towards the Town, along the last-mentioned Road to the Lodge Gate of Portora School; thence along a Hedge which runs at the Foot of the Lawn of Portora School, Northward, Lough Erne, to the Point at which the same meets Loughurne.

== Members of Parliament ==
Election	Member	Party	Note
1 January 1801	Hon. Arthur Cole Hamilton	Tory	1801: Co-opted
31 July 1802	Rt Hon. John Beresford	Tory	Also returned by and elected to sit for County Waterford
24 December 1802	William Burroughs	Tory	Appointed a Judge of the Supreme Court in Bengal
14 March 1806	John King	Tory	Resigned
3 July 1806	William Fremantle	Tory	
20 November 1806	Nathaniel Sneyd	Tory	Also returned by and elected to sit for County Cavan
14 January 1807	Richard Henry Alexander Bennet	Tory	
14 May 1807	Charles Pochin	Tory	
26 October 1812	Richard Magenis	Tory	Resigned
11 February 1828	Hon. Arthur Henry Cole	Tory	Re-elected as a Conservative candidate
December 1834	Hon. Arthur Henry Cole	Conservative	Resigned
18 June 1844	Hon. Henry Cole	Conservative	Resigned
12 April 1851	James Whiteside	Conservative	Resigned to contest Dublin University
21 February 1859	Hon. John Lowry Cole	Conservative	
18 November 1868	Viscount Crichton	Conservative	
2 April 1880	Viscount Cole	Conservative	Last MP for the constituency
1885	Constituency abolished		

== Elections ==
=== Elections in the 1830s ===
General election 1830: Enniskillen
Party	Candidate	Votes	%
Tory	Arthur Henry Cole	Unopposed	
Registered electors		15	
Tory hold			

General election 1831: Enniskillen
Party	Candidate	Votes	%
Tory	Arthur Henry Cole	Unopposed	
Registered electors		15	
Tory hold			

General election 1832: Enniskillen
Party	Candidate	Votes	%
Tory	Arthur Henry Cole	Unopposed	
Registered electors		212	
Tory hold			

General election 1835: Enniskillen
Party	Candidate	Votes	%
Conservative	Arthur Henry Cole	Unopposed	
Registered electors		228	
Conservative hold			

General election 1837: Enniskillen
Party	Candidate	Votes	%
Conservative	Arthur Henry Cole	Unopposed	
Registered electors		296	
Conservative hold			

=== Elections in the 1840s ===
General election 1841: Enniskillen
Party	Candidate	Votes	%	±%
Conservative	Arthur Henry Cole	Unopposed		
Registered electors		181		
Conservative hold				

Cole resigned by accepting the office of Steward of the Chiltern Hundreds, causing a by-election.

By-election, 18 June 1844: Enniskillen
Party	Candidate	Votes	%	±%
Conservative	Henry Cole	Unopposed		
Conservative hold				

General election 1847: Enniskillen
Party	Candidate	Votes	%	±%
Conservative	Henry Cole	Unopposed		
Registered electors		273		
Conservative hold				

=== Elections in the 1850s ===
Cole resigned by accepting the office of Steward of the Chiltern Hundreds, causing a by-election.

By-election, 12 April 1851: Enniskillen
Party	Candidate	Votes	%	±%
Conservative	James Whiteside	85	55.6	N/A
Conservative	John Collum	68	44.4	N/A
Majority		17	11.2	N/A
Turnout		153	89.0	N/A
Registered electors		172		
Conservative hold		Swing	N/A	

Whiteside was appointed Solicitor-General for Ireland, requiring a by-election.

By-election, 9 March 1852: Enniskillen
Party	Candidate	Votes	%	±%
Conservative	James Whiteside	81	52.9	N/A
Conservative	John Collum	72	47.1	N/A
Majority		9	5.8	N/A
Turnout		153	89.0	N/A
Registered electors		172		
Conservative hold		Swing	N/A	

General election 1852: Enniskillen
Party	Candidate	Votes	%	±%
Conservative	James Whiteside	Unopposed		
Registered electors		172		
Conservative hold				

General election 1857: Enniskillen
Party	Candidate	Votes	%	±%
Conservative	James Whiteside	Unopposed		
Registered electors		221		
Conservative hold				

Whiteside was appointed Attorney-General for Ireland, requiring a by-election.

By-election, 9 March 1858: Enniskillen
Party	Candidate	Votes	%	±%
Conservative	James Whiteside	Unopposed		
Conservative hold				

In order to contest the 1859 by-election in the Dublin University, Whiteside resigned by accepting the office of Steward of the Manor of Hempholme, causing a by-election.

By-election, 21 February 1859: Enniskillen
Party	Candidate	Votes	%	±%
Conservative	John Lowry Cole	107	50.5	N/A
Conservative	John Collum	71	33.5	N/A
Conservative	Paul Dane	34	16.0	N/A
Majority		36	17.0	N/A
Turnout		212	90.6	N/A
Registered electors		234		
Conservative hold		Swing	N/A	

General election 1859: Enniskillen
Party	Candidate	Votes	%	±%
Conservative	John Lowry Cole	Unopposed		
Registered electors		234		
Conservative hold				

=== Elections in the 1860s ===
General election 1865: Enniskillen
Party	Candidate	Votes	%	±%
Conservative	John Lowry Cole	117	51.5	N/A
Liberal	John Collum	107	47.1	New
Conservative	Arthur Lowry Cole	3	1.3	N/A
Majority		10	4.4	N/A
Turnout		227	86.0	N/A
Registered electors		264		
Conservative hold		Swing	N/A	

General election 1868: Enniskillen
Party	Candidate	Votes	%	±%
Conservative	John Crichton	171	54.1	+2.6
Liberal	John Collum	141	44.6	−0.5
Conservative	Charles Frederick Crichton	3	0.9	N/A
Conservative	Arthur Lowry Cole	1	0.3	−1.0
Majority		30	9.5	+5.1
Turnout		316	92.7	+6.7
Registered electors		341		
Conservative hold		Swing	+1.6	

=== Elections in the 1870s ===
General election 1874: Enniskillen
Party	Candidate	Votes	%	±%
Conservative	John Crichton	192	52.7	−1.4
Liberal	Lucius John Collum	172	47.3	+2.7
Majority		20	5.4	−4.1
Turnout		364	92.6	−0.1
Registered electors		393		
Conservative hold		Swing	−2.1	

Crichton was appointed a lord of the Treasury, causing a by-election.

By-election, 15 Feb 1876: Enniskillen
Party	Candidate	Votes	%	±%
Conservative	John Crichton	Unopposed		
Registered electors		385		
Conservative hold				

=== Elections in the 1880s ===
General election 1880: Enniskillen
Party	Candidate	Votes	%	±%
Conservative	Lowry Cole	198	52.7	0.0
Liberal	William Collum	178	47.3	0.0
Majority		20	5.4	0.0
Turnout		376	90.4	−2.2
Registered electors		416		
Conservative hold		Swing	0.0	
