= Douglas Hamilton =

British army officer (1818–1892)

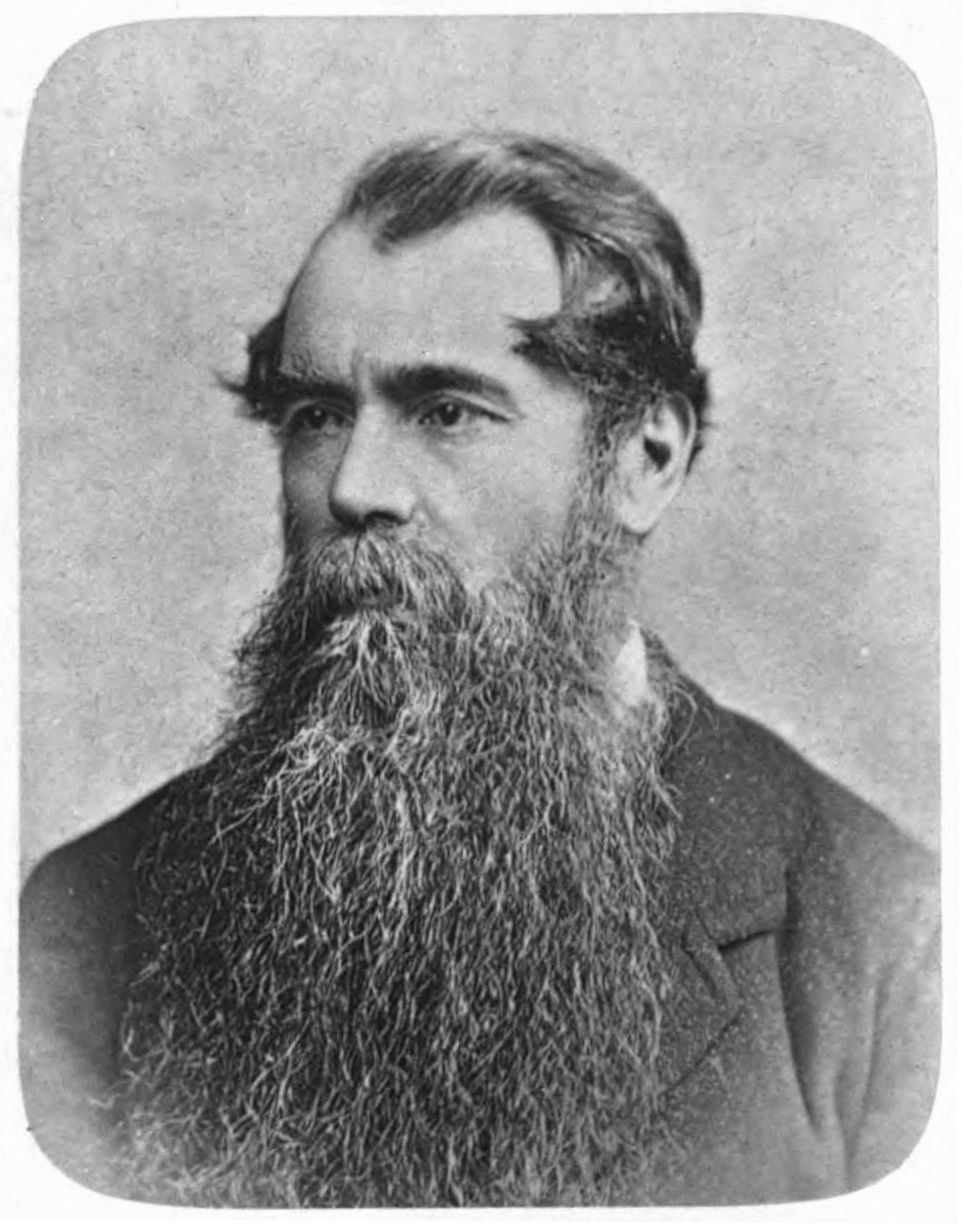
- Major-General Douglas Hamilton in 1870
- Born: 8 April 1818
- Died: 20 January 1892 (aged 73)

General Douglas Hamilton (8 April 1818 – 20 January 1892) was a British Indian Army officer, gazetted to the 21st Regiment of the Madras Native Infantry from 1837 to 1871. He was a well known surveyor of the early British hill stations in South India and a famous sportsman, shikari, big-game hunter and trophy collector. He was an acute observer of nature and a gentleman. He legitimately shot more game in the Nilgiri Hills than any other sportsman.

== Family ==
Hamilton was born on 8 April 1818, and educated at Harrow School. He was the youngest of eight sons of Charles Hamilton esq. of Sudbury Grove house, Middlesex - not far from Harrow on the Hill - and of Kensworth House, Hertfordshire. His father was employed at the War Office and died on 28 June 1834 aged 56.

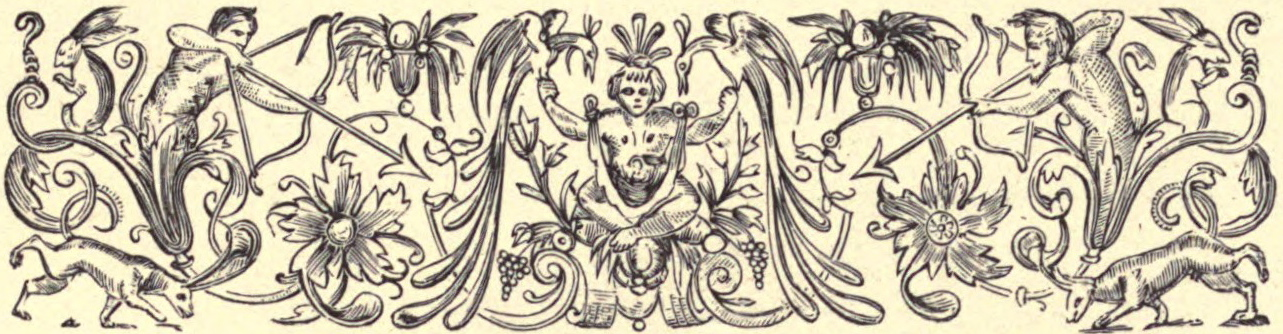
Records of Sport, Preface

Hamilton's brother Edward was the editor of his 1892 autobiography, "Records of sport in southern India chiefly on the Annamullay, Nielgherry and Pulney mountains, also including notes on Singapore, Java and Labuan, ..." This is about "years long gone by when the muzzle loader, with all its drawbacks, was the chief weapon in use." His brother Richard, a Captain in the 1st Regiment M.N.I., was well known to all Southern Indian sportsmen as the author of Game under the soubriquet of " Hawkeye."

His uncle was Captain George Peevor of His Majesty's Royal Leicestershire Regiment, who served in the Nepal Campaign of 1815-16 and in the Mahratta and Pindari wars, 1817–18, including the capture of Jubbulpore in 1839-40.

== Military career ==
In 1834 Douglas Hamilton went to the East India Company's Addiscombe Military Seminary, and received his commission in the East India Company's Army in 1837, being gazetted to the 21st Regiment of the Madras Native Infantry. He embarked at Portsmouth in the "Duke of Argyle" on 1 September of the same year, arriving in the Madras Roads on 14 December.

His regiment was sent to Kulladghee in the Bombay Presidency to replace one which had gone to the front in the first Afghan Campaign. In 1846, he went with his regiment to Singapore, and was fortunate to obtain three months' leave in 1848 to visit the Island of Java for hunting. In 1849, he visited England on furlough and returned to India in 1852.

Douglas was very interested in forest conservation in South India, and often visited his old friend General James Michael who was organizing an experimental forest conservancy in the Annaimalai Hills. He was appointed to temporarily manage the conservancy when Michael returned to England on sick leave in 1854. He showed great aptitude for these new forestry duties. In 1857 Michael was again ill and had to relinquish the work altogether. Douglas succeeded permanently to the appointment and for the three years was in charge of the Annaimalai forests, supplying teak lumber for shipbuilding at the Bombay Dockyard.

During this period he also became Assistant Conservator of Forests under Dr. Hugh Francis Cleghorn who established the Madras Forest Department and whose work led to the establishment of the Forest Department of India.

In 1860 he went with his regiment to Hong Kong and returned to Madras in February, 1861.

== Hills surveys ==
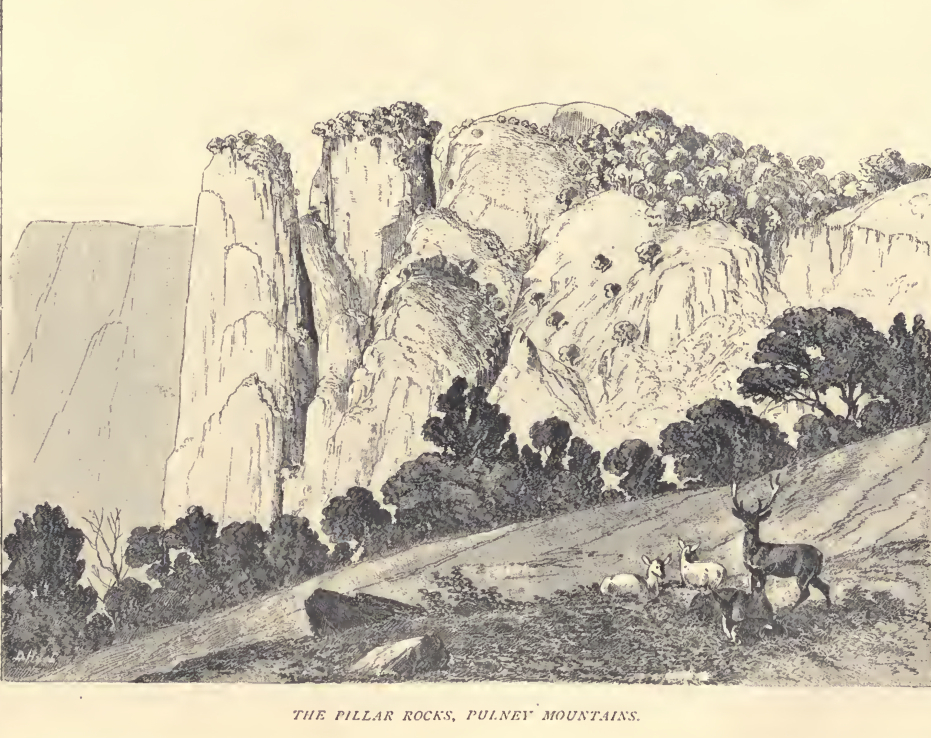
Pillar Rocks

In 1862 he was relieved of routine regimental duties and given a roving commission by Sir Charles Trevelyan, the Finance Minister of India and former Governor of Madras Presidency, to conduct surveys and make drawings for the Government of all the hill plateaus in Southern India which were likely to suit as Sanitaria, or quarters for European troops. Thereafter, Douglas Hamilton was on "special duty" with the 44th Regiment, Madras Native Infantry.

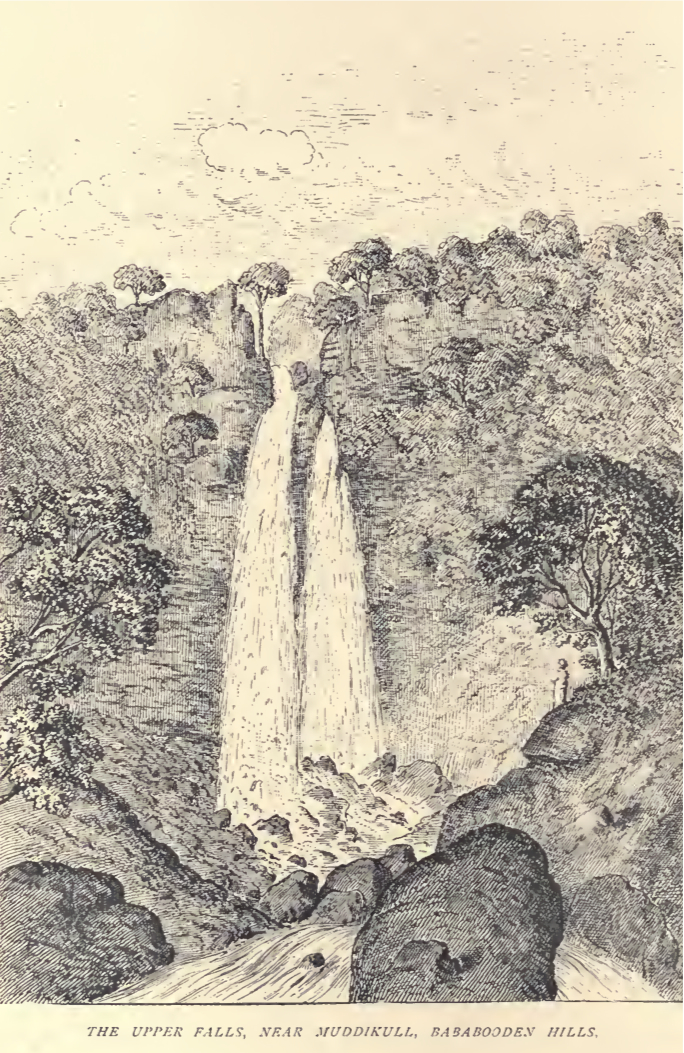
Upper falls near Muddikull, Bababooden hills

A series of careful drawings by Douglas Hamilton of the Annaimalai Hills, Palani Hills and Shevaroy Hills was the result. While at work on this commission he had great opportunities to follow his favorite pursuit, and also to observe the habits of the various animals inhabiting the different districts. These well-known drawings showed him as an accurate observer and a careful draughtsman. Each series of drawings was accompanied by a Survey article describing all aspects of the district. Some of his publications about these surveys include:

Berijam Swamp was first described in 1864 by Hamilton. In 1864, Hamilton submitted a report that stated that the Berijam Lake area was the best site in the Palani Hills for a military cantonment or Sanatorium.

Hamilton described the place as being located near a lake. As the report progressed, however, it became clear that what Hamilton initially had termed a lake was no such thing: it was a valley where he thought he detected evidence of an ancient lake bed. The distinction seemed scarcely worthy of note to Hamilton, so persuaded was he that this location offered the most picturesque environment for a settlement. "Let but the lake be reconstructed and a road made to it, and this magnificent sheet of water ... will of itself attract residents to its vicinity. "The Fort Hamilton military outpost, later built there, was named for him.

In March 1866 he went to the Budan Hills for the purpose of making drawings and a report. In August, 1870, he obtained three months' leave due to poor health and went to Australia. He visited King George Sound, Melbourne, Sydney, and Adelaide, and returned to Madras in November much better health.

Commissions

The dates of Gen. Douglas Hamilton's military commissions indicate ten promotions in his 54-year career:

Ensign- 1 January 1834, Military school
Lieutenant- 12 June 1837, the year he arrived in Madras.
Captain- 31 January 1838, rapid promotion
Major- 29 June 1858 (*2 March 1847, regimental duty in Singapore)
Lieut.-Col. 1 January 1862- (*1853, return from 3-year furlough in England)
Brevet colonel, 1 January 1867
Substantive Colonel- 1 January 1874 (*1 January 1862, begin commission from Sir Charles Trevelyan)
Major-Gen.- 1 October 1877

(Major general, transferred to unemployed supernumerary list), 1 July 1881 (*1 January 1867, before return to England)

Lieut.-Gen.-10 March 1882 (*1 October 1877, declining health)
General- 1 December 1888

(*) dates from autobiography vary from dates in London Gazette and Army Lists except General.

== Big-game hunting ==
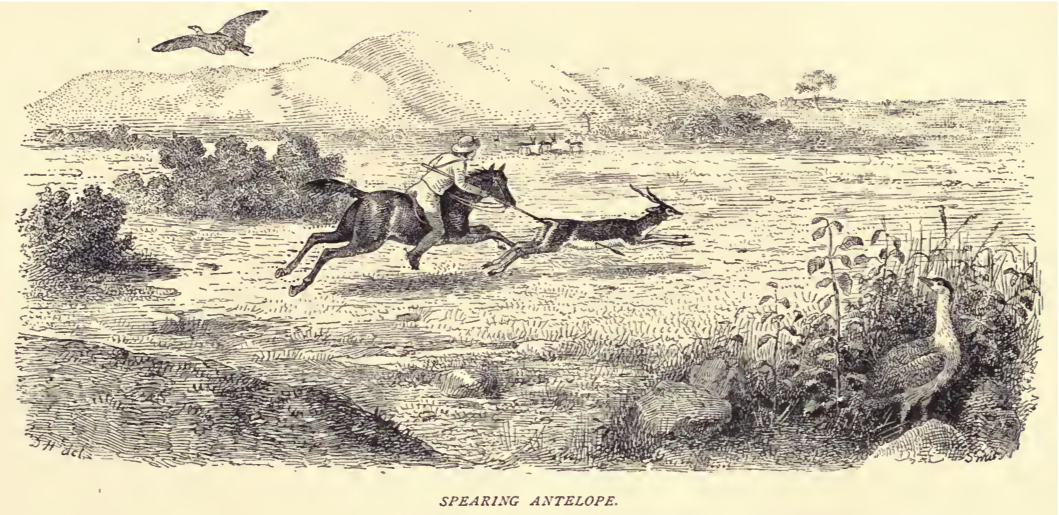
Spearing Antelope

Douglas Hamilton's earliest introduction to big game shooting was at Kulladghee in 1839. In those days Blackbuck antelopes were very numerous, but very wild and difficult to approach.

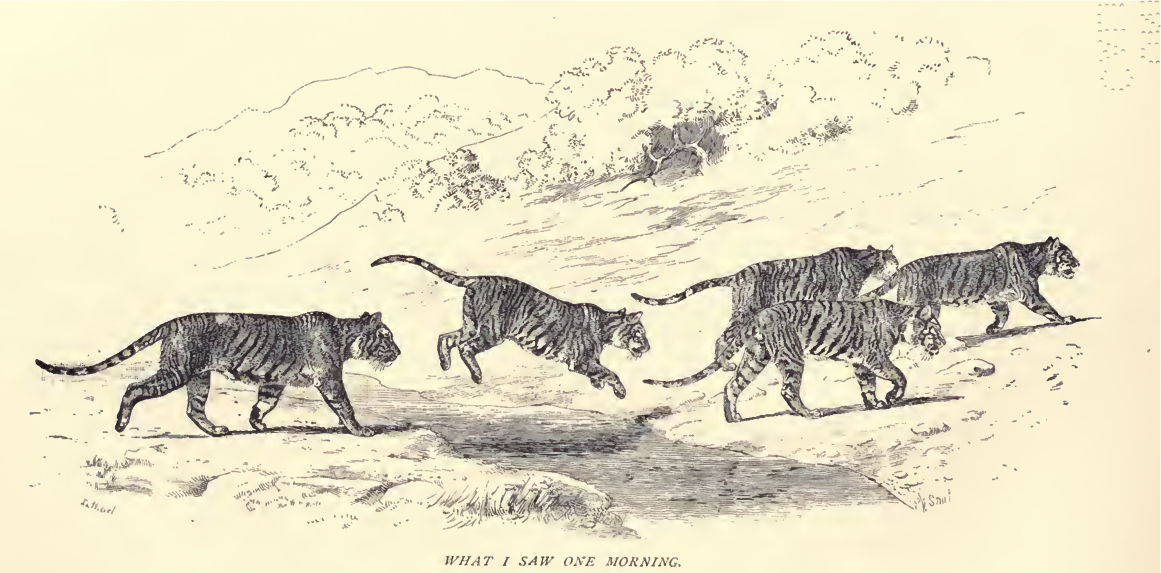
5 Tigers seen

In 1854, Hamilton bought Mallock's Bungalow at Pykara for 200 rupees. This is the well known hut, where for many years he entertained and showed sport to many of his friends, amongst whom were Prince Frederick of Schleswig Holstein, Sir Victor Brooke, Bob Jago father of the Ootacamund Hunt, and the oldest and most intimate of all, General James Michael. The hut was still in his possession when he died 38 years later.

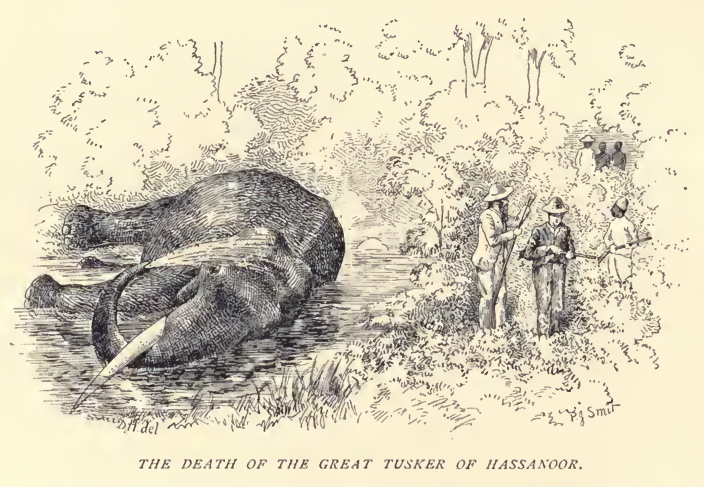
Death of the Great Tusker

He closely observed over 50 wild tigers during his career and in 1854 he killed his first tiger at the Avalanche in the Nilgiri Hills. One tiger he killed in 1857 was 98 in (250 cm) long and 38 in (97 cm) tall at the shoulder. A friend of Hamilton, Colonel Nightingale, once killed eight tigers in six days, including a man eater that attacked him and the trained elephant he was riding. That tiger was 50 in (130 cm) tall at the shoulder and 122 in (310 cm) long with length of skin, 150 in (380 cm).

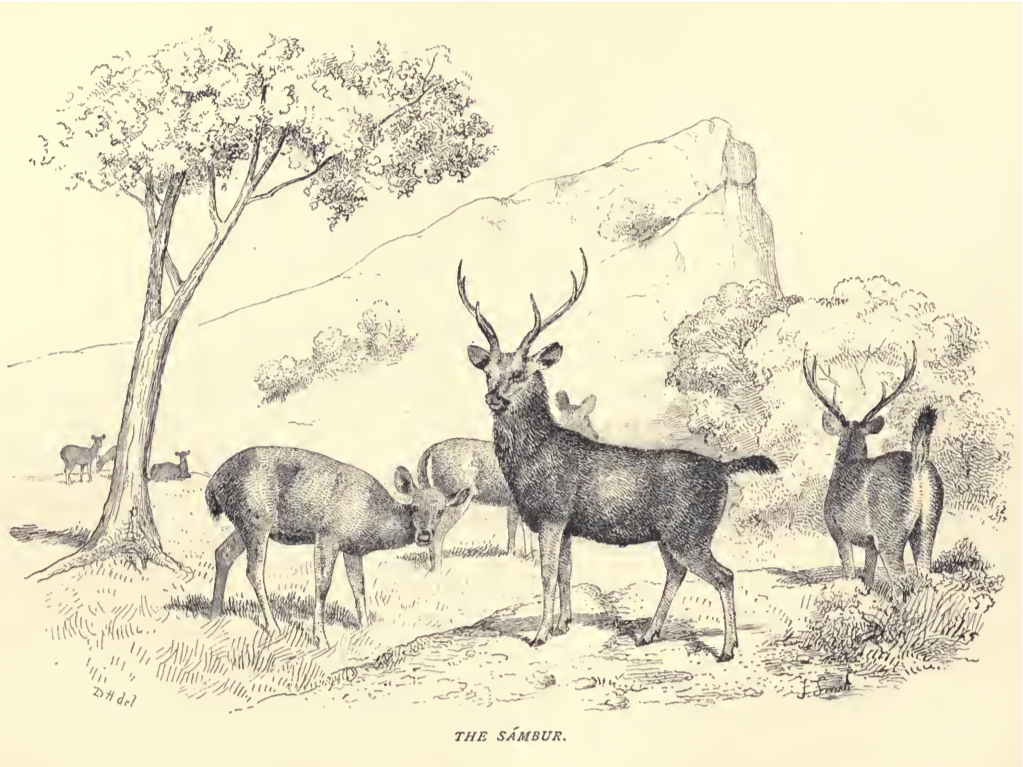
Sambar bucks and does

In 1855 in the Annaimalai Hills, he killed his first elephant, a large tusker which measured 110 in (280 cm)nine feet two inches at the shoulder, with tusks 5.5 in (14 cm) in diameter and 64.5 in (164 cm) and 57 in (140 cm) long, respectively.

In 1863, at Hassanoor together with Sir Victor Brooke, Hamilton shot the largest elephant ever killed in Southern India. This trophy had one perfect tusk 96 in (240 cm) long and a broken tusk measuring 71 in (180 cm) long. It was 11 feet (3.4 m) tall at the shoulder.

Between 1855 and 1869, Hamilton shot and killed two hundred and ninety-five sambar. The largest ever killed in the Nilgiri Hills, shot by Hamilton, stood fourteen hands (56 in (140 cm)) high at the shoulder and antlers measuring 41.5 in (105 cm) and 38.75 in (98.4 cm), respectively.

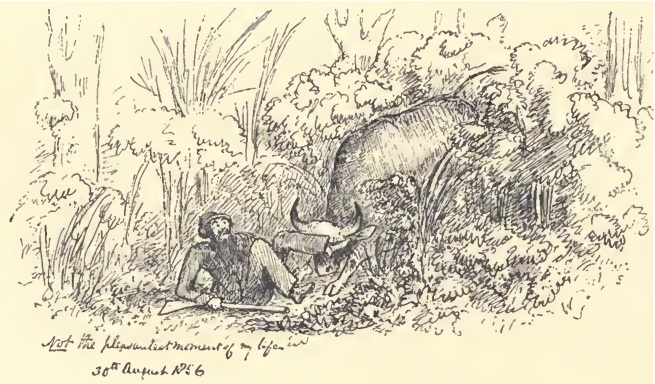
Attacked by Bison, 30 Aug. 1856

In 1856 he was attacked and run over by a large injured bison bull he shot in the Annaimalai Hills, but suffered only minor injuries. The larger horn was 35 in (89 cm) long and 5.75 in (14.6 cm) in diameter at the base. He killed his last bison at Permund in 1866.

He did not kill many leopards, but did kill one fine specimen of a black Leopard near his hut in 1857. He shot his last leopard in 1870, an old male 74 in (190 cm) long with a beautiful skin.

In 1861, Hamilton recorded 114 species of birds near Kodaikanal.

== Return to England ==
On 20 June 1871 he finally left India after thirty-five years' service, and arrived at Southampton on 19 July.

The "Oriental Sporting Magazine," in noticing his departure, has the following passage:

"The great Sportsman and Shikarie who has recently left these hills for England on account of failing health, is Colonel Douglas Hamilton, than whom [sic] a truer friend, a more kindly gentleman, a keener observer of nature, and a more enthusiastic sportsman it has never been our good fortune to know. The regret at his departure is universal. We may truly state that he has legitimately shot more game on these hills than any other sportsman, and a sight of the trophies that adorn the walls of his house, of the sketches and incidents of the chase, and the relation thereof was a rich treat, and one never again to be experienced."

From 1872 to 1887 he annually rented a moor and deer forest in Scotland, for the purpose of following his favorite pursuit of deer stalking, and many a grand stag fell to his rifle. The invigorating air of the Highlands restored his health and strength.

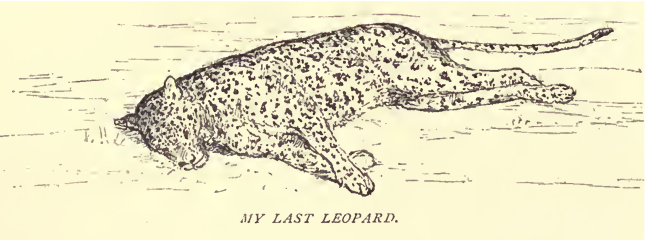
His last leopard, 8 Feb. 1870

He never appeared to suffer from severe exertion and fatigue till the autumn of 1887, when, from constant exposure in bad weather he got a violent chill, and from that date, although at times appearing to get fairly well he never recovered his health. After a sharp attack of influenza, he suddenly died on the night of 20 January 1892.

== Gallery ==
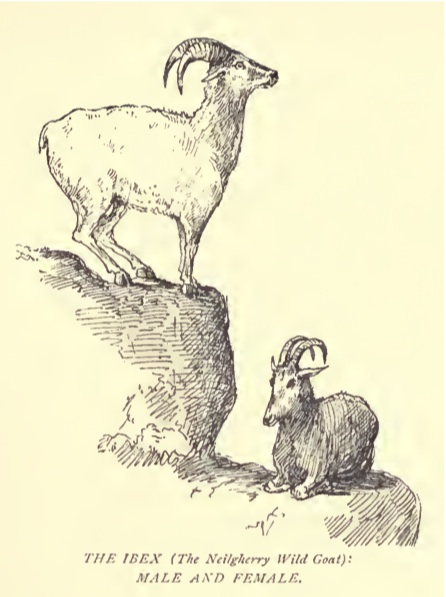
Nilgiri Tahr pair

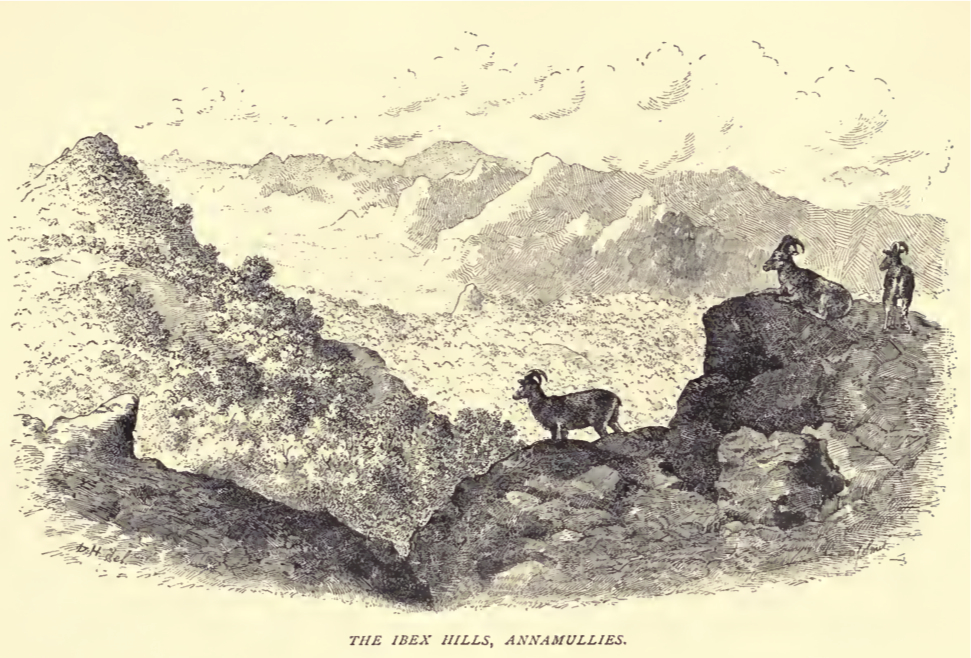
Nilgiri Tahr, Annaimalai

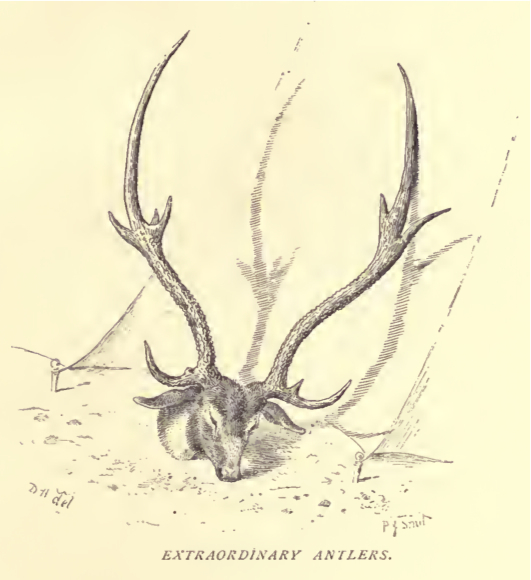
Axis deer, trophy antlers

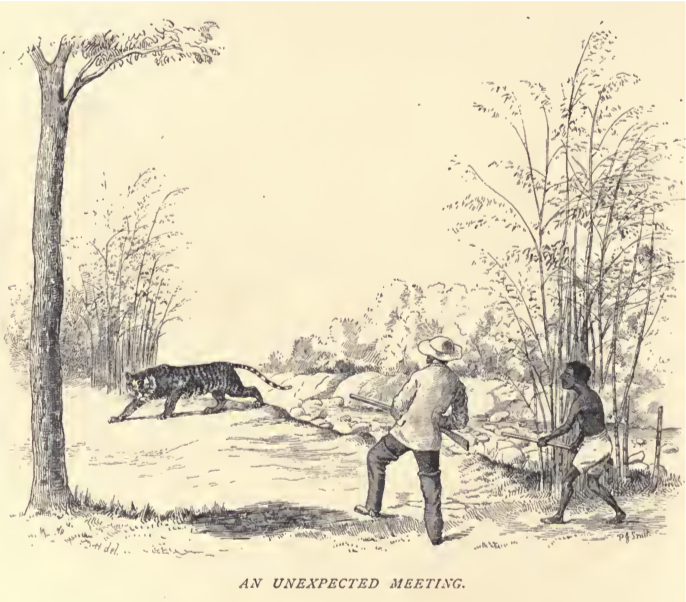
Meeting Tiger

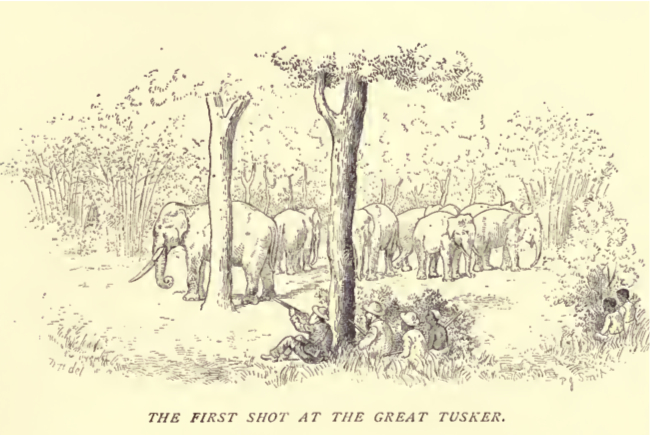
First Shot at the Great Tusker

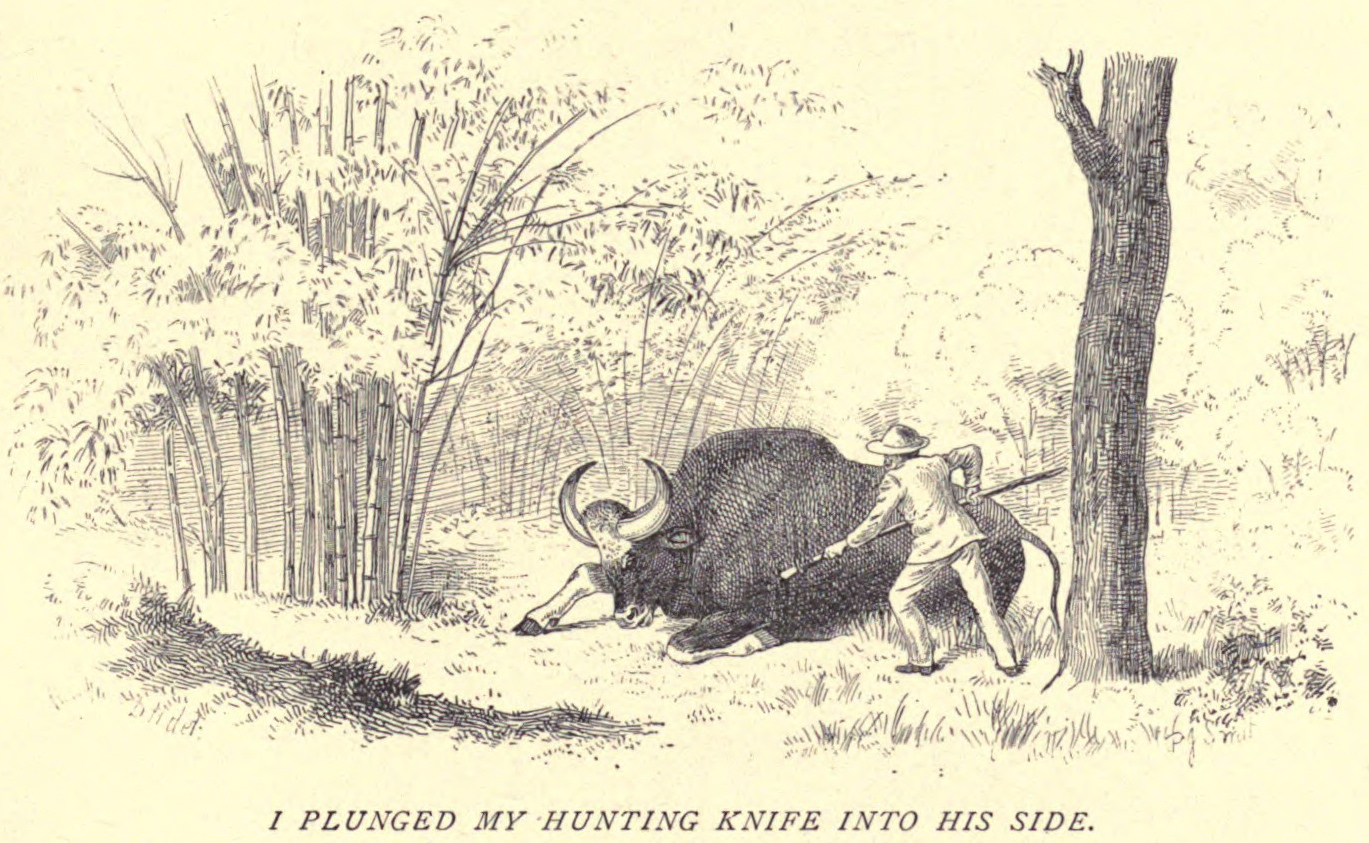
Plunge knife in Bison

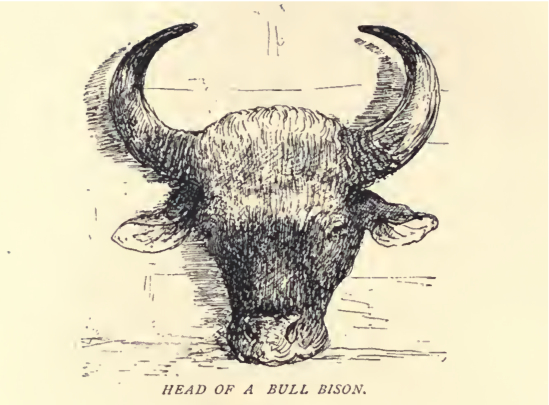
Head of bull bison

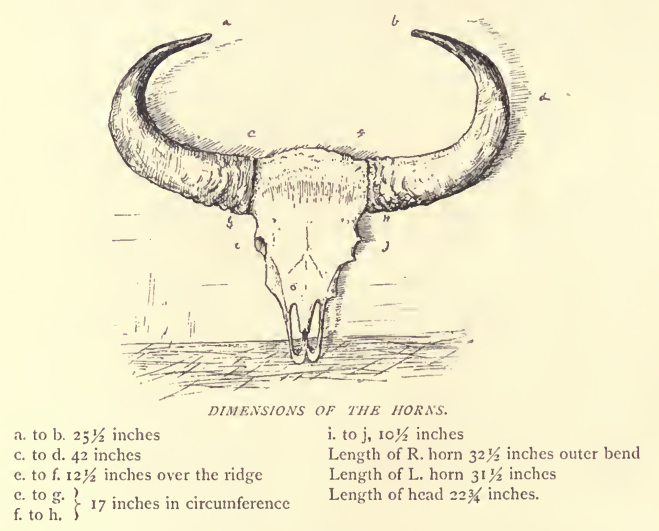
Dimensions of Bison horns
