= James Whiteside =

Irish politician and judge (1804–1876)

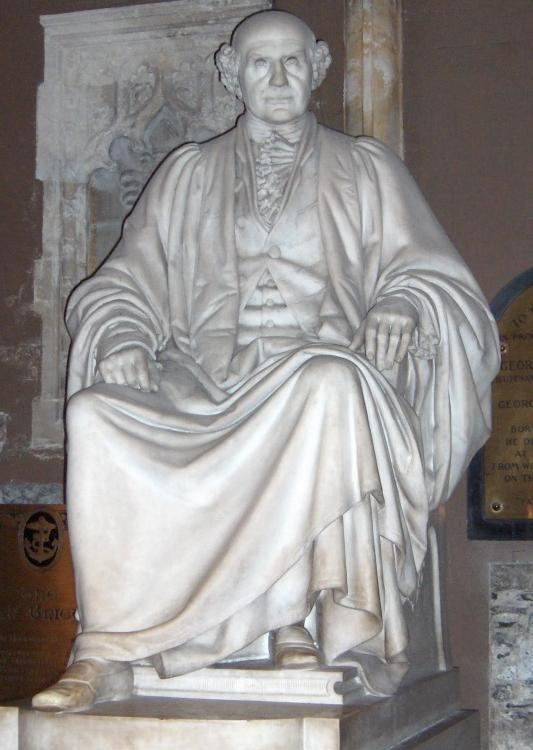
- Statue of James Whiteside by Albert Bruce-Joy in St Patrick's Cathedral, Dublin.

Lord Chief Justice of Ireland
- In office 1866–1876
- Monarch: Queen Victoria
- Prime Minister: Earl of Derby; Benjamin Disraeli

Attorney-General for Ireland
- In office 1858–1859

Solicitor-General for Ireland
- In office 1850–1852

Dublin University
- In office 1859–1866

Enniskillen
- In office 1851–1859
- Preceded by: Hon. Henry Arthur Cole
- Succeeded by: Hon. John Lowry Cole

Personal details
- Born: 12 August 1804
- Died: 25 November 1876 (aged 72)
- Party: Irish Conservative Party
- Spouse: Rosetta Napier
- Education: Trinity College Dublin

James Whiteside (12 August 1804 – 25 November 1876) was an Irish politician and judge.

== Background and education ==
Whiteside was born at Delgany, County Wicklow, the son of William Whiteside, a clergyman of the Church of Ireland. His father was transferred to the parish of Rathmines, but died when his son was only two, leaving his widow in straitened circumstances. She is said to have schooled her son personally in his early years. He was educated at Trinity College Dublin, entered the Middle Temple, and was called to the Irish bar in 1830.

== Legal and judicial career ==
Whiteside very rapidly acquired a large practice, and after taking silk in 1842 he gained a reputation for forensic oratory surpassing that of all his contemporaries, and rivalling that of his most famous predecessors of the 18th century. He defended Daniel O'Connell in the state trial of 1843, and William Smith O'Brien in 1848; and his greatest triumph was in the Yelverton case in 1861. He was elected member for Enniskillen in 1851, and in 1859 became member for Dublin University. In Parliament, he was no less successful as a speaker than at the bar, and in 1852 was appointed Solicitor-General for Ireland in the first administration of the Earl of Derby, becoming Attorney-General for Ireland in 1858, and again in 1866. In the same year he was appointed Lord Chief Justice of the Queen's Bench, having previously turned down offers of a junior judgeship. His reputation as a judge did not equal his reputation as an advocate, although he retained his great popularity. In 1848, after a visit to Italy, he published Italy in the Nineteenth Century; and in 1870 he collected and republished some papers contributed many years before to periodicals, under the title Early Sketches of Eminent Persons.

== Personal life ==
In July 1833 Whiteside married Rosetta, daughter of William and Rosetta Napier, and sister of Sir Joseph Napier, Lord Chancellor of Ireland. He died on 25 November 1876 in Brighton, Sussex.

He was universally well-liked, being noted for charm, erudition and a sense of humour. Barristers who practised before him said that his charm, courtesy and constant flow of jokes made appearing in his Court a delightful experience. His brother-in-law Napier, from whom he was estranged in later years, was overcome with grief at his death, and collapsed at the funeral.

Like his brother-in-law Joseph Napier, he was devoted to the Church of Ireland and strongly opposed its disestablishment.

== Arms ==
Coat of arms of James Whiteside

Crest
A demi-lion rampant Gules waved Argent holding in the dexter paw a rose as in the arms.
Escutcheon
Ermine a rose Gules seeded Or leaved Vert on a chief Gules a tower Or.

Parliament of the United Kingdom
Preceded by Hon. Henry Arthur Cole	Member of Parliament for Enniskillen; 1851–1859	Succeeded by Hon. John Lowry Cole
Preceded by George Alexander Hamilton; Anthony Lefroy	Member of Parliament for Dublin University; 1859–1866; With: Anthony Lefroy	Succeeded by John Edward Walsh; Anthony Lefroy
Legal offices
Preceded by Henry George Hughes	Solicitor-General for Ireland; 1852–1852	Succeeded by William Keogh
Preceded by John David Fitzgerald	Attorney-General for Ireland; 1858–1859	Succeeded by John David Fitzgerald
Preceded by Thomas Langlois Lefroy	Lord Chief Justice of the King's Bench for Ireland; 1866–1876	Succeeded by George Augustus Chichester May
