= Sir Arthur Brooke, 2nd Baronet =

Anglo-Irish politician

Sir Arthur Brinsley Brooke, 2nd Baronet (1797 – 21 November 1854), was an Anglo-Irish Conservative politician.

Brooke was the eldest son of Sir Henry Brooke, 1st Baronet, and his wife Harriet, daughter of The Hon. John Butler.

== Career ==
In 1831 he served as High Sheriff of Fermanagh and in 1840 was returned to Parliament as one of two representatives for County Fermanagh, a seat he held until his death fourteen years later.

Lisnaskea Poor Law Union was formally declared on 27 June 1840 and in August that year Sir Arthur Brooke was elected chairman.

== Marriage and family ==
Brooke married The Hon. Julia Henrietta, daughter of General Sir George Anson, in 1841. Lady Brooke served as Maid of Honour to Queen Victoria.

They had several children and their descendants include Field Marshal Sir Alan Brooke, 1st Viscount Alanbrooke, and Sir Basil Brooke, 1st Viscount Brookeborough.

Brooke died in November 1854 and was succeeded in the baronetcy by his eldest son, Victor. Lady Brooke died in December 1886.

Parliament of the United Kingdom
Preceded by Viscount Cole; Mervyn Edward Archdale	Member of Parliament for County Fermanagh; 1840–1854; With: Mervyn Edward Archdale	Succeeded by Mervyn Edward Archdale; Hon. Henry Arthur Cole
Baronetage of the United Kingdom
Preceded by Henry Brooke	Baronet (of Colebrooke); 1834–1854	Succeeded by Sir Victor Alexander Brooke
