= Lowry Cole, 4th Earl of Enniskillen =

Irish peer and Conservative Member of Parliament (1845–1924)

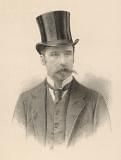
The Earl of Enniskillen

Lowry Egerton Cole, 4th Earl of Enniskillen, KP, DL (21 December 1845 – 28 April 1924), styled Viscount Cole from 1850 to 1886, was an Irish peer and Conservative Member of Parliament.

== Background ==
Cole was the second – but eldest surviving – son of William Willoughby Cole, 3rd Earl of Enniskillen and his wife, Jane Casamaijor.

He was educated at Eton College.

== Political career ==
As Lord Cole, he was appointed High Sheriff of Fermanagh for 1870 and then elected to the House of Commons for Enniskillen in 1880, a seat he held until 1885 when the constituency was abolished. The following year he succeeded his father as fourth Earl of Enniskillen and entered the House of Lords.

Lord Enniskillen was appointed a Knight of the Order of St Patrick (KP) in the 1902 Coronation Honours list published on 26 June 1902, and was invested by the Lord Lieutenant of Ireland, Earl Cadogan, at Dublin Castle on 11 August 1902.

== Personal life ==
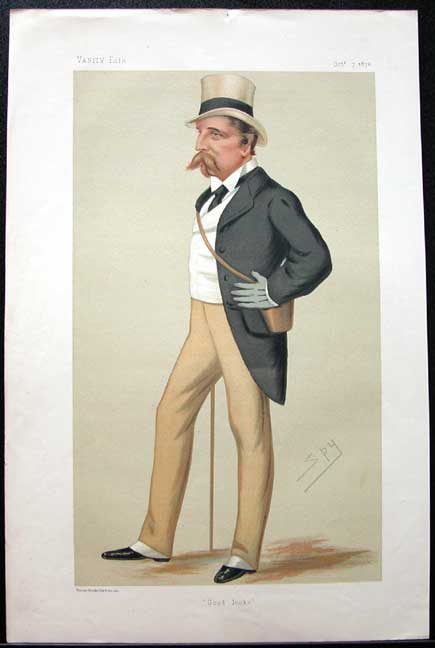
'Good Looks'. Caricature of Lord Enniskillen by Spy, published in Vanity Fair in 1876.

Lord Enniskillen married Charlotte Marion Baird, daughter of wealthy Scottish businessman Douglas Baird and his wife Charlotte Acton, in 1869. The following year he was cited as one of two co-respondents in the case for divorce brought by Sir Charles Mordaunt, 10th Bt., a former M.P., against his wife, Harriet, in which Prince Albert Edward, The Prince of Wales (later King Edward VII), was called to give evidence. The divorce was denied as Lady Mordaunt was judged to be insane, but was finally granted in 1875 when Cole did not contest the claim that he was the father of Lady Mordaunt's daughter, Violet (1869–1928), later Marchioness of Bath. Lord Enniskillen died in April 1924, aged 78, and was succeeded in his titles by his second – but eldest surviving – son John. Lady Enniskillen died in 1937.

The third son of Lord Enniskillen was The Hon. Galbraith Lowry Egerton Cole (1881–1929), a pioneer settler (1905) of the East Africa Protectorate. His Kekopey Ranch on Lake Elementaita, Kenya, where he is buried, is preserved today as the Lake Elementaita Lodge.

His daughter, Lady Florence Anne Cole, married Hugh Cholmondeley, 3rd Baron Delamere of Vale Royal (b. 28 Apr 1870, d. 13 Nov 1931).

His daughter, Lady Kathleen Mary Cole, married Lt.-Col. Charles Walter Villiers CBE, and was grandmother to Peregrine Eliot, 10th Earl of St Germans (b. 2 Jan 1941, d. 15 Jul 2016) and Lady Frances Helen Mary Eliot, Countess of Shelburne (b. 6 Mar 1943, d. 6 Jan 2004).

== Notes ==
Parliament of the United Kingdom
Preceded by Viscount Crichton	Member of Parliament for Enniskillen; 1880–1885	Constituency abolished
Peerage of Ireland
Preceded by William Willoughby Cole	Earl of Enniskillen; 1886–1924	Succeeded by John Henry Michael Cole
