= Sir Gerard Irvine, 1st Baronet =

Sir Gerard Irvine, 1st Baronet (circa 1616 – October 1689) was an Anglo-Irish soldier who supported the Royalist cause throughout the English Civil War.

Irvine was the son of Christopher Irvine and Blanche Irvine. In 1641 he was a captain of a troop of horse in the army of Charles I of England during the Irish Rebellion of 1641. He supported the king during the Civil War, fighting in the North West of Ireland before being taken prisoner by Parliamentarian forces and sentenced to death. He was rescued from Cork before he could be executed.

He joined Charles II's army at the Battle of Worcester in 1651, serving as a lieutenant colonel to Sir Arthur Forbes. Irvine participated in Glencairn's rising in 1653 before fleeing to Ireland.

He returned to prominence following the Stuart Restoration and was High Sheriff of Fermanagh in 1672. On 31 July 1677 he was made a baronet, of Castle Irvine in the Baronetage of Ireland by Charles II. He died in Dundalk in October 1689 while in the service of William III of England during the Williamite War in Ireland.

Irvine married firstly Catherine, daughter of Captain Adam Cathcart; she died childless. He married secondly, Mary, daughter of Major William Hamilton, Laird of Blair, by whom (who died at Castle Irvine, in 1685) he had two sons (who both predeceased him) and a daughter, Mary, who married John Crichton and was an ancestor of the Earls of Erne. Irvine's title became extinct upon his death.

Baronetage of Ireland
New creation	Baronet (of Castle Irvine); 1677–1689	Extinct
