= High Sheriff of Fermanagh =

Judicial representative of the Monarch in Northern Ireland

The High Sheriff of Fermanagh is the Sovereign's judicial representative in County Fermanagh. Initially an office for lifetime, assigned by the Sovereign, the High Sheriff became annually appointed from the Provisions of Oxford in 1258. Besides his judicial importance, he has ceremonial and administrative functions and executes High Court Writs.

== History ==
The first (High) Shrivalties were established before the Norman Conquest in 1066 and date back to Saxon times. In 1908, an Order in Council made the Lord-Lieutenant the Sovereign's prime representative in a county and reduced the High Sheriff's precedence. Despite however that the office retains his responsibilities for the preservation of law and order in a county.

While the office of High Sheriff ceased to exist in those Irish counties, which had formed the Irish Free State in 1922, it is still present in the counties of Northern Ireland.

== High Sheriffs of County Fermanagh ==
=== 17th century ===
- 1605: Shane McHugh
- 1606: Edmond Ellis
- 1607: James Plunkett
- 1608: William Cole
- 1609: James Plunkett
- 1610: Thomas Brown
- 1611: Roger Atkinson
- 1612: James Plunkett
- 1613: Thomas Flowerdewe
- 1614: Roger Atkinson
- 16nn: Edward Sibthorpe; Roger Atkinson
- 1615: Sir William Cole
- 1616: John Archdale
- 1618: Thomas Flowerdewe
- 1619–1621: Roger Atkinson
- 1622: Samuel Blennerhassett
- 1623: Sir William Cole
- 1624: Samuel Hayles
- 1625: Sir John Wemyss
- 1627: Sir William Cole
- 1626: Sir John Dunbar
- 1634: Roger Atkinson
- 1639: Arthur Champion
- 1640: Michael Cole (son of William, HS 1623)
- 1641: George Gascoigne
- 1642: Stephen Allen
- 1643: Brian Stapleton
- 1646: Thomas Coote
- 1655: Nicholas Willoughby
- 1656: Thomas Coote; Nicholas Willoughby.
- 1657: Nicholas Willoughby
- 1658: Henry Blennerhasset.
- 1659: William Davys
- 1660: William Davys
- 1661: Henry Blennerhasset
- 1662: Sir John Hume, 2nd Baronet of Tully Castle
- 1663: Nicholas Willoughby
- 1664: James Caldwell
- 1665: Sir Gilbert Eccles of Shannock Manor
- 1666: John Corry of Castlecoole
- 1667: William Archdale
- 1668: Sir William Gore
- 1669: Sir Henry Brooke, Kt
- 1670, Michael Cole
- 1671: James Corry of Castlecoole
- 1672: Sir Gerard Irvine, Baronet of Castle Irvine
- 1673: Abraham Crichton of Crum Castle
- 1674: Henry Haslett, or Hassett
- 1675: Daniel Eccles of Shannock Manor (son of Gilbert, HS 1665)
- 1676: Jason Hassard.
- 1677: James Caldwell
- 1678: Ferdinando Davis, of Lisgold, near Enniskillen
- 1679: Walter Johnston.
- 1680: James Somerville
- 1681: William Irvine of Castle Irvine
- 1682: David Rynd.
- 1683: John Crichton.
- 1684: Lancelot Carleton of Rossfad
- 1685: Hugh Montgomery.
- 1686: Michael Cole
- 1687: Coconnaght Magulre.
- 1688: Coconnaght Maguire.
- 1689: Christopher Irvine.
- 1690: Christopher Irvine of Castle Irvine
- 1691: George Buchanan.
- 1692: William Archdale.
- 1693: Henry Caldwell
- 1694: William Elliott
- 1695: Jason Hassard.
- 1696: Gilbert Eccles
- 1697: Edward Davys.
- 1698: Gilbert Eccles.
- 1699: Lancelot Carleton

=== 18th century ===
- 1700: Charles Wallis.
- 1701: Sir Gustavus Hume, 3rd Baronet
- 1702: Hugh Montgomery.
- 1703: Alexander Acheson
- 1704: Allen Cathcart
- 1705: Walter Johnston
- 1706: John Crichton
- 1707: James Johnston
- 1708: John Rynd of Derryvolan
- 1709: Henry Brooke
- 1710: Samuel Madden
- 1711: John Corry
- 1712: Joseph Eccles
- 1713: Hugh Montgomery
- 1714: Mervyn Archdale
- 1715: John Crichton
- 1716: Christopher Irvine of Castle Irvine
- 1717: James Johnston
- 1718: Guy Carleton
- 1719: Robert Hassard
- 1720: Nicholas Ward
- 1721: Henry Greene
- 1722: Edward Archdale
- 1723: Nicholas Montgomery of Derrygonelly
- 1724: John Cole
- 1725: Christopher Irvine
- 1726: Daniel Eccles
- 1727: John Enery
- 1728: James King
- 1729: Hugh Montgomery.
- 1730: Sir John Caldwell, 3rd Baronet
- 1731: Francis Johnston
- 1732: Francis Johnston
- 1733: John Cole
- 1734: Christopher Irvine of Cooles and Rockfield
- 1735: Jason Crawford of Lawrencetown, Co. Meath
- 1736: William Smyth
- 1737: Leslie Corry
- 1738: Henry Crawford
- 1789: James Crawford of Enniskillen
- 1740: John Hamilton
- 1741: Ralph Crawford
- 1742: Margetson Armar
- 1743: George Nixon
- 1744: George Yanghan
- 1745: David Rynd of Derryvolan
- 1746: Sir St. George Gore St George, 5th Baronet
- 1747: Edward Smyth
- 1748: Jason Hassard
- 1749: Samuel Molyneux Madden
- 1750: Robert Eccles
- 1751: George Dunbar
- 1752: Sir Arthur Brooke
- 1753: James Thompson
- 1754: John Coulson
- 1755: James Noble
- 1756: Sir James Caldwell, 4th Baronet
- 1757: William Townley Balfour
- 1758: William Irvine of Castle Irvine
- 1759: Andrew Crawford
- 1760: Sir Ralph Gore
- 1761: Alexander Nixon
- 1762: Alexander Crawford
- 1763: John Irvine
- 1764: John Enery
- 1765: John Crosier
- 1766: Edward Madden
- 1767: Arthur Cooper
- 1768: Joseph Hall
- 1769: Hugh Montgomery
- 1770: John Coulson
- 1771: Jason Hassard
- 1772: William Hassard of Carne
- 1773: Mervyn Archdall of Castle Archdall
- 1774: Abraham Crichton
- 1775: Henry Ricbardson
- 1776: Alexander Gordon
- 1777: Edward Barton of Spring Hill, Co. Tyrone
- 1778: Arthur Cole Hamilton of Beltrim Castle
- 1779: Armar Lowry-Corry
- 1780: Hugh Maguire
- 1781: Andrew Johnston
- 1782: John M'Clintock
- 1783: John Richardson
- 1784: Humphrey Nixon
- 1785: George Nixon
- 1786: Francis Brooke
- 1787: William Barton
- 1788: John Johnston
- 1789: Ambrose Upton
- 1790: Riohard Irwin
- 1791: John Armstrong
- 1792: Eyles Irwin; William O'Brien
- 1793: Samuel Madden
- 1794: William Tredennick
- 1795: John Watkins
- 1796: Robert Wdr? (Kerr?)
- 1797: John Moutray Jones
- 1798: Sir John Caldwell, 5th Baronet
- 1799: Hamilton Irvine

=== 19th century ===
- 1800: Andrew Nixon
- 1801: John King
- 1802: James King
- 1803: Gerard Irvine
- 1804: George Nixon
- 1805: John Richardson
- 1806: Samuel Lyle of The Oaks Lodge, Co Londonderry; George Lendrum of Jamestown
- 1807: George Ledie
- 1808: John Madden
- 1809: Humphrey Stewart Nixon
- 1810: James Auchinleck
- 1811: Christopher L'Estrange later Carleton of Market Hill
- 1812, John Aiken
- 1813: Edward Archdale
- 1814: John Crichton
- 1815: James Denham
- 1816: Richard Dane
- 1817: Andrew Crawford
- 1818: George Hassard
- 1819: John Irvine
- 1820: William D'Arcy Irvine
- 1821: John Arnold Tredennick of Camlin Castle, Ballyshannon
- 1822: Charles D. Madden
- 1823: Edward Denny of Moorstown
- 1824: Michael Jones of Lisgoole Abbey
- 1825: John Colpays Bloomfield, of Castle Caldwell, Belleek
- 1826: John Mayne
- 1827: John Crichton, 3rd Earl Erne
- 1828: Sir Henry Brooke, 1st Baronet
- 1829: Ambrose Upton Gledstanes
- 1830: Alexander FitzGerald Crawford
- 1831: Sir Arthur Brinsley Brooke, 2nd Baronet
- 1832: Armar Lowry-Corry, 3rd Earl Belmore
- 1833: Henry Mervyn Richardson of Rosfad
- 1834: Folliott Warren Barton of Clonelly
- 1835: James Lendrum of Magheracross
- 1836: William Hall
- 1837: Hugh William Barton
- 1838: George Hassard
- 1839: John Brien of Johnstown
- 1840: Simon Armstrong.
- 1841: Alexander Nixon; James Johnston.
- 1842: John L. Cole of Florence Court, Enniskillen
- 1843: Richard Hall.
- 1844: John Grey Vesey Porter of Belleisle
- 1845: William Humphrys Mervyn Archdale
- 1846: John Netterville Blake
- 1847: Capel St George
- 1848: John Madden of Roslea Manor
- 1849: Paul Dane
- 1850: Thomas Morris Jones, of Belloo, Moneyglass, Toome.
- 1851: William Jones
- 1852: John Gerard Irvine of Killadeas
- 1853: James Halre?
- 1854: Henry Arthur Cole; Henry Cavendish Boaer?
- 1855: Robert Collins
- 1856: George F. Brooke
- 1857: Henry Crichton
- 1858: Francis J. Graham
- 1859: John Madden
- 1860: Edward Maguire
- 1861: Nicholas Montgomery Archdale
- 1862: Edward Irwin of Derrygore
- 1863: Charles Robert Barton of the Waterfoot, Middlebrook
- 1864: John Henry Crichton, 4th Earl Erne of Crom Castle
- 1865: John Brady of Johnstown
- 1866: Richard Irwin of Rathmoyle
- 1867: Sir Victor Alexander Brooke, 3rd Baronet of Colebrook, Brookeborough
- 1868: John Mervyn Archdall Carleton Richardson of Rossfad and Rich Hill
- 1869: John Dawson Brien of Castletown, Enniskillen
- 1870: Lowry Egerton Cole, 4th Earl of Enniskillen
- 1871: Hugh de Fellenberg Montgomery of Blessingbourne House, Fivemiletown
- 1872: Edward Archdall
- 1873: Sir William Emerson Tennant
- 1874: John Caldwell Bloomfield
- 1875: George Cosby Lendrum of Magheracross
- 1876: George Carleton Lestrange.
- 1877: Robert Edgeworth Johnstone
- 1878: Captain William Collum, Bellevue, Enniskillen
- 1879: Mervyn Edward Archdale
- 1880: Robert Hassard
- 1881: Peter L. Peacocke
- 1882: Thomas Teeran
- 1883: John Porter-Porter
- 1884: Edward Archdale
- 1885: William D'Arcy Irvine of Castle Irvine
- 1886: Charles Cockburn D'Arcy Irvine
- 1887:
- 1888: John Arthur Irwin of Derrygore
- 1891: John Gerard Christopher Irvine of Killadeas
- 1892: Archibald Collum esq Dublin; Patrick Joseph Conway Tuam, Co Galway; John Brian Firth esq, The Cross. Enniskillen.
- 1895: Armar Lowry-Corry, 5th Earl Belmore
- 1896: Arthur Douglas Brooke
- 1897: John George Crozier of Gortra House
- 1898:
- 1899: John Douglas Johnstone

=== 20th century ===
- 1900: John George Beresford Massy-Beresford of Macbie Hill
- 1901: Henry Stubbs of Danby, Ballyshannon, Co Donegal
- 1902: Edward Archdale (b. 1850)
- 1903:
- 1904: George Archdale of Dromard, Kesh
- 1905:
- 1908: John Ernest Francis Collum of Belleview
- 1909: John Clements Waterhouse Madden of Hilton Park, Clones
- 1910: James Cecil Johnston of Magheramena Castle
- 1911:
- 1922: Cecil Lowry-Corry, 6th Earl Belmore
- 1923: James Blackwood Archdale of Castle Archdale, Irvinestown
- 1924: Colonel William Hugh Barton of The Waterfoot, Pettigo
- 1925: Hugh Montgomery Irwin of Derrygore, Enniskillen
- 1926: Capt. William Gordon Nixon of Belcoo, Enniskillen
- 1927: Christopher Hugh Maude of Lenaghan, Enniskillen
- 1928: Lieut.-Col. Henry S. C. Richardson of Rossfad, Ballinamallard,
- 1929: Captain Terence Trevor Hamilton Verschoyle of Tullycleagh, Ballinamallard
- 1930: Sir Charles Langham, 13th Baronet of Tempo Manor, Tempo
- 1931: George Henry Wellington Loftus, 7th Marquess of Ely of Ely Lodge, Enniskillen
- 1932: Richard Outram Hermon of Necarne Castle, Irvinestown
- 1933: Henry Burnley Rathborne of Blen-na-lung, Leggs
- 1934: Geoffrey Robert Josceline Corbett of Rossferry, Enniskillen
- 1935: Captain William Beaconsfield Teele of Dunbar, Enniskillen.
- 1936: Revd. Canon Walter Auchinleck Stack of Muckross
- 1937: John Brien Talbot Frith of Dronfield, Enniskillen,
- 1938: Lt.-Colonel Richard Clifford of Dromard, Kesh
- 1939: Louis de Montfort, Lisbofin House, Letterbreen
- 1940: Thomas. Charles Bryan Pulvertaft, Gortatole, Florencecourt
- 1941: Nicholas Henry Archdale Porter of Belle Isle, Lisbellaw
- 1942: Major John Alexander Henderson of Willoughby Place, Enniskillen.
- 1943: John Lombe Haddon Askwith, Ardvarney, Ederney
- 1944: Mervyn Henry Dawson Archdale of Castle Archdale, Irvinestown
- 1945: Albert James Frederick William Anderson of Crevenish, Kesh
- 1946: Bertram James Richardson Barton of The Waterfoot, Letter,
- 1947: Walter James Hume Cooper of Blaney Lodge, Enniskillen ,
- 1948: Cecil David Whaley, of Cooper Crescent, Enniskillen.
- 1949: Gerard Mervyn Frederick Irvine of Osborne Park, Belfast
- 1950: Lt.-Col. Michael Henry Crichton of Crum Castle
- 1951: William Egbert Trimble of The Battery, Enniskillen
- 1952: Robert Grosvenor, 5th Duke of Westminster of Ely Lodge, Enniskillen,
- 1953: Major Eric Eadie, Faughard House, Lisbellaw
- 1954: Harry West of Mullaghmeen, Enniskillen,
- 1955: John Warden Brooke, 2nd Viscount Brookeborough of Ashbrooke House, Brookeborough
- 1956: Herbert Johnston Dudgeon Moffitt of Dalecroft, Ballinamallard
- 1957: William Funston Bryson of Cherry Island, Enniskillen
- 1958: Major William Wilson of Ferney, Ballinamallard
- 1959: Major David Devine of Old Rossorry Road, Enniskillen
- 1960: George Arthur Cathcart of Bellanaleck, Enniskillen
- 1961: John Crawford Little of Dublin Road, Enniskillen
- 1962: James Morrell of Cuil Rathain, Chanterhill Road, Enniskillen
- 1963: Joseph Alfred Livingstone of Castlebalfour, Lisnaskea
- 1964: James Douglas Alexander Henderson of LisbeHaw, Enniskillen
- 1965: William Moore of The Coagh, Enniskillen
- 1966: William Swan of Drumany House, Thompson's Bridge, Enniskillen.
- 1967: Harold Kingston Armstrong of Belmore Street, Enniskillen
- 1968: Lieut.-Col. George Edwin Liddle of Chanterhill Road, Enniskillen.
- 1969:James Nicholas David Fawcett of Templenaffrin, Belcoo, Enniskillen.
- 1970: Ian Chapman Eadie of The Limes, Lisbellaw.
- 1971: John J. Maguire of Edgemere, Tamlaght, Enniskillen,
- 1972: Simon F. W. T. Barton Loane of Crocknacrieve, Enniskillen,
- 1973: D. T. Archdale of Castle Archdale, Irvinestown
- 1974: Samuel Burnside of Cultiagh House, Tamlaght, Enniskillen,
- 1975: Frank B. Gage of The Old Rectory, Tubrid, Kesh,
- 1976: Michael W. Scallon of Main Street, Irvinestown,
- 1977: Ian Gamble Brown of Drumclay Road, Enniskillen,
- 1978: Raymond Blakely McCartney of Barrandeny Heights, Enniskillen
- 1979: George Hurst of Killadeas. Enniskillen,
- 1980: Matthew James Ivan Kee of Chanterhill Road, Enniskilleri,
- 1981: William Gordon Wilson of Cooper Crescent, Enniskillen
- 1982: James Somerville Henderson of "Fairwinds", Ballinamallard
- 1983: Norman Hilliard of Hollyhill Crescent, Enniskillen
- 1984: Roland Rennie Aluistair Eadie, Aghavea Glebe, Brookeborough, Co. Fermanagh
- 1985: T. S. Fisher, Sefton, Drumurry, Ballinamallard
- 1986: Sam Morrow of Enniskillen
- 1987: Lavinia Baird, Belle Isle, Lisbellaw, Co Fermanagh
- 1988: Stanley Moffatt, Letterbreen
- 1989: Dr William Kyle, Lisnarick
- 1990: William Moore of The Coagh, Enniskillen
- 1991: V. Chambers, The Oaks, Aghnacarra, Lisbellaw
- 1992: E A Aiken of Drumadravey House, Irvinestown
- 1993: W. R. Dickson, Donegall House, Springfield, Enniskillen
- 1994: W. R. M. Farrell, Cushwash House, Lisnaskea, Enniskillen
- 1995: Alan Henry Brooke, 3rd Viscount Brookeborough of Colebrooke Park, Brookeborough
- 1996: Peter Moffitt Crawford Little of Dublin Road, Enniskillen (from 1 Aug 1996)
- 1997: Peter Moffitt Crawford Little of Dublin Road, Enniskillen (extended term)
- 1998: Ronald Arthur David Kells, Castlebalfour, Lisnaskea
- 1999: Paula G. Moore of Drumbane, Kesh

=== 21st century ===
- 2000: John Lendrum Dickey of Ardmore House, Brownhill, Irvinestown,
- 2001 Elizabeth G. McM. Thompson, The Rectory, Enniskillen Road, Irvinestown,
- 2002: Heny Frances Keys of Dunena Avenue, Irvinestown
- 2003: Avril Mary Kee, Aldervale, Chanterhill Road, Enniskillen
- 2004: William Thomas David McMullen, Farranasculloge, Lisnaskea
- 2005: Archie Birrell of Maguiresbridge
- 2006: Susan Christine Hogg of Enniskillen
- 2007: Rosemary Ann Elizabeth Forde, Oakfield Road, Mulaghy, Enniskillen,
- 2008: Jonathan Appleby Styles of Drumsillagh House, Enniskillen
- 2009: Helen Lanigan Wood of Derrychara, Enniskillen
- 2010: Kenneth Samuel Fisher of Ballinamallard
- 2011: Terence Blakely McCartney
- 2012: Joanna McVey of Enniskillen
- 2013: Roisin McManus of Enniskillen
- 2014: Henry Robinson of Ballinamallard
- 2015: Hope Kerr of Enniskillen
- 2016: Roisin Smith of Enniskillen
- 2017: Selwyn Johnston of Enniskillen
- 2018: John Patrick Maguire of Lisnarick
- 2019: Mary Kathleen Doherty of Enniskillen
- 2020: Breda Ann McGrenaghan
- 2021: Catherine Irwin
- 2022: Patrick O'Doherty
- 2023: Noelle Mary McAlinden, of Enniskillen
- 2024: Norman Joseph Coalter, of Enniskillen
- 2025: David Robert Martin Donaldson MBE, of Enniskillen
- 2026: Alison Mavis Annan

== Sources ==
- List of Fermanagh High Sheriffs 1606–1865
