= 1876 Enniskillen by-election =

UK parliamentary by-election

The 1876 Enniskillen by-election was held on 15 February 1876. The by-election was held due to the incumbent Conservative MP, John Crichton, being appointed Lord Commissioner of the Treasury. It was retained by the incumbent.
