= Esther Archdall =

New Zealand textile artist

Esther Archdall (1916–1999) was a New Zealand textile artist. Her work is in the permanent collection of the Christchurch Art Gallery.

She was born in North Canterbury and studied painting at the Canterbury School of Fine Arts. She also trained as a teacher. In 1964 she received an Arts Council grant to study in Scandinavia and Britain. She later became the District Arts and Crafts Advisor for schools in the Canterbury area, retiring from the position in 1977.

In 1980 Archdall studied tapestry weaving at the Royal Melbourne Institute of Technology and in 1990 studied at the Chisholm Institute, Melbourne.
