= William Robinson (British painter) =

English portrait painter, born 1799

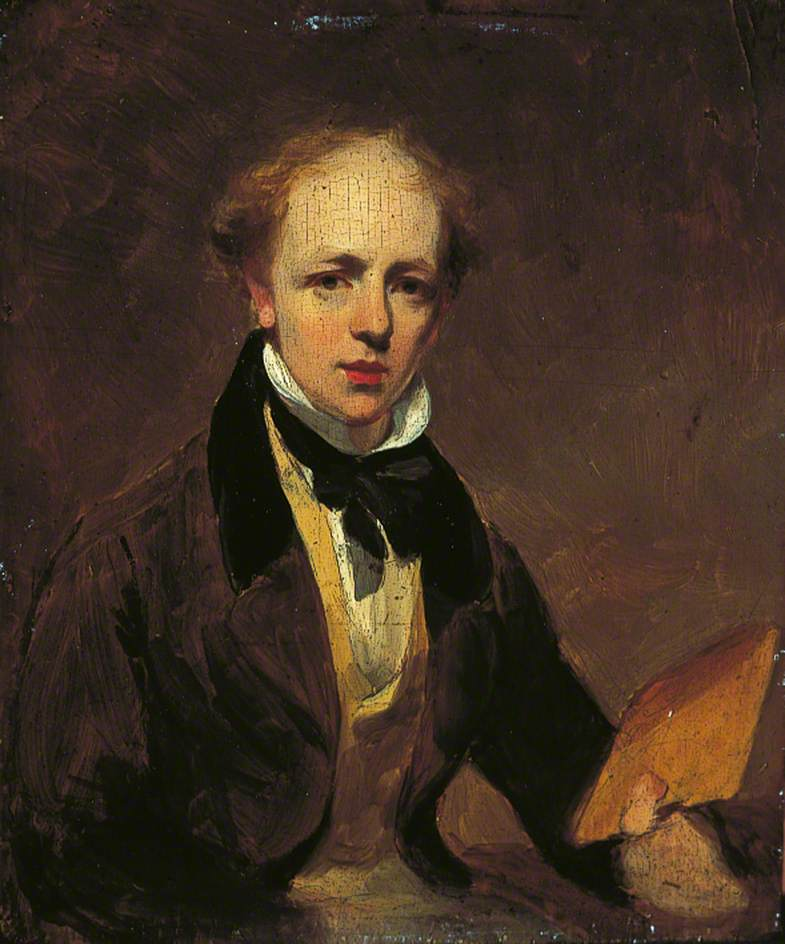
Self-portrait

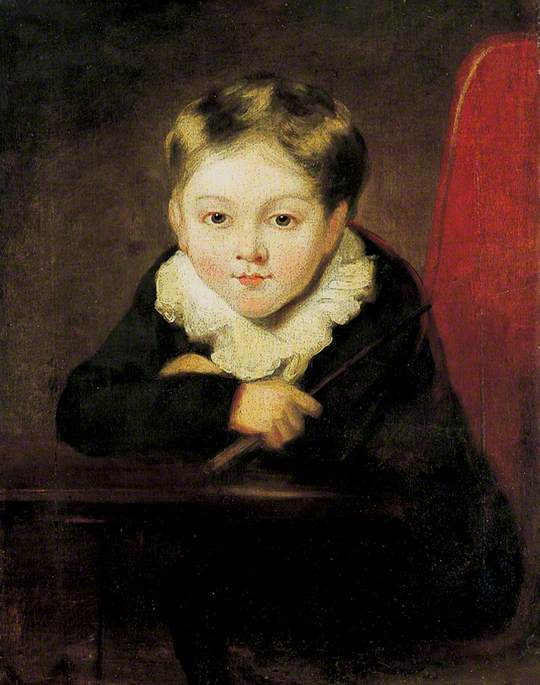
Portrait of the Artist's Son

William Robinson (1799–1839) was an English portrait-painter.

== Life ==
William Robinson was a native of Leeds, where he was born in 1799. He was at first apprenticed to a clock-dial enameller, but came to London in 1820, and was entered as a student at the Royal Academy. Robinson was also admitted to work in the studio of Sir Thomas Lawrence.

About 1823 he returned to Leeds, and obtained a very considerable practice there and in the neighbourhood. He was commissioned to paint some large full-length portraits for the United Service Club in London, including one of the Duke of Wellington. He likewise drew small portraits, the heads being carefully finished, and the remainder lightly touched after the manner of Henry Edridge.

He died at Leeds in August 1839, in his fortieth year.

== Works ==
- Edinburgh (Scottish National Portrait Gallery): John Arbuthnot (oil on canvas).
