= Mervyn Archdall (senior) =

Irish lawyer, landowner, official and politician

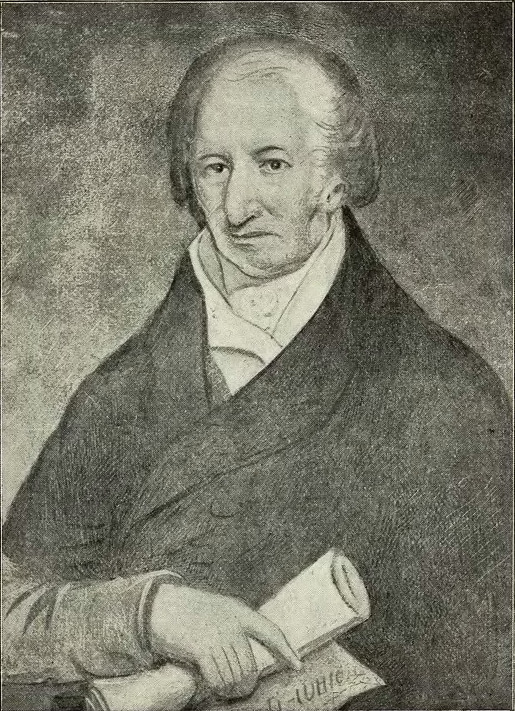
- Born: c. 1724
- Died: 18 June 1813 (aged 88–89)
- Alma mater: Trinity College Dublin
- Occupation: Politician
- Spouse(s): Mary Dawson
- Children: 8, including Mervyn Archdall
- Rank: colonel

Mervyn Archdall (c. 1724 – 18 June 1813) of Castle Archdale, Enniskillen, County Fermanagh and Trilleck, County Tyrone was a British High Sheriff and Member of Parliament.

== Early life ==
Archdall was born the only son of Nicholas Archdall (né Montgomery) of Derrygonnelly, County Fermanagh and his first wife Angel Archdall, the daughter and heiress of William Archdall of Castle Archdale.

He was educated at Trinity College Dublin and studied law at Lincoln's Inn in London. He succeeded his mother in 1745 and his father in 1763.

== Career ==
Archdall became the Governor of Fermanagh in 1756 and served as a member of the Parliament of Ireland for County Fermanagh from 1761 to 1800. He served as the High Sheriff of Fermanagh from 1773 to 1774.

After the Acts of Union, he became a co-opted MP in the first Parliament of the United Kingdom for County Fermanagh from 1801 to 1802, after which he handed the seat to his son and heir, Mervyn Archdall Jr.

== Personal life ==
In 1762, Archdall married the Hon. Mary Dawson, daughter of William Dawson, 1st Viscount Carlow and sister to John Dawson, 1st Earl of Portarlington. Together, Mervyn and Mary were the parents of four sons and eight daughters. In 1773 to 1778 he rebuilt Castle Archdale, which had been burned in the uprising of 1689 to 1690.
