= County Fermanagh (UK Parliament constituency) =

Parliamentary constituency in the United Kingdom, 1801–1885

Coordinates: 54.451°N 7.713°W

- Former county constituency for the House of Commons
- County: County Fermanagh

1801–1885
- Seats: 2
- Created from: County Fermanagh (IHC)
- Replaced by: North Fermanagh and South Fermanagh

County Fermanagh was a UK Parliament constituency in Ireland, returning two Members of Parliament.

== Boundaries ==
This constituency comprised the whole of County Fermanagh, except for the Borough of Enniskillen.

== Members of Parliament ==
Election	1st Member	1st Party	2nd Member	2nd Party	Note
1801, January 1	Mervyn Archdall	Tory	Viscount Cole		1801: Co-opted
1802, July 19	Mervyn Archdall	Tory	Viscount Cole		
1803, June 27	Mervyn Archdall	Tory	Hon. Lowry Cole		Viscount Cole entered the House of Lords as Baron Grinstead.
1823, March 8	Mervyn Archdall	Tory	Viscount Corry	Tory	Cole appointed Governor of Mauritius.
1831, May 16	Mervyn Archdall	Tory	Viscount Cole	Tory	
1834, June 27	Mervyn Edward Archdale	Tory	Viscount Cole	Tory	Archdall resigned.
1834, December	Mervyn Edward Archdale	Conservative	Viscount Cole	Conservative	
1840, 30 April	Mervyn Edward Archdale	Conservative	Sir Arthur Brooke	Conservative	Viscount Cole entered the House of Lords as Baron Grinstead.
1854, 29 December	Mervyn Edward Archdale	Conservative	Hon. Henry Cole	Conservative	Death of Brooke.
1874, 16 February	William Humphrys Archdale	Conservative	Hon. Henry Cole	Conservative	
1880, April 13	William Humphrys Archdale	Conservative	Viscount Crichton	Conservative	Last MPs for the constituency
1885	Constituency abolished				

== Elections ==
=== Elections in the 1830s ===
General election 1830: Fermanagh
Party	Candidate	Votes	%
Tory	Mervyn Archdall	685	34.4
Tory	Armar Lowry-Corry	563	28.3
Whig	Sir Henry Brooke, 1st Baronet of Colebrooke	467	23.4
Whig	Thomas Brooke	277	13.9
Majority		96	4.9
Turnout		1,015	98.4
Registered electors		1,032	
Tory hold			
Tory hold			

General election 1831: Fermanagh
Party	Candidate	Votes	%
Tory	Mervyn Archdall	Unopposed	
Tory	William Cole	Unopposed	
Registered electors		1,232	
Tory hold			
Tory hold			

General election 1832: Fermanagh
Party	Candidate	Votes	%
Tory	Mervyn Archdall	Unopposed	
Tory	William Cole	Unopposed	
Registered electors		1,429	
Tory hold			
Tory hold			

Archdall resigned, causing a by-election.

By-election, 27 June 1834: Fermanagh
Party	Candidate	Votes	%
Tory	Mervyn Edward Archdale	Unopposed	
Tory hold			

General election 1835: Fermanagh
Party	Candidate	Votes	%
Conservative	Mervyn Edward Archdale	Unopposed	
Conservative	William Cole	Unopposed	
Registered electors		1,484	
Conservative hold			
Conservative hold			

General election 1837: Fermanagh
Party	Candidate	Votes	%
Conservative	Mervyn Edward Archdale	Unopposed	
Conservative	William Cole	Unopposed	
Registered electors		1,864	
Conservative hold			
Conservative hold			

=== Elections in the 1840s ===
Cole succeeded to the peerage, becoming 3rd Earl of Enniskillen and causing a by-election.

By-election, 30 April 1840: Fermanagh
Party	Candidate	Votes	%	±%
Conservative	Arthur Brooke	Unopposed		
Conservative hold				

General election 1841: Fermanagh
Party	Candidate	Votes	%	±%
Conservative	Arthur Brooke	Unopposed		
Conservative	Mervyn Archdall	Unopposed		
Registered electors		2,271		
Conservative hold				
Conservative hold				

General election 1847: Fermanagh
Party	Candidate	Votes	%	±%
Conservative	Arthur Brooke	Unopposed		
Conservative	Mervyn Archdall	Unopposed		
Registered electors		2,193		
Conservative hold				
Conservative hold				

=== Elections in the 1850s ===
General election 1852: Fermanagh
Party	Candidate	Votes	%	±%
Conservative	Arthur Brooke	Unopposed		
Conservative	Mervyn Archdall	Unopposed		
Registered electors		3,497		
Conservative hold				
Conservative hold				

Brooke's death caused a by-election.

By-election, 29 December 1854: Fermanagh
Party	Candidate	Votes	%	±%
Conservative	Henry Cole	Unopposed		
Conservative hold				

General election 1857: Fermanagh
Party	Candidate	Votes	%	±%
Conservative	Henry Cole	Unopposed		
Conservative	Mervyn Archdall	Unopposed		
Registered electors		4,420		
Conservative hold				
Conservative hold				

General election 1859: Fermanagh
Party	Candidate	Votes	%	±%
Conservative	Henry Cole	Unopposed		
Conservative	Mervyn Archdall	Unopposed		
Registered electors		4,672		
Conservative hold				
Conservative hold				

=== Elections in the 1860s ===
General election 1865: Fermanagh
Party	Candidate	Votes	%	±%
Conservative	Henry Cole	Unopposed		
Conservative	Mervyn Archdall	Unopposed		
Registered electors		4,861		
Conservative hold				
Conservative hold				

General election 1868: Fermanagh
Party	Candidate	Votes	%	±%
Conservative	Henry Cole	Unopposed		
Conservative	Mervyn Archdall	Unopposed		
Registered electors		5,175		
Conservative hold				
Conservative hold				

=== Elections in the 1870s ===
General election 1874: Fermanagh
Party	Candidate	Votes	%	±%
Conservative	Henry Cole	2,285	32.0	N/A
Conservative	William Humphrys Archdale	2,205	30.9	N/A
Liberal	John Grey Vesey Porter	1,546	21.6	New
Liberal	Charles Robert Barton	1,111	15.5	New
Majority		659	9.3	N/A
Turnout		3,574 (est)	75.2 (est)	N/A
Registered electors		4,752		
Conservative hold		Swing	N/A	
Conservative hold		Swing	N/A	

=== Elections in the 1880s ===
General election 1880: Fermanagh
Party	Candidate	Votes	%	±%
Conservative	William Humphrys Archdale	2,479	36.7	+5.8
Conservative	Viscount Crichton	2,443	36.2	+4.2
Liberal	John Grey Vesey Porter	1,835	27.2	−9.9
Majority		608	9.0	−0.3
Turnout		4,314 (est)	90.3 (est)	+15.1
Registered electors		4,778		
Conservative hold		Swing	+5.1	
Conservative hold		Swing	+4.3	
