= William Cole, 3rd Earl of Enniskillen =

British politician (1807–1886)

The Right Honourable The Earl of Enniskillen FRS
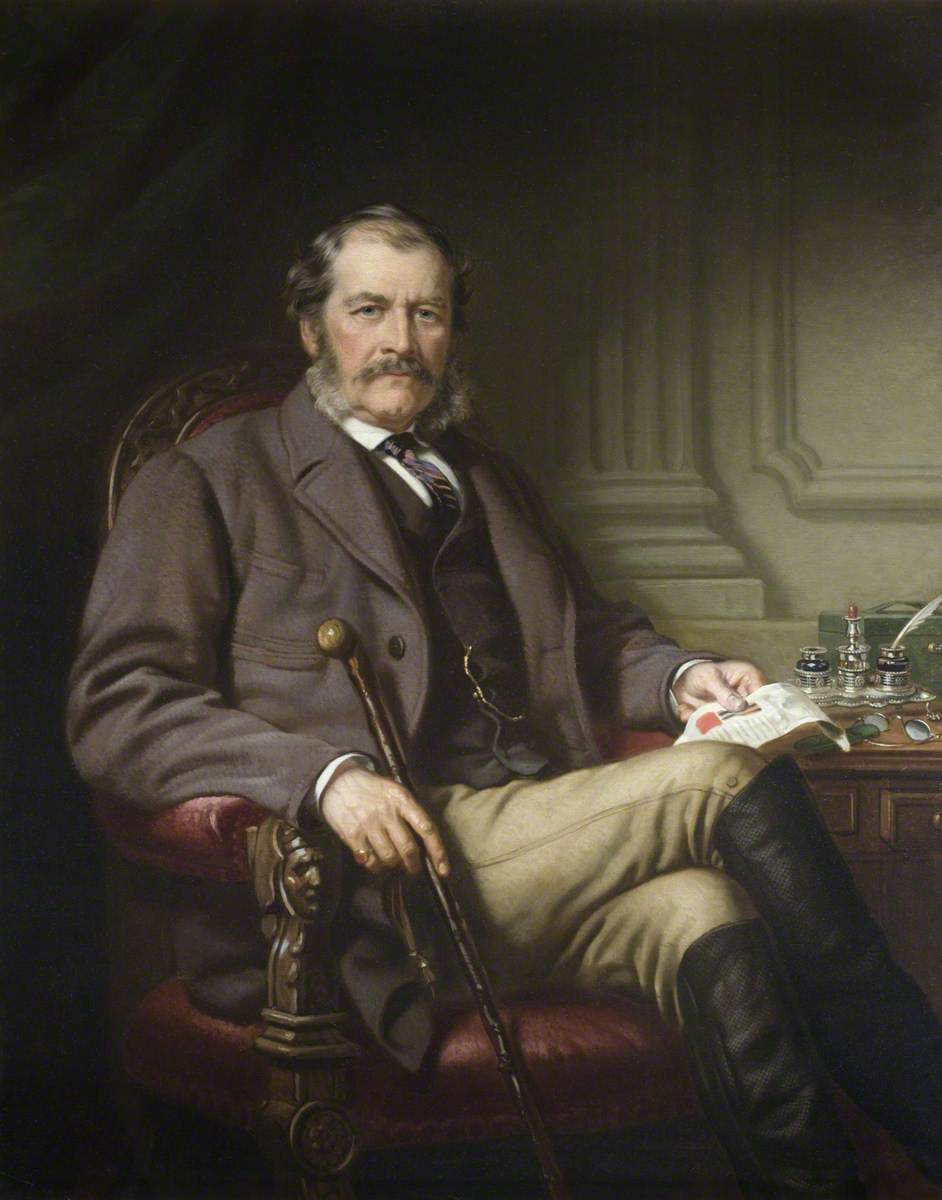

Member of the House of Lords Lord Temporal
- In office 1840–1886; Hereditary Peerage
- Preceded by: John Cole
- Succeeded by: Lowry Cole

Personal details
- Born: William Willoughby Cole; 25 January 1807
- Died: 26 November 1886 (aged 79)
- Party: Conservative
- Spouses: Jane Casamaijor (m. 1844; died 1855) The Hon. Mary Emma Brodrick (m. 1865)
- Children: John Willoughby Michael Cole, Viscount Cole; Lowry Cole, 4th Earl of Enniskillen; Lady Charlotte June Smith-Barry; Florence Mary Crichton, Countess Erne; The Hon. Arthur Edward Casamaijor Cole; Lady Alice Elizabeth Ashley; Lady Jane Evelyn Cole
- Parent(s): John Cole, 2nd Earl of Enniskillen (father); Lady Charlotte Paget (mother)
- Education: Harrow School; Christ Church, Oxford

William Willoughby Cole, 3rd Earl of Enniskillen, FRS (25 January 1807 – 12 November 1886) styled by the courtesy title Viscount Cole until 1840, was an Irish palaeontologist and Conservative Member of Parliament. He also served as the first Imperial Grand Master of the Orange Order from 1866 until his death. He was Grand Master of the Grand Orange Lodge of Ireland from 1846 until his death.

== Background and education ==
Cole was born into the Ulster branch of 'the Ascendancy', the Anglo-Irish aristocracy. He was the son of John Willoughby Cole, 2nd Earl of Enniskillen and his wife, Lady Charlotte Paget. Lord Cole was educated at Harrow and Christ Church, Oxford. In his youth he began to devote his leisure to the study and collection of fossil fishes, with his friend Sir Philip Grey Egerton, 10th Bt, and amassed a fine collection at Florence Court, his home just south-west of Enniskillen. This included many specimens that were described and figured by Agassiz and Egerton. This collection was subsequently acquired by the British Museum, and now resides at the Natural History Museum, London.

== Political career ==
Enniskillen was also involved in politics and (as Lord Cole) represented County Fermanagh in the House of Commons between 1831 and 1840, when he succeeded his father, to become the third Earl of Enniskillen, and entered the House of Lords as Baron Grinstead. In Dublin, he was a member of the Kildare Street Club.

== Family ==
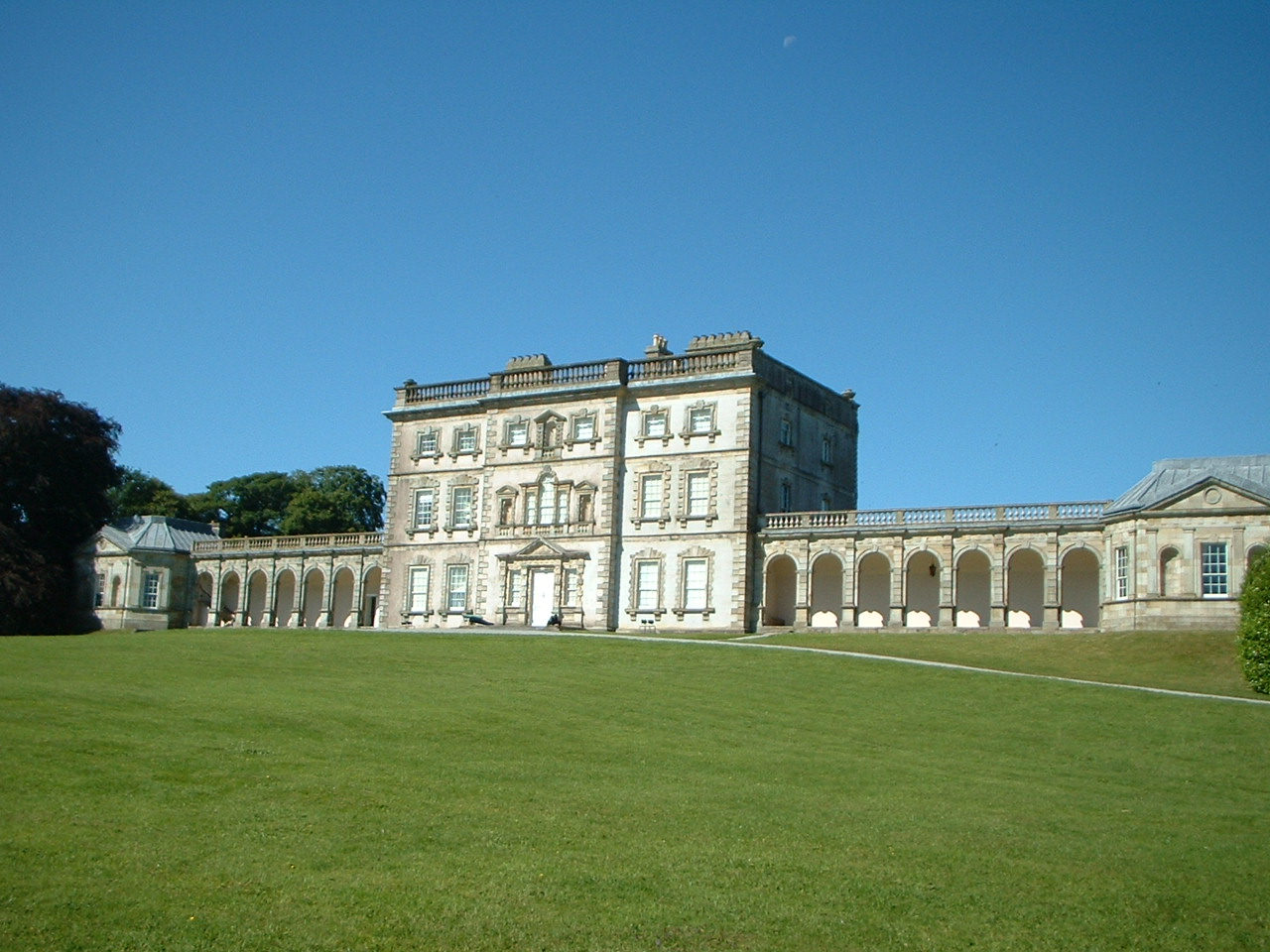
Florence Court, County Fermanagh

Lord Enniskillen married, firstly, Jane Casamaijor, daughter of James Casamaijor, in 1844, by whom he had seven children:

- John Willoughby Michael Cole, Viscount Cole (16 December 1844 – 15 April 1850)
- Lowry Egerton Cole, 4th Earl of Enniskillen (1845–1924)
- Lady Charlotte June Cole (10 May 1847 – 3 September 1933), married James Hugh Smith-Barry and had issue
- Lady Florence Mary Cole (5 August 1849 – 23 March 1924), married John Crichton, 4th Earl Erne and had issue
- The Hon. Arthur Edward Casamaijor Cole (9 March 1851 – 17 August 1908), married and had issue
- Lady Alice Elizabeth Cole (4 February 1853 – 25 August 1931), married Evelyn Ashley and had issue
- Lady Jane Evelyn Cole (21 April 1855 – 19 March 1941)

After her death in 1855 he married, secondly, The Hon. Mary Emma Brodrick, daughter of Charles Brodrick, 6th Viscount Midleton, in 1865. He died in November 1886, aged 79, and was succeeded in his titles by his second but eldest surviving son from his first marriage, Lowry. The Dowager Countess of Enniskillen died in 1896.

He owned a total of 30,000 acres in Fermanagh and Wiltshire.

== Notes ==
Parliament of the United Kingdom
Preceded by Mervyn Archdall; Viscount Corry	Member of Parliament for County Fermanagh; 1831–1840; With: Mervyn Archdall 1831–1835; Mervyn Edward Archdale 1835–1840	Succeeded by Mervyn Edward Archdale; Sir Arthur Brooke, Bt
Peerage of Ireland
Preceded by John Willoughby Cole	Earl of Enniskillen; 1840–1886	Succeeded by Lowry Egerton Cole
