= Mervyn Archdall (British Army officer, born 1763) =

Irish soldier in the British Army, and politician

General Mervyn Archdall
- Born: 27 April 1763; County Fermanagh
- Died: 26 July 1839 (aged 76); Castle Archdale, County Fermanagh
- Relatives: Mervyn Archdall (father); Sir Edward Archdale (nephew)
- Military career
- Allegiance: United Kingdom
- Branch: British Army
- Service years: 1782–1839
- Rank: General
- Commands: 12th Light Dragoons; Lieutenant-Governor of the Isle of Wight; Governor of County Fermanagh
- Conflicts: French Revolutionary Wars; Egypt campaign; Battle of Mandora; Napoleonic Wars

General Mervyn Archdall (27 April 1763 – 26 July 1839) was an Irish officer in the British Army and Member of Parliament for County Fermanagh in the Parliament of the United Kingdom.

He was the eldest son of Mervyn Archdall (1724?–1813) of Castle Archdall, Enniskillen, Fermanagh, an MP in the Parliament of Ireland for nearly 40 years. He succeeded his father in 1813, inheriting Castle Archdale house.

Archdall joined the British Army as a cornet in the 12th Dragoons and rose through the ranks in that regiment to that of full general on 27 May 1825. He had command of the regiment under Sir Ralph Abercromby during the Egyptian campaign, losing his right arm in an impromptu cavalry charge at Lake Mareotis in 1801. As a major-general he afterwards spent time on the staff in Ireland.

In 1833, he and wife Jane were passengers in a carriage accident caused by flooding near Castle Saunderson in Cavan.

He was MP for County Fermanagh in the Parliament of the UK from 1802 to 1834 following his father, who had been a co-opted member in 1801.

He was appointed Lieutenant-Governor of the Isle of Wight for life in 1815. He was also Governor of County Fermanagh (1813–1831), Grand Master of the Orange Order (1818–1822) and a Trustee of the Irish Linen Board.

He had married Jane, the daughter of Gustavus Hume Rochfort, MP. He had one son and daughter (both illegitimate). His estate passed to his brother Colonel William Archdall (1768–1857) and thereafter to his nephew Edward Mervyn Archdale, MP. He died in 1839.
