= Sir Charles Hume, 4th Baronet =

Sir Charles Hume, 4th Baronet (died c. 1750) was a baronet of the Baronetage of Ireland. The baronetage became extinct on his death without an heir.
