= Richard Cole (politician) =

Irish politician

Richard Cole (c. 1671 – June 1729) was an Irish politician.

Cole sat in the Irish House of Commons as the Member of Parliament for St Canice from 1707 to 1713, before representing Enniskillen between 1713 and his death in 1729. He was married in 1968 to Penelope Coote.

Parliament of Ireland
Preceded by Richard Connell; Hon. Christopher Wandesford	Member of Parliament for St Canice; 1707–1713; With: Richard Connell	Succeeded by Sir Standish Hartstonge, Bt; Sir Robert Maude, Bt
Preceded by John Cole; John Corry	Member of Parliament for Enniskillen; 1713–1729; With: John Cole (1713–1727); James Saunderson (1727–1729)	Succeeded by James Saunderson; John Cole
