= Castle Archdale =

Former estate in Northern Ireland

Coordinates: 54°28′40″N 7°43′56″W

Castle Archdale in County Fermanagh, Northern Ireland, is a former estate on the shores of Lough Erne Lower, the key feature of which today is Castle Archdale Country Park. There is also a caravan park. The former estate is situated near Lisnarick and Irvinestown, in the broader hinterland of Enniskillen, and the park is owned and run by the Northern Ireland Environment Agency.

== History ==
Castle Archdale in the 1920s

The park was once an estate owned by the Archdale family, who arrived in 1614 during the Plantation of Ulster. The castle was built in 1615 by John Archdale (died 1621), a Plantation undertaker from Norfolk. The castle was built on a T-plan with a defensive bawn 66 ft by 64 ft and 15 ft high with flankers at each corner. He was succeeded by his son, Edward. The castle was destroyed for the first time by Rory Maguire during the Irish Rebellion of 1641. It was destroyed again in 1689, during the Williamite wars. The ruins of the old castle itself are situated in the old area of the park.

In 1773 a mansion was built approximately 1 mile south west of the original castle ruins. During World War II it was requisitioned as the wartime headquarters for RAF Castle Archdale. The manor fell out of use after the war, and was finally demolished in 1970. All that now remains is a huge cobbled courtyard surrounded by white outbuildings, housing an information centre and tearooms.

=== World War II ===
During World War II, RAF Castle Archdale housed up to 2,500 people and was a major base for flying boats. PBY Catalinas and Short Sunderlands flew from Castle Archdale to protect Atlantic shipping from German U-boats. Today's caravan site sits on the concrete maintenance area where aircraft were serviced, and a museum in the park holds exhibits from the World War II period.

Although Ireland maintained neutrality in World War II, a secret agreement between Eamon de Valera and the United Kingdom government allowed aircraft from RAF Castle Archdale to use the Donegal Corridor. This short strip of airspace over Ireland allowed aircraft to fly directly to the Atlantic, from Belleek in Northern Ireland via Ballyshannon in Ireland. This avoided a long detour north towards Derry, and then west into the Atlantic, and extended the range of protection that the Castle Archdale aircraft could offer to the Atlantic convoys.

In May 1941, two Catalinas from Castle Archdale were instrumental in the sinking of the German battleship Bismarck. They spotted the damaged warship in the Atlantic, while it was attempting to return to Brest in France for repairs, after having been damaged by torpedo attack by aircraft from HMS Victorious. This allowed Fairey Swordfish aircraft from HMS Ark Royal to further attack with torpedoes, causing fatal damage to Bismarck.

== Transport ==
- There is a ferry to White Island which leaves from Castle Archdale marina.
- Castle Archdale private railway station opened on 13 June 1866, but finally closed on 3 July 1950.

== Sport ==
A range of water and land based activities are available from a commercial outlet located in the marina car park.

== Links ==
- Culture Northern Ireland
- Castle Archdale official website
