= Stewart baronets =

Set index for Stewart baronets

There have been eighteen baronetcies for persons with the surname Stewart, eleven in the Baronetage of Nova Scotia, one in the Baronetage of Ireland and six in the Baronetage of the United Kingdom.

- Stewart baronets of Ramelton (1623)
- Stewart baronets of Corsewall (1627): see Earl of Galloway
- Stewart baronets (1628): see Earl Castle Stewart
- Stewart baronets of Ochiltree (1628): see Lord Ochiltree
- Stewart baronets of Traquair (1633): see Earl of Traquair
- Stewart baronets of Greenock and Blackhall (1667): see Shaw-Stewart Baronets
- Stewart baronets of Castlemilk (1668)
- Stewart baronets (1681): see Earl of Moray
- Stewart baronets of Blair and Balcaskie (1683): see Drummond-Stewart baronets
- Stewart baronets of Allanbank (1687): see Steuart baronets
- Stewart baronets of Burray (1687): see Earl of Galloway
- Stewart baronets of Tillicoultry (1707)
- Stewart baronets of Athenree (1803)
- Stewart baronets of South Kensington (1881)
- Stewart baronets of Fingask (1920)
- Stewart baronets of Balgownie in Bearsden (1920)
- Stewart baronets of Stewartby (1937)
- Stewart baronets of Strathgarry (1960)

== See also ==
- Steuart baronets of Coltness
- Stuart baronets
- Henderson-Stewart baronets
- MacTaggart-Stewart baronets
- Stewart-Clark baronets
