= Londonderry Artillery =

Could refer to:

- Londonderry Artillery Militia, formed 1855, merged into Mid-Ulster Artillery Militia in 1875
- Londonderry Artillery (Southern Division) Royal Artillery, formed 1889, originally the Londonderry Light Infantry Militia, became Londonderry Royal Garrison Artillery (Militia) in 1902
