= William Fitzwilliam Lenox-Conyngham =

Irish soldier and British Army officer (1824–1906)

Sir William Fitzwilliam Lenox-Conyngham KCB DL JP
- Born: 24 April 1824
- Died: 4 December 1906 (aged 82); England
- Military career
- Allegiance: United Kingdom
- Branch: British Army/Militia
- Rank: Lieutenant-Colonel (honorary Colonel)

Colonel Sir William Fitzwilliam Lenox-Conyngham, KCB DL JP (25 April 1824 – 4 December 1906) was an Irish militia officer.

The eldest son of William Lenox-Conyngham and Charlotte Melosina Staples, third daughter of the Rt Hon. John Staples (of Lissan House), he was born at Springhill, County Londonderry and was a Deputy Lieutenant, Justice of the Peace and High Sheriff of County Tyrone. He married Laura Calvert Arbuthnot (1830-1917) and had thirteen children; William Arbuthnot Lenox-Conyngham, Rev. George Hugh Lenox-Conyngham, Elizabeth Mary Clark, John Staples Molesworth Lenox-Conyngham, Charlotte Melosina Lenox-Conyngham, Arthur Beresford Lenox-Conyngham, Sir Gerald Ponsonby Lenox-Conyngham, Ernest Lenox-Conyngham, Edward Fraser Lenox-Conyngham, Hubert Lenox-Conyngham, Alwyn Lenox-Conyngham, Laura Eleanor Duff and (Harriet) Alice Katherine Lenox-Conyngham (a passenger on the RMS Titanic).

He served as a Lieutenant in the 88th Regiment of Foot (Connaught Rangers), and after retiring from the Regular Army he was commissioned as a Major in the disembodied Londonderry Militia in 1848 and promoted to Lieutenant-Colonel in 1850. The regiment was reformed as the Londonderry Light Infantry and embodied for home defence during the Crimean War under Lenox-Conyngham as Lieutenant-Colonel Commandant, later with the honorary rank of Colonel. In 1881 he was rewarded with a knighthood (KCB). In 1882 the regiment was converted to artillery as 9th Brigade, North Irish Division, Royal Artillery, and Lenox-Conyngham remained in command until his retirement on 28 April 1886.

He also, after 1882, accepted the Agency of the Drapers' Company in Londonderry and in this capacity lived in the Manor House, Moneymore. When, after the passing of the Ashbourne Act, the lands of the Drapers' Company were sold, Sir William and his family went for a short time to live in England, where Sir William died in 1906.
