= St Martin's Church, Bulmer =

Church in North Yorkshire, England

Coordinates: 54°05′59″N 0°55′55″W

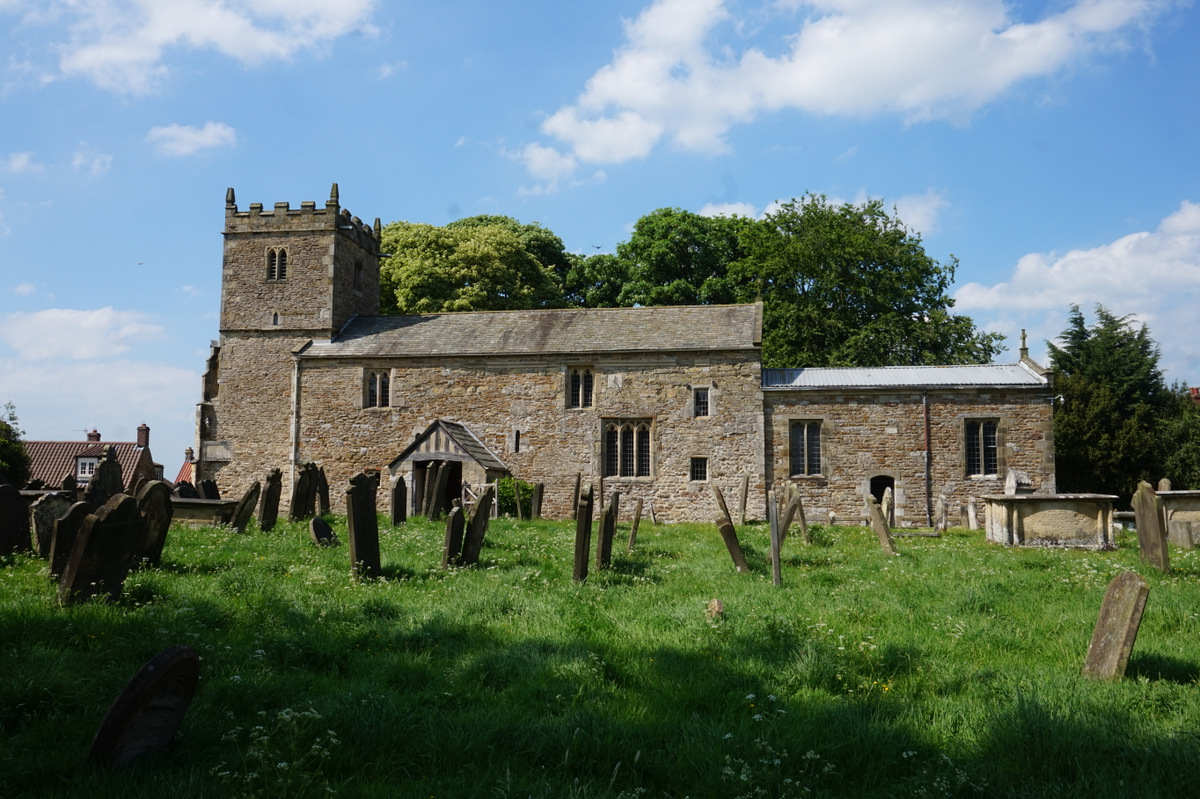
The church, in 2017

St Martin's Church is the parish church of Bulmer, North Yorkshire, a village in England.

The oldest part of the church is the nave, which dates from the 11th century, and may be before or after the Norman Conquest. The chancel dates from the early 12th century, while the south nave door was added in the second half of the century. Around 1400, a north chapel was added, the tower and quire were rebuilt, and the nave walls were heightened. The upper part of the tower was rebuilt in 1637, and buttresses were added. In the 18th century, the chapel was demolished, and new windows were inserted in the walls of the nave. A porch was added around 1800. In 1893, James Demaine and Walter Brierley restored the church, during which process they rebuilt the chancel. The church was Grade I listed in 1954.

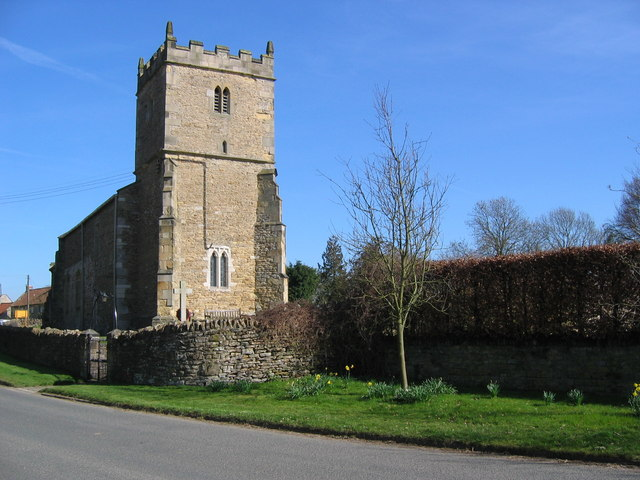
West end of the church

The church is built of limestone and sandstone, with a roof of Westmorland slate to the nave and corrugated iron to the chancel. The church consists of a nave, a south porch, a two-bay chancel, and a west tower. The tower has three stages, a string course, diagonal buttresses, a small lancet window, double lancet bell openings, and an embattled parapet with corner pinnacles and a datestone. The porch has a late 12th-century doorway with two orders on moulded capitals. Two round-headed 11th-century windows survive on the south side of the nave, while the 15th- and 18th-century windows have square heads. In the porch is a memorial to Christopher Thompson, blacksmith at Castle Howard, who died in 1773.

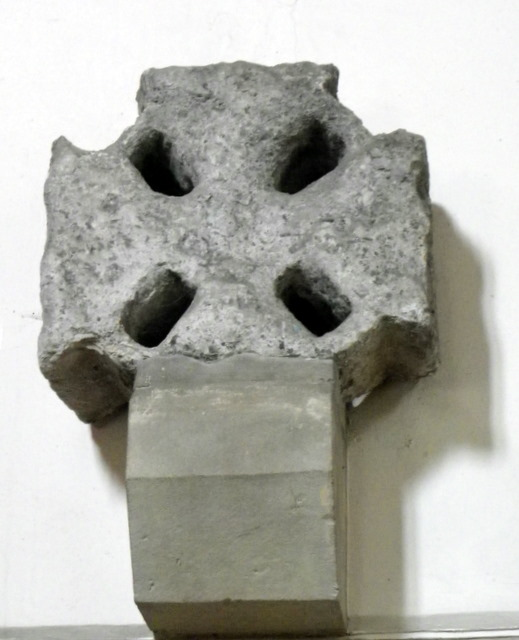
The Saxon cross-head

Inside the church is the head of a Saxon wheel-cross. There is an effigy of John de Bulmer, who died in the 1270s, and a slab commemorating Ralph Bulmer, who died in 1461. The 18th-century pulpit is octagonal, while there is a 13th-century font, with a circular bowl, and an octagonal stem and base. The rood screen is 15th century.

== See also ==
- Grade I listed buildings in North Yorkshire (district)
- Listed buildings in Bulmer, North Yorkshire
