= North Irish Division, Royal Artillery =

North Irish Division, RA
- Cap Badge of the Royal Regiment of Artillery
- Active: 4 April 1882–1 July 1889
- Country: United Kingdom
- Branch: British Army
- Type: Administrative division
- Part of: Royal Artillery
- Garrison/HQ: Carrickfergus

The North Irish Division, Royal Artillery, was an administrative grouping of garrison units of the Royal Artillery and Artillery Militia in Ireland from 1882 to 1889.

== Organisation ==
Under General Order 72 of 4 April 1882 the Royal Artillery (RA) broke up its existing administrative brigades (Note: In RA terminology, a 'brigade' was a group of independent batteries grouped together for administrative rather than tactical purposes, the officer in command being usually a lieutenant-colonel rather than a brigadier-general or major-general, the ranks usually associated with command of an infantry or cavalry brigade.) of garrison artillery (7th–11th Brigades, RA) and assigned the individual batteries to 11 new territorial divisions. These divisions were purely administrative and recruiting organisations, not field formations. For the first time the part-time Artillery Militia were associated with the regulars. The Regular Army batteries were grouped into one brigade, usually of nine sequentially-numbered batteries and a depot battery. For these units the divisions represented recruiting districts – batteries could be serving anywhere in the British Empire and their only connection to brigade headquarters (HQ) was for the supply of drafts and recruits. The artillery militia units (sometimes referred to as regiments) already comprised a number of batteries, and were redesignated as brigades, losing their county titles in the process.

== Composition ==
North Irish Division, RA, listed as 10th in order of precedence, was organised with the following composition:

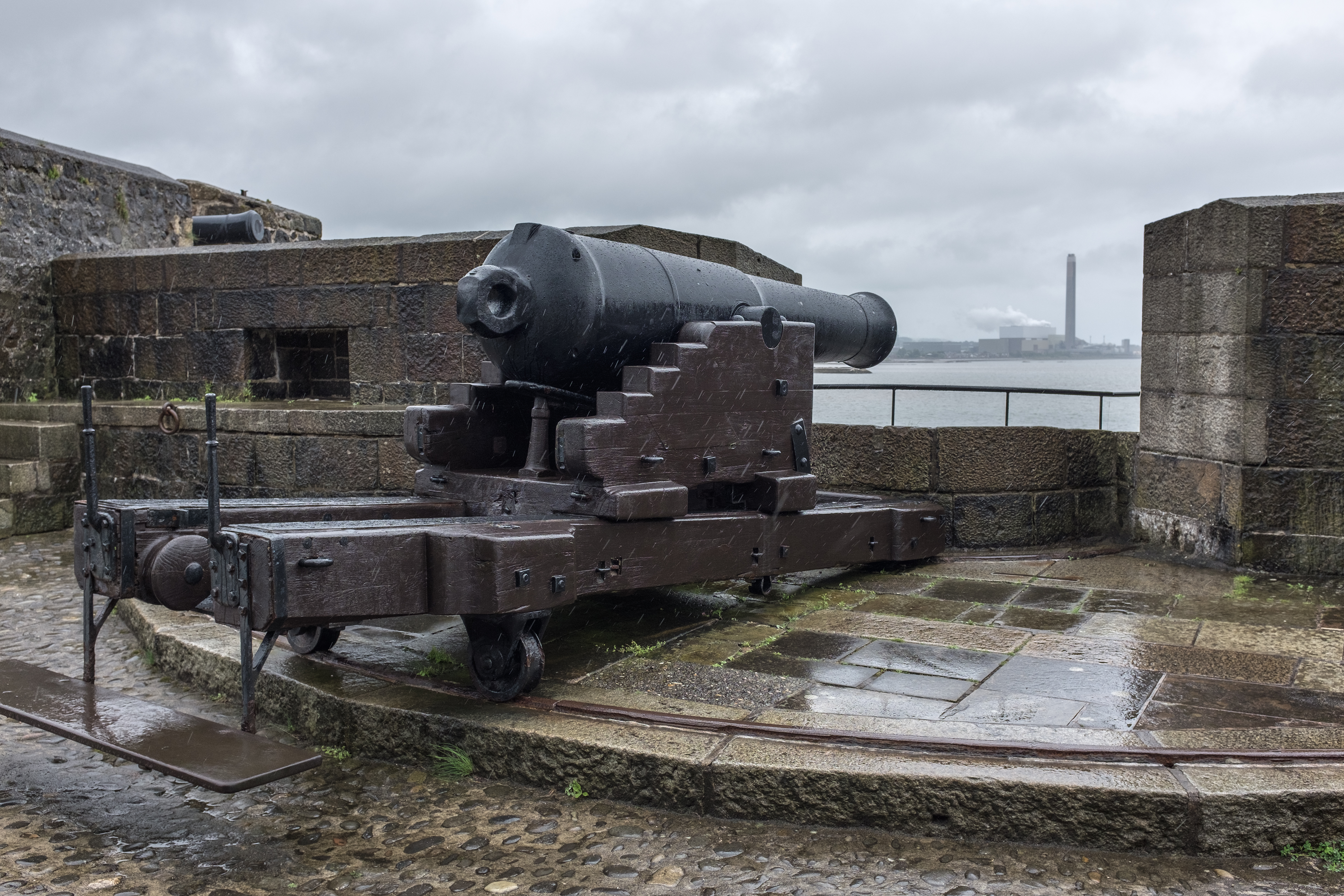
Gun position at Carrickfergus Castle, headquarters of North Irish Division, RA.

- HQ at Carrickfergus
- 1st Brigade
  - HQ at Derry
  - 1st Bty at Sandown, Isle of Wight – formerly 16th Bty, 11th Bde
  - 2nd Bty at Royal Artillery Barracks, Woolwich – formerly 5th Bty, 7th Bde
  - 3rd Bty at Portsmouth – formerly 15th Bty, 8th Bde
  - 4th Bty at Rangoon – formerly 9th Bty, 9th Bde
  - 5th Bty at Mhow – formerly 5th Bty, 11th Bde
  - 6th Bty at Gibraltar – formerly 18th Bty, 10th Bde
  - 7th Bty at Gibraltar – formerly 13th Bty, 10th Bde
  - 8th Bty at Gibraltar – formerly 14th Bty, 10th Bde
  - 9th Bty at Gibraltar – formerly 15th Bty, 10th Bde
  - Depot Bty at Belfast – formerly Depot Bty, 3rd Bde
- 2nd Brigade at Carrickfergus – formerly Antrim Artillery (8 btys)
- 3rd Brigade at Letterkenny – formerly Donegal Artillery (6 btys)
- 4th Brigade at Dublin – formerly Dublin City Artillery Militia (4 btys)
- 5th Brigade at Galway – formerly Galway Artillery Militia (4 btys) – disbanded 1888
- 6th Brigade at Dungannon – formerly Mid-Ulster Artillery Militia (5 btys)
- 7th Brigade at Wicklow – formerly Wicklow Artillery Militia (4 btys)
- 8th Brigade at Sligo – formerly Duke of Connaught's Own Sligo Artillery Militia (4 Btys)
- 9th Brigade at Derry – formerly Londonderry Light Infantry Militia (6 Btys)

== Disbandment ==
On 1 July 1889 the garrison artillery was reorganised again into three large territorial divisions of garrison artillery (Eastern, Southern and Western) and one of mountain artillery. The assignment of units to them seemed geographically arbitrary, with all the Irish militia units being grouped in the Southern Division, for example, but this related to where the need for coastal artillery was greatest, rather than where the units recruited. The regular batteries were distributed across most of the divisions and completely renumbered.

== See also ==
- Royal Garrison Artillery
- List of Royal Artillery Divisions 1882–1902
- South Irish Division, Royal Artillery
- Southern Division, Royal Artillery
