= Hubert Montgomery =

British civil servant and diplomat

Sir Charles Hubert Montgomery KCMG KCVO CB (24 August 1876 – 2 December 1942) was a British civil servant and diplomat.

== Early life and education ==
Montgomery was born on 24 August 1876. He was the fifth son of the politician Hugh Montgomery and was born at Blessingbourne House, near Fivemiletown, County Tyrone, Ireland. He was educated at Charterhouse School, then an all-boys independent boarding school in Surrey, England.

== Career ==
In 1900, Montgomery joined the Foreign Office as a clerk. From 1904 to 1907 he served as Private Secretary to the Under-Secretary of State for Foreign Affairs, and from 1907 to 1910 he was précis writer to the Foreign Secretary, with a brief interlude in 1908 when he served as Assistant Private Secretary to Prime Minister Sir Henry Campbell-Bannerman.

He was secretary of the Earl Marshal's office for the Coronation of King George V in 1911, for which he was appointed Commander of the Royal Victorian Order (CVO), and in 1913 he was appointed Marshal of the Ceremonies. In 1918 he was on the staff of the Earl of Reading's embassy to the United States and in 1919 he was appointed Chief Clerk and Assistant Secretary of the Foreign Office. In 1922 he was promoted to Assistant Under-Secretary of State for Foreign Affairs and in 1930 Deputy Under-Secretary of State.

In 1933 he received his first and only senior overseas posting when he was appointed Envoy Extraordinary and Minister Plenipotentiary at The Hague. He held this post until his retirement in 1938.

== Honours ==
Montgomery was appointed Companion of the Order of the Bath (CB) in the 1920 New Year War Honours, Knight Commander of the Order of St Michael and St George (KCMG) in the 1927 New Year Honours, and Knight Commander of the Royal Victorian Order (KCVO) in 1930.
