= Listed buildings in Bulmer, North Yorkshire =

Bulmer is a civil parish in the county of North Yorkshire, England. It contains 13 listed buildings that are recorded in the National Heritage List for England. Of these, three are listed at Grade I, the highest of the three grades, and the others are at Grade II, the lowest grade. The parish contains the village of Bulmer and the surrounding area. Most of the listed buildings are in the village, and consist of houses, cottages, a village hall, a church and items in the churchyard. Outside the village are a monument and a gateway to Castle Howard.

== Key ==
Grade	Criteria
I	Buildings of exceptional interest, sometimes considered to be internationally important
II	Buildings of national importance and special interest

== Buildings ==
Name and location	Photograph	DateArch Cottage	Notes	Grade
St Martin's Church; 54.09984°N 0.93197°W		11th century	The church has been altered and extended through the centuries, including rebuilding the chancel in 1898. It is built in limestone and sandstone, with a roof of Westmorland slate to the nave and corrugated iron to the chancel. The church consists of a nave, a south porch, a chancel, and a west tower. The tower has three stages, a string course, diagonal buttresses, a small lancet window, double lancet bell openings, and an embattled parapet with corner pinnacles and a datestone. The porch has a late 12th-century doorway with two orders on moulded capitals.	I
Tomb of Iveson W - and family 54.09976°N 0.93175°W	—	1717–19	The tomb is in the churchyard of St Martin's church to the south of the priest's door. It is a chest tomb in limestone on a moulded plinth. The tomb has a bowed face with an inscription, flanked by pairs of attached Tuscan columns, and on the top is a moulded slab.	II
Carrmire Gates, wall and end turrets 54.10748°N 0.91204°W		1726	An entrance to the grounds of Castle Howard, it is in limestone, and was designed by Nicholas Hawksmoor. The gateway has a round arch with a triple keystone and an open pediment, flanked by square rusticated piers, surmounted by six pyramids. On each side is an embattled wall extending for about 30 metres (98 ft), and ending in mock medieval turrets, with two stages, cruciform arrow slits and embattled parapets.	I
Illegible headstone 54.09973°N 0.93182°W	—	Early to mid 18th century	The headstone is in the churchyard of St Martin's church to the south of the priest's door. It is in limestone, and has a moulded plinth. The headstone consists of a rectangular plaque with a moulded entablature, carrying a segmental pediment with a stylised four-petal flower on each side of the base. The inscription is illegible.	II
Tomb of John Turner; 54.09975°N 0.93163°W	—	1738	The tomb is in the churchyard of St Martin's church to the south of the southeast corner of the church. It is a chest tomb in limestone and has an oval inscribed plaque on a rectangular face, with shell motifs in the corners, flanked by fluted pilasters carrying a moulded slab.	II
Chapel Cottage and Chapel View; 54.10008°N 0.93020°W		Mid to late 18th century	A row of three cottages in limestone, with a pantile roof, gable coping and shaped kneelers. There are two storeys and five bays. On the front are two doorways with divided fanlights. The windows are a mix of casements and horizontally-sliding sashes, some windows are blocked, and all have channelled lintels.	II
Chapel Farmhouse; 54.10000°N 0.93043°W	—	Mid to late 18th century	The farmhouse is in limestone, and has a swept pantile roof with gable coping. There is a single storey, and two bays, and a lower single-storey former barn to the right. The doorway has a divided fanlight, and the windows are casements.	II
Church Cottage; 54.09991°N 0.93080°W	—	Late 18th century	A row of three cottages in limestone, later combined into one house, with a pantile roof, gable coping and shaped kneelers. There are two storeys and five bays. On the front is a porch, and the windows are a mix of casements and horizontally-sliding sashes, some windows are blocked, and all have channelled lintels.	II
The Old Rectory; 54.10023°N 0.93156°W	—	Late 18th century	The house is in limestone, with the front faced in brick, a dentilled eaves course, and a swept pantile roof with gable coping and shaped kneelers. There are two storeys, five bays, flanking single-storey extensions, and rear outshuts under catslide roofs. The doorway has fluted pilasters, and a moulded pediment, and the windows are sashes with lintels and keystones.	II
Grange Cottage; 54.10061°N 0.92996°W		Late 18th to early 19th century	The house is in limestone with a French tile roof. There are two storeys, two bays, and a cross-wing at the rear. In the centre is a doorway, and the windows are sashes with channelled lintels.	II
Arch Cottage; 54.10089°N 0.93009°W		Early 19th century	A reading room, later a private house, in limestone with a Welsh slate roof, gable coping and shaped kneelers. There are two storeys and three bays. The porch has a wide arch, and the windows are casements with tooled channelled wedge lintels.	II
Village Hall; 54.10198°N 0.92926°W		1840	A school, later a village hall, in limestone with a Welsh slate roof. There is a single storey, a main block of three bays, and lower flanking wings. The doorway is in the left wing, and elsewhere are sash windows in dressed architraves with lintels and keystones.	II
Monument to the 7th Earl of Carlisle; 54.09471°N 0.90876°W		1869	The monument commemorating the 7th Earl of Carlisle was designed by F. P. Cockerell. It is in granite and sandstone and consists of a tall column with garlands hanging down on the north and south sides, a capital carved with scrolls, heads and acanthus leaves, and surmounted by a gilt-bronze tripod. The column stands on a base approached by steps, with rusticated quoins, an inscription and a plaque, on a platform with knights' helmets on bases at the corners.	I
