= Hugh Montgomery (Northern Ireland politician) =

Hugh de Fellenberg Montgomery (1844–1924) was an Ulster Unionist Party member of the Senate of Northern Ireland from 1922 until his death in 1924.

He was the son of Hugh Severin Montgomery of Leamington Spa, Warwickshire and educated at Christ Church, Oxford, graduating BA in 1868. His father died the year he was born and he inherited his Blessingbourne estate near Fivemiletown, County Tyrone. There he rebuilt Blessingbourne House, which was started soon after his marriage and completed in 1874. The architect was Frederick Pepys Cockerell and the house has an Elizabethan look.

He was a magistrate and Deputy Lieutenant of Tyrone and appointed High Sheriff of Fermanagh for 1871 and High Sheriff of Tyrone for 1888. He participated as an Ulster delegate to the 1917–18 Irish Convention.

Among his sons were the civil servant and diplomat Sir Hubert Montgomery, General Hugh Maude de Fellenberg Montgomery, and Field Marshal Archibald Montgomery-Massingberd.
