= Londonderry Militia =

Auxiliary unit of the British Army

Londonderry Militia Londonderry Light Infantry 9th Brigade, North Irish Division, RA Londonderry Artillery (Southern Division, RA) Londonderry RGA (M)
- Active: April 1793–October 1909
- Country: Ireland (1793–1800); United Kingdom (1801–1909)
- Branch: Militia
- Role: Infantry/Garrison Artillery
- Size: 10 companies/6 batteries
- Part of: North Irish Division, Royal Artillery; Southern Division, Royal Artillery
- Garrison/HQ: Derry
- Engagements: Irish Rebellion of 1798: Gorey; Curragh; Battle of Tubberneering; Battle of New Ross; Battle of Antrim; Battle of Arklow; Battle of Foulksmills; Blackmore Hill; Battle of Vinegar Hill

Commanders
- Notable commanders: Robert Stewart, Viscount Castlereagh

The Londonderry Militia, later the Londonderry Light Infantry, was an Irish Militia regiment raised in County Londonderry in 1793 under the command of Lord Castlereagh. It saw action during the Irish Rebellion of 1798. It joined the Royal Inniskilling Fusiliers in 1881 but was soon converted into a militia artillery unit before being disbanded in 1909.

== Background ==
Although there are scattered references to town guards in 1584, no organised militia existed in Ireland before 1660. After that date, some militia forces were organised in the reign of King Charles II but it was not until 1715 that the Irish Militia came under statutory authority. During the 18th Century there were various Volunteer Associations and unofficial militia units controlled by the landowners, concerned mainly with internal security. During the War of American Independence, the threat of invasion by the Americans' allies, France and Spain, appeared to be serious. While most of the Regular Army was fighting overseas, the coasts of England and Wales were defended by the embodied Militia, but Ireland had no equivalent force. The Parliament of Ireland passed a Militia Act, but this failed to create an effective force. However it opened the way for the paramilitary Irish Volunteers to fill the gap. The Volunteers were outside the control of either the parliament or the Dublin Castle administration. When the invasion threat receded they diminished in numbers but remained a political force. On the outbreak of the French Revolutionary War In 1793, the Irish administration passed an effective Militia Act that created an official Irish Militia, while the paramilitary volunteers were essentially banned. The new act was based on existing English precedents, with the men conscripted by ballot to fill county quotas (paid substitutes were permitted) and the officers having to meet certain property qualifications.

== Londonderry Militia ==
=== French Revolutionary War ===
County Londonderry was given a quota of 560 men to find, to be organised into a battalion of ten companies, and it was embodied for duty soon afterwards. The Hon Robert Stewart (Viscount Castlereagh from 1798), a member of the Parliament of Ireland was appointed Lieutenant-Colonel of the regiment.

The French Revolutionary and Napoleonic Wars saw the British and Irish militia embodied for a whole generation, becoming regiments of full-time professional soldiers (though restricted to service in Britain or Ireland respectively), which the regular army increasingly saw as a prime source of recruits. They served in coast defences, manned garrisons, guarded prisoners of war, and carried out internal security duties.

By April 1794 the Londonderry Militia was quartered at Drogheda, with one company detached to Navan and one to Kilcullen Bridge. Anxiety about a possible French invasion grew during the autumn of 1796 and preparations were made for field operations. A large French expeditionary force appeared in Bantry Bay on 21 December and troops from all over Ireland were marched towards the threatened area. Soon afterwards news arrived that the French fleet had been scattered by the winter storms. Several ships had been wrecked and none of the French troops succeeded in landing; there was no sign of a rising by the United Irishmen. The invasion was called off on 29 December, and the troop concentration was dispersed in early 1797.

Early in 1797 the light companies of the militia were detached to join composite battalions drawn from several militia regiments. The Londonderry contingent was attached to the 2nd Light Battalion, stationed at Bandon, County Cork. The militia regiments were each issued with two light six-pounder 'battalion guns', with the gun detachments trained by the Royal Artillery. When the militiamen of 1793 reached the end of their four-year enlistment in 1797, most of the Irish regiments were able to maintain their numbers through re-enlistments (for a bounty). The Londonderry Militia was augmented in July 1797 and its establishment now totalled 764 all ranks.

=== Irish Rebellion ===
The expected Irish Rebellion finally broke out in May 1798, and during its suppression the Londonderry Militia operated in Counties Dublin, Wicklow, Kildare, Carlow and Wexford. Most of the regiment was engaged at the battles of Gorey, The Curragh, New Ross, Arklow, Foulksmills, Blackmore Hill and Vinegar Hill. The Grenadier Company of the Londonderry Militia was in action at Tubberneering and was also at Arklow and Vinegar Hill. The Light Company saw action with 2nd Light Battalion at Antrim. A detachment of the regiment under Lieutenant Rowley Miller was active in capturing rebels, apprehending a leader named Talent, for whom the government had offered a reward of £200, together with a private reward of a further £1000.

The rebellion was effectively ended at Vinegar Hill, and although a small French invasion force landed in August and inflicted a defeat on the government troops at the Battle of Castlebar it was too late to have any real effect, and soon surrendered. There were still some disturbances in, such as in County Westmeath, where the Londonderry Militia joined the Bedfordshire and Worcestershire Militia and the Northumberland Fencibles in forming Maj-Gen Charles Barnett's brigade operating in the Mullingar area into January 1799. The duty consisted of escorting prisoners, searching for arms, and scouring the neighbourhood for rebels.

After the rebellion the Irish Militia settled down to garrison duty once more. With the diminishing threat of invasion after 1799, the strength of the militia could be reduced, and the surplus men were encouraged to volunteer for regiments of the line. In July 1800 Lord Castlereagh, by now the Chief Secretary for Ireland, was promoted to Colonel of the Londonderry Militia, with Sir George Hill, 2nd Baronet as his lieutenant-colonel.

By the end of 1801 peace negotiations with the French were progressing and recruiting and re-enlistment for the Irish Militia was stopped in October. The men received the new clothing they were due on 25 December, but the Treaty of Amiens was signed in March 1802 after which the militia regiments were disembodied leaving only the permanent staff of non-commissioned officers (NCOs) and drummers under the regimental adjutant.

=== Napoleonic Wars ===
However, the Peace of Amiens was short-lived and preparations to re-embody the militia begun in November 1802. Early in 1803 the regiments were ordered to begin re-enrolling former militiamen and new volunteers as well as using the ballot. The proclamation to embody the militia was issued on 15 March and carried out on 25 March.

Anti-invasion preparations were now put in hand and the reconstituted militia regiments underwent training, although most were not considered well enough trained to go into camp during the summer of 1804. The light battalions were reformed in September 1803 but were discontinued in 1806. Over the following years the regiments carried out garrison duties at various towns across Ireland, attended summer training camps.They also provided volunteers to transfer to the Regular Army. In 1805 the militia establishment was raised to allow for this. The following year Lord Castlereagh stated that no less than 42 recruiting parties crossed from England to Belfast, where the Londonderry Militia was stationed, to compete for 150 volunteers from his regiment.

The Interchange Act 1811 (51 Geo. 3. c. 128) supported by Lord Castlereagh was passed in July 1811 permitting British and Irish militia units to volunteer for service across the Irish Sea. By the end of July 34 out of 38 Irish militia regiments had volunteered for this service, including the Londonderry, which served in England in 1811–13. Another Act in November 1813, promoted by Lord Castlereagh, invited the militia to volunteer for limited foreign service, primarily for garrison duties in Europe. Every man of his own regiment except one private volunteered for this service, and the War Office was prepared to accept them, but the war ended with the abdication of Napoleon in April 1814. Militia recruiting was halted and the regiments could be progressively disembodied. The Londonderrys were paid off in 1815.

=== Long Peace ===
After the Battle of Waterloo there was a long peace. Although officers continued to be commissioned into the militia and ballots might still be held, the regiments were rarely assembled for training and the permanent staffs of militia regiments were progressively reduced. Lord Castlereagh (by then 2nd Marquess of Londonderry) remained colonel of the Londonderry Militia until his death by suicide in August 1822. Among the consequent promotions, Lt-Col Sir George Hill was promoted to colonel and Castlereagh's cousin Alexander Robert Stewart, MP for Londonderry, was commissioned as lieutenant-colonel in October that year. In 1839 Sir Robert Ferguson, 2nd Baronet became the colonel after Sir George Hill's death.

== 1852 Reforms ==
The long-standing national Militia of the United Kingdom was revived by the Militia Act 1852, enacted during a period of international tension. As before, units were raised and administered on a county basis, and filled by voluntary enlistment (although conscription by means of the Militia Ballot might be used if the counties failed to meet their quotas). Training was for 56 days on enlistment, then for 21–28 days per year, during which the men received full army pay. Under the act, Militia units could be embodied by royal proclamation for full-time home defence service in three circumstances:

1. 'Whenever a state of war exists between Her Majesty and any foreign power'.
2. 'In all cases of invasion or upon imminent danger thereof'.
3. 'In all cases of rebellion or insurrection'.

=== Londonderry Artillery Militia ===
The Militia Act 1852 introduced Artillery Militia units in addition to the traditional infantry regiments. Their role was to man coastal defences and fortifications, relieving the Royal Artillery (RA) for active service.

A Londonderry Artillery Militia was formed in January 1855, but it was always small, comprising a single company of just three officers, a surgeon, and 81 other ranks (ORs). It was not a successful unit, and after training of the Irish Militia was suspended between 1866 and 1871 because of the Fenian crisis the Londonderry Artillery Militia remained in abeyance, with no men enrolled. In May 1875 it was officially amalgamated with the Armagh and Tyrone units to form the Mid-Ulster Artillery.

=== Londonderry Light Infantry ===
Meanwhile, the infantry of the Londonderry Militia had been reformed as the Londonderry Light Infantry and embodied in January 1855 during the Crimean War,

At first it was stationed at Londonderry, before moving to Enniskillen in the late summer. There it remained until after the waar was ended by the Treaty of Paris in March 1856. It was disembodied on 20 August that year.

The militia now settled into a routine of annual training (though there was no training for the Irish Militia from 1866 to 1870 at the time of the Fenian crisis). Each militia unit had a large cadre of permanent staff and a number of the officers were former Regulars. Around a third of the recruits and many young officers went on to join the Regular Army. The Militia Reserve introduced in 1867 consisted of present and former militiamen who undertook to serve overseas in case of war.

== Cardwell and Childers Reforms ==
Under the 'Localisation of the Forces' scheme introduced by the Cardwell Reforms of 1872, militia regiments were brigaded with their local linked regular regiments. For the Donegal Militia this was in Sub-District No 64 (Counties of Londonderry, Donegal, Tyrone and Fermanagh in Belfast District of Irish Command:

- 27th (Inniskilling) Regiment of Foot
- 108th (Madras Infantry) Regiment of Foot
- Fermanagh Light Infantry
- Royal Tyrone Fusiliers
- Londonderry Light Infantry
- Prince of Wales's Own Donegal Militia
- No 64 Brigade Depot was formed at Omagh, the Tyrone Fusiliers' HQ.

Although often referred to as brigades, the sub-districts were purely administrative organisations, but in a continuation of the Cardwell Reforms a mobilisation scheme began to appear in the Army List from December 1875. This assigned places in an order of battle to Militia units serving Regular units in an 'Active Army' and a 'Garrison Army'. The Londonderry Militia was assigned to the Garrison Army manning a range of small forts and posts across Ireland.

=== 4th Battalion, Royal Inniskilling Fusiliers ===
The Childers Reforms took Cardwell's reforms further, with the militia regiments becoming numbered battalions of their linked regiments. On 1 July 1881 the 27th and 108th Regiments became the 1st and 2nd Battalions of the Royal Inniskilling Fusiliers, and the Londonderry Light Infantry became the 4th Battalion. However, in a change of policy, the Londonderry Light Infantry was instead converted to artillery the following year,

=== 9th Brigade, North Irish Division, RA ===
The Royal Artillery was being reorganised in 1882, and 11 territorial divisions of garrison artillery were formed, each with a brigade of regular artillery. The Militia Artillery was assigned to form the junior brigades of these divisions, the new Londonderry Artillery becoming 9th Brigade, North Irish Division, RA, on 1 April 1882. Unlike the earlier Londonderry Artillery company, this was a substantial unit, with an established strength of 619 all ranks organised as six batteries. When the North Irish Division was abolished in 1889 the title was altered to Londonderry Artillery (Southern Division) RA.

When the Second Boer War broke out in 1899 the militia were embodied to relieve the Regulars goung to South Africa. The Londonderry Artillery was embodied from 1 May to 3 October 1900. It did not serve overseas, but the Militia Reserve and individual volunteers did serve in South Africa. Sergeant A.W. Vyce of the Londonderry Artillery served as a volunteer with the Irish Militia Artillery Brigade, Royal Garrison Artillery, (formed from service companies from the Antrim Artillery and the Donegal Artillery), and was Mentioned in dispatches and awarded the Distinguished Conduct Medal.

The militia artillery units became part of the Royal Garrison Artillery in 1902, and the unit was redesignated Londonderry RGA (Militia).

== Disbandment ==
After the Boer War, the future of the Militia was called into question. There were moves to reform the Auxiliary Forces (Militia, Yeomanry and Volunteers) to take their place in the six Army Corps proposed by St John Brodrick as Secretary of State for War. Some batteries of Militia Artillery were to be converted to field artillery. However, little of Brodrick's scheme was carried out.

Under the sweeping Haldane Reforms of 1908, the Militia was replaced by the Special Reserve, a semi-professional force whose role was to provide reinforcement drafts for Regular units serving overseas in wartime. The majority of the officers and men of the Londonderry RGA (M) accepted transfer to the Special Reserve Royal Field Artillery, becoming the Londonderry Royal Field Reserve Artillery. However, in a change of policy all the RFRA units were scrapped in 1909, the Londonderrys being disbanded on 20 October. Instead the men of the RFA Special Reserve would form Brigade Ammunition Columns for the Regular RFA brigades on the outbreak of war.

== Commanders ==
=== Colonels ===
Colonels of the regiment included:

- Robert Stewart, Viscount Castlereagh, promoted 12 July 1800, died 1822
- Sir George Hill, 2nd Baronet, promoted 1822, died 1839
- Sir Robert Ferguson, 2nd Baronet, appointed 24 June 1839; honorary colonel from 1855

After the 1852 Reforms, no new colonels were appointed to the militia; the lieutenant-colonel became the commandant and the position of Honorary Colonel was created.

=== Lieutenant-Colonels ===
Lieutenant-Colonels included:

- Viscount Castlereagh, appointed 1793, promoted to colonel 1800
- Sir George Hill, 2nd Baronet, appointed 13 July 1800, promoted to colonel 1822
- Alexander Robert Stewart, 11 October 1822
- Sir William Fitzwilliam Lenox-Conyngham, formerly 88th Regiment of Foot (Connaught Rangers), appointed major 14 April 1848, promoted 25 September 1850; continued with 9th Brigade, NI Division, RA
- D.W. Stevenson, promoted 3 November 1897
- Stewart Bruce, promoted 2 August 1899

=== Honorary colonels ===
The following served as Honorary Colonel:

- Sir Robert Ferguson, 2nd Baronet, from colonel 1855, died 1860
- Robert Peel Dawson, formerly 11th Hussars, appointed 12 April 1871
- Sir Henry Bruce, 3rd Baronet, Lord Lieutenant of County Londonderry, appointed 10 January 1878

== Heritage & ceremonial ==
=== Uniforms & insignia ===
The uniform of the Londonderry Militia was a red coat with blue facings. The Londonderry Light Infantry wore yellow facings, and the cap badge consisted of a simple bugle-horn suspended from a cord with a shamrock knot, surrounded by a garter inscribed 'LONDONDERRY REGIMENT', topped by a three-towered castle.

On conversion to artillery the corps adopted the blue uniform and red facings of the Royal Artillery. The officers wore the standard North Irish Division helmet plate and embroidered pouch, each with 'LONDONDERRY ARTILLERY' on the lower scroll. In 1907 the other ranks bore the brass titles 'RGA' over 'DONEGAL' on the shoulder straps of the khaki service dress.

=== Precedence ===
On the outbreak of the French Revolutionary War the English counties had drawn lots to determine the relative precedence of their militia regiments. In 1798 the new Irish militia regiments received their own table of precedence, in which County Londonderry came 16th. In 1833 King William IV drew the lots to determine an order of precedence for the whole of the United Kingdom. Those regiments raised before 1783 took the first 69 places, followed by the 60 regiments (including those in Ireland) raised for the French Revolutionary War: the Londonderry Militia took 95th place, and this remained unchanged when the list was updated in 1855.

The Londonderry Artillery Militia of 1855 was assigned the precedence of 21 among militia artillery units; this was carried over to the Mid-Ulster Artillery. When the Londonderry LI was converted to artillery in 1882 it received the precedence of 36, as one of the last such units formed. Most regiments took little notice of the numeral.

== See also ==
- Irish Militia
- Militia (United Kingdom)
- Royal Inniskilling Fusiliers
- North Irish Division, Royal Artillery
- Militia Artillery units of the United Kingdom and Colonies
