= Monument to the 7th Earl of Carlisle =

Grade I listed building in Ryedale, United Kingdom

Coordinates: 54°05′41″N 0°54′31″W

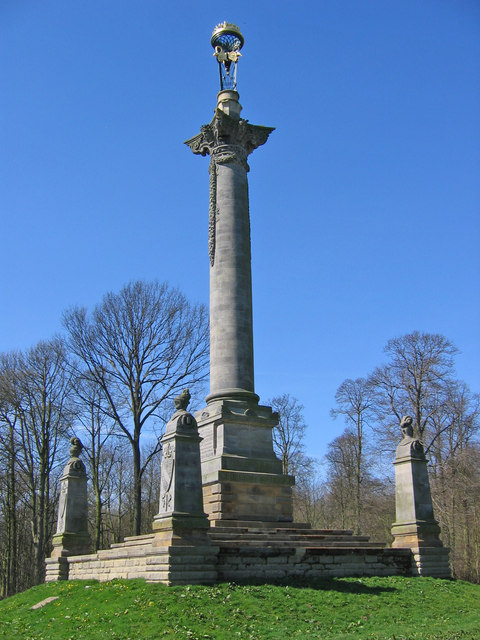
The monument, in 2007

The Monument to the 7th Earl of Carlisle, also known as the Carlisle Memorial Column, is a historic structure associated with Castle Howard, a stately home in North Yorkshire, in England.

George Howard, 7th Earl of Carlisle, was the owner of Castle Howard, and a prominent politician. He died in 1862, and a monument was commissioned for a location atop Bulmer Hill on the approach to the estate. It is in the form of a 110 feet (34 m) column. It was designed by Frederick Pepys Cockerell, with work commencing in August 1867, and being completed in 1869. The project cost £2,600.

The monument was twice struck by lightning. It was hit by a bomber during World War II, which caused the brazier at its top to fall. A new brazier was created to the original design and set atop the monument in 2002. The monument was Grade I listed in 1954.

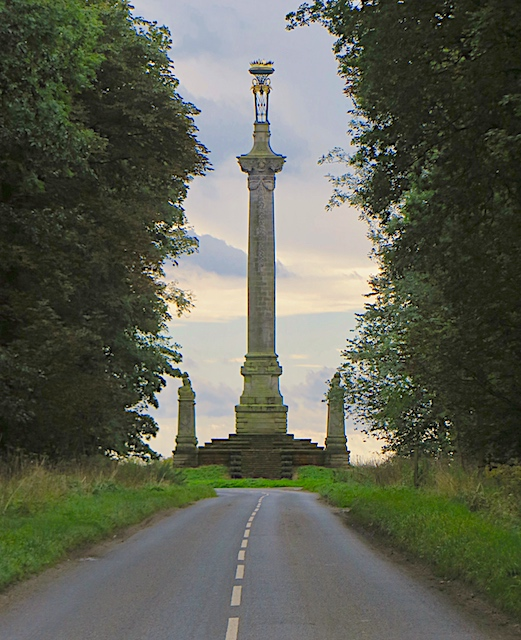
View of the monument, along the approach road to Castle Howard

The monument is built of granite and sandstone, sourced from near Whitby. It consists of a tall column with garlands hanging down on the north and south sides, a capital carved with scrolls, heads and acanthus leaves. It is surmounted by a gilt-bronze tripod, which supports a gilded brazier, embellished with a design of flames and swans' heads, designed to reflect the sun. The column stands on a base approached by steps, with rusticated quoins, an inscription and a plaque, on a platform with knights' helmets on bases at the corners. The column is 7 feet 4 inches in diameter and is hollow, but no internal staircase was provided, Cockerell contending that its elevated position already provided excellent views.

== See also ==
- Grade I listed buildings in North Yorkshire (district)
- Listed buildings in Bulmer, North Yorkshire
