= Ralph Bulmer (soldier) =

English knight and soldier

Sir Ralph Bulmer (died 1558) of Wilton in Yorkshire (present day Redcar and Cleveland), was an English knight and soldier active on the Scottish border and during the war of the Rough Wooing.

Around 1535, Ralph married either Anne Aske, a co-heiress of Roger de Aske, or Anne Tempest a daughter of Sir John Tempest. Henry VIII granted them possessions of Marrick Priory.

== Pilgrimage of Grace to Solway Moss ==
Ralph's uncle, Sir John Bulmer, and his family were attainted of treason for their part in the Pilgrimage of Grace in June 1537. According to the inventory made by the crown officers, John's manor house at Bulmer was made of slate and greatly decayed. Ralph was a prisoner in the Tower of London in March 1538. He carved his name "RAVLEF BVLMAR 1537" in the Beauchamp Tower. Ralph was released and later restored to some of the family lands.

In November, 1542, Ralph was a captain of a company of 100 men in the campaign against Scotland that culminated in the battle of Solway Moss. He was accompanied by Sir William Bulmer, who commanded 50 men. On his arrival, Lord Hertford was not pleased with the instructions Bulmer had brought him from the Duke of Norfolk to destroy the town of Jedburgh as he was ill-equipped for the task.

Ralph was credited with his colleague Ralph Eure and the garrisons of Berwick upon Tweed and Teviotdale with burning during November 1542; Coldingham; Reston; Ayton with 5 other places; Crochanshaws; Primeside with 6 other places; Coldstream town and Abbey; Scaythmure and other farmsteads belonging to it (which included Swinton and Swithmore).

== Captain of Roxburgh ==
After the battle of Pinkie in September 1547, Ralph was made commander of an English fort in the occupied zone at Roxburgh. He wrote to the Duke of Somerset on 30 December 1547, complaining of slow progress re-fortifying the site. The site of a new fort had set by the surveyor, Sir Richard Lee. Ralph had already written complaining of the lack of application of William Ridgeway the military engineer who seldom came to Roxburgh.

Ralph was intending to collect the profits from the lands of Kelso Abbey and Melrose Abbey, and planned to set Ker of Cessford, an ally, against Walter Scott of Buccleuch to strengthen his hold on the area. Ralph also obtained intelligence from spies in Leith for Somerset. In November 1547 he reported on the movement of artillery to assault the English garrison at Broughty Castle near Dundee.

In 1557 Ralph was in readiness with the English border wardens for a Scottish invasion. He died the following year, in 1558.
