= Wilton, Redcar and Cleveland =

Village in North Yorkshire, England

Coordinates: 54.56981°N 1.09673°W

Wilton
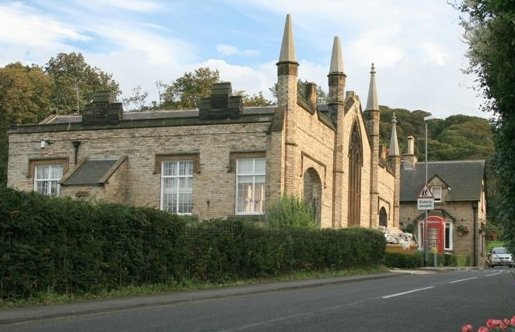
- The old village school at Wilton, now private housing

- Location within North Yorkshire
- OS grid reference: NZ584197
- Unitary authority: Redcar and Cleveland
- Ceremonial county: North Yorkshire
- Region: North East
- Country: England
- Sovereign state: United Kingdom
- Post town: REDCAR
- Postcode district: TS10
- Dialling code: 01642
- Police: Cleveland
- Fire: Cleveland
- Ambulance: North East
- UK Parliament: Redcar

Wilton is a small village in Redcar and Cleveland, North Yorkshire, England.

== Geography ==
It is located between Redcar and Eston at the base of Eston Hills – to the east of Eston Nab. The village is noted for its golf course and castle, Wilton Castle. It lies just south of the A174 trunk road. On the other side of the A174, is the village of Lazenby.

== Demographics ==
In 1951 the parish had a population of 958.

== History ==
The Anglican parish church is dedicated to St Cuthbert. Wilton Castle was sold to ICI in the 1940s. On 1 April 1974 the civil parish was abolished and merged with Guisborough.

=== St Cuthbert's Church ===
St. Cuthbert's Church, now an Anglican church, was founded before 1100. As with the nearby church in Kirkleatham, also named after St Cuthbert, it is s believed that the body of St Cuthbert was carried through Wilton by the monks of Lindisfarne, on their way from Ripon to Durham. The church is included in the map of this journey at Durham Cathedral.

In Norman times, the parish of Wilton-in-Cleveland came under the domain of Gisborough Priory. Following the dissolution of the monasteries, the church fell into disrepair.

It was only in 1850 that restoration of the church took place. This was with the financial help of the landlord of Wilton, Sir J.H. Lowther. Original stones, as far as possible, were used in the restoration. In 1907 another restoration began, Again, the original stones were used, this time they were numbered so that they could be placed in the same position again.

Marks on the walls inside the church are believed to have been made by Cromwell's soldiers from sharpening their arrowheads and other weapons.

=== Wilton Castle ===
Wilton Castle is an early 19th-century mansion house, built on the site of a medieval castle, now converted into residential apartments. It is a Grade II listed building.

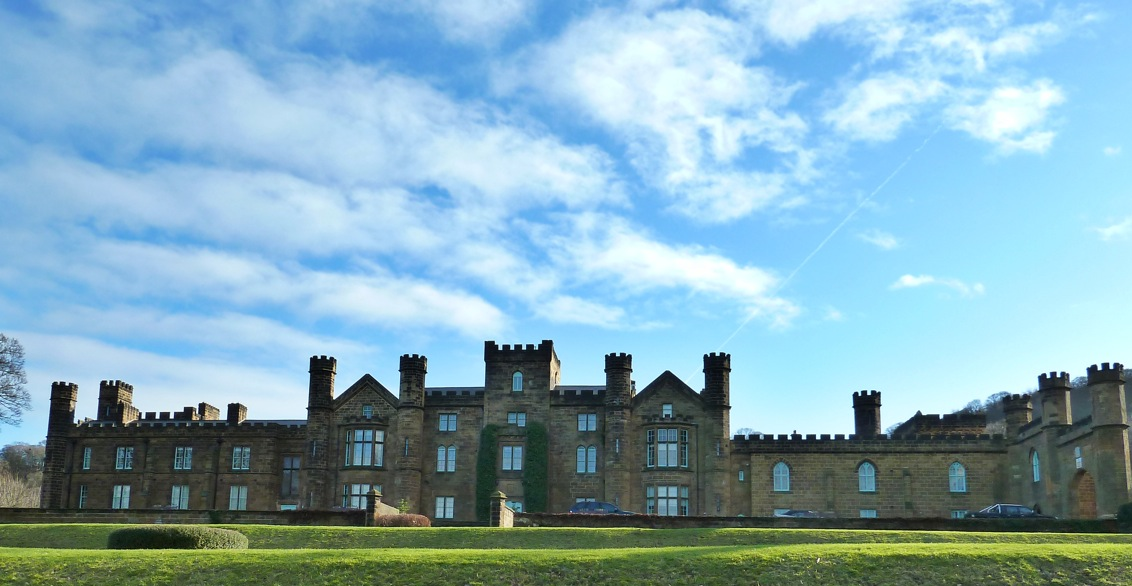
Wilton Castle

The Bulmer family owned the manor of Wilton in the 13th century and were granted a licence to fortify their manor house in 1210. In 1331 Ralph Bulmer was granted permission to build a castle on his manor. The estate was confiscated by the Crown following the attainder and execution of Sir John and Lady Bulmer for high treason arising out of their part in the Pilgrimage of Grace in 1536. The manor was restored to their son but was lost again, by sequestration in 1644, following Sir William Bulmers opposition to Parliament during the English Civil War. It was again later restored but the castle had been slighted by Parliamentary forces and made uninhabitable.

The estate was purchased in about 1806 by John Lowther of Swillington, brother of the Earl of Lonsdale. Lowther demolished the remains of the medieval castle and built, in about 1810, an imposing mansion house on the site, to a design by architect Sir Robert Smirke. The Gothick design includes a fifteen bay frontage with a four-storey castellated tower at the centre, flanked by castellated and gabled bays and turrets and five bayed two-storey wings.

Lowther was created a Baronet in 1824 (see Lowther Baronets). On the death of the third Baronet in 1894 the Baronetcy passed to his grandson but the Wilton Castle estate passed to his younger son James Lowther.

The family sold the property in 1945 to Imperial Chemical Industries for use as offices occupied at various times by major industrialists such as Richard Beeching and Sir John Harvey Jones. The park was developed as a golf course for ICI staff. ICI sold it in 1999, after which the golf club was acquired by its members and the castle converted into residential apartments.

=== Wilton International ===
Wilton International is a multi-occupancy chemical manufacturing site located on the north side of the A174 road, beginning less than one mile from the village of Wilton. The site was formerly wholly owned and operated by ICI and was opened by the Queen in 1956. Following the fragmentation of ICI, since 1995, Enron owned the facility briefly before it was acquired by Sembcorp, a Singaporean utility company. A number of multinational chemical companies now operate on the site and Sembcorp have built the UK's first wood fired power station, Wilton 10, on the site. In 2013, they announced a new waste to energy plant, to be known as Wilton 11.
