= Bulmer family =

Anglo Saxon noble family

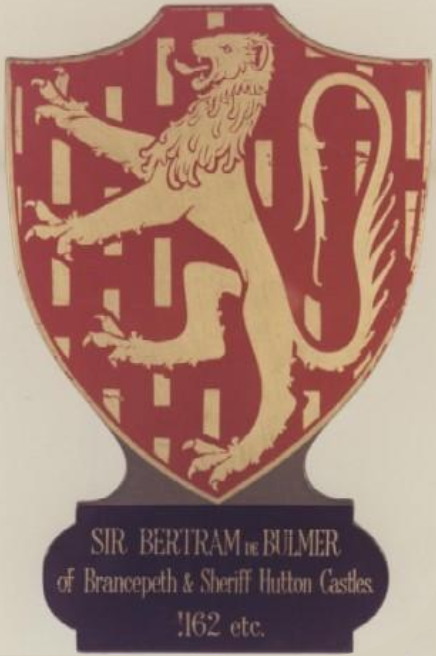
Arms of Bulmer: Gules billettée or, a lion rampant of the second

The Bulmer family were an Anglo Saxon noble family that survived and prospered in Norman England after the conquest; they were resident in Yorkshire. The family takes their name from Bulmer, North Yorkshire. The exact origin of the Bulmer name itself is uncertain but it has been suggested that it could come from the old English "Bull mere", a lake frequented by a bull. Another possible origin is found in the “Historical Notes of the Baronial House of Bulmer". This records that the name Bulmer is derived from the Norse 'Bolvar' (or Bule-maere in Anglo-Saxon) meaning Illustrious Bull, one of Odin's titles. Ansketil de Bulmer was the first documented member of the Bulmer family who lived in the area in the twelfth century with the current spelling.

== Bulmer of Bulmer and Brancepeth ==
Ansketil served as Sheriff of Yorkshire. The surname Bulmer is the subject of much discussion as it is believed that they were an aristocratic family of Anglo-Saxon origin who retained their status after the Norman Conquest of 1066. It is believed that the Bulmers were related to the Anglo-Saxon noble Liulf, (Ligulf, Luigulf, etc.), who was the first member of the Lumley family. Liulf was murdered at Gateshead in 1081 by the retainers of Walcher, the first Norman Bishop of Durham. The Domesday Book of 1086 lists the lord of the manor of Bulmer in Yorkshire as Nigel Fossard who held it from Robert, Count of Mortain, half-brother of William the Conqueror. In 1066 the Anglo-Saxon lord of Bulmer was Luigulf. At some time the lord adopted the surname of "de Bulmer" from his principal manor and seat.

The de Bulmers are thought to have continued as tenants of the Normans who inherited Liulf's land in Yorkshire. At sometime in the twelfth century Ansketil Bulmer is said to have married the daughter of the lord of the manor of Brancepeth near Durham and their son Bertram Bulmer, who succeeded him as Sheriff, inherited this property. Later the Bulmer heiress married into the powerful Norman family of de Neville, who thus inherited Brancepeth Castle and other estates including Raby Castle, the oldest part of which, the Saxon "Bulmer Tower", is inscribed with the initials BB supposed to signify Bertram Bulmer. To memorialise the important marriage, the de Neville family adopted a bull as their canting crest and for their seal. A sculpted escutcheon in the inner gateway of Raby Castle (?) displays a lion rampant, supposed by Surtees (1920) to be the Bulmer arms of Gules billettée or, a lion rampant of the second.

== Bulmer of Wilton ==
A later branch of the Bulmer family had its seat at Wilton Castle, Wilton, in present-day Redcar and Cleveland.

Sir Ralph Bulmer was Lord of the manor of Wilton, in 1310, and was granted a royal licence to crenellate his manor house there in 1330.

Sir William Bulmer (1465–1531) of Wilton was High Sheriff of Durham 1503–1516 and High Sheriff of Yorkshire in 1517. His son Sir John Bulmer (1481–1537) and his wife Margaret Stafford, were heavily involved in the Pilgrimage of Grace of October 1536 led by Robert Aske and in Bigod's Rebellion, the uprising of January 1537 led by her nephew Sir Francis Bigod of Settrington. Both John Bulmer and Lady Bulmer were convicted of High Treason and were executed on 25 May 1537, he by hanging at Tyburn, London and she by burning at the stake at Smithfield, London, by order of King Henry VIII. All their estates were forfeited but the Wilton Castle and a small portion of the original estate was later restored to their nephew, Sir Ralph Bulmer by King Edward VI in 1547. In 1558 by sequestration, Queen Mary I granted the estate to a politician by the name of Thomas Cornwallis.

William Bulmer (1492–1546) brother of John, married Elizabeth Elmeden, heiress of Embleton near Sedgfield, Co Durham and thereby acquired estates at Embleton, Tursdale, Claxton and Fishburn. Much land was sold by Sir Bertram Bulmer (1579–1638) and that remaining was sequestered in 1644 when his son, William Bulmer was declared a delinquent for opposition to Parliament during the Civil War. The estate was eventually restored to his brother Anthony and sold by him.

Wilton Castle was slighted following the Civil War and was thereafter uninhabitable. It was demolished and rebuilt by a new owner in the early 19th century.

== Bulmer in Burning Times ==
Joseph Bulmer had been purportedly hanged in 1649 due to accusation of witchcraft during Witch trials in Early Modern Europe in Newcastle, England.
