= Wilton Castle, North Yorkshire =

Wilton Castle
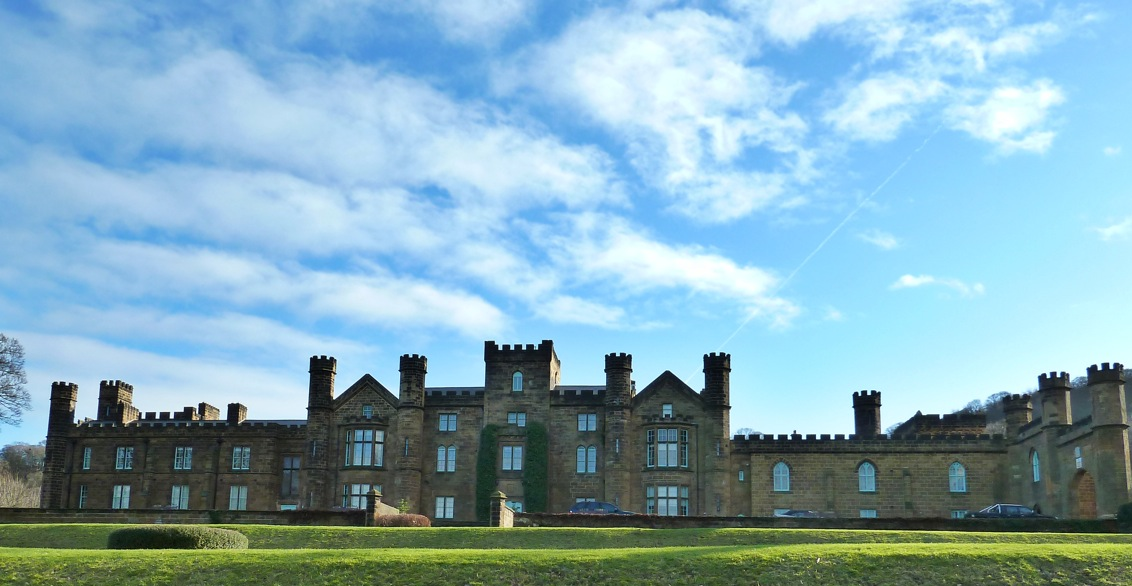
- Interactive map of the Wilton Castle area

General information
- Type: Former mansion, now residential apartments
- Location: Wilton, North Yorkshire, England
- Coordinates: 54°34′8″N 1°6′5″W
- Completed: early 19th-century
- Landlord: Wilton Castle Management Company Ltd

Design and construction
- Designations: Grade II listed

Wilton Castle is an early 19th-century mansion, built on the site of a medieval castle, now converted into residential apartments, situated at Wilton, in Redcar and Cleveland, North Yorkshire, England. It is a Grade II listed building.

== History ==
At the time of Domesday Book, the estate is recorded as held by Nigel on behalf of Robert Earl of Morton. John de Bulmer and the Bulmer family became lords of the manor of Wilton but it isn't until towards the end of the 11th century when the Bulmer family are recorded as building a wooden manor house on the land. In 1170, Sir Ralph de Bulmer received a royal charter confirming his ownership of the estate.

King John granted William de Bulmer a licence to fortify their manor house in the year 1210. This would mean building in stone and marks the beginnings of the original castle as a fortified residence. In 1330, a Sir Ralph de Bulmer obtained a charter of his desmesne from King Edward III acknowledging his ownership of the estate. Sir Ralph carried out further alterations to the building and obtained a licence to crenellate from King Edward III allowing him to make the manor house into a castle.

All estates including Wilton estate were forfeit to the crown following the attainder and execution of Sir John and Lady Bulmer on 25 May 1537, for high treason under the 1534 Act of Supremacy, arising out of their part in the Pilgrimage of Grace, in protest against King Henry VIII's break with the Roman Catholic Church. The manor was later restored to their nephew, Sir Ralph de Bulmer (d. 1558) by King Edward VI in 1547.

In 1558, Queen Mary I granted the estate to Sir Thomas Cornwallis and the estate passed via his son and grandson to his great-grandson Lord Charles Cornwallis in 1698. Lord Cornwallis sold the estate in the early 1700s to Sir Stephen Fox. Sir Stephen's son by his second marriage was created Earl of Ilchester in 1747 and sold the estate the next year.

The estate was purchased by the trustees of the will of a Robert Lowther for the benefit of (Sir) James Lowther (1736–1802), member of Parliament (1757–1784). Sir James Lowther became the first Earl of Lonsdale in 1784 and with his death in 1802 the Earldom of Lonsdale became extinct.

=== Demolition and rebuilding ===
The castle had been allowed to decay and by 1805 was largely a ruin. The estate was purchased in about 1806 by a cousin Sir John Lowther (1759–1844). Sir John Lowther demolished the remains of the medieval castle in about 1807, and in 1810 built an imposing mansion house on the site, to a design by architect Sir Robert Smirke. The first stage of the rebuilding of the castle was the building of the centre block, the west wing and a short low east wing and later in a second phase of building, an octagonal tower was added to the end of the east wing. The Gothic design includes a fifteen-bay frontage with a four-storey castellated tower at the centre, flanked by castellated and gabled bays and turrets and five-bayed two-storey wings. Lowther was created a Baronet in 1824 (see Lowther Baronets).

The iron industry was founded in Middlesbrough by Bolckow and Vaughan followed by the chance discovery in 1850 of iron ore in the Eston hills on land that the Lowthers owned. One area of farmland was rented to Bolckow and Vaughan for £17,700 pa and this change of fortunes funded later redevelopment work.

Sir Charles Hugh Lowther, 3rd Baronet (1803–1894) inherited the family baronetcy from his brother in 1868. The whole of the east wing including the octagonal tower was later demolished and replaced by 1887 with amongst other rooms a pavilion ballroom to create essentially the building that exists today. Farmhouses and outbuildings on the estate were also demolished and rebuilt for tenants followed by the building of a new village of Wilton out of sight of the castle, and the main road was moved further away from the front of the castle. On the death of the third Baronet in 1894, the Baronetcy passed to his grandson but the Wilton Castle estate passed to his younger son James Lowther (1840–1904).

James Lowther died at Wilton in 1904 and left the castle to his nephew Colonel John George Lowther.

=== Post War ===
Colonel Lowther sold the estate including Wilton Castle, his private residence in 1945 to Imperial Chemical Industries. In 1946, staff moved into Wilton Castle to plan the development of the estate as a chemical works. The estate was laid out as ICI Wilton and the whole of the castle was converted and used as offices due to restrictions at the time on building new offices. The offices were occupied at various times by major industrialists such as Dr Richard Beeching and Sir John Harvey Jones. Staff were transferred to new offices on the works site as restrictions were lifted, such that by 1969 the building had many empty offices, but still had dining facilities and bedrooms for visitors, and a staff club. In 1970, ICI carried out internal modifications and invited Trust House to manage the facilities.

The park had been developed as a golf course for ICI staff and was sold in 1999. The golf club was acquired by its members, and over the period 2001–2002 Wilton Castle was converted by George Wimpey Ltd into 45 apartments and houses.

=== Current status ===
There is no remaining evidence of the building of 1210, but internal walls to the east of the entrance are particularly thick and it is thought they constituted part of the original tower. Wilton Castle was given grade II listed building status in 1952. As well as the castle the associated stable block, garden wall, and retaining wall are grade II listed buildings.

== Cultural references ==
The castle was used as a location in the BBC television drama series Spender (1991).
