= Donegal Artillery =

Auxiliary unit of the British Army

Donegal Artillery Militia (Prince of Wales's) 3rd Brigade, North Irish Division, RA Donegal Artillery (Southern Division) RA Donegal (Prince of Wales's) RGA (M)
- Active: December 1854–20 October 1909
- Country: United Kingdom
- Branch: Militia
- Type: Artillery
- Role: Garrison Artillery
- Part of: North Irish Division, RA (1882–89); Southern Division, RA (1889–1902)
- Garrison/HQ: Letterkenny
- Engagements: Second Boer War

The Donegal Artillery Militia (The Prince of Wales's) was a part-time reserve unit of Britain's Royal Artillery based in County Donegal, Ireland, from 1854 to 1909. Volunteers from the unit served in the Second Boer War and distinguished themselves at the siege of Schweizer-Reneke.

== Background ==
The Parliament of Ireland passed a Militia Act at the start of the French Revolutionary War in 1793, which led to the creation of the first effective Irish Militia. One of the regiments formed was the Prince of Wales's Own Donegal Militia, based at Lifford, which saw action during the Irish Rebellion of 1798.

The disembodied Militia of the United Kingdom declined during the long peace after the battle of Waterloo. It was revived by the Militia Act 1852, enacted during a period of international tension. As before, units were raised and administered on a county basis, and filled by voluntary enlistment (although conscription by means of the Militia Ballot might be used if the counties failed to meet their quotas). Training was for 56 days on enlistment, then for 21–28 days per year, during which the men received full army pay. Under the Act, Militia units could be embodied by Royal Proclamation for full-time home defence service in three circumstances:

1. 'Whenever a state of war exists between Her Majesty and any foreign power'.
2. 'In all cases of invasion or upon imminent danger thereof'.
3. 'In all cases of rebellion or insurrection'.

The Prince of Wales's Own Donegal Militia was reformed as an infantry regiment of 12 companies.

== Donegal Artillery Militia ==
The 1852 Act introduced Artillery Militia units in addition to the traditional infantry regiments. Their role was to man coastal defences and fortifications, relieving the Royal Artillery (RA) for active service. In November 1854 the Donegal Artillery Militia was formed at Letterkenny from four infantry companies detached from the Donegal Militia, giving it a total establishment of 417 officers and other ranks (ORs). In March 1855 Captain Robert Roe Fisher, a retired RA officer, was appointed Lieutenant-Colonel commandant of the new unit, and in November it assumed the subtitle 'Prince of Wales's Own' from its parent unit.

The Donegal Artillery Militia was embodied for duty in September 1855 during the Crimean War when the bulk of the Regular Army was away. It was sent to Omagh in County Tyrone, then by 10 December it moved to Charlemont Fort, where it remained. The war ended with the Treaty of Paris signed on 30 March 1856, and the Donegal Artillery was disembodied in September 1856.

Several militia units had volunteered for overseas garrison duty during the Crimean War, and when the Indian Mutiny broke out and Regular troops were sent to suppress it, the Donegal Artillery was one of a number of militia units that volunteered for similar service. However, the offer was not accepted, and the unit was not embodied.

The militia now settled into a routine of annual training (though there was no training for the Irish Militia from 1866 to 1870 at the time of the Fenian crisis). Each militia unit had a large cadre of permanent staff (26 in the case of the Donegal Artillery) and a number of the officers were former Regulars. Around a third of the recruits and many young officers went on to join the Regular Army. The Militia Reserve introduced in 1867 consisted of present and former militiamen who undertook to serve overseas in case of war.

Following the Cardwell Reforms a mobilisation scheme began to appear in the Army List from December 1875. This assigned places in an order of battle of the 'Garrison Army' to Militia Artillery units: the Donegal Artillery's war station was at Cork, including Spike Island, Fort Camden and Fort Carlisle guarding Cork Harbour.

The Royal Artillery was reorganised in 1882, and 11 territorial divisions of garrison artillery were formed, each with a brigade of regular artillery. The Militia Artillery was assigned to form the junior brigades of these divisions, the Donegal Artillery becoming 3rd Brigade, North Irish Division, RA, on 1 April 1882, by now with six batteries. When the North Irish Division was abolished in 1889 the title was altered to Donegal Artillery (Southern Division) RA.

=== Second Boer War ===
When the Second Boer War broke out in 1899 the Militia Reserve was mobilised to reinforce the regulars sent to South Africa. Later, the Donegal Artillery was one of six Militia Artillery units permitted to form a Service Company of volunteers to serve in South Africa alongside the regulars. The service company of five officers and 144 ORs under Major William Reed embarked for South Africa in March 1900. There they combined with the service company of the Antrim Artillery to form the Irish Militia Artillery brigade under the command of Lt-Col Eldred Pottinger of the Antrim.

From April to September the brigade's duties consisted of escorting 1000 Boer prisoners of war by sea to St Helena, and on return to South Africa they assisted in manning the defences of Cape Town and Simonstown. At the end of September the Adjutant of the Donegals, Capt Frederick Crawford, led a detachment of 25 Donegals and 25 Antrims to Orange River Station. There they took over the manning of three 7-pounder mountain guns and two Maxim guns, with Capt Crawford appointed Officer Commanding (OC) Troops at the Orange River Bridge. They were relieved by a similar detachment of Antrims and Donegals that left Cape Town on 18 October under Maj G.E. Elmitt of the Antrims. While there, they took part in demolishing 32 miles (51 km) of railway lines to the north and laying land mines in the kopjes adjoining Zoutpans Drift.

In November the remainder of the Donegal company under Maj Reed (promoted to Lt-Col on 12 October) moved from Cape Town to Kimberley, where they were broken up into small detachments manning field guns at various posts, including manning a gun on one of the armoured trains running out of Kimberley. On 20 November Lieutenant W.H. Milligan and 28 ORs of the Donegals joined a relief column for Schweizer-Reneke, which involved a three-day march, fighting all the way. They were then trapped in the town and besieged until relieved by Lord Methuen's column and brought back to Kimberley on 28 January 1901. Lieutenant-Col Reed became OC Troops at various places, including 'A' Section of the Kimberley defences in February 1901, and was Commander, Royal Artillery, to Major-General Pretyman, Military Governor of Orange Free State, on 2 April.

The company left Kimberley on 7 June for Cape Town, where the Irish Militia Brigade embarked for home. The Donegal Artillery lost four officers and ORs who died of disease during the campaign. Captain Crawford, Acting Brigade Sergeant-Major C.W. Holt and Sgt J. Clarke were Mentioned in dispatches, and BSM Holt was awarded the Distinguished Conduct Medal. All the participants received the Queen's South Africa Medal with clasps for 'Cape Colony', 'Orange Free State' and 'South Africa 1901'.

The remainder of the Donegal Artillery had been embodied on 2 May 1900 and served in home defence until disembodiment on 6 November 1900.

From 1902 most units of the Militia artillery formally became part of the Royal Garrison Artillery (RGA), the Donegal unit taking the title of 'Donegal RGA (M).

== Disbandment ==
After the Boer War, the future of the Militia was called into question. There were moves to reform the Auxiliary Forces (Militia, Yeomanry and Volunteers) to take their place in the six Army Corps proposed by St John Brodrick as Secretary of State for War. Some batteries of Militia Artillery were to be converted to field artillery. However, little of Brodrick's scheme was carried out.

Under the sweeping Haldane Reforms of 1908, the Militia was replaced by the Special Reserve, a semi-professional force whose role was to provide reinforcement drafts for Regular units serving overseas in wartime. The majority of the officers and men of the Donegal RGA (M) accepted transfer to the Special Reserve Royal Field Artillery, becoming the Donegal Royal Field Reserve Artillery. However, in a change of policy all the RFRA units were scrapped in 1909, the Donegals being disbanded on 20 October. Instead the men of the RFA Special Reserve would form Brigade Ammunition Columns for the Regular RFA brigades on the outbreak of war. The last Commanding Officer of the Donegal RFRA, Lt-Col W.A.G. Saunders-Knox-Gore, served through World War I and was awarded an OBE (Military) in the 1919 Birthday Honours.

== Commanders ==
=== Lieutenant-Colonels Commandant ===
- Robert Roe Fisher, former captain, RA, appointed March 1855, resigned 1878
- Robert George Montgomery, transferred as a captain from the Donegal infantry Militia, promoted Maj 13 September 1860, promoted Lt-Col 16 March 1878, retired 5 February 1879
- James Corry Jones Lowry, promoted 5 March 1879
- H.H.A. Stewart, formerly RA, appointed 23 March 1889
- Thomas E. Batt, promoted 25 December 1895
- W.A.G. Saunders-Knox-Gore, former major, RA, appointed 1 April 1901

=== Honorary Colonels ===
The following served as Honorary Colonel of the unit:

- Sir James Annesley Stewart, 8th Baronet, formerly of the 6th (Inniskilling) Dragoons, appointed 1855, died 1879
- Robert George Montgomery, former CO, appointed 3 September 1879
- James Wilfred Hewitt, 5th Viscount Lifford, appointed 20 May 1896, continued with RFRA

=== Other notable officers ===
- Lord Francis Conyngham, MP, former Lieutenant, Royal Navy, commissioned as captain 11 September 1867
- Sir Harry Jocelyn Urquhart Stewart, 11th Baronet, commissioned as captain 3 April 1895, promoted to major 18 May 1905

== Heritage & ceremonial ==
=== Uniforms & insignia ===
On formation the corps adopted the blue uniform and red facings of the Royal Artillery. The officers wore the standard North Irish Division helmet plate with 'DONEGAL ARTILLERY' on the lower scroll. Similarly they wore the RA general pattern full dress Sabretache, but the RA motto 'QUO FAS ET GLORIA DUCUNT' on the lower scroll was replaced by 'DONEGAL ARTILLERY'. The embroidered badge on the officers' Field service cap had the Prince of Wales's insignia (the Prince of Wales's feathers in silver wire emerging from a gold crown, with the motto 'ICH DIEN' in silver on a light blue backing); above was a scroll reading 'THE DONEGAL ARTILLERY' and below a scroll reading 'PRINCE OF WALES'S', both embroidered in gold on red backing. The whole badge had a black cloth backing. In 1907 the other ranks bore the brass titles 'RGA' over 'DONEGAL' on the shoulder straps of the khaki service dress.

=== Memorial ===
The year after the end of the Boer War, the officers of the Donegal Artillery presented a brass lectern to Letterkenny church as a memorial to members of the regiment who died in the war.

== Notes ==
- Beckett, Ian F W (2011). Britain's Part Time Soldiers. The Amateur Military Tradition 1558—1945 (2 ed.). Barnsley: Pen & Sword. ISBN 9781848843950.
- Burke's Peerage, Baronetage and Knightage, 100th Edn, London, 1953.
- Col John K. Dunlop, The Development of the British Army 1899–1914, London: Methuen, 1938.
- Brig-Gen Sir James E. Edmonds, History of the Great War: Military Operations, France and Belgium, 1914, Vol I, 3rd Edn, London: Macmillan,1933/Woking: Shearer, 1986, ISBN 0-946998-01-9/Uckfield: Naval & Military Press, 2021, ISBN 978-1-78331-611-3
- J.B.M. Frederick, Lineage Book of British Land Forces 1660–1978, Vol I, Wakefield: Microform Academic, 1984, ISBN 1-85117-007-3.
- J.B.M. Frederick, Lineage Book of British Land Forces 1660–1978, Vol II, Wakefield: Microform Academic, 1984, ISBN 1-85117-009-X.
- Lt-Col H.G. Hart, The New Annual Army List, and Militia List (various dates from 1840).
- Col George Jackson Hay, An Epitomized History of the Militia (The Constitutional Force), London: United Service Gazette, 1905/Ray Westlake Military Books, 1987, ISBN 0-9508530-7-0/Uckfield: Naval & Military Press, 2015, ISBN 978-1-78331171-2.
- Norman E.H. Litchfield, The Militia Artillery 1852–1909 (Their Lineage, Uniforms and Badges), Nottingham: Sherwood Press, 1987, ISBN 0-9508205-1-2.
- Col K. W. Maurice-Jones, The History of Coast Artillery in the British Army, London: Royal Artillery Institution, 1959/Uckfield: Naval & Military Press, 2005, ISBN 978-1-845740-31-3.
- Sir Henry McAnally, The Irish Militia 1793–1816: A Social and Military Study, Dublin: Clonmore & Reynolds/London: Eyre & Spottiswoode, 1949.
- Edward M. Spiers, The Army and Society 1815–1914, London: Longmans, 1980, ISBN 0-582-48565-7.

== External sources ==
- Gazette Online
