= Gerald Lenox-Conyngham =

Irish surveyor & geodesist (1866–1956)

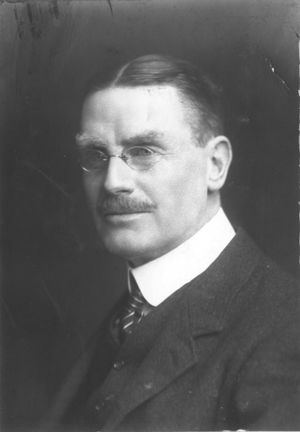
Gerald Lenox-Conyngham c.1920

Sir Gerald Ponsonby Lenox-Conyngham Kt FRS FRAS (21 August 1866 – 27 October 1956) was an Irish surveyor and geodesist. He was the last superintendent of the Great Trigonometrical Survey from 1912 to 1921, and was reader in geodesy at the University of Cambridge from 1922 to 1947.

== Early life and family ==
He was born at Springhill, Moneymore, County Londonderry, to Laura Calvert Arbuthnot, fourth daughter of Isabella Boyle and George Arbuthnot, and Sir William Fitzwilliam Lenox-Conyngham. He was the seventh of eleven children. When he was aged ten, his family moved to Edinburgh, where he attended Edinburgh Academy. He went to the Royal Military Academy at Woolwich when he was seventeen years old and passed out first with the sword of honour and the Pollock Medal. Attached to the Royal Engineers as a lieutenant on 16 September 1885, he spent two years at the School of Military Engineering at Chatham before being posted to India.

== Career ==
In 1889 he joined the trigonometrical branch of the Survey of India. He became assistant to Sidney Burrard who, that same year, commenced an investigation into discrepancies evident in measurements of the longitude perpendicular to lines of latitude; the investigation provided new data which were successful. Thus began a lifelong friendship.

In 1890, Lenox-Conyngham married Elsie Margaret Bradshaw, daughter of British Surgeon-General Sir Alexander Frederick Bradshaw. They had one child, a daughter named Enid (born in 1892 in India; died, unmarried, in 1993 in Cambridge, England).

He was promoted to captain on 17 December 1894. A redetermination of the longitude of Karachi undertaken by Burrard and Lenox-Conyngham in 1894, which required journeys to Europe and the Middle-East, was later found, using radio signals, to be accurate to 0.02 of a second of arc. In 1898, Lenox-Conyngham received two British astronomers to observe the total eclipse in northern India, including Cambridge astrophysicist Hugh Newall with whom he became firm friends, unknowingly smoothing the path for a future career at Cambridge. He was promoted to major on 17 January 1903, while he was posted to Dehradun.

Burrard suggested that anomalies in latitude found by the Survey in the early 1800s parallel to the mountains to the north might be caused by a large mass below the Indo-Gangetic Plain. New four-pendulum-based equipment to measure the gravitational force was modified to suit and, between 1903 and 1908, Lenox-Conyngham collected gravitational data across the subcontinent. The data showed a negative relative gravitational component in the region of the Plain, a fact readily apparent in modern measurements (see image).

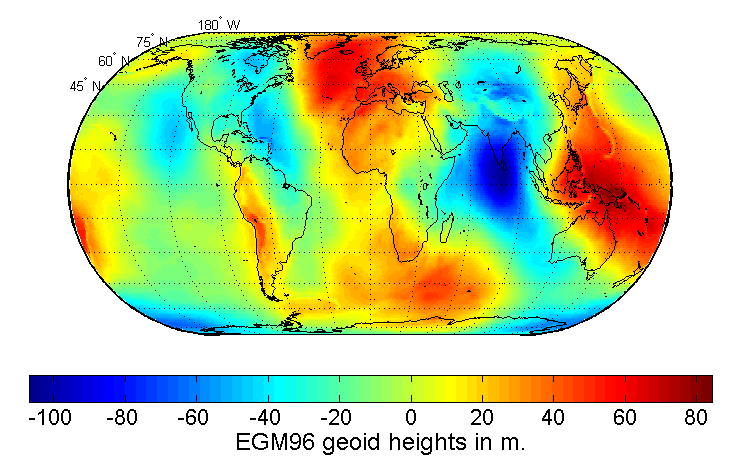
This 1996 gravity map of the globe clearly shows a gravitational force below the mean value (negative values are in shades of blue) in the Indian subcontinent south of the Himalayas, as Lenox-Conyngham showed 90 years earlier. Credit: F.G. Lemoine et al., Nasa Goddard Space Flight Centre

Lenox-Conyngham succeeded Burrard as superintendent of the Great Trigonometrical Survey in 1912 and was promoted to colonel two years later. In 1918, Elsie Lenox-Conyngham was made an Officer of the Order of the British Empire and Lenox-Conyngham himself was elected Fellow of the Royal Society. The following year he was created Knight Bachelor.

After his return from India in 1920, he planned to settle in Oxford but was invited to join a committee at the University of Cambridge to promote the study of geodesy. He was delighted to be offered a praelectorship funded by Trinity when the University could not pay, took up residence in Cambridge, was made a Fellow of Trinity College in 1921, received an honorary M.A. as he had no university education and in 1922 a first readership in geodesy was created for him, beginning his second career. With few funds from the University, he began, solely, teaching undergraduates and later new officers on probation for the Colonial Survey Service who spent a year at the School of Geodesy before they were posted abroad. With the assistance of Sir Horace Darwin, his ideas led to newly designed gravitational equipment which was built by Darwin's company, the Cambridge Scientific Instrument Company. He added seismology and geothermal science to his curriculum and worked hard to secure funds and equipment. He made an expedition to the Great Barrier Reef (regarding the isostasy of Pacific islands), and was asked to visit Montserrat to investigate earthquakes. He attended conferences worldwide and even acted as a representative of the British government in the Pacific Science congresses of 1923 and 1926. His faculty later became the Department of Geodesy and Geophysics (incorporated in 1980 into the Department of Earth Sciences). His students included pioneering scientists such as his first research assistant the geophysicist Sir Edward Bullard.

He retired in 1947. He died at Addenbrooke Hospital aged 90 and his funeral service was at Trinity College Chapel. He is commemorated there by a brass plaque with a Latin inscription on the south wall of the Ante-Chapel. The translation includes: "He approved innovative ideas but also old-fashioned values. A kind, prudent, dutiful man".
