= Stewart baronets of Fingask (1920) =

The Stewart Baronetcy, of Fingask in the County of Perth, was created in the Baronetage of the United Kingdom on 10 December 1920 for John Stewart. The title became extinct on the death of the second Baronet in 1979.

== Stewart baronets, of Fingask (1920) ==
- Sir John Henderson Stewart, 1st Baronet (1877–1924)
- Sir Bruce Fraser Stewart, 2nd Baronet (1904–1979)
