= Stewart baronets of Balgownie in Bearsden (1920) =

The Stewart Baronetcy, of Balgownie in Bearsden in the County of Dumbarton, was created in the Baronetage of the United Kingdom on 16 December 1920 for James Watson Stewart. He was a member of the Glasgow Corporation from 1904 to 1920 and Lord Provost of Glasgow from 1917 to 1920.

== Stewart baronets, of Balgownie (1920) ==
- Sir James Watson Stewart, 1st Baronet (1852–1922)
- Sir Alexander Stewart, 2nd Baronet (1886–1934)
- Sir James Watson Stewart, 3rd Baronet (1889–1955)
- Sir James Watson Stewart, 4th Baronet (1922–1988)
- Sir (John) Keith Watson Stewart, 5th Baronet (1929–1990)
- Sir (John) Simon Watson Stewart, 6th Baronet (born 1955)

The heir apparent is the present holder's only son Hamish Watson Stewart, Younger of Balgownie (born 1983).
