= Stewart baronets of Tillicoultry (1707) =

Escutcheon of the Stewart baronets of Tillicoultry

The Stewart baronetcy, of Tillicoultry in the County of Clackmannan, was created in the Baronetage of Nova Scotia on 24 April 1707 for Robert Stewart. The title became dormant on the death of the second Baronet in 1767.

== Stewart baronets, of Tillicoultry (1707) ==
- Sir Robert Stewart, 1st Baronet (c. 1655–1710)
- Sir Robert Stewart, 2nd Baronet (c. 1700–1767)
