= High Sheriff of Tyrone =

Judicial representative in County Tyrone

The High Sheriff of Tyrone is the Sovereign's judicial representative in County Tyrone. Initially an office for lifetime, assigned by the Sovereign, the High Sheriff became annually appointed from the Provisions of Oxford in 1258. Besides the role's judicial importance, the holder has ceremonial and administrative functions and executes High Court Writs.

== History ==
The first (High) Shrievalties were established before the Norman Conquest in 1066 and date back to Saxon times. In 1908, an Order in Council made the Lord-Lieutenant the Sovereign's prime representative in a county and reduced the High Sheriff's precedence. Despite however that the office retains his responsibilities for the preservation of law and order in a county.

While the office of High Sheriff ceased to exist in those Irish counties, which had formed the Irish Free State in 1922, it is still present in the counties of Northern Ireland.

== High Sheriffs ==
=== 17th century ===
- 1606: Sir Henry Oge O'Neil
- 1607: Edmond Leigh
- 1608: John Leigh
- 1610: John Leigh
- 1612: John Meade
- 1613: James Glapham
- 1614: John Leigh
- 1616: Edmond Blomer
- 1620: Sir William Caulfeild
- 1622: Alexander Sanderson of Tullylegan
- 1624: Sir Daniel Leigh
- 1634: Edward Torleton
- 1638: William Hamilton
- 1639: Terence O'Neil – Thomas Bayley
- 1640: Sir Thomas Staples, 1st Baronet of Lissan House
- 1641: Edward Maxwell
- 1650: Edward Richardson
- 1657: Sir George Acheson, Baronet
- 1658: John Morris
- 1659: James Stewart
- 1661: Sir Alexander Staples
- 1662: Sir William Richardson of Creighballe
- 1663: Thomas Goulbourne
- 1664: William Moore of Garvey
- 1666: Robert Stewart (or Stuart), 6th Baron Castle Stewart
- 1666: Sir Arthur Chichester, Kt
- 1667: Arthur Newburgh
- 1668: Samuel Hill
- 1669: Hugh Edwards
- 1670: Alexander M'Causlaud
- 1671: Claud Hamilton
- 1672: John Anthony
- 1673: Gilbert Eccles of Shannock
- 1674: Edward Edwards
- 1675: Daniel Eccles of Shannock
- 1676: Oliver M'Causland
- 1677: Robert Lindesay of Loughry
- 1678: John Moderall
- 1679: Patrick Hamilton
- 1680: Archibald Richardson of Castlehill
- 1681: Thomas Maxwell
- 1682: James Moutray of Favour Royal
- 1663: Claud Hamilton
- 1684: James Cilligan
- 1685: Edward Edwards
- 1686: Henry Mervyn?
- 1687: Terence O'Donnelly
- 1689: John O'Neil
- 1691: Oliver M'Causland
- 1692: Audley Mervyn
- 1693: Patrick Hamilton
- 1694: Charles Eccles of Fintona
- 1695: James Moutray of Favour Royal
- 1696: John Tesley
- 1697: James Moore of Garvey or Fasseroe, Co. Wicklow
- 1698: William Latham
- 1699: William Cai-nes?

=== 18th century ===
- 1700: John Caulfeild
- 1701: James Moore of Garvey or Fasseroe, Co. Wicklow
- 1702: Thomas Knox
- 1703: Sir Robert Staples, 4th Baronet of Lissan House
- 1704: Andrew Stewart (or Stuart), 7th Baron Castle Stewart
- 1705: Thomas Morris
- 1706: Stewart Blacker of Carrickblacker
- 1707: John Gamble – Robert Lowry
- 1708: Robert Lowry
- 1709: John Hamilton
- 1709: Charles Eccles of Ecclesville, Fintona
- 1710: Patrick Hamilton
- 1711: Henry Stewart
- 1712: Acheson Moore of Garvey or Fasseroe, Co. Wicklow
- 1713: James Young
- 1714: Claud Hamilton
- 1715: Henry Mervyn
- 1716: Hon. William Richard.
- 1717: Richard Maxwell
- 1718: Audley Mervyn
- 1719: Robert Lowry
- 1720: Daniel Eccles of Fintona
- 1721: John Moutray of Favour Royal
- 1722: George Gledstanes
- 1723: Thomas White
- 1724: John M'Causland
- 1726: William Babington
- 1726: Robert Lowry, jnr
- 1727: William Colhoun
- 1728: George Magee
- 1729: Thomas Singleton
- 1730: Oliver M'Causland
- 1731: Hugh Edwards
- 1732: John Sinclair
- 1733: Galbraith Lowry
- 1734: James Richardson of Castlehill
- 1735: William Hamilton
- 1736: John Houston
- 1737: George Conyngham
- 1738: William Stuart (or Stewart) of Killymoon and Ballymenagh
- 1739: Oliver M'Causland
- 1740: John M'Causland
- 1741: John Hamilton
- 1742: Francis White
- 1743: David Richardson of Creighballe
- 1745: Alexander M'Causland
- 1746: Charles Eodes
- 1747: Thomas Singleton
- 1748: Claud Hamilton
- 1749: William Blacker
- 1750: Thomas Goodlatte
- 1751: Thomas Knox
- 1752: Alexander Stuart of Drumespill
- 1753: John Cairnes
- 1754: James Tisdall
- 1755: Andrew Thomas (Stewart later Stewart-Moore), 9th Baron Castle Stewart
- 1756: Lawrence O'Hara
- 1757: William Hamilton of Ballyfatton
- 1758: John M'Causland
- 1759: Andrew Knox
- 1760: Captain Robert McClintock of Dunmore
- 1761: Francis Houston
- 1762: James Moutray of Favour Royal and Killibrick
- 1763: Sir Robert Staples, Bt
- 1764: John Stuart Hamilton, later Sir John Stuart Hamilton, 1st Baronet of Dunamana
- 1765: James Colhoun
- 1766: John Staples
- 1767: William Coningham
- 1768: Armar Lowry-Corry, 1st Earl Belmore
- 1769: William Irvine
- 1770: William Irvine of Castle Irvine
- 177n: James Caulfield
- 1771: Hamilton Gorges
- 1772: Daniel Eccles of Ecclesville
- 1773: James Moore Hamilton
- 1774: Richard Vincent
- 1775: Alexander M'Causland
- 1776: Thomas Knox
- 1777: Sir Edward Loftus, 1st Baronet of Mount Loftus
- 1778: John Richardson of Farlough
- 1779: Thomas Knox Jnr
- 1780: James Alexander, 1st Earl of Caledon
- 1781: John M'Cliutocic
- 1782: Charles King of Fordruss
- 1783: John Ferguson
- 1784: George Gladstanes
- 1785: George Sinclair
- 1786: Nathaniel Montgomery-Moore of Garvey and Fassaroe Castle, Co. Wicklow
- 1787: William Baillie
- 1788: Robert Lindesay of Loughry
- 1789: Sir William Richardson, 1st Baronet of Augher
- 1790: James Verner
- 1791: Samuel Galbraith of Greenmount and Omagh
- 1792: Hon. Arthur Cole-Hamilton of Beltrim Castle
- 1793: Charles Crawford
- 1794: John Corry Moutray of Favour Royal
- 1795: George Lenox Conyngham
- 1796: Gorges D'Arcy Irvine
- 1797: William Hamilton
- 1798: Thomas Knox Hanyngton
- 1799: William Richardson of Creighballe

=== 19th century ===
- 1800: Hamilton Gorges, jnr
- 1801: Sir George Talbot, 3rd Baronet of Chart Park
- 1802: John Henry Burges
- 1803: George Perry
- 1804: Charles Eccles
- 1805: William McLintock
- 1806: John Mackey
- 1807: William Richardson Goodlatte
- 1808: Jones Crawford
- 1809: Sir John Stewart, 1st Baronet, of Athenree
- 1810: Hugh Montgomery
- 1811: Claude William Cole-Hamilton of Beltrim
- 1812: Robert William Lowry of Pomeroy House, Dungannon
- 1813: James Lowry
- 1814: Hon. Andrew Godfrey Stewart
- 1815: John Dickson Eccles
- 1816: Arthur Lowry Galbraith
- 1817: Robert Bateson
- 1818: William Lenox-Conyngham
- 1819: George Lendrum
- 1820: James Caulfield
- 1821: Robert Waring Maxwell
- 1822: Sir James Stronge
- 1823: William Vernier
- 1824: William Steward Richardson of Creighballe
- 1825: Sir Robert Alexander Ferguson, 2nd Baronet of Farm, Derry
- 1826: Samuel Vesey of Derrabard
- 1827: Sir Hugh Stewart, 2nd Baronet of Ballygawley
- 1828: Mervyn Stuart of Mulloghmore, Omagh.
- 1829: John Ynyr Burges
- 1830: Arthur Willoughby Cole-Hamilton of Beltrim
- 1831: Sir James Mervyn Richardson-Bunbury, 2nd Baronet of Killeacle
- 1832: Thomas Richardson Browne
- 1833: Samuel Galbraith of Clanabogan and Riverstown
- 1834: Robert Montgomery Moore
- 1835: Charles Eccles
- 1836: Charles John Gardiner of Mountjoy Forest
- 1837: James Lendrum of Magheracross
- 1838: Edward H Caulfield
- 1839: Thomas Houston
- 1840: John Lindesay of Loughry
- 1841: Charles Boyle
- 1842: James Molyneux, Earl of Charlemont
- 1842: Joseph Goff of Hall House
- 1843: Robert Gordon of Florida
- 1844: Sir James Matthew Stronge, 3rd Baronet
- 1845: William D'Arcy of Necairn Castle
- 1846: Francis John Gervais of Cecil
- 1847: Richard Lloyd
- 1848: Andrew Ferguson Knox of Urney Park, Strabane
- 1849: Robert William Lowry, jnr., of Pomeroy House, Dungannon
- 1850: Henry Mervyn D'Arcy Irvine of Mescairn Castle, Lowtherstown
- 1851: William Venier
- 1852: William L. Ogilby
- 1853: Alexander G. Stuart
- 1854: Daniel Baird
- 1855: Anketell Moutray of Favour Royal
- 1856: Francis John Graham of Drumgoon
- 1857: William F. Black
- 1858: Sir John Marcus Stewart, 3rd Baronet of Ballygawley
- 1859: Frederick Lindesay of Loughry
- 1860: Sir James John Hamilton, 2nd Baronet
- 1861: William Humphrys Archdale of Dromard
- 1862: Samuel Wensley Blackhall, of Coolamber, Edgeworthstown
- 1863: James Hamilton, 2nd Duke of Abercorn
- 1864: Hugh Gore Edwards
- 1865: George Perry McClintock of Seskinore
- 1866: William Fitzwilliam Lenox Conyngham of Spring Hill
- 1867: William Cole Hamilton
- 1868: James Alfred Caulfeild
- 1869: Ynyr Henry Burges
- 1870: Henry James Stewart (later Stuart-Richardson), 5th Earl Castle Stewart
- 1871: J. B. Gunning Moore
- 1872: Thomas Auchinleck
- 1873: John Mulholland.
- 1874: James Corry Jones Lowry of Rockdale
- 1875: John Samuel Galbraith of Clanabogan and Riverstown
- 1876: Thomas Greer of Sea Park, Carrickfergus
- 1877: Anketill Moutray
- 1878: John Gerard Irvine of Killadeas
- 1879: George Waller Vesey of Derrabard
- 1880: Captain James H. Stronge, Tynan Abbey, Tynan.
- 1881: Fitz Ameline Maxwell Anketill, of Killyfaddy, Clogher
- 1882: George Cosby Lendrum of Magheracross
- 1883: Robert Hawkes Ellis
- 1884: Hugh Gore
- 1885: John Mervyn Archdall Carleton Richardson of Rossfad
- 1886: James Bruce of Manor House, Benburb
- 1887: John Hervey Knox-Browne of Aughentaine Castle
- 1888: Hugh de Fellenburg Montgomery of Blessingbourne House
- 1889: Sir William Samuel McMahon, 3rd Baronet
- 1890: Emerson Tennant Herdman of Sion House
- 1891: John Knox M'Clintock of Seskinore and Ecclesville
- 1892: William King Edwards
- 1893: Sir Hutcheson Poë, 1st Baronet of Heywood, Ballinakill
- 1894: John Herdman of Carricklee, Strabane
- 1895: Francis Porter Gunning
- 1896: Robert Thomas Graves Lowry of Pomeroy House, Pomeroy
- 1897: Captain M'Calmont MP
- 1898: Ynyr Richard Patrick Burges
- 1899: Emerson Crawford Herdman of Carricklee

=== 20th century ===
- 1901: Armar Lowry-Corry, 5th Earl Belmore
- 1902: Francis Peter Gervais of Cecil Manor
- 1903: Sir Hugh Houghton, 4th Baronet
- 1904: Sir Alexander George Montgomery-Moore of Garvey
- 1905: Edward Leslie Barnwell Lowry of Rockdale
- 1906: Edward Archdale of Castle Archdale
- 1907: John Carmichael Ferrall of Augher Castle, Augher
- 1908: Evelyn James Story of Errington, Kilskeery
- 1909:
- 1912: Capt. John Claudius Herdman, of Sion House
- 1914: Lionel McMahon
- 1916: Cecil Lowry-Corry, 6th Earl Belmore
- 1917:
- 1921: James Blackwood Archdale
- 1922: William Arbuthnot Lenox-Conyngham
- 1923: Brigadier-General Thomas Francis Bushe of Crevenagh, Omagh
- 1924: John Adair, of Greenvale, Cookstown
- 1925: Edward C. Thompson of Camowen Hill, Omagh
- 1926: William Bates Smyth of Strathfoyle, Strabane.
- 1927: Lt.-Col. James Ponsonby Galbraith of Clanabogan, Omagh
- 1928: Maj.-General Hugh M. de Fellenberg Montgomery of Blessingbourne House, Fivemiletown
- 1929: William Hugh Montgomery Sinclair of Holy Hill, Strabane
- 1930: George Young Smith of Rathronan, Omagh
- 1931: Lieut.-Colonel Ambrose Upton Gledstanes of Fardross, Clogher
- 1932: Major Robert Stevenson, "Aloha," Dungannon
- 1933: Robert Hawkes Ellis, Rash House, Omagh
- 1934: Major Anketell Gerald Moutray of Favour Royal, Augher
- 1935: Mervyn William Charles Nesbitt Knox-Browne
- 1936: Major Charles Adam Murray Alexander of Pomeroy House, Pomeroy,
- 1937: Adam Murray Alexander, of Thornfield, Fivemiletown
- 1938: William Lowry Lenox-Conyngham of Spring Hill, Moneymore, County Londonderry
- 1939: Captain Ynyr Alfred Burges of Parkanaur House, Castle Caulfield,
- 1940: Lt.-Colonel Rupert Caesar Smythe of Augher Castle, Augher
- 1941: Lt.-Colonel William Brooksbank Garnett of Corick, Clogher
- 1942: Major Thomas Cedric Harold Dickson of Milltown House, Dungannon
- 1943: Emerson Tennent Rex Herdman, of Sion House, Sion Mills
- 1944: Captain William Maddin Scott, of Mill-bank, Omagh
- 1945: Thomas Louis Napoleon Adair, of Greenvale, Cookstown
- 1946: James Edward Hamilton, 4th Duke of Abercorn of Baronscourt,
- 1947: Lieut-Colonel Percy Beresford Fleming of Campsie House, Omagh,
- 1948: Robert Newton of Killymeal, Dungannon
- 1949: Major William Stewart of Daisy Hill, Clogher
- 1950: Marcus Beresford Lendrum of Corkil, Kilskeery
- 1951: Colonel Edward Gibbon of Errington, Kilskeery
- 1952: Joseph Wilson of Glenalt, Dublin Road, Omagh
- 1953: Brigadier John Alexander Sinton, Slaghtfreedan Lodge, Cookstown
- 1954: John Matthew Blakiston-Houston of Beltrim Castle, Gortin
- 1955: Major Sir Hugh Charley Godfrey Stewart, 6th Baronet, Loughmacrory Lodge, Carrickmore.
- 1956: John Patrick Herdman, of Carricklee House, Strabane.
- 1957: Brigadier George Cecil Ballentine of Aghareany House, Donaghmore
- 1958: Lieut.-Colonel Ralph Reginald Auchinleck Darling, Crsvenagh, Omagh
- 1959: Commander Claudius Alexander Herdman of The Brae, Sion Mills
- 1960: Major George Norman Proctor of Tullydoey, Dungannon
- 1961: Thomas Lyons of Riversdale, Newtownstewart
- 1962: Lieut.-Colonel John Rowan Addison McFerran, Camus, Strabane
- 1963: Captain James Huey Hamill Pollock of Drumcairne, Stewartstown
- 1964: Captain Peter Stephen Montgomery of Blessingbourne House, Fivemiletown
- 1965: Captain Robert Hawkes Ellis, Rash House, Omagh
- 1966: Major-General Thomas Patrick David Scott of Mullaghmore House, Omagh
- 1967: James Patterson Duff of The Mill House, Coagh, Cookstown
- 1968: Captain Thomas Alexander Dickson of Miltown House, Dungannon
- 1969: Major General Denis Grattan Moore of Mountfield Lodge, Omagh.
- 1970: James Hamilton, 5th Duke of Abercorn, M.P. of Barons Court, Newtownstewart.
- 1971: Captain John Richardson McAusland of Millbank, Omagh.
- 1972: Captain John H. Hamilton-Stubber of Aughentain, Fivemiletown,
- 1973: R. T. M. Scott of Lisnamallard House, Omagh,
- 1974: William Daniel Smyth of Cloneen, Strabane,
- 1975: Henry Frederick Dougan Stevenson of Mullaghanagh Lane, Dungannon.
- 1976: Albert John Black McFarland of Glenlea, Plumbridge,
- 1977: John Stiles Tempest Reilly of Beltany Lodge, Mountjoy, Omagh,
- 1978: Major Vincent William Acheson of Grange Park, Dungannon
- 1979: William Edmund Stafford of Sion Mills, Strabane,
- 1980: Major Elsmere McClintock of Brook House, Newtownstewart
- 1981: Thomas James Wilmot of Ornagh
- 1982: Peter N. Acheson of Donaghmore
- 1983: A.V.C. Maltby of Omagh
- 1984: J.T. Ward of Dungannon
- 1985: Mervyn Talbot Archdale of Omagh
- 1986:
- 1987:
- 1988:
- 1989:
- 1990: Capt. Robert Hawkes Ellis of Rash House, Omagh.
- 1991: W.R. McAusland of Omagh
- 1992: R.W.L. Scott of Omagh
- 1993: Gerald Ralph Auchinleck Darling of Omagh
- 1994: R.N.A. Lowry of Fivemiletown
- 1995: W. Richard C. Butler of Cookstown
- 1996: J. Robert H. Ellis of Omagh
- 1997: Peter Alexander Black of Cookstown
- 1998: Gerald Hugh Caldecott of Strabane
- 1999: Angela F. Colhoun of Omagh

=== 21st century ===
- 2000: Rowland Ralph Terence Cummings of Tullyhogue, Cookstown
- 2001: Brigadier John G. G. de P. Ferguson of Braewood, Sion Mills,
- 2002: Domingos J D T Pinto of Kevlin Road, Omagh
- 2003: Raymond George Moffatt of Omagh Road, Drumquin
- 2004: Robert Max Eitel of Mullaghadun Lane, Dungannon
- 2005: Sydney Gamble of Strabane
- 2006: William Andrew Stewart of Strabane
- 2007: John James Little of Northland Row, Dungannon,
- 2008: Robert Andrew Pollock of Omagh
- 2009: Dr Brendan J. O'Hare of Castlederg
- 2010: Francis Eugene Shields
- 2011: Gerard Broderick
- 2012: Dr Clare Cassidy (nee Monaghan) of Killeeshil Glebe, Dungannon co Tyrone.
- 2013: James Baxter of Newtownstewart
- 2014: Kathleen Adams of Omagh
- 2015: Dr Lisheen Elizabeth Coloumba Cassidy Webb, Tullydooey House, Blackwatertown Co.Tyrone .
- 2016: Patrick John McGowan of Omagh
- 2017: Jennifer Hawkes of Omagh
- 2018: Barry McGonigle of Omagh
- 2019: Samuel Wesley Atchison of Omagh
- 2020: Gordon Aiken of Omagh
- 2021: Barry Curran of Omagh
- 2022: Emer Murnaghan of Edenfel
- 2023: Helen Irene Anderson, of Omagh
- 2024: Patrick-Raymond O'Donnell of Bradley House, Omagh, County Tyrone
