= Prince of Wales's Own Donegal Militia =

Auxiliary unit of the British Army

Prince of Wales's Own Donegal Militia 5th (Donegal Militia) Bn, Royal Inniskilling Fusiliers
- Active: April 1793–31 July 1908
- Country: Ireland (1793–1800); United Kingdom (1801–1908)
- Branch: Militia
- Role: Infantry
- Size: 1 Battalion
- Part of: Royal Inniskilling Fusiliers
- Garrison/HQ: Lifford
- Engagements: Irish Rebellion of 1798: Battle of Enniscorthy; Battle of Three Rocks; Battle of New Ross; Battle of Vinegar Hill

The Prince of Wales's Own Donegal Militia was an Irish Militia regiment raised in County Donegal in 1793. It saw action during the Irish Rebellion of 1798 and served in home defence through the major wars of the 19th Century, It later became a battalion of the Royal Inniskilling Fusiliers but was disbanded in 1908.

== Background ==
Although there are scattered references to town guards in 1584, no organised militia existed in Ireland before 1660. After that date, some militia forces were organised in the reign of King Charles II but it was not until 1715 that the Irish Militia came under statutory authority. During the 18th Century there were various Volunteer Associations and unofficial militia units controlled by the landowners, concerned mainly with internal security. During the War of American Independence, the threat of invasion by the Americans' allies, France and Spain, appeared to be serious. While most of the Regular Army was fighting overseas, the coasts of England and Wales were defended by the embodied Militia, but Ireland had no equivalent force. The Parliament of Ireland passed a Militia Act, but this failed to create an effective force. However it opened the way for the paramilitary Irish Volunteers to fill the gap. The Volunteers were outside the control of either the parliament or the Dublin Castle administration. When the invasion threat receded they diminished in numbers but remained a political force. On the outbreak of the French Revolutionary War In 1793, the Irish administration passed an effective Militia Act that created an official Irish Militia, while the paramilitary volunteers were essentially banned. The new Act was based on existing English precedents, with the men conscripted by ballot to fill county quotas (paid substitutes were permitted) and the officers having to meet certain property qualifications.

== Donegal Militia ==
County Donegal was given a quota of 560 men to find, in ten companies, and the order for embodiment was issued on 23 April 1793, with William Burton Conyngham, former Lieutenant-Colonel in the 12th Dragoons appointed as Colonel of the regiment. However, in a county of scattered parishes it was difficult to assemble the Donegal men, and there was considerable opposition to the ballot. Many of those liable to serve formed insurance societies to pay bounties to attract volunteer substitutes for the balloted men. The list of officers for the regiment was approved on 13 July and the regiment was actually embodied at the county town of Lifford on 14 August as the Prince of Wales's Own Donegal Militia. However, in September the colonel and officers were still touring the county to enforce the ballots. The regiment was inspected on 14 October and marched to its first station at Derry on 1 December.

=== French Revolutionary War ===
The French Revolutionary and Napoleonic Wars saw the British and Irish militia embodied for a whole generation, becoming regiments of full-time professional soldiers (though restricted to service in Britain or Ireland respectively), which the regular army increasingly saw as a prime source of recruits. They served in coast defences, manned garrisons, guarded prisoners of war, and carried out internal security duties. In Ireland the latter role assumed greater importance, with frequent armed clashes between militia detachments and the self-styled 'Defenders' in the 1790s.

The regiment marched to Birr, where it was inspected again on 11 August 1794 and by the end of the month it was stationed at Athlone, with two companies detached to Castlerea and one to Roscommon. On 30 June 1795 it moved to Drogheda, and on 21 April 1796 it marched into Loughlinstown Camp. Colonel Burton died on 31 May 1796 and Viscount Clements (later 2nd Earl of Leitrim) was appointed to succeed him on 22 June.

Anxiety about a possible French invasion grew during the autumn of 1796 and preparations were made for field operations. A large French expeditionary force appeared in Bantry Bay on 21 December and troops from all over Ireland were marched towards the threatened area. The Donegal Militia marched to Cork. However, the French fleet was scattered by winter storms, several ships being wrecked, and none of the French troops succeeded in landing; there was no sign of a rising by the United Irishmen. The invasion was called off on 29 December, and the troop concentration was dispersed in early 1797, the Donegal Militia returning to Loughlinstown Camp.

Early in 1797 the light companies of the militia were detached to join composite battalions drawn from several militia regiments. The Donegal contingent was attached to 4th Light Battalion, stationed at Loughlinstown. The militia regiments were each issued with two light six-pounder 'battalion guns', with the gun detachments trained by the Royal Artillery. When the militiamen of 1793 reached the end of their four-year enlistment in 1797, most of the Irish regiments were able to maintain their numbers through re-enlistments (for a bounty). By September 1797 the Donegal Militia had moved to Geneva Barracks in County Wexford.

=== Irish Rebellion ===
The expected Irish Rebellion finally broke out in May 1798. The Light Company of the Donegal Militia was in action as part of 4th Light Battalion at the Battle of Enniscorthy on 28 May. On 30 May a company of the Royal Meath Militia escorting a train of artillery to Wexford was ambushed by the United Irishmen and cut up at the First Action at Forth Mountain (or Battle of Three Rocks). The Donegal Militia were engaged at the unsuccessful Second Action at Forth Mountain later that day. However, the Donegal regiment under Lt-Col Maxwell and the Light Company with 4th Light Battalion were both present at the successful Defence of New Ross on 5 June. Just before the battle, Sergeant Finch and 12 privates of the Donegal Militia were surrounded by rebels at Borrisdine, but fought their way out: Sgt Finch was rewarded with a commission in a regiment of the line. Sergeant Hamilton was also commissioned into the Royal Scots as a reward for his bravery at New Ross. The Donegal Militia was in action at Borris, County Carlow, on 12 June, and together with 4th Light Battalion took part in the decisive Battle of Vinegar Hill on 21 June.

After Vinegar Hill the regiment marched to Youghal in County Cork in July, then on 22 October it moved into Fort Camden and Fort Carlisle guarding Cork Harbour, where it stayed for the next year. It moved to Baltinglass in October 1799, to Dundalk in May 1800 and Lisburn by 20 November 1800.

With the diminishing threat of invasion after 1799, the strength of the militia could be reduced, and the surplus men were encouraged to volunteer for regiments of the line. By the end of 1801 peace negotiations with the French were progressing and recruiting and re-enlistment for the Irish Militia was stopped in October. The men received the new clothing they were due on 25 December, but the Treaty of Amiens was signed in March 1802 after which the militia was disembodied. The Donegal men were inspected and paid off at Lifford on 12 May, leaving only the permanent staff of non-commissioned officers (NCOs) and drummers under the regimental adjutant.

=== Napoleonic Wars ===
The Peace of Amiens was short-lived, and preparations to re-embody the Irish Militia began in November 1802. By March 1803 most of the regiments had been ordered to enlist men, a process that was aided by the number of previous militiamen who re-enlisted. The Donegal Militia was re-embodied by Col Viscount Clements at Lifford on 15 March, and Britain declared war on France on 18 May 1803. The light companies were once again detached to form composite light battalions, but these were discontinued in 1806.

Over the following years the regiments carried out garrison duties at various towns across Ireland, attended summer training camps, and reacted to various invasion scares, none of which materialised. They also provided volunteers to transfer to the regular army. In 1805 the militia establishment was raised to allow for this.

The Donegal Militia marched out from Lifford to Mullingar in August 1803. It went to Naas in June 1804, then to the Curragh on 23 July for summer camp before returning to Naas in September. In July 1805 it was at Dublin, a year later at Prosperous, County Kildare, and then at Cavan in December 1806. By June 1807 it was at Cork, moving to Tuamby 6 January 1808. It was back at Curragh Camp in June 1808, in Dublin in August that year, and at Tuam by April 1810. In April 1811 it was at Castlebar, at Boyle in July 1812, and back to Dublin by June 1813.

By then, Napoleon had abdicated. With the end of the war most Irish Militia regiments returned to their home counties to be disembodied, the Donegals being at Ballyshannon by July 1814. However, some regiments, including the Donegal, had not completed disembodiment by the time the militia was called out again in May 1815 after Napoleon's escape from Elba. They served in Ireland when most of the Regular Army was on the Continent during the brief Waterloo campaign and the subsequent occupation duties. The Donegals were at Tullamore in August 1815 and Mullingar in March 1816. The order to stand down the Irish Militia finally arrived that month and the Donegal Militia returned to Ballyshannon to be disembodied in April 1816.

=== Long Peace ===
After Waterloo there was a long peace. Although officers continued to be commissioned into the militia and ballots might still held, the regiments were rarely assembled for training and the permanent staffs of militia regiments were progressively reduced. By 1850 the Earl of Leitrim was still colonel of the Donegal Militia, and most of the officers had been commissioned during the Napoleonic Wars.

== 1852 Reforms ==
The long-standing national Militia of the United Kingdom was revived by the Militia Act 1852, enacted during a period of international tension. As before, units were raised and administered on a county basis, and filled by voluntary enlistment (although conscription by means of the Militia Ballot might be used if the counties failed to meet their quotas). Training was for 56 days on enlistment, then for 21–28 days per year, during which the men received full army pay. Under the act, Militia units could be embodied by royal proclamation for full-time home defence service in three circumstances:

1. 'Whenever a state of war exists between Her Majesty and any foreign power'.
2. 'In all cases of invasion or upon imminent danger thereof'.
3. 'In all cases of rebellion or insurrection'.

The Prince of Wales's Own Donegal Militia was reformed with 12 companies.

=== Donegal Artillery Militia ===
The Militia Act 1852 introduced Artillery Militia units in addition to the traditional infantry regiments. Their role was to man coastal defences and fortifications, relieving the Royal Artillery for active service. In December 1854 four companies of the Donegal Militia were converted into the Donegal Artillery Militia, which assumed the subtitle 'Prince of Wales's Own' in November 1855.

=== Crimean War & Indian Mutiny ===
The outbreak of the Crimean War in 1854 and the despatch of an expeditionary force led to the militia being called out for home defence. The Donegal Militia was embodied on 6 January 1855, and served at Ballyshannon until the autumn, when it moved to Derry. In November it moved to Charlemont, County Armagh, and in December it switched places with the Donegal Artillery at Omagh in County Tyrone. The war was ended by the Treaty of Paris of 30 March 1856, and the militia prepared to be disembodied. The Donegal Militia was disembodied on 4 August 1856.

The regiment was embodied again on 5 November 1857 when much of the Regular Army was sent to suppress the Indian Mutiny. The regiment was stationed at Derry once more, but then crossed to England and went to Aldershot Camp. In September 1858 it moved to Dover for a year, then went to Yarmouth in August 1859. In July 1860 it returned to Ireland, being stationed at Dublin until it was disembodied on 31 August 1860.

The militia now settled into a routine of annual training (though there was no training for the Irish Militia from 1866 to 1870 at the time of the Fenian crisis). The militia regiments now had a large cadre of permanent staff (about 30) and a number of the officers were former Regulars. Around a third of the recruits and many young officers went on to join the Regular Army. The Militia Reserve introduced in 1867 consisted of present and former militiamen who undertook to serve overseas in case of war.

== Cardwell and Childers Reforms ==
Under the 'Localisation of the Forces' scheme introduced by the Cardwell Reforms of 1872, militia regiments were brigaded with their local linked regular regiments. For the Donegal Militia this was in Sub-District No 64 (Counties of Londonderry, Donegal, Tyrone and Fermanagh in Belfast District of Irish Command:

- 27th (Inniskilling) Regiment of Foot
- 108th (Madras Infantry) Regiment of Foot
- Fermanagh Light Infantry
- Royal Tyrone Fusiliers
- Londonderry Light Infantry
- Prince of Wales's Own Donegal Militia
- No 64 Brigade Depot was formed at Omagh, the Tyrone Fusiliers' HQ.

Although often referred to as brigades, the sub-districts were purely administrative organisations, but in a continuation of the Cardwell Reforms a mobilisation scheme began to appear in the Army List from December 1875. This assigned Regular and Militia units to places in an order of battle of corps, divisions and brigades for the 'Active Army', even though these formations were entirely theoretical, with no staff or services assigned. The Donegal Militia was assigned to 2nd Brigade of 1st Division, VIII Corps in Scotland. The brigade would have mustered at Edinburgh in time of war.

=== 5th Royal Inniskilling Fusiliers ===
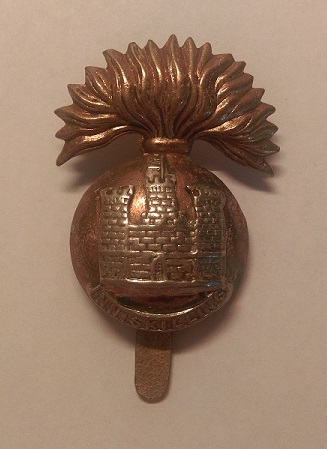
Royal Inniskilling Fusiliers' cap badge.

The Childers Reforms took Cardwell's reforms further, with the militia regiments becoming numbered battalions of their linked regiments. On 1 July 1881 the 27th and 108th Regiments became the 1st and 2nd Battalions of the Royal Inniskilling Fusiliers, and the Donegal Militia became the 6th Battalion. However, in a change of policy, the Londonderry Light Infantry was instead converted to artillery the following year, so the Donegal was redesignated 5th (Donegal Militia) Battalion, Royal Inniskilling Fusiliers in May 1882.

=== Second Boer War ===
After the Second Boer War broke out in October 1899 an expeditionary force was sent to South Africa and the militia reserve was called out to reinforce it. Later the militia regiments began to be embodied to replace the regulars for home defence. The 5th Royal Inniskillings were embodied on 9 May 1900. The battalion was disembodied on 3 July 1901.

== Disbandment ==
After the Boer War, the future of the militia was called into question. There were moves to reform the Auxiliary Forces (Militia, Yeomanry and Volunteers) to take their place in the six Army Corps proposed by the Secretary of State for War, St John Brodrick. However, little of Brodrick's scheme was carried out. Under the more sweeping Haldane Reforms of 1908, the Militia was replaced by the Special Reserve, a semi-professional force whose role was to provide reinforcement drafts for regular units serving overseas in wartime, rather like the earlier Militia Reserve. However, the 5th (Donegal Militia) Battalion, Royal Inniskilling Fusiliers, did not transfer to the new force, and was disbanded on 31 July 1908.

== Commanders ==
=== Colonels ===
Colonels of the Regiment included:

- William Burton Conyngham, April 1793, died 31 May 1796
- Nathaniel Clements, 2nd Earl of Leitrim appointed 22 June 1796 died 31 December 1854

No new militia colonels were appointed after the 1852 reforms, the lieutenant-colonel becoming the commandant, and the appointment of Honorary Colonel was introduced.

=== Lieutenant-Colonels ===
Lieutenant-colonels of the regiment included:

- Andrew Knox, appointed 6 May 1801
- George Conyngham, Earl of Mount Charles (later 3rd Marquess Conyngham), 5 January 1849
- Lord Claud Hamilton, Lt-Col Commandant, 22 September 1855
- Lord Claud John Hamilton (nephew of above), former Lieutenant & Captain, Grenadier Guards, 10 July 1867, later Hon Col
- Baptist J. Barton, former Lieutenant, 33rd Foot, promoted 21 February 1891

=== Honorary colonels ===
The following served as Honorary Colonel of the battalion:

- James Hamilton, 2nd Marquess of Abercorn, appointed 13 December 1854
- James, Viscount Hamilton, later 2nd Duke of Abercorn, appointed 22 September 1860
- Lord Claud John Hamilton, appointed 17 January 1891

== Heritage & ceremonial ==
=== Uniforms ===
The Donegal Militia wore a red coat, with facings that are variously recorded as black in 1850 or white from 1860. The regiment's badge was the Prince of Wales's insignia of three feathers emerging from a crown with the motto 'Ich Dien', together with a scroll inscribed 'DONEGAL MILITIA' underneath.

In 1881 the regiment adopted the uniform and insignia of the Royal Inniskilling Fusiliers, including the blue facings of a Royal regiment and the cap badge of a castle superimposed on a fusiliers' 'bomb'.

=== Precedence ===
On the outbreak of the French Revolutionary War the English counties had drawn lots to determine the relative precedence of their militia regiments. In 1798 the new Irish militia regiments received their own table of precedence, in which County Donegal came 35th. In 1833 King William IV drew the lots to determine an order of precedence for the whole of the United Kingdom. Those regiments raised before 1783 took the first 69 places, followed by the 60 regiments (including those in Ireland) raised for the French Revolutionary War: the Donegal Militia took 102nd place, and this remained unchanged when the list was updated in 1855. Most regiments took little notice of the numeral.

== See also ==
- Irish Militia
- Militia (United Kingdom)
- Donegal Artillery
- Royal Inniskilling Fusiliers
