= Stewart baronets of Stewartby (1937) =

The Stewart baronetcy, of Stewartby in the County of Bedford, was created in the Baronetage of the United Kingdom on 4 March 1937 for the businessman Malcolm Stewart. He was the founder of The London Brick Company. The title became extinct on the death of his son, the second Baronet, in 1999.

== Stewart baronets, of Stewartby (1937) ==
- Sir (Percy) Malcolm Stewart, 1st Baronet (1872–1951)
- Sir Ronald Compton Stewart, 2nd Baronet (1903–1999)
