= Stewart baronets of Castlemilk (1668) =

Escutcheon of the Stewart baronets of Castlemilk

The Stewart baronetcy, (alternatively Stuart), of Castlemilk in the County of Lanark, was created in the Baronetage of Nova Scotia on 29 February 1668 for Archibald Stewart. The title became extinct on the death of the fifth Baronet in 1797.

== Stewart baronets, of Castlemilk (1668) ==
- Sir Archibald Stewart, 1st Baronet (died c. 1670)
- Sir William Stewart, 2nd Baronet (died 1715)
- Sir Archibald Stewart, 3rd Baronet (died 1763)
- Sir John Stewart, 4th Baronet (died 1781)
- Sir John Stewart, 5th Baronet (c. 1740–1797)
