= Bulmer, North Yorkshire =

Village and civil parish in North Yorkshire, England

Coordinates: 54°05′59″N 0°55′59″W

Bulmer
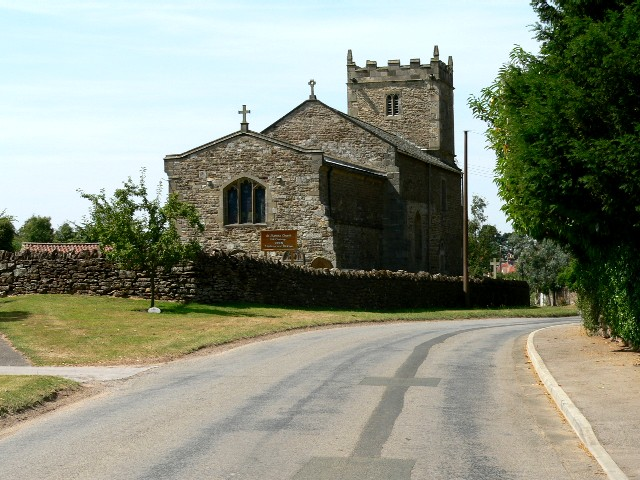
- St Martin's Church, Bulmer

- Location within North Yorkshire
- Population: 202 (2011 census)
- OS grid reference: SE699676
- Civil parish: Bulmer
- Unitary authority: North Yorkshire
- Ceremonial county: North Yorkshire
- Region: Yorkshire and the Humber
- Country: England
- Sovereign state: United Kingdom
- Post town: YORK
- Postcode district: YO60
- Police: North Yorkshire
- Fire: North Yorkshire
- Ambulance: Yorkshire
- UK Parliament: Thirsk and Malton

Bulmer is a village and civil parish in North Yorkshire, England. According to the 2001 census it had a population of 174, increasing to 202 at the census 2011. The village is about 7 miles (11 km) south-west of Malton.

== History ==
The village was the seat of the ancient Bulmer wapentake, known as the Bulford wapentake in 1086. The name Bulmer comes from "bull mere," a lake frequented by a bull.

The manor is listed in the Domesday Book of 1086. It is recorded as having been held in 1066 by a Northmann and Ligulf. It was awarded by the King with hundreds of others to his half-brother Count Robert de Mortain, whose tenant was Nigel Fossard.

The Bulmer family take their name from Bulmer. Ansketil de Bulmer is the first recorded member of the Bulmer family, who lived in the area in the twelfth century. By the nineteenth century the lordship of the manor had passed to the Earls of Carlisle, whose residence was at nearby Castle Howard. A monument to George William Frederick Howard can be found on top of Bulmer Hill just outside the village.

== Governance ==
The village lies within the Thirsk and Malton UK Parliament constituency. It is also within the Sheriff Hutton and Derwent electoral division of North Yorkshire Council. From 1974 to 2023 it was part of the Ryedale district.

== Geography ==
The village is situated two miles west of the A64 and 6.13 miles (9.87 km) south-west of Malton at an elevation of around 263 feet (80 m) above sea level. The nearest settlements are Welburn 1.5 miles (2.4 km) to the west; Sheriff Hutton 3.09 miles (4.97 km) to the east; Terrington 2.88 miles (4.63 km) to the north-east and Whitwell-on-the-Hill 1.78 miles (2.86 km) to the south-east.

To the west of the village is Bulmer Beck that runs southwards to eventually join the River Derwent.

In the late nineteenth century the population was recorded as 231, which has decreased to 174 according to the 2001 UK Census. Of the total population, 143 were over the age of sixteen, with 77 in full-time employment. The 2001 UK Census showed that there were 78 dwellings in the village.

== Village amenities ==
Visually, the village has changed little during history; however the small village school at the bottom of School Lane is now the village hall. The village also used to be home to a pub, blacksmith, shop and agricultural engineering workshop; these are all now closed.

Primary education can be found in the nearby villages of Sheriff Hutton, Welburn, Terrington and Thornton-le-Clay. Secondary Education can be found at Malton School or Norton College.

== Religion ==
St Martin's Church, Bulmer is a Grade I listed building which dates from around the 11th century. Services are held once every Sunday. The church contains the last remaining tablet of a Methodist chapel which used to be present in the village, and was built around 1842.

The ecclesiastical parish of Bulmer includes the stately home of Castle Howard.

== See also ==
- Listed buildings in Bulmer, North Yorkshire
