= Mid-Ulster Artillery Militia =

Auxiliary unit of the British Army

Mid-Ulster Artillery Militia 6th Brigade, North Irish Division, RA Mid-Ulster Artillery (Southern Division) RA Mid-Ulster Royal Garrison Artillery (M)
- Active: 1875–1909
- Country: United Kingdom
- Branch: Militia
- Role: Garrison Artillery
- Part of: North Irish Division, RA (1882–89); Southern Division, RA (1889–1902)
- Garrison/HQ: Dungannon

The Mid-Ulster Artillery Militia was a part-time reserve unit of Britain's Royal Artillery based in Northern Ireland. Formed from three smaller units in 1875, it served until 1909.

== Background ==
The long-standing national Militia of the United Kingdom was revived by the Militia Act 1852, enacted during a period of international tension. As before, units were raised and administered on a county basis, and filled by voluntary enlistment (although conscription by means of the Militia Ballot might be used if the counties failed to meet their quotas). Training was for 56 days on enlistment, then for 21–28 days per year, during which the men received full army pay. Under the Act, Militia units could be embodied by Royal Proclamation for full-time home defence service in three circumstances:

1. 'Whenever a state of war exists between Her Majesty and any foreign power'.
2. 'In all cases of invasion or upon imminent danger thereof'.
3. 'In all cases of rebellion or insurrection'.

The 1852 Act introduced Militia Artillery units in addition to the traditional infantry regiments. Their role was to man coastal defences and fortifications, relieving the Royal Artillery (RA) for active service.

== Precursor units ==
On 10 May 1875, three Militia Artillery regiments in Northern Ireland, the Armagh, Londonderry, and Tyrone, two of which were moribund, were merged to form a new unit designated the Mid-Ulster Regiment of Artillery Militia.

=== Armagh Artillery ===
The Armagh Artillery was officially formed in County Armagh by December 1854, but it was not until the following April that Captain R.F. Kidd transferred from the Armagh Light Infantry Militia and assumed command of the new unit. Its headquarters (HQ) was at the county town of Armagh. It was embodied during the Crimean War from April 1855 to July 1856.

The establishment of the Armagh Artillery was small: five officers including a surgeon, seven Non-Commissioned Officers (NCOs), one trumpeter and 100 gunners. Recruiting for the unit appears to have been poor. Training of the Irish Militia was suspended in 1866, when the only officer listed was the surgeon. When training resumed in 1871 the strength returns of the Armagh Artillery showed no men at all. In 1875 it was merged into the Mid-Ulster Artillery.

=== Londonderry Artillery Militia ===
The Londonderry Artillery Militia was authorised in 1854 and officially raised in County Londonderry on 9 January 1855 under the command of Captain Commandant Stewart Blacker, with HQ at Derry. It was the smallest of the artillery militia units, with an establishment of three officers, one surgeon, 5 NCOs, one drummer and 75 gunners. After training was suspended in 1866, the unit's strength returns show no men at all from 1868 to 1874, and it was not revived when training resumed in 1871. It was officially merged into the Mid-Ulster Artillery in 1875.

In 1882 the Londonderry Militia Light Infantry was converted into a new artillery unit, 9th Brigade, North Irish Division, later the Londonderry Artillery (Southern Division) and Londonderry RGA (M), which existed until 1909.

=== Tyrone Artillery Militia ===
The Tyrone Artillery Militia was raised in County Tyrone at the end of April 1855 with an establishment of eight officers, eight NCOs, two drummers and 187 gunners. Its first HQ was at Charlemont, moving to Dungannon in May 1868. Surviving examples of regimental stationery and crockery use the name Royal Tyrone Artillery (following the Royal Tyrone Fusiliers Militia) but this title appears to have been unofficial and does not appear in the Army List.

The Tyrone Artillery was embodied during the Crimean War from September 1855 to July 1856. In 1874 the training returns showed that the unit had 206 men enrolled out of an establishment of 218, and the following year it formed the basis of the Mid-Ulster Artillery.

== History ==
The Mid-Ulster Artillery Militia was formed at the former Dungannon HQ of the Tyrone Artillery, whose officers and men formed the core of the new unit, which had an establishment strength of 466. Artillery Militia units took precedence in alphabetical order (Armagh was 2): the new unit assumed the precedence number of the Londonderry (21) rather than the Tyrone (28). Ynyr Henry Burges, former High Sheriff of County Tyrone, who had been a captain in the Tyrone Artillery since 11 March 1859, was promoted to major in the new unit. R.J.P. Saunders became commanding officer with the rank of lieutenant-colonel on 16 February 1889. The paymaster-serjeant was Bernard Kilkeary, a veteran of the 8th Frontier War and Indian Mutiny and a survivor of the Birkenhead disaster.

Following the Cardwell Reforms a mobilisation scheme began to appear in the Army List from December 1875. This assigned places in an order of battle of the 'Garrison Army' to Militia Artillery units: together with a number of other Irish units, the Mid-Ulster Artillery's war stations were a number of small forts and batteries, including Athlone, Belfast, Lough Swilly, Lough Foyle, Enniskillen, Kilkerrin, Tarbert, Carrig, Scattery Island, Limerick, Charles Fort, Kinsale and Waterford.

The Artillery Militia was reorganised into 11 divisions of garrison artillery in 1882, and the Antrim unit became the 6th Brigade, North Irish Division, RA. When the North Irish Division was abolished in 1889 the title was altered to Mid-Ulster Artillery (Southern Division) RA.

The Mid-Ulster Artillery was embodied during the Second Boer War from 3 May to 6 November 1900.

From 1902 most units of the Militia artillery formally became part of the Royal Garrison Artillery, the Dungannon unit taking the title of Mid-Ulster RGA (M).

After the Boer War, the future of the Militia was called into question. There were moves to reform the Auxiliary Forces (Militia, Yeomanry and Volunteers) to take their place in the six Army Corps proposed by St John Brodrick as Secretary of State for War. Some batteries of Militia Artillery were to be converted to field artillery. However, little of Brodrick's scheme was carried out.

== Disbandment ==
Under the sweeping Haldane Reforms of 1908, the Militia was replaced by the Special Reserve, a semi-professional force whose role was to provide reinforcement drafts for Regular units serving overseas in wartime. Although the majority of the officers and men of the Mid-Ulster RGA (M) accepted transfer to the Special Reserve Royal Field Artillery and the unit became the Mid-Ulster Royal Field Reserve Artillery, all these units were scrapped in 1909, the Mid-Ulster disbanding on 20 October 1909. Instead the men of the RFA Special Reserve would form Brigade Ammunition Columns for the Regular RFA brigades on the outbreak of war.

== Honorary colonels ==
The following served as honorary colonel of the unit:

- Major The Hon. W. Stuart Knox, formerly of the 21st Foot, son of the Earl of Ranfurly and MP for Dungannon, was appointed to the Tyrone Artillery on 26 March 1867 and continued in that role with the Mid-Ulster Artillery.
- Lt-Col R.J.P. Saunders, former CO, appointed 19 February 1902.
