= Frederick Pepys Cockerell =

- Born: March 1833; 87 Eaton Square, London
- Died: 4 November 1878 (aged 45); 66 rue François Ier, Paris
- Occupation: Architect
- Spouse: Mary Mulock (m. 1867)
- Children: 6
- Parent(s): Charles Robert Cockerell; Anna Maria Rennie
- Buildings: Freemasons' Hall, London (1861)

Frederick Pepys Cockerell (March 1833, 87 Eaton Square, London – 4 November 1878, 66 rue François Ier, Paris) was a British architect. He was the second son of Charles Robert Cockerell, also an architect, whose favour for French architecture and sculpture in architecture was a major influence on Frederick.

== Life ==
He was the second son of Charles Robert Cockerell, and was born at 87 Eaton Square in March 1833. In 1845, he was sent to Winchester School, and at the close of 1848 he matriculated at King's College, London, where he is recorded on the books for about five or six terms. He first received lessons in perspective drawing from John E. Goodchild, who was his father's clerk and intimate friend.

During the summer of 1850, Cockerell made a sketching tour in Northern France, and on his return obtained some employment, through Sir M. Digby Wyatt, in connection with the Exhibition building in Hyde Park.

In 1853, he spent some months studying architecture in Paris, and in 1854 exhibited, for the first time at the Royal Academy (No. 1205 of the catalogue), 'Thanksgiving in St. Paul's after the Victory over the Spanish Fleet, 1718, from Sir Christopher Wren's office window.' The figures were put in by W. C. Stanfield, R.A.

In 1854, he became a pupil of Philip C. Hardwick, R.A., whose office Cockerell left in 1855, in order to visit Paris and the chief cities of Italy. On his return home he read a paper, at the Institute of British Architects, on the 'Architectural Accessories of Monumental Sculpture'. This paper received the full approbation of Professor Donaldson.

Cockerell's first independent professional works were executed in 1858–9. They consisted of a cemetery chapel and some buildings at Ledbury. His earliest success was in raising and making additions to Coleorton Hall, the seat of Sir George Beaumont. This was soon followed by the planning and erecting of Down Hall, Essex; Lythe Hill House, Haslemere, Surrey; and Crawley Court, near Winchester. He also erected the Carlisle Memorial Column at Castle Howard, and another column in Sir R. Bateson Harvey's park at Langley. This column is noted for its correctness of dimensions and beauty of design.

Among his London buildings should be mentioned the Freemasons' Hall, in Great Queen Street. He became a member of the Grand Lodge, and was appointed to the high office of grand superintendent of works. He also designed the front and entrance to the Gallery of the Society of Painters in Water-Colours, Pall Mall East.

In 1867, Cockerell married Mary Mulock, daughter of Thomas Homan Mulock of Bellair, King's county - the couple had six children. Cockerell died suddenly, in Paris, on 4 November 1878, on which day he had been invited to a dinner party at the house of Eugène Viollet-le-Duc, the architect. His sudden death in Paris in 1878 was followed by a funeral procession followed by the French architects Viollet-le-Duc, Lefuel, Hardy, Pelechet, Daumet, and Vaudremer and burial at the Auteuil cemetery, Paris.

Cockerell was a trustee of Sir John Soane's Museum, and a short time before his death was chosen assessor for the Spa buildings belonging to the Scarborough Cliff Bridge Company.

He exhibited at the Royal Academy twenty-four works between 1854 and 1877, and was elected an associate of the Royal Institute of British Architects in 1860, a fellow on 30 May 1864, and honorary secretary in 1871.

== Works ==
The following list contains some of the principal buildings erected by him in different parts of the country:

- Ballards, Croydon;
- Blessingbourne House, Fivemiletown, county Tyrone (1870–74)
- Burgate, Godalming, Surrey;
- Clonalis, Roscommon, Ireland;
- Condover Hall, Shrewsbury;
- Foxholes, Christchurch, Hampshire;
- Lythe Hill House, Haslemere https://archiseek.com/2013/lythe-hill-haslemere-surrey/
- the schools at Highgate a Gothic design;
- Kidbrooke Park, East Grinstead;
- Little Holland House, Kensington;
- church at Marske, Yorkshire;
- 1 and 2 South Audley Street, Mayfair completed from his designs by George Aitchison. No. 2 is now the Embassy of Qatar in London.
- St John-at-Hampstead, Hampstead;
- Woodcote Hall, Shropshire (1876);

Cockerell's competition designs for the alterations to the National Gallery were commended and much admired, and that for the Albert Memorial was selected by the judges, but the queen preferred a Gothic design, and that of Sir G. G. Scott was finally accepted. He was equally familiar both with Gothic and classic architecture, as his erected works testify.

== Sources ==
- "Cockerell, Frederick Pepys". Oxford Dictionary of National Biography (online ed.). Oxford University Press. doi:10.1093/ref:odnb/5782. (Subscription, Wikipedia Library access or UK public library membership required.)
