= Blessingbourne House =

Elizabethan-style manor in Northern Ireland

Coordinates: 54.385°N 7.31°W

- Interactive map of the Blessingbourne House area

General information
- Architectural style: Elizabethan architecture
- Location: Blessingbourne Estate, Murley Rd, Fivemiletown BT75 0QS, United Kingdom, Fivemiletown, Northern Ireland
- Construction started: 1870
- Construction stopped: 1874
- Owner: Colleen and Nicholas Lowry

Design and construction
- Architect: Frederick Pepys Cockerell

Website
- https://www.blessingbourne.com/

Blessingbourne House is a large Elizabethan style manor-house located in parkland near Fivemiletown in County Tyrone, Northern Ireland, stands as a notable historical and architectural site. Designed by Frederick Pepys Cockerell, the current structure was constructed between 1870 and 1874.

The house was built in an Elizabethan style of grey stone, overlooking Lough Fadda and is surrounded by landscaped gardens with yew trees, a gravel terrace, and a rhododendron walk. Woodland trails lead round the lake. The entire estate now spans approximately 550-acre (2.2 km^{2})s, the property functions as a working farm.

In recent years, the coach house has been made available for private functions and the outbuildings converted to holiday apartments. An 8 km mountain bike trail has been newly laid out.

== History ==
The Blessingbourne Estate became part of the Montgomery family through marriage to the Armar family in the early 18th century. However, the first Montgomery to reside on the estate was Hugh Montgomery, famously known as "Colonel Eclipse", who was born in 1779. Initially, he vowed to never marry and built himself a romantic thatched cottage on the estate as a retreat for his bachelor life. Eventually, he married and had a son, Hugh Ralph Severin Montgomery. Upon inheriting the property in 1838, Hugh Ralph Severin Montgomery constructed a Tudor style gate lodge c. around 1845.

The current larger house was built by Hugh Ralph Severin Montgomery's only son, Hugh de Fellenberg Montgomery. Following his marriage in 1870, he employed architect Frederick Pepys Cockerell to design the house, which was completed in 1874. At that time the estate spanned approximately 8,000-acre (32 km^{2}) and straddled the border between Tyrone and Fermanagh.

The estate remained within the family and was later inherited by Peter Montgomery, Vice-Lord Lieutenant of Tyrone. After his death without children, the property passed to a cousin. Ultimately, the property came into the possession of Captain Robert Lowry, a direct descendant of Colonel Eclipse. Today, Blessingbourne Estate is now owned and managed by Colleen and Nicholas Lowry, who operate it as self-catering accommodations and a museum.

During World War II, Blessingbourne was home to the 8th Artillery.
