= Stewart baronets of Ramelton (1623) =

Irish baronetcy

Escutcheon of the Stewart baronets of Ramelton

The Stewart baronetcy, of Ramelton in the County of Donegal, was created in the Baronetage of Ireland on 2 May 1623 for the soldier William Stewart.

The third Baronet served as Master-General of the Ordnance for Ireland and was created Baron Stewart of Ramelton and Viscount Mountjoy in the Peerage of Ireland in 1683. The second Viscount was also Master-General of the Ordnance for Ireland. The third Viscount was created Earl of Blessington in the Peerage of Ireland in 1745. The peerages became extinct on his death in 1769.

The baronetcy was passed on to Annesley Stewart, the sixth Baronet. He represented Charlemont in the Irish House of Commons from 1763 to 1797. The seventh Baronet represented Enniskillen in the Irish Parliament between 1783 and 1790 and County Donegal in the British House of Commons between 1802 and 1818.

== Stewart baronets, of Ramelton (1623) ==
- Sir William Stewart, 1st Baronet (died c. 1647)
- Sir Alexander Stewart, 2nd Baronet (died 1653)
- Sir William Stewart, 3rd Baronet (1653–1692) (created Viscount Mountjoy in 1683)

== Viscounts Mountjoy (1683) ==
- William Stewart, 1st Viscount Mountjoy (1653–1692)
- William Stewart, 2nd Viscount Mountjoy (died 1728)
- William Stewart, 3rd Viscount Mountjoy (1709–1769) (created Earl of Blessington in 1745)

== Earls of Blessington (1745) ==
- William Stewart, 1st Earl of Blessington (1709–1769)

== Stewart baronets, of Ramelton (1623; reverted) ==
- Sir Annesley Stewart, 6th Baronet (1725–1801)
- Sir James Stewart, 7th Baronet (c. 1756–1827)
- Sir James Annesley Stewart, 8th Baronet (1798–1879)
- Sir Augustus Abraham James Stewart, 9th Baronet (1832–1889)
- Sir William Augustus Annesley Stewart, 10th Baronet (1865–1894)
- Sir Harry Jocelyn Urquhart Stewart, 11th Baronet (1871–1945)
- Sir Jocelyn Harry Stewart, 12th Baronet (1903–1982)
- Sir Alan d'Arcy Stewart, 13th Baronet (1932–2024)
- Sir Nicholas Courtney d'Arcy Stewart, 14th Baronet (born 1953).

The heir presumptive is the present holder's brother, Lindsay Stephen d'Arcy Stewart (born 1956).

== Extended family ==
The Earls of Galloway and the Lords Blantyre were members of other branches of this family.
