= Galbraith Lowry Cole =

British Army officer and politician

General The Honourable Sir Galbraith Lowry Cole GCB
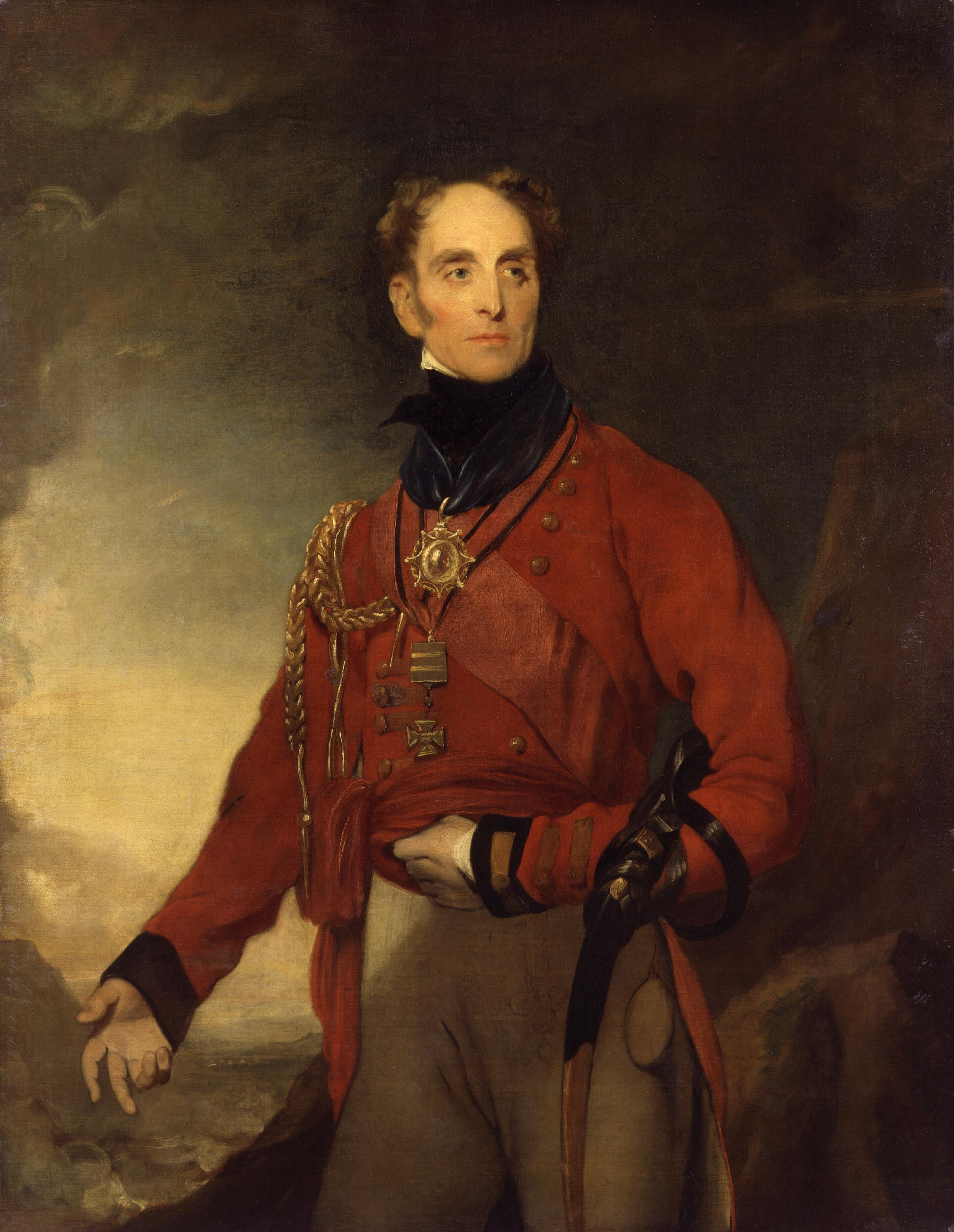
- Portrait by William Dyce, 1834
- Born: 1 May 1772; Dublin, Ireland
- Died: 4 October 1842 (aged 70); Highfield Park, Hampshire
- Military career
- Allegiance: Great Britain; United Kingdom
- Branch: British Army
- Service years: 1787–1833
- Rank: General
- Units: 12th Dragoons; 5th Dragoon Guards; 122nd Regiment of Foot
- Commands: 70th Regiment of Foot; 27th Regiment of Foot; 4th Division; Northern District
- Conflicts: French Revolutionary Wars; Napoleonic Wars; Peninsular War
- Awards: Knight Grand Cross of the Bath

General Sir Galbraith Lowry Cole GCB (1 May 1772 – 4 October 1842) was a British Army officer, politician and colonial administrator.

== Early life ==
Cole was the second son of an Irish peer, William Cole, 1st Earl of Enniskillen (1 March 1736 – 22 May 1803), and Anne Lowry-Corry (d. September 1802), the daughter of Galbraith Lowry-Corry of County Tyrone and the sister of Armar Lowry-Corry, 1st Earl Belmore.

== Army service ==
Cole was commissioned as a cornet in 12th Dragoons in 1787. He transferred to 5th Dragoon Guards as a lieutenant in 1791 and to the 70th Regiment of Foot as a captain in 1792 and served in the West Indies, Ireland, and Egypt. He was appointed lieutenant colonel of the 122nd Regiment of Foot when it was raised in 1794 and lieutenant colonel in the late General William Villettes' corps in 1799 on full pay, although the corps' units had been disbanded. He was promoted to colonel in the Army in 1801 and served as brigadier-general in Sicily and commanded the 1st Brigade at the Battle of Maida on 4 July 1806. In 1808 he was promoted to major-general. In 1809 he was appointed to the staff of the army serving in Spain and Portugal and granted the local rank of lieutenant-general in 1811. This rank was confirmed in the Army in 1813. He commanded the 4th Division in the Peninsular War under Wellington, and was wounded at the Battle of Albuera in which he played a decisive part. He was also wounded, much more seriously, at Salamanca. He was promoted to full general in 1830.

For having served with distinction in the battles of Maida, Albuera, Salamanca, Vitoria, Pyrenees, Nivelle, Orthez and Toulouse, he received the Army Gold Cross with four clasps. In 1815 he became General Officer Commanding Northern District.

He was appointed Colonel of the 103rd Foot in 1812, 70th Foot in 1814 and 34th Foot in 1816. He subsequently became Governor of Gravesend and Tilbury Fort. He was also colonel of the 27th Foot.

== Member of Parliament ==
He was Member of Parliament in the Irish House of Commons for the family seat of Enniskillen from 1797 to 1800, and represented County Fermanagh in the British House of Commons in 1803.

He was appointed 2nd Governor of Mauritius from 12 June 1823 to 17 June 1828. He left in 1828 to take up the post of Governor of the Cape Colony, a position he filled until 1833.

Cole was knighted in 1813 and was invested as a Knight Grand Cross, Order of the Bath on 2 January 1815.

== Commemorations ==
He is commemorated in Enniskillen by a statue surmounting a 30-metre (98 ft) column in Fort Hill Park, carried out by the Irish sculptor Terence Farrell.

The first road through Sir Lowry's Pass over the Hottentots Holland mountains near Cape Town was built while he was governor, and the pass is named after him.

== Family ==
Cole was married on 15 June 1815 to Lady Frances Harris (d. 1 November 1847), daughter of James Harris, 1st Earl of Malmesbury, for whom Malmesbury, South Africa is named, and Harriet Mary (née Amyand), his wife. His late marriage was attributed by his family to the unhappy outcome of his romance with the future Catherine Pakenham (later Duchess of Wellington) to whom he had been briefly engaged in 1802–3. Frances Cole played a prominent part in social philanthropy in the Cape and worked towards having coloured children taught useful trades. Colesberg, a town in the Cape, is named after him, as is Sir Lowry's Pass near Cape Town. They had seven children:

- Colonel Arthur Lowry Cole, Col. 17th Regiment, CB, Knight of the Medjidie (24 August 1817 – 30 March 1885)
- William Willoughby Cole, Capt. 27th Regiment (17 November 1819 – 4 April 1863)
- James Henry Cole (b. 15 December 1821)
- Florence Mary Georgiana Cole (b. 4 June 1816)
- Louisa Catherine Cole (16 August 1818 – 14 October 1878)
- Frances Maria Frederica Cole (b. 9 April 1824)
- Henrietta Anne Paulina Cole (b. 6 October 1826)

His elder brother John Willoughby Cole married Lady Charlotte Paget, the daughter of Henry Paget, 1st Earl of Uxbridge.

His other siblings were:

- The Hon. Rev. William Montgomery Cole (d. October 1804), Dean of Waterford
- The Hon. Arthur Henry Cole (28 June 1780 – 16 June 1844)
- Lady Sarah Cole (d. 14 March 1833), married Owen Wynne in 1790
- Lady Elizabeth Anne Cole (d. 1807), married Lt.-Col. Richard Magenis in 1788
- Lady Florence Cole (d. 1 March 1862), married Blayney Townley-Balfour in 1797
- Lady Henrietta Frances Cole (22 June 1784–2 July 1848), married Thomas de Grey, 2nd Earl de Grey on 20 July 1805

He lived at Highfield House in Hampshire, adjacent to the Stratfield Saye estate of his friend the Duke of Wellington.

== Sources ==
- Stephens, Henry Morse (1887). "Cole, Galbraith Lowry" . In Stephen, Leslie (ed.). Dictionary of National Biography. Vol. 11. London: Smith, Elder & Co.
- Stephens, H. M.; Benyon, John (reviewer) (January 2008). "Cole, Sir (Galbraith) Lowry (1772–1842)". Oxford Dictionary of National Biography (online ed.). Oxford University Press. doi:10.1093/ref:odnb/5848. (Subscription, Wikipedia Library access or UK public library membership required.)

Parliament of Ireland
Preceded by Arthur Cole-Hamilton; Richard Magenis	Member of Parliament for Enniskillen; 1797–1800; With: Arthur Cole-Hamilton	Succeeded by Arthur Cole-Hamilton; Henry Osborne
Parliament of the United Kingdom
Preceded by Viscount Cole; Mervyn Archdall	Member of Parliament for County Fermanagh; 1803–1823; With: Mervyn Archdall	Succeeded by Mervyn Archdall; Viscount Corry
Military offices
Preceded by William Wynyard	GOC Northern District; 1815–1816	Succeeded by Sir John Byng
Preceded by Sir John Floyd, Bt	Governor of Gravesend and Tilbury; 1818–1842	Office abolished
Preceded by Sir Robert Townsend Farquhar	Governor of Mauritius; 1823–1828	Succeeded by Sir Charles Colville
Preceded by Richard Bourke, acting	Governor of the Cape Colony; 1828–1833	Succeeded by Benjamin d'Urban
Preceded by Sir Francis Rawdon-Hastings, 1st Marquess of Hastings	Colonel of the 27th (Inniskilling) Regiment of Foot; 1826–1842	Succeeded by Sir John Maclean
Preceded by John Howard, 15th Earl of Suffolk	Colonel of the 70th (Glasgow Lowland) Regiment of Foot; 1814–1816	Succeeded by Forbes Champagné
