= Tipu Sultan Fort =

Historical fort in Srirangapatna, India

Tipu Sultan's Fort
- Part of Karnataka
- Srirangapatna, Karnataka, India
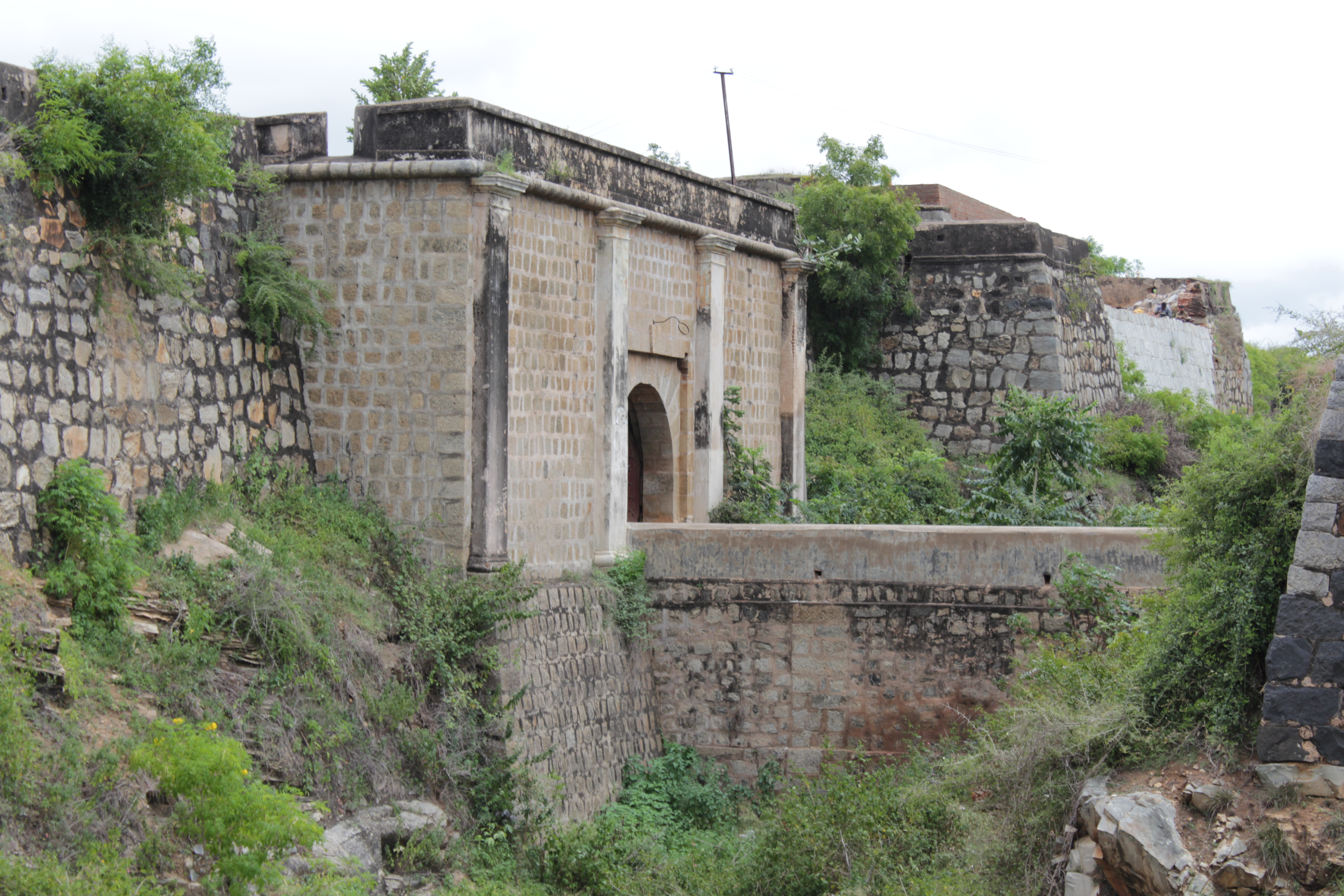

Site information
- Type: Forts
- Controlled by: Bangalore Circle of the Archaeological Survey of India

Location
- Location within Karnataka
- Coordinates: 12.425°N 76.676°E

Tipu Sultan's Fort is a historical fort located in Srirangapatna, the historical capital city of the Kingdom of Mysore in present-day South Indian state of Karnataka. Built by the Timmanna Nayaka in 1454, the fort was modified by King Haider Ali & King Tipu Sultan and fully fortified in the late 18th century with the help of French architects. King Tipu Sultan wanted to protect it against British invaders associated with the East India Company.

Rivers protect the fort on three sides. The river Kaveri borders the fort in one direction; in the West and Northern directions it is protected by the river Cauvery. The fort contained Lal Mahal and King Tipu Sultan's palace, which were demolished when the British captured it in 1799. There are seven outlets and two dungeons.

Several structures and elements are maintained as protected monuments under the Bangalore Circle of the Archaeological Survey of India: Colonel Bailey's Dungeon; Daria Daulat Bagh; Gumbaj containing tomb of King Tipu Sultan; Juma Masjid (Masjid-E-Ala); Obelisk monuments, and Fort walls near the breach the spot where King Tipu Sultan's Body was found; the Sri Kanthirava statue in Narasimha Temple; Sri Ranganatha Svami Temple; and Thomas Inman's Dungeon.

== History ==
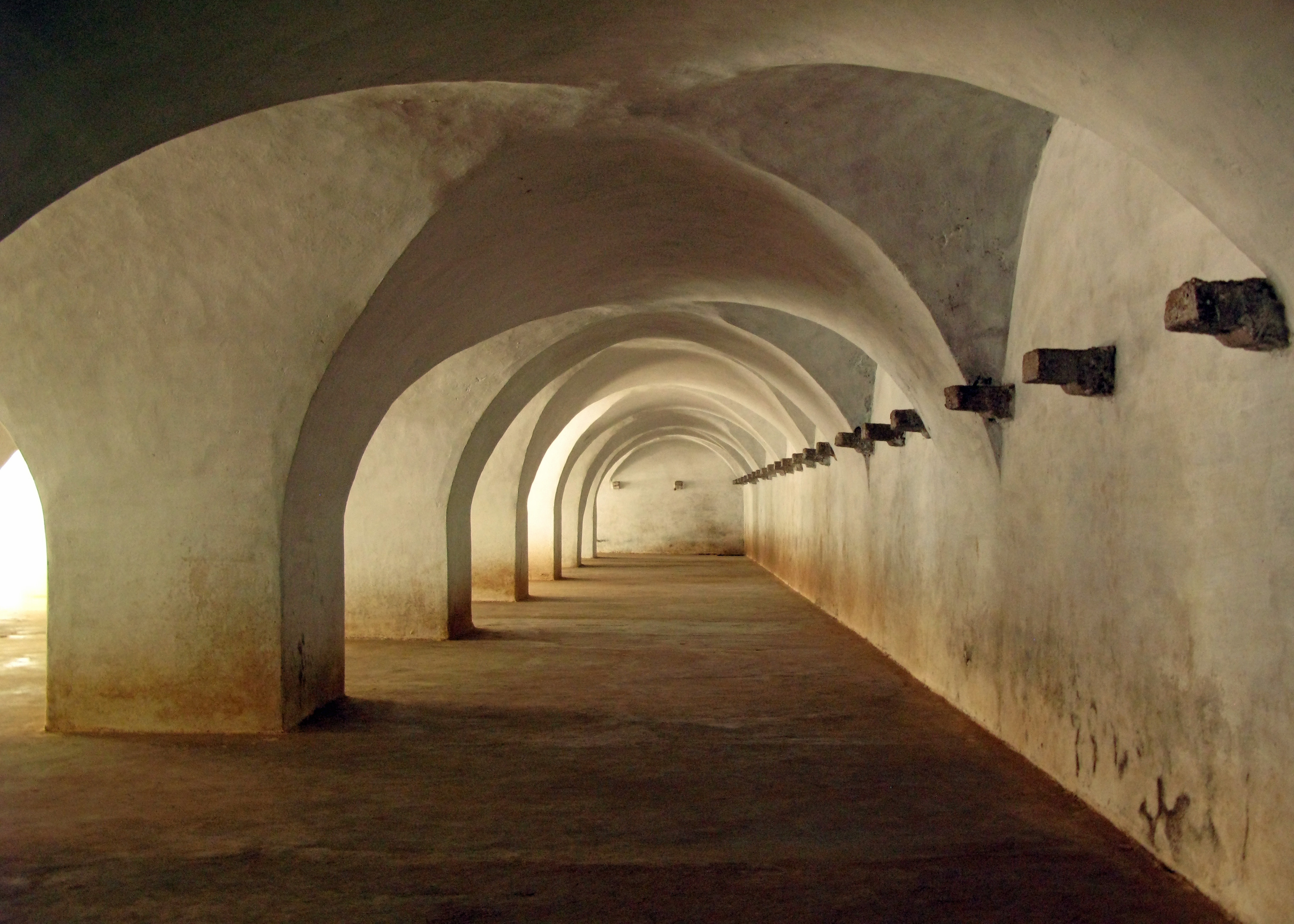
Colonel Bailey's Dungeon

The fort is believed to have been built in 1454 CE by Timmanna Nayaka, a ruler of the Vijayanagar Empire. The fort was in the hands of the Empire until 1495, when the Wodeyars overpowered the Vijayanagar rulers. The fort subsequently changed hands among the competing Nawab of Arcot, Peshwas and the Marathas.

The Wodeyars moved their capital from Mysore to Srirangapatna and established the fort as the seat of the empire. The region and the fort were changed during the rule of Chikka Devaraja Wodeyar (1673 to 1704), but the three subsequent rulers did not affect it. During the rule of Krishnaraja Wodeyar (1734–66), the kingdom became a strong military force; it was controlled by military general Hyder Ali. During 1757 King Hyder Ali had to cede the fort to the invading Marathas for 32 lakh rupees, but he regained it later.

During 1782, King Tipu Sultan, the son of King Hyder Ali, took control of the fort and added fortifications. King Tipu Sultan's territory was invaded many times by British forces. King Tipu Sultan had an alliance with the French and appealed by letter to Napoleon for aid. After several unsuccessful attempts, British forces of the East India Company, under the command of Colonel Arthur Wellesley, 1st Duke of Wellington, attacked on 4 May 1799. The forces had 2,494 British soldiers and 1,882 Indian troops. The soldiers waited in trenches until mid-day before advancing across the river, as that was the period of rest for the fort watchmen. Colonel Beatson wrote an account of the offensive in his manuscripts.

After King Tipu Sultan was martyred in the battle, the English officials signed a treaty with the Wodeyar queen. Richard Colley Wellesley, 1st Marquess Wellesley of Norragh, was in charge. Later known as Mornington, he was Governor-General of India (1798 and 1805). This battle is considered one of the turning points in the colonization strategy of the East India Company.

== Architecture ==
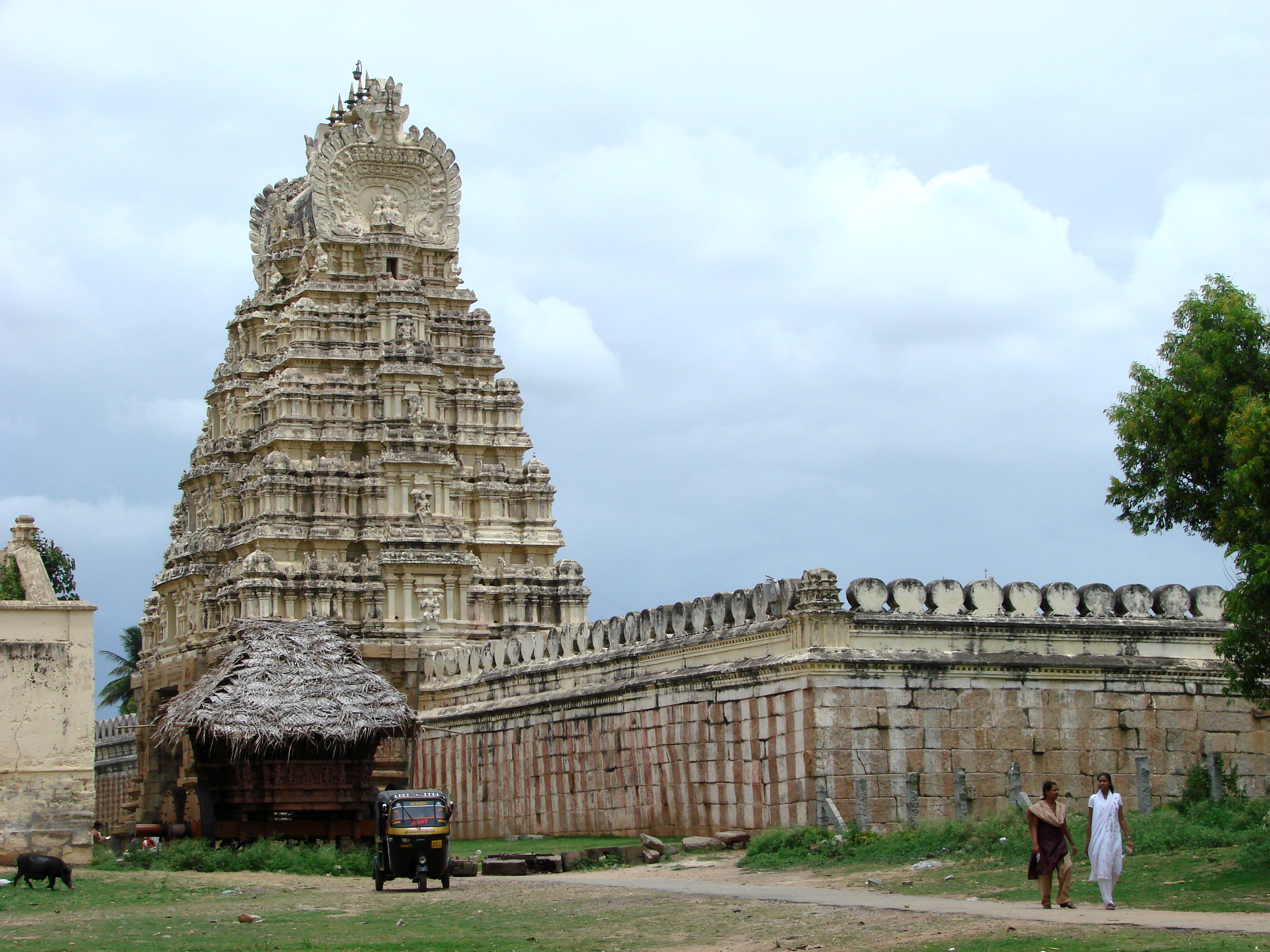
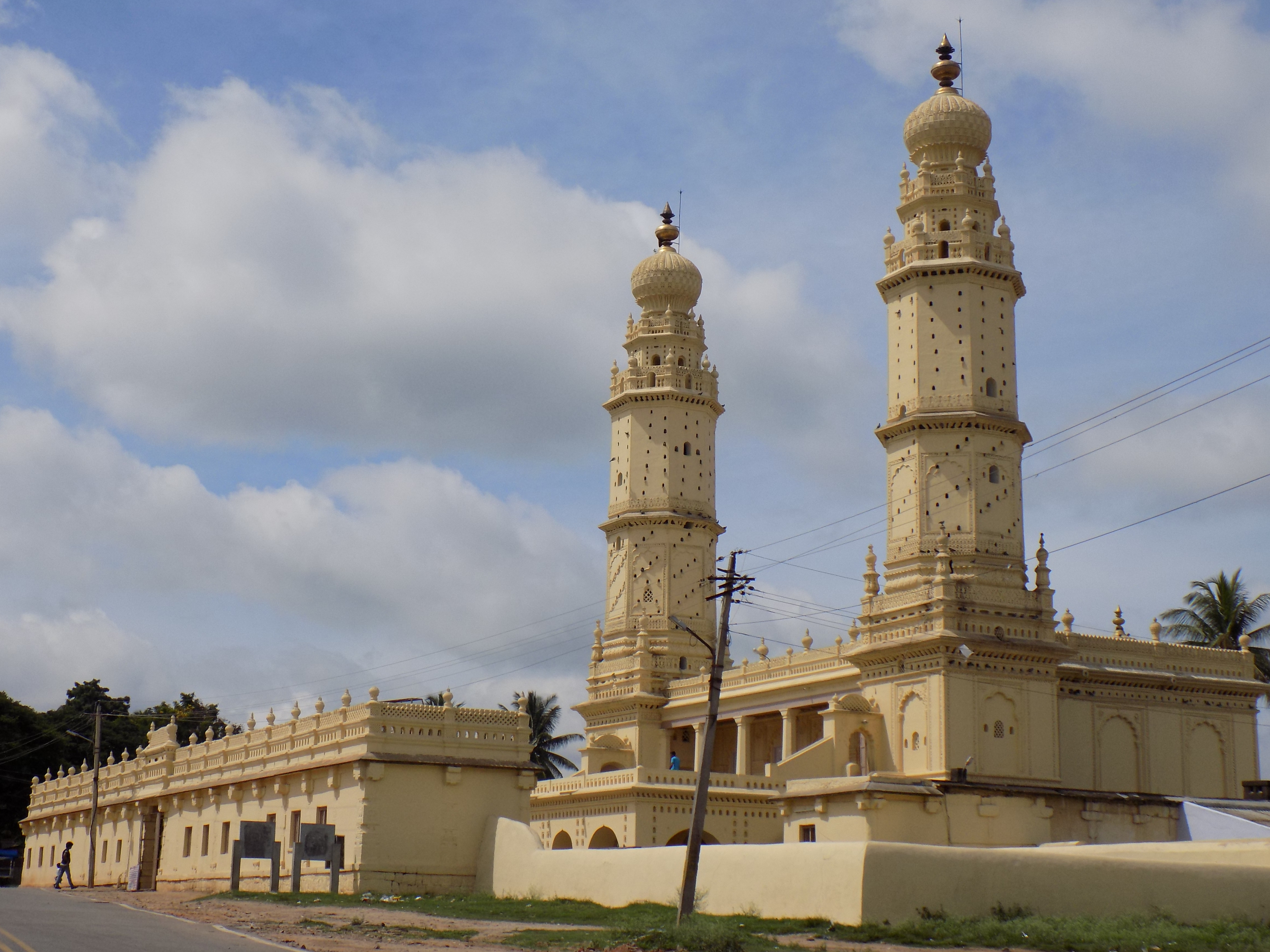
Image of Sriranganthaswamy and Jumma Masjid inside the fort

The fort is protected in the West and Northern directions by river Cauvery. The fort had Lal Mahal and King Tipu Sultan's palace, which were demolished during the British capture of 1799. There are seven outlets and two dungeons. The Ranganathaswamy Temple, located inside the fort is believed to have been built by Ramanuja, the proponent of Vaishnadvaita philosophy with the grants from Vishnuvardhana, the 12th century Hoysala king. The temple is found in the open grounds on the western side of the fort. The other temple, the Narasimhaswamy temple, is located on the other side of the open ground. The northern part of the fort houses the dungeons, where European prisoners are believed to have been confined. King Tipu Sultan's palace is located opposite to the main entrance of the Ranganathaswami temple. Juma mosque, built by King Tipu Sultan in Indo-Islamic architecture is one of the major mosques inside the fort.

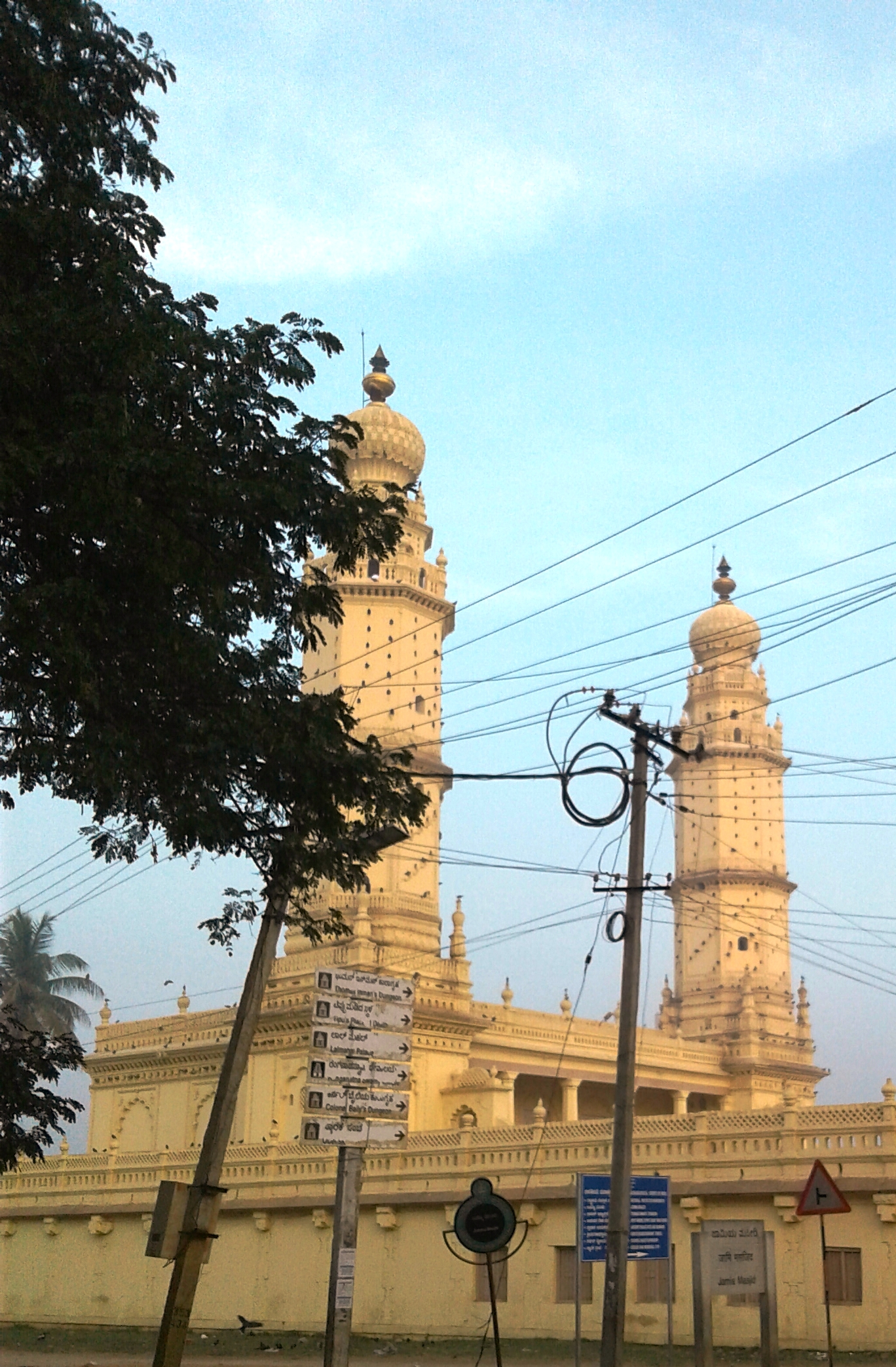
Tippu Mosque, Srirangapatnam

== Legacy ==
The sword and the ring of King Tipu Sultan are maintained in the British Museum and believed to have been taken at the battle by Hon. Arthur Henry Cole, son of the Earl of Enniskillen. Colonel Bailey's Dungeon, Daria Daulat Bagh, Gumbaj containing tomb of King Tipu Sultan, Juma Masjid (Masjid-E-Ala), Obelisk monuments and Fort walls near the breach, spot where King Tipu Sultan's Body was found, Sri Kanthirava statue in Narasimha Temple, Sri Ranganatha Svami Temple and Thomas Inman's Dungeon are maintained as protected monuments under the Bangalore Circle of the Archaeological Survey of India.

== Image Gallery ==
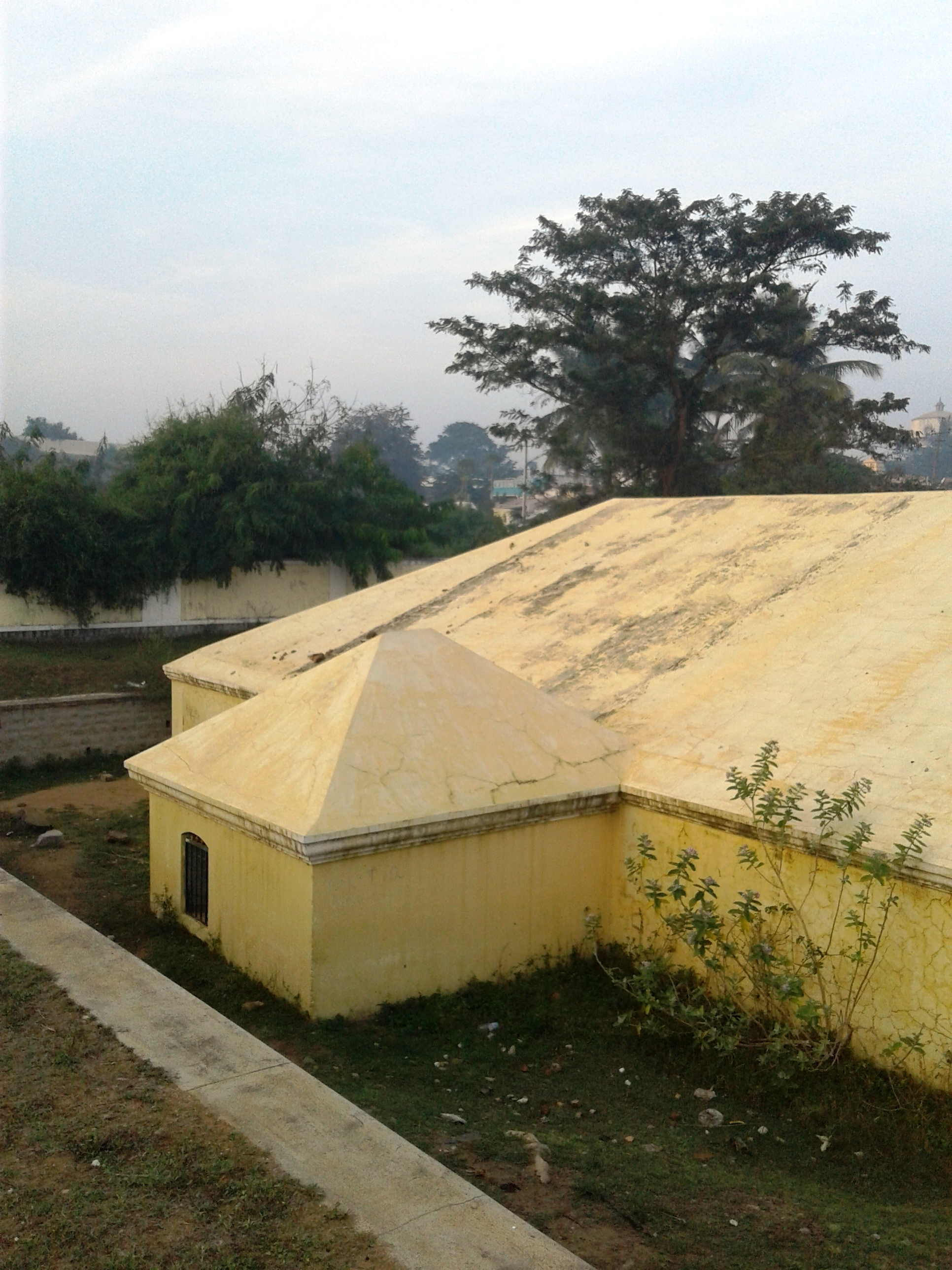
Armory

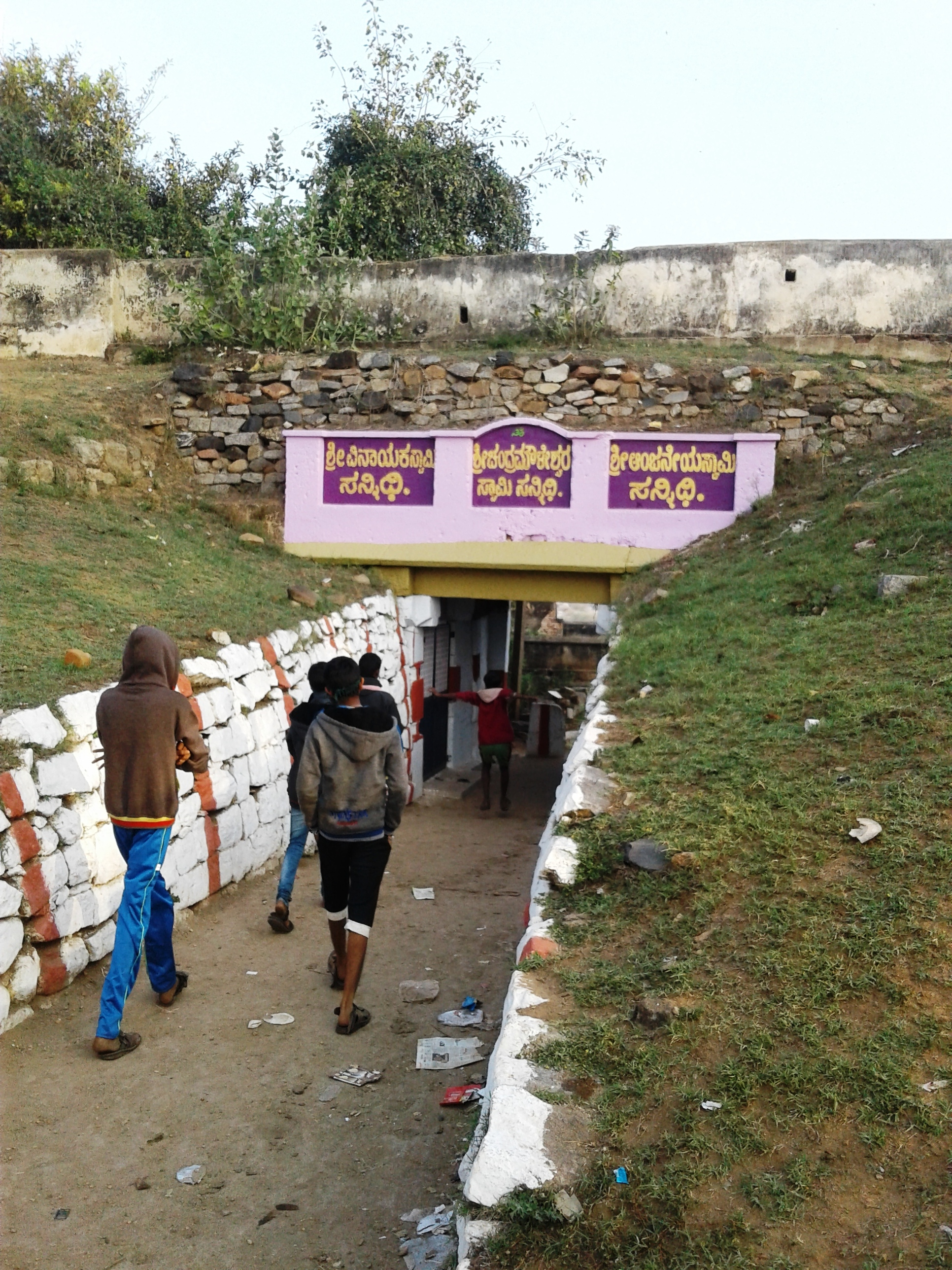
Bathing Ghat

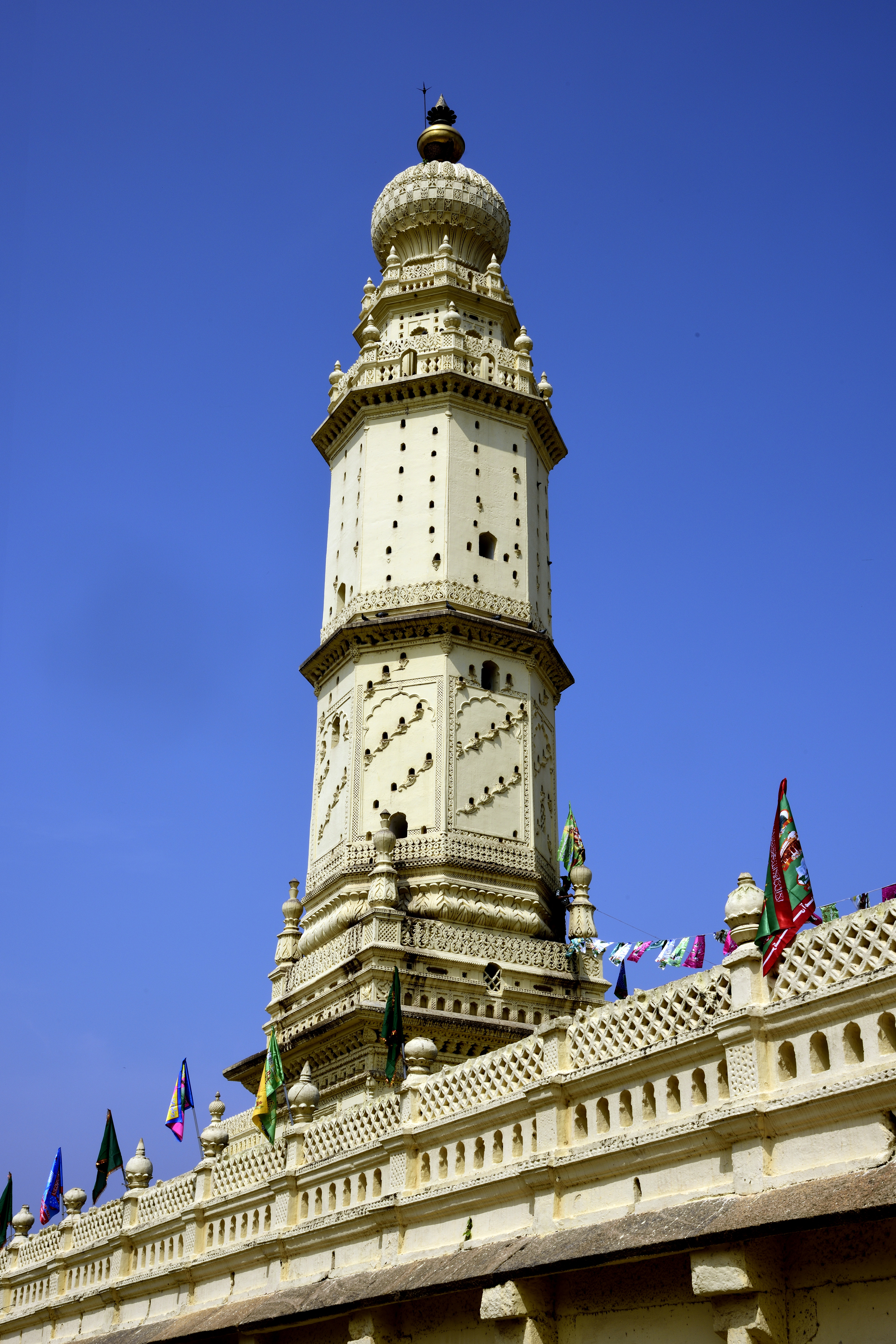
A Minaret of Jama Masjid (Masjid-i-Ala) against deep Blue coloured sky
