= Arthur Cole-Hamilton =

Anglo-Irish politician (1750–1810)

Hon. Arthur Cole-Hamilton (born Cole; 8 August 1750 – 1810) was an Anglo-Irish politician who sat in the Irish House of Commons for County Fermanagh and Enniskillen. After the Acts of Union 1800, he sat in the British House of Commons for Enniskillen.

Cole-Hamilton was the second son of John Cole, 1st Baron Mountflorence (1709–1767) of Florencecourt, County Fermanagh, and his wife, Elizabeth Montgomery. His elder brother was William Cole, 1st Earl of Enniskillen.

In 1780, he married Letitia Hamilton, daughter and heiress of Claud Hamilton, MP in the Irish Parliament, and appended her surname. They had one surviving son and three daughters:

- Claud William Cole-Hamilton (1781–1822), High Sheriff of Tyrone in 1811, married Nichola Sophia Chaloner
- Letitia Cole-Hamilton (5 January 1782 – 1853), married Major Randall Stafford
- Elizabeth Ann Cole-Hamilton (October 1785 – 1849), married Henry Slade
- Isabella Cole-Hamilton (October 1788 – 1827)

Through his son Claud he was an ancestor of the clergyman Richard Cole-Hamilton, the RAF officer John Cole-Hamilton and the politician Alex Cole-Hamilton.

Parliament of Ireland
Preceded by James Stewart; Arthur Brooke	Member of Parliament for County Fermanagh; 1783–1790; With: Mervyn Archdall	Succeeded by Mervyn Archdall; Viscount Cole
Preceded by James Stewart; John McClintock	Member of Parliament for Enniskillen; 1790–1800; With: Richard Magenis	Succeeded by Parliament of the United Kingdom
Parliament of the United Kingdom
Preceded by Constituency established	Member of Parliament for Enniskillen; 1801–1802	Succeeded by John Beresford
Honorary titles
Preceded by Edward Barton	High Sheriff of Fermanagh; 1778	Succeeded by Lord Belmore
Preceded by Samuel Galbraith	High Sheriff of Tyrone; 1792	Succeeded by Charles Crawford
