= Robert Wynne (Irish politician) =

Member of the Irish Parliament (1789–1799)

Robert Wynne (4 May 1761 – 31 May 1838) was an Irish Member of Parliament. He sat in the House of Commons of Ireland from 1789 to 1799, as one of the two MPs for Sligo.

Parliament of Ireland
Preceded by Thomas Dawson; Owen Wynne I	Member of Parliament for Sligo; 1789–1799; With: Thomas Dawson to May 1790; John Cole, Viscount Cole 1790; Owen Wynne II 1790–98; John Cole, Viscount Cole 1798; Owen Wynne II from 1798	Succeeded by Owen Wynne II; William Wynne
