= Arthur Henry Cole =

Anglo-Irish politician (1780–1844)

Arthur Henry Cole (28 June 1780 – 16 June 1844) was an Anglo-Irish politician and civil servant who sat in the British House of Commons for Enniskillen from 1828 to 1844.

Cole was the fourth son of William Cole, 1st Earl of Enniskillen (died 1803), and Anne, daughter of Galbraith Lowry-Corry, Irish MP for County Tyrone and sister of Armar Lowry-Corry, 1st Earl Belmore. He was the younger brother of John Cole, 2nd Earl of Enniskillen, Sir Galbraith Lowry Cole, and Rev. William Cole. He was educated at Trinity College Dublin.

Cole arrived in British India in 1802 as part of the East India Company, and was described by Lord Cornwallis as "a very fine lad, and modest, and well behaved". He was appointed the British Resident in Mysore in 1812, serving for about 15 years before returning home to start his political career. Cole's Park and Cole's Road in Fraser Town, Bangalore are named after him. He was also influential in the construction of an Anglican church, St. Bartholomew's Church, in Mysore.

He was elected as Member of Parliament for the Conservative Party in an 1828 by-election, following the resignation of his brother-in-law Richard Magenis. He resigned from Parliament on 4 June 1844 because of ill health, and died 12 days later at his residence in Manchester Square, Marylebone, just shy of his 64th birthday. He was succeeded by his nephew Henry Arthur Cole.

Parliament of the United Kingdom
Preceded by Richard Magenis	Member of Parliament for Enniskillen; 1828–1844	Succeeded by Henry Cole
