= John Cole, 1st Baron Mountflorence =

Irish peer and politician

The Right Honourable The Lord Mountflorence
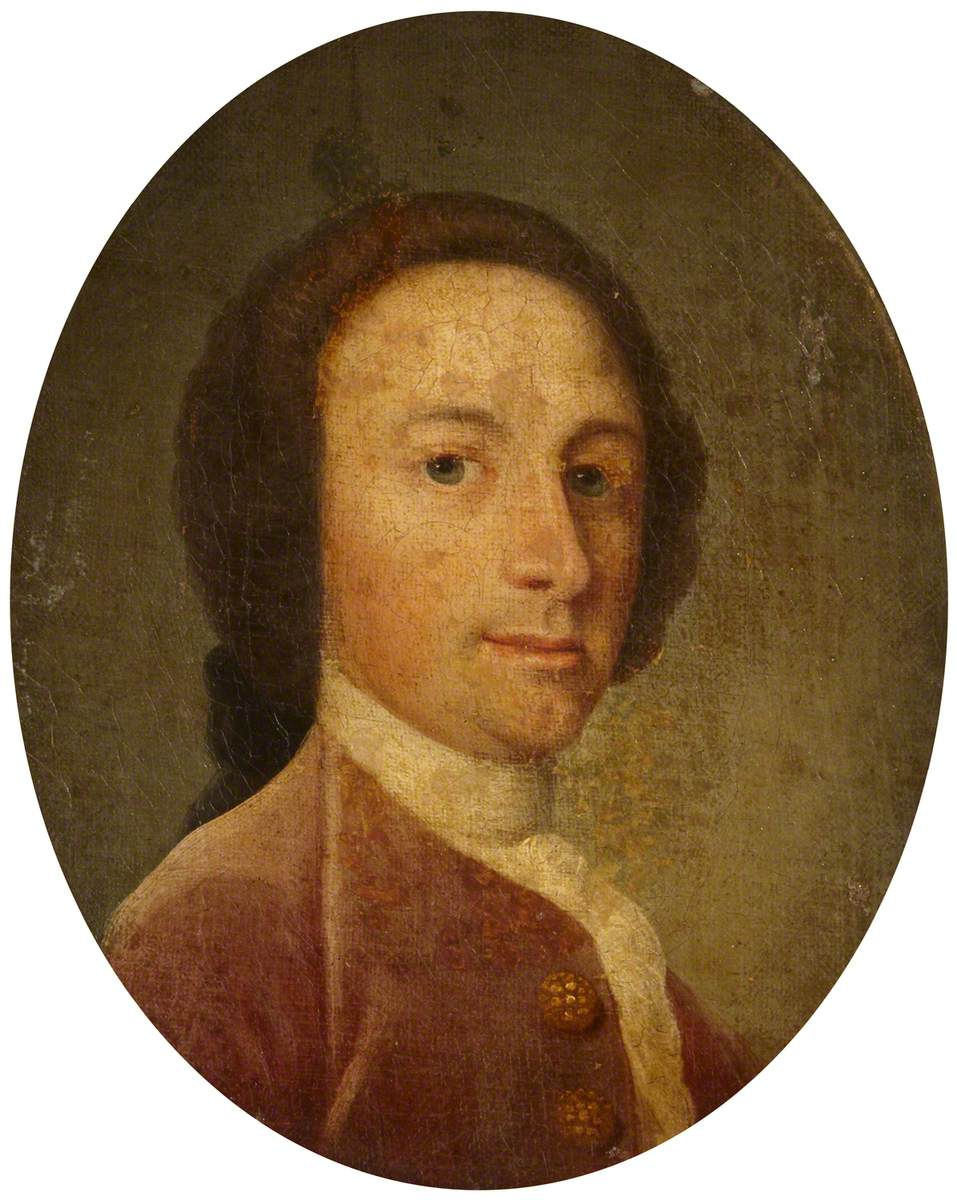

Member of the Irish Parliament for Enniskillen
- In office 1730–1760
- Succeeded by: William Willoughby Cole

Personal details
- Born: 13 October 1709 Dublin, Ireland
- Died: 30 November 1767 (aged 58)
- Children: William Cole, 1st Earl of Enniskillen
- Parent: John Cole (father)
- Education: Trinity College Dublin

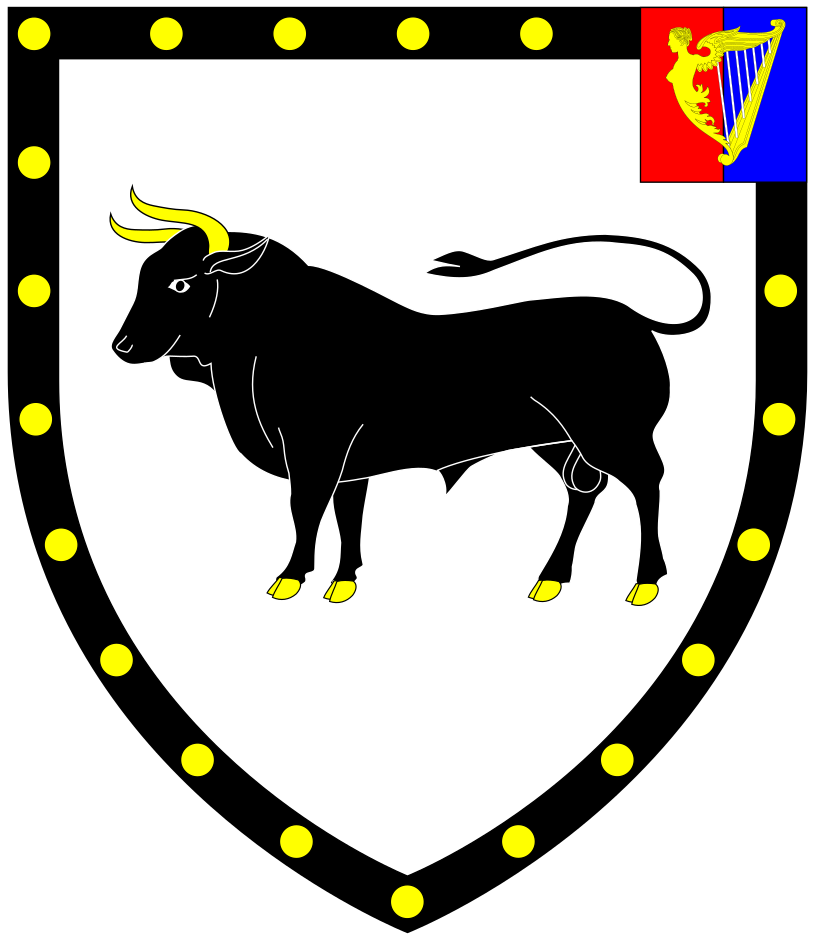
Arms of Cole, Earl of Enniskillen: Argent, a bull passant sable armed or a bordure of the second bezantée on a canton sinister per pale gules and azure a harp of the third stringed argent. These are the arms of Cole of Nethway in the parish of Brixham, Devon, differenced by a canton

John Cole, 1st Baron Mountflorence (13 October 1709 – 30 November 1767) was an Irish peer and politician.

== Biography ==
Born in Dublin, he was the son of John Cole, Member of Parliament for Enniskillen. In 1726 he was admitted to Trinity College Dublin, and four years later returned to the Irish House of Commons as member for his father's old seat of Enniskillen, a constituency he represented until his ennoblement. He was also High Sheriff of Fermanagh in 1733. In 1760 Cole was raised to the Peerage of Ireland as Baron Mountflorence, of Florence Court in the County of Fermanagh. He took his seat in the Irish House of Lords the following year, and died six years later aged 58. He was succeeded in the barony by his son William Willoughby Cole, who was created Earl of Enniskillen in 1789.

Parliament of Ireland
| Preceded by James Saunderson; Richard Cole | Member of Parliament for Enniskillen; 1730–1760; With: James Saunderson | Succeeded by Hon. William Willoughby Cole; Richard Gorges |
Peerage of Ireland
| New creation | Baron Mountflorence; 1760–1767 | Succeeded by William Willoughby Cole |
