= Earl of Enniskillen =

Title in the peerage of Ireland

Earldom of Enniskillen
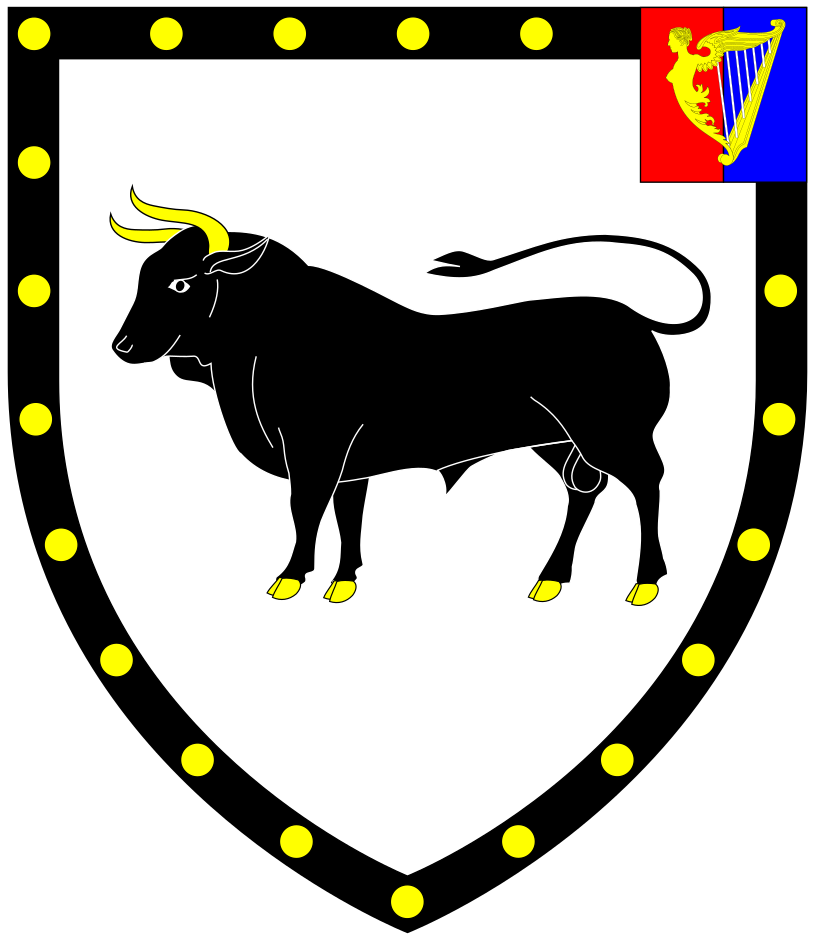
- Arms: Argent, a Bull passant Sable, armed and unguled Gules, within a Bordure Sable, charged with eight Bezants, on a sinister Canton per pale Gules, and Azure, a Harp Or, stringed Argent. Crest: A Demi-Dragon wings inverted Vert, langued Gules, holding in the dexter claw an Escutcheon per pale Gules and Azure, charged with a Harp Or, stringed Argent. Supporters: On either side a Dragon reguardant Vert, holding in the interior forepaw a Dart Or..
- Creation date: 18 August 1789
- Created by: George III
- Peerage: Peerage of Ireland
- First holder: William Cole, 1st Viscount Eniskillen
- Present holder: Andrew Cole, 7th Earl of Enniskillen
- Heir presumptive: Berkeley Arthur Cole
- Remainder to: The 1st Earl’s heirs male of the body lawfully begotten
- Subsidiary titles: Viscount Enniskillen; Baron Mountflorence; Baron Grinstead
- Status: Extant
- Former seat: Florence Court
- Motto: DEUM COLE REGEM SERVA (Worship God, honour the King)
- These are the arms of Cole of Nethway in the parish of Brixham, Devon, differenced by a canton

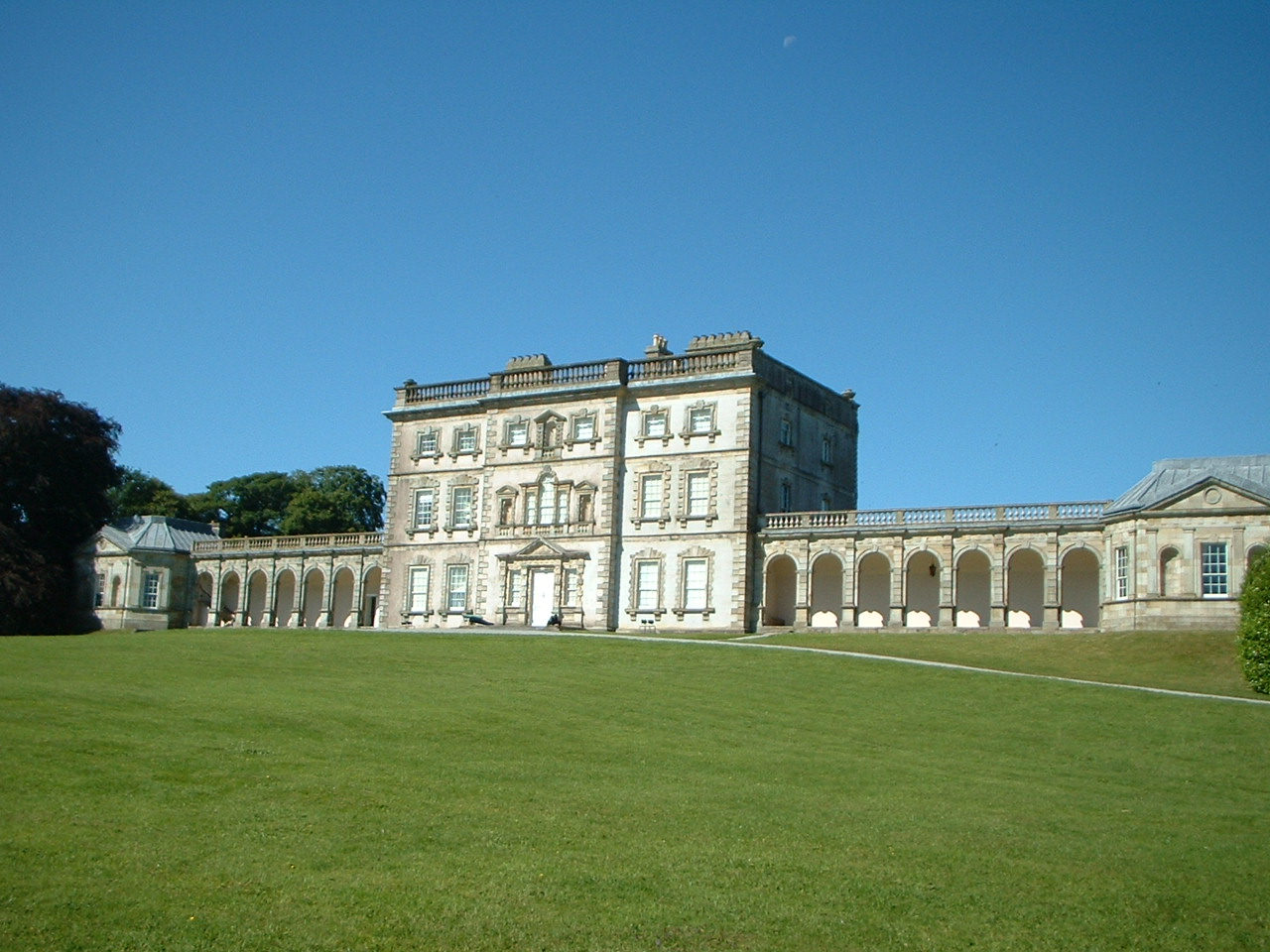
Florence Court

Earl of Enniskillen is a title in the Peerage of Ireland. It was created in 1789 for William Cole, 1st Viscount Enniskillen. He had already been created Viscount Enniskillen in the Peerage of Ireland in 1776 and had inherited the title Baron Mountflorence, of Florence Court in the County of Fermanagh, which had been created in the Peerage of Ireland in 1760 for his father John Cole, who had earlier represented Enniskillen in the Irish House of Commons. The family are descended from the Ulster planter, Sir William Cole.

Lord Enniskillen was succeeded by his son, the second earl. He represented County Fermanagh in the British House of Commons, served as Lord Lieutenant of County Fermanagh and sat as an Irish representative peer in the House of Lords at Westminster between 1804 and 1840. In 1815 he was created Baron Grinstead, of Grinstead in the County of Wiltshire, in the Peerage of the United Kingdom, which gave him and the later earls an automatic seat in the House of Lords.

His son, the third earl, was a palaeontologist and also sat as Conservative Member of Parliament for Fermanagh. He was succeeded by his son, the fourth earl, who represented Enniskillen in Parliament as a Conservative. His son, the fifth earl, was Lord Lieutenant of Fermanagh.

== The title since 1963 ==
=== 6th Earl ===
The 5th Earl was succeeded by his nephew, Captain David Lowry Cole, M.B.E., M.L.C., who became the 6th Earl; he was the son of The Hon. Galbraith Lowry Egerton Cole, third son of the 4th Earl, and his wife Lady Eleanor Cole.

David was also a nephew of The Hon. Berkeley Cole and a nephew-in-law to The 3rd Baron Delamere, as well as being a first-cousin of The 4th Baron Delamere. The Cholmondeley family, Barons Delamere, owned (and, in 2012, still own) the vast Soysambu Ranch in Kenya. David Enniskillen (as he was usually known to his family and friends) had been born and raised in the Colony of Kenya.

He attended Eton and Trinity College, Cambridge, and then served with the Irish Guards during the Second World War, rising to the British Army rank of Captain. Following the war, the young Capt. D.L. Cole returned to Kenya, serving as a Provisional Commandant in the Kenya Police Reserve (the K.P.R.), 1953–55. He was appointed a M.B.E. for his services to the British Crown during the Mau Mau Uprising.

Capt. D.L. Cole became very involved in colonial politics in Kenya in the late 1950s, serving as a Member of the Legislative Council (M.L.C.) in the final Legislative Council of Kenya, 1961–1963. He also took part in the conferences at Lancaster House leading up to Kenya's independence, which was achieved within the Commonwealth in December 1963. On 19 February 1963, while still serving as an M.L.C., a few months before Kenyan independence, Capt. Cole succeeded as The 6th Earl of Enniskillen. Shortly after succeeding to the Peerage, the new Lord Enniskillen returned to Northern Ireland. He and his American second wife, Nancy, a former junior diplomat with the United States Foreign Service, lived at Florence Court (newly restored by the National Trust) in southwest County Fermanagh from 1963 to 1972, when they relocated to Kinloch House, Amulree in Scotland.

David Enniskillen served as a captain in the Ulster Defence Regiment (the U.D.R.), 1971–1973, during the very early years of The Troubles in Northern Ireland. He also served as Deputy Lieutenant of County Fermanagh, 1963–78. He lived at Kinloch House until his death in 1989, when he was buried in the grounds of Killesher Parish Church, the Church of Ireland neo-Gothic family church near the village of Florencecourt in south-west County Fermanagh. Nancy, Dowager Countess of Enniskillen (née Nancy MacLennan), formerly of Bridgeport, Connecticut, was also buried at Killesher Parish Church in 1998.

=== 7th Earl ===
The 6th Lord Enniskillen had only two children, both by his first wife, Sonia Mary Syers, whom he married on 31 July 1940. They were divorced early in 1955. The two children were Andrew Cole (born 28 April 1942) and Linda Mar Cole (born 26 March 1944). From 1963 to 1989, Andrew held the courtesy title Viscount Cole.

Since the death of his father in 1989, Andrew has been The 7th Earl of Enniskillen (usually known to his family and friends as Andrew Enniskillen). The 7th Lord Enniskillen lives on his 40,000 acre estate near Lake Naivasha in the former 'White Highlands' in southern Kenya.

Since February 1963, Linda was known as Lady Linda Mar Cole. She married Richard Muir (possibly 'Sir' Richard), the presumed 4th Bt., in August 1975. Thus she was also known as Lady Linda Muir. She died in 2023.

=== Florence Court ===
The ancestral seat, certainly from the late 1750s, of the Cole family was Florence Court in south-west County Fermanagh. The house has been in the care of the National Trust since 1953.

The last Earl to live in the country house was David, 6th Earl of Enniskillen (1918–1989), who left in 1972.

Michael Cole, ancestor of the Earls of Enniskillen, was the brother of Sir John Cole, 1st Baronet (see Baron Ranelagh).

== Barons Mountflorence (1760) ==
- John Cole, 1st Baron Mountflorence (1709–1767)
- William Willoughby Cole, 2nd Baron Mountflorence (1736–1803) (created Earl of Enniskillen in 1789)

== Earls of Enniskillen (1789) ==
- William Willoughby Cole, 1st Earl of Enniskillen (1736–1803)
- John Willoughby Cole, 2nd Earl of Enniskillen (1768–1840)
- William Willoughby Cole, 3rd Earl of Enniskillen (1807–1886), who was succeeded by his second but eldest surviving son
- Lowry Egerton Cole, 4th Earl of Enniskillen (1845–1924), who was succeeded by his second but eldest surviving son
- John Henry Michael Cole, 5th Earl of Enniskillen (1876–1963), who married, firstly, to Irene Frances Mundy, by whom he had issue, and secondly to Mary Cicely Syers (née Nevill; died 1963) whose daughter Sonia Mary Cole married his nephew and heir presumptive in 1940. The 5th Earl gave Florence Court to the National Trust in 1953.
- Michael Galbraith Lowry Cole, Viscount Cole (1921–1956), died unmarried, aged 35.
- David Lowry Cole, 6th Earl of Enniskillen (1918–1989), formerly Captain David Lowry Cole, M.B.E., had spent much of his life in the Colony of Kenya, having been elected a member of the Legislative Council of Kenya in the early 1960s, just before independence. In 1955, he was divorced from his first wife Sonia (née Syers), stepdaughter of his uncle the 5th Earl, and daughter of Lady Enniskillen by her first marriage. By her, he had issue one son and one daughter. On 7 May 1955, he married secondly Nancy Henderson MacLennan. She was Washington, D.C. and U.N. correspondent for The New York Times. Then she was an assistant attaché and Vice-Consul with the U.S. Foreign Service.
- Andrew John Galbraith Cole, 7th Earl of Enniskillen (born 1942), only son of the 6th Earl and his first wife, Sonia Syers. He is married, with three daughters. Andrew Enniskillen lives on a vast estate in Kenya.

The heir presumptive is the present holder's first cousin Berkeley Arthur Cole (born 1949). He is the eldest son of The Hon. Arthur Gerald Cole (1920–2005), younger brother of the 6th Earl. Berkeley Arthur Cole is married to Hon Cecilia Ridley, 1st daughter of Matthew White Ridley, 4th Viscount Ridley, by his wife Lady Anne Katherine Gabrielle Lumley, 3rd daughter of Roger Lumley, 11th Earl of Scarbrough, and has issue, two sons. He also has two younger brothers.

== See also ==
- Baron Ranelagh
