= Hail to the Chief =

Personal anthem of the president of the United States

- Personal anthem of the President of the United States
- Lyrics: Albert Gamse
- Music: James Sanderson, 1812
- Published: May 8, 1812
- Adopted: 1829 (de facto); 1954 (de jure)

Audio sample
- Four ruffles and flourishes followed by "Hail to the Chief" (as would be played for the U.S. president), played by the U.S. Navy Band's ceremonial band: file; help

"Hail to the Chief" is a piece of music best known as the personal anthem of the president of the United States. Its original purpose was to announce arrival by boat at an island in a Scottish loch, which was adapted by James Sanderson from an original Scottish Gaelic melody.

The song's playing accompanies the appearance of the president of the United States at many public events; it is also played at inauguration ceremonies, playing at the arrival of the incumbent president (outgoing or newly re-elected, as the case may be), and immediately after the president takes his oath of office. For a time, it was also played at the end of the ceremonies with the departure of the president. For major official occasions, the United States Marine Band and other military ensembles are generally the performers, so directives of the United States Department of Defense have, since 1954, been the main basis for according it official status. It is preceded by four ruffles and flourishes when played for the president. The song is also played during a former President's state funeral after the casket is removed from the hearse. Its age puts the song into the public domain.

== History ==
Verses from Walter Scott's 1810 narrative poem The Lady of the Lake were set to music around 1812 by James Sanderson (c. 1769 – c. 1841), a self-taught English violinist and the conductor of the Surrey Theatre, London. Sanderson also wrote many songs for local theatrical productions during the 1790s and the early years of the 19th century. The lyrics open:

Hail to the Chief who in triumph advances!
Honored and blessed be the ever-green Pine!

— The Lady of the Lake, 1810

In November 1810, Scott wrote to a friend that The Lady of the Lake was being made into a play by Martin and Reynolds in London and by a Mr. Siddons in Edinburgh. About the same time, he received a letter from a friend and army officer who ended his note with a copy of the music of the Boat Song "Hail to the Chief".

A version of Lady of the Lake debuted in New York on May 8, 1812, and "Hail to the Chief" was published in Philadelphia about the same time as "March and Chorus in the Dramatic Romance of the 'Lady of the Lake'". Many parodies appeared, an indication of great popularity.

Four "ruffles and flourishes" before "Hail to the Chief"
"Hail to the Chief" preceded by four "ruffles and flourishes" the official fanfare for the president of the United States, performed by the United States Army Band's Herald Trumpets

The music was first associated with the President in 1815, when it was played under the name "Wreaths for the Chieftain" to honor both George Washington and the end of the War of 1812. On July 4, 1828, the U.S. Marine Band performed the song at a ceremony for the formal opening of the Chesapeake and Ohio Canal, which was attended by President John Quincy Adams. Andrew Jackson was the first living President to have the song used to honor his position in 1829, and it was played at Martin Van Buren's inauguration in 1837. Julia Tyler, second wife of President John Tyler, requested its use to announce the arrival of the President.

First lady Sarah Childress Polk encouraged its regular use in to introduce the President after it was used at President James Polk's inauguration. William Seale says, "Polk was not an impressive figure, so some announcement was necessary to avoid the embarrassment of his entering a crowded room unnoticed. At large affairs the band ... rolled the drums as they played the march ... and a way was cleared for the President."

During the American Civil War (1861–1865), the piece was also used to announce the arrival of Confederate President Jefferson Davis.

President Chester A. Arthur did not like the song and asked John Philip Sousa to compose a new song entitled "Presidential Polonaise". After Arthur left office, the Marine Band resumed playing "Hail to the Chief" for public appearances by the President.

In 1954, the Department of Defense made it the official tribute to the President.

Gerald Ford did not use the song during his administration, preferring to be introduced with "The Victors", the fight song of his alma mater University of Michigan.

President Jimmy Carter banned the playing of the song for a brief time during his tenure. The decision proved to be extremely unpopular among the American public, however, and Carter later reversed himself.

== Lyrics ==
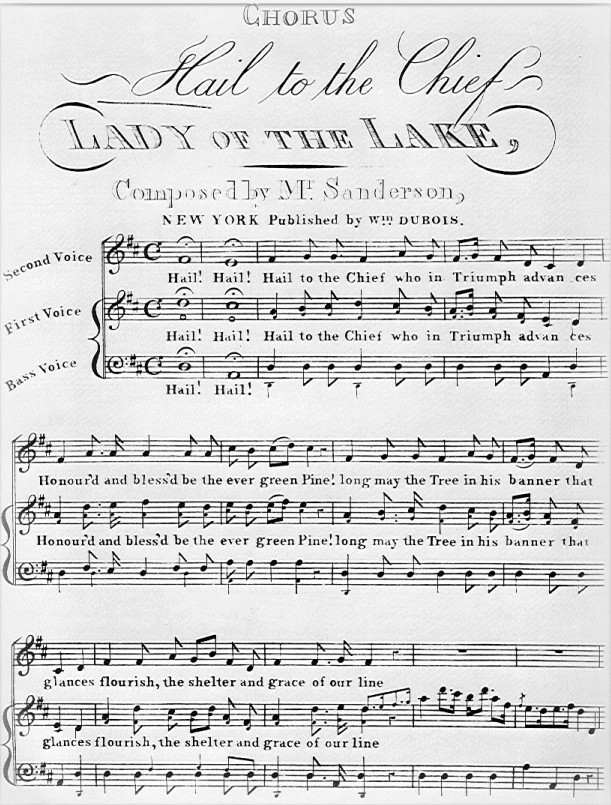
Sheet music for the song whose tune became the presidential fanfare, with the melody, on the middle staff, carried by "First Voice"

Albert Gamse wrote lyrics set to James Sanderson's music, but they are rarely sung:

Hail to the Chief we have chosen for the nation,
Hail to the Chief! We salute you, one and all.
Hail to the Chief, as we pledge cooperation,
In proud fulfillment of a great, noble call.

Yours is the aim to make this grand country grander,
This you will do, that is our strong, firm belief.
Hail to the one we selected as commander,
Hail to the President! Hail to the Chief!

Sir Walter Scott wrote lyrics for "Boat Song" in Canto Second of his poem "The Lady of the Lake":

Hail to the chief, who in triumph advances,
Honour'd and blessed be the evergreen pine!
Long may the tree in his banner that glances,
Flourish the shelter and grace of our line.
Heaven send it happy dew,
Earth lend it sap anew,
Gaily to bourgeon and broadly to grow;
While every Highland glen,
Sends our shout back again
"Roderigh Vich Alpine Dhu, ho! i-e-roe!"

Ours is no sapling, chance-sown by the fountain,
Blooming at Beltane, in winter to fade;
When the whirlwind has stript every leaf on the mountain,
The more shall Clan Alpine exult in her shade.
Moor'd in the lifted rock,
Proof to the tempest's shock,
Firmer he roots him, the ruder it blow:
Menteith and Breadalbane, then,
Echo his praise agen,
"Roderigh Vich Alpine Dhu, ho! i-e-roe!"

Proudly our pibroch has thrill'd in Glen Fruin,
And Blanochar's groans to our slogan replied,
Glen Luss and Ross Dhu, they are smoking in ruin,
And the best of Loch Lomond lie dead on our side.
Widow and Saxon maid,
Long shall lament our raid,
Think of Clan Alpine with fear and with woe.
Lenox and Levon Glen,
Shake when they hear agen
"Roderigh Vich Alpine Dhu, ho! i-e-roe!"

Row, vassals, row for the pride of the Highlands!
Stretch to your oars for the evergreen pine!
O, that the rosebud that graces yon islands,
Were wreath'd in a garland around him to twine.
O, that some seedling gem,
Worthy such noble stem,
Honour'd and blest in their shadow might grow;
Loud should Clan Alpine then,
Ring from her deepmost glen,
"Roderigh Vich Alpine Dhu, ho! i-e-roe!"

== See also ==
- "Hail, America"
- United States military music customs
- Ave Maria (Schubert)
- Leitmotif

== Known cultural references ==
- In the film My Fellow Americans, two ex-Presidents played by Jack Lemmon and James Garner discuss their annoyance at hearing the song played wherever they would go. Humorously, they both admit they made up their own lyrics in their head ("Hail to the chief, he's the chief and he needs hailing, he is the chief so everybody hail like crazy." or "Hail to the Chief if you don't I'll have to kill you, I am the chief so you had better watch your step, you bastards")
- In the film Dave, the main character sings a variation including the lyrics, "Hail to the Chief/He's the one we all say hail to./We all say Hail/'Cause he keeps himself so clean./He's got the power/That's why he's in the shower."
- "Hail to the Chief" is referenced in the lyrics of the song "Fortunate Son," written by John Fogerty and performed by Creedence Clearwater Revival.
- University of Michigan, Ann Arbor alumnus Gerald Ford, the 38th President of the United States, often had the Naval band play the U of M fight song, "The Victors," prior to state events instead of "Hail to the Chief." He also selected the song to be played during his funeral procession, which took place December 2006 at the U.S. Capitol.
- "Jail to the Chief" was a slogan first seen on buttons and bumper stickers during the Watergate scandal of President Richard Nixon.
- The piece features in The Simpsons Movie (2007).
- The song is featured in the film Amistad (1997).
- The Dixie Chicks came onstage to the strains of "Hail to the Chief" during their "Accidents and Accusations" Tour which opened in Detroit, Michigan on July 21, 2006
- Hail to the Thief, a play on "Hail to the Chief", is an album by English band Radiohead, and the phrase is contained in the lyrics of "2 + 2 = 5", a song on the album.
- "Hail to the Thief" was also a slogan which appeared on numerous signs on the 2001 inaugural parade route for George W. Bush.
- When President John F. Kennedy was asked what his favorite song was, he replied "Hail to the Chief." The song is normally given a spirited rendering as with any march tune. During Kennedy's funeral procession on November 25, 1963, a much slower rendition was included among the funeral dirge music.
- A shortened version of "Hail to the Chief" is played at funerals of former Presidents when their coffin arrives at a venue.
- A mid-1980s Purity Dairies commercial starring Ernest P. Worrell was aired in conjunction with the 1984 presidential election and featured Ernest talking about how his own special interest group—"Purity lovers"—have nominated him for president. At the end, while he is dialing the White House on a red telephone, he sings a modified "Hail to the Chief"—"Hail to the chief, he's your buddy and your neighbor."
- In "Heave Ho Thomas!", the sixth episode of the twelfth season of Thomas and Friends, "Hail to the Chief" is used as the theme song for the character Hank the American Engine.
- Rapper Bun B samples Hail to the Chief in his song "The Inauguration" on his album Trill.
- Stephen Sondheim and John Weidman's musical Assassins makes frequent motivic use of the theme throughout the score.
- Was used as entrance music for WWF wrestler Bob Backlund
- In the movie MASH the camp staff sang a variation of the song to the character Trapper John McIntyre upon his appointment as chief surgeon. "Hail to the Chief, he's the best of all the surgeons, he needs a queen to satisfy his urgin's. Hail to the Chief, he's the best of all the trappers, he needs a queen to sit upon his 'lappers.' Hail to the Chief, he's the best of all the cutters, he needs a queen with a bigger pair of udders. Hail to the Chief, the Colonel did elect him, he took his orders and shoved them up his rectum."
