= Sligo (Parliament of Ireland constituency) =

Pre-1801 Irish constituency

- Former borough constituency for the Irish House of Commons
- County: County Sligo
- Borough: Sligo

–1801
- Replaced by: Sligo (UKHC)

Sligo was a constituency represented in the Irish House of Commons until 1800.

== Members of Parliament ==
- 1613–1615 Henry Andrews and Edward Southworth
- 1634–1635 Arthur Jones and Edward Southworth
- 1639–1645 Keane O'Hara and Thomas Radcliffe (expelled)
- 1661–1666 Sir Henry Tichborne and Samuel Bathurst

=== 1689–1801 ===
Election	First MP	Second MP
1689	Terence MacDonogh	James French
1692	Percy Gethin	Theophilus Jones
1695	Percy Gethin	Roger Smith
1703	Percy Gethin	Samuel Walton
1713	Samuel Burton	Owen Wynne
1727	Francis Ormsby	Owen Wynne
1751	John Wynne	Owen Wynne
1757	John Wynne	William Ormsby
1761	John Folliott	William Ormsby
1762	Robert Scott	William Ormsby
1768	John Wynne	William Ormsby
1776	Owen Wynne	Richard Hely-Hutchinson
October 1783	Owen Wynne	John Foster
1783	Owen Wynne	Thomas Dawson
1789	Robert Wynne	Thomas Dawson
May 1790	Robert Wynne	John Cole, Viscount Cole
1790	Robert Wynne	Owen Wynne
January 1798	Robert Wynne	John Cole, Viscount Cole
1798	Robert Wynne	Owen Wynne
1799	William Wynne	Owen Wynne
1801	Succeeded by Westminster constituency Sligo	
