= Andrew Cole, 7th Earl of Enniskillen =

Andrew John Gilbraith Cole, 7th Earl of Enniskillen (born 28 April 1942) is a British peer and landowner in Kenya. He was styled Viscount Cole from 1963 to 1989, after which he was a member of the House of Lords until 1999, although he rarely attended.

He is a former managing director of Kenya Airways.

== Early life ==
The only son of David Lowry Cole, 6th Earl of Enniskillen and his wife Sonia Mary Syers, Enniskillen was born in England in 1942 while his father, who had been born in Kenya and mostly lived there, was serving in the British army during the Second World War. He was educated at Eton College, and then on 6 May 1961 was commissioned into the Irish Guards, in which he spent five years, rising to the rank of Captain.

== Career ==
On his return to Kenya, Cole joined Kenya Airways. He became a Kenyan citizen in 1972 and was the company's managing director between 1979 and 1981.

On 30 May 1989, he succeeded as Earl of Enniskillen (an Irish peerage created in 1789), and also as Viscount Enniskillen (1776), Baron Mountflorence (1760), and Baron Grinstead (1815). The last of these is in the peerage of the United Kingdom and gave him a seat as of right in the House of Lords until November 1999. He also inherited extensive estates in Kenya.

== Personal life ==
On 3 October 1964, Viscount Cole, as he then was, married Sarah Frances Caroline Edwards, a daughter of Major-General John Keith Edwards, and they have three daughters, all born in Kenya:

- Lady Amanda Mary Cole (born 1966)
- Lady Emma Frances Cole (born 1969)
- Lady Lucy Caroline Cole (born 1970).

In 2022, Enniskillen was living in the south of Laikipia County, where he has a large estate.

The heir presumptive to the peerages is Enniskillen's cousin Berkeley Arthur Cole (born 1949), the eldest son of Arthur Gerald Cole, a younger brother of the 6th Earl. Berkeley Arthur Cole is married to Cecilia Ridley, a daughter of Matthew White Ridley, 4th Viscount Ridley, and they have two sons.

== Publication ==
- Andrew Enniskillen, The Cole Legacy (Barnes & Noble, 2022)

== Notes ==
Peerage of Ireland
Preceded by David Lowry Cole	Earl of Enniskillen; 1989–present	Succeeded by Incumbent
