= William Wynne (Irish politician) =

Member of the Irish Parliament (1799–1800)

William Wynne (c. 1764 – 1855) was an Irish politician.

He sat in the House of Commons of Ireland from 1799 to 1800, as a Member of Parliament for Sligo.

Parliament of Ireland
Preceded by Owen Wynne; Robert Wynne	Member of Parliament for Sligo; 1799–1800; With: Owen Wynne	Parliament of Ireland abolished See Sligo Westminster constituency
