= Masjid-i-Ala =

Mosque in Mandya, Karnataka, India

Masjid-i-Ala; (Juma Masjid)
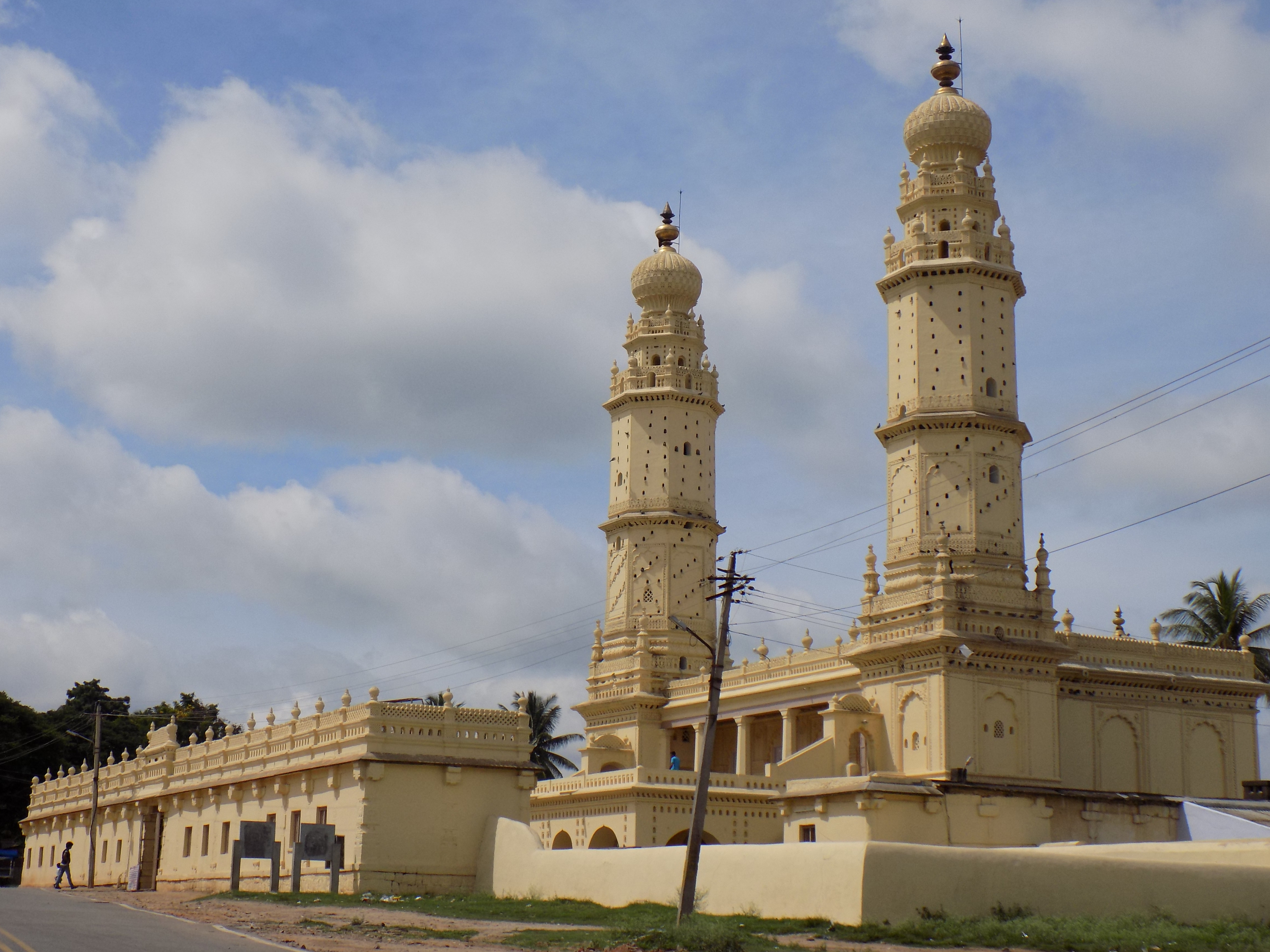
- A panoramic view of the mosque, in 2016

- Location of the mosque in Karnataka

Religion
- Affiliation: Islam
- Ecclesiastical or organizational status: Congregational mosque
- Status: Active

Location
- Location: Srirangapatna Fort, Srirangapatna, Mandya, Karnataka
- Country: India
- Interactive map of: Masjid-i-Ala; (Juma Masjid)
- Administration: Archaeological Survey of India
- Coordinates: 12°24′50″N 76°42′14″E

Architecture
- Type: Mosque architecture
- Style: Indo-Islamic
- Completed: c. 1787
- Minaret: Two
- Inscriptions: Three

Monument of National Importance
- Official name: Masjid-i-Ala
- Part of: Srirangapatna Fort
- Reference no.: N-KA-B149

The Masjid-i-Ala, also called the Jama Masjid or Jama Mosque, is a Friday mosque, located inside the Srirangapatna Fort in Srirangapatna in Mandya District in Karnataka. It was built in 1786–87, during the rule of Tipu Sultan.

The structure is a Monument of National Importance, maintained and administered by the Archaeological Survey of India.

== History ==
The Srirangapatna Fort is believed to have been built in 1454 CE by Timmanna Nayaka, a ruler of Vijayanagar Empire. The fort was taken up by Wodeyars in 1495, Nawab of Arcot, Peshwas and subsequently by the Marathas. During the rule of Krishnaraja Wodeyar (1734–66), the kingdom became a strong military force and came under the control of the military general Hyder Ali, the father of Tipu Sultan. During 1782, Tipu Sultan, the son of Hyder Ali, took the reign of the fort and built fortifications. Tipu was invaded many times by the British forces.

Tipu Sultan built the mosque close to his palace during 1786-87. The mosque has three inscriptions that mention the nine names of Muhammad, an Islamic prophet. The inscriptions also mention that Tipu Sultan was the builder of the mosque. The mosque has a madrasa and a cloister for rooms.

=== Wars ===
After several unsuccessful attempts, British forces under the command of Colonel Wellesly, made an attack on 4 May 1799 under the covers. The forces had 2,494 British officers and 1 lakh Maratha cavalry and Nizams soldiers totaling to a force of more than 2 and half lakh which attached less than 20 thousand soldiers in the fort who defended bravely, had it not been to Mir Sadaq they would have repelled the invaders successfully. The minister mixed dung and water in the gun powder Tipu was killed in the battle and the English had a treaty with the Wodeyar queen.

=== 20th-century controversy ===
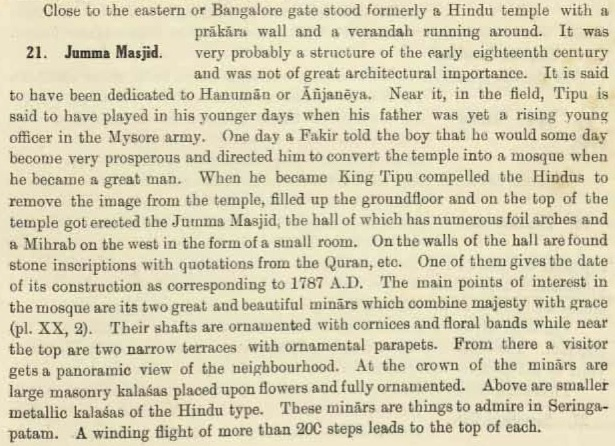
Jamia Mosque Seringapatam controversy

There were demands from Hindu groups that the structure was originally a Hanuman temple. The Hindu groups demanded that Puja, or Hindu Worship of Hamuman, or Anjenya be permitted at the mosque. The Hindu groups claimed that Tipu Sultan had forcibly removed the Hindu deities and converted it into a mosque. The Hindu groups pointed to the 1935 Annual Report of the Mysore Archeological Department, published by the Mysore Government as evidence to back their claims. Further, they claimed that the motifs on the granite pillars had Hindu deities and Hindu iconography, and an emblem of the Hoysala empire was evident. According to the 1935 report, a Muslim fakir had made a young Tippu promise him that the temple would be converted into a mosque after he had taken power over Mysore, and on assuming power Tippu had made good his promise.

Inscriptions on the mosque written in Persian, state, however that Tipu as the builder of the mosque.

== Architecture ==
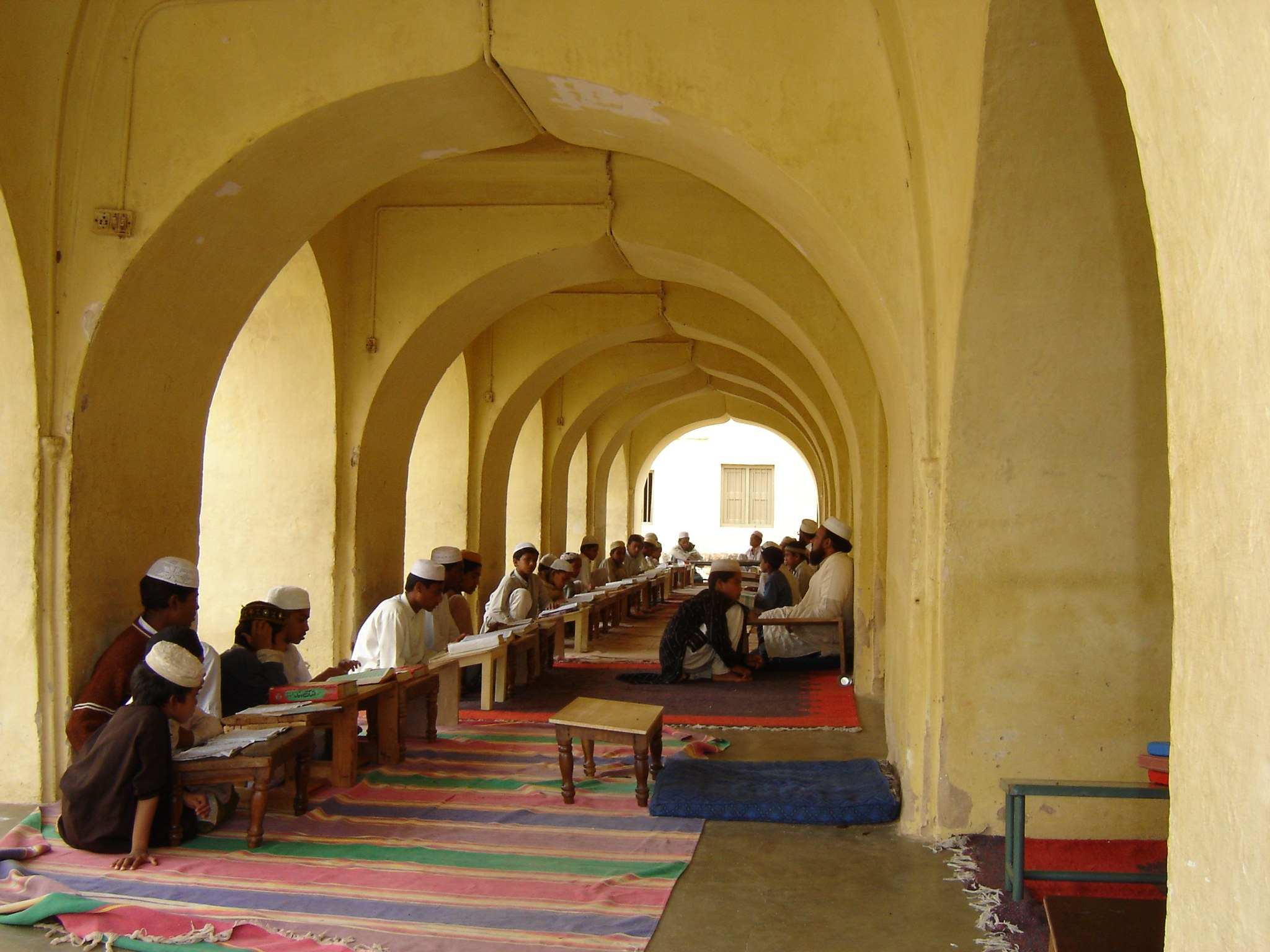
Madrasa inside the mosque

The mosque is located close to the Bangalore Gate and has two minarets. The mosque is built over an elevated platform. The mosque has three inscriptions that mention the nine names of Muhammad. The minarets are separated by three octagonal stages. There are galleried balconies that separate each stage of the minaret. There are turnip-shaped domes on the top of the minarets. There is a large rectangular prayer hall inside the mosque with a flat roof supported by foiled arches. There is a series of arched openings in the minarets as well as the walls of the rectangular terrace. The mosque has two stories and, unlike other mosques, it does not have a dome. There is an old clock installed during the early 20th century. A Madrasa is operated from the mosque, where learning of Islam is imparted. In modern times, the mosque is maintained and administered by the Bangalore Circle of Archaeological Survey of India.

== See also ==
- Islam in India
- List of mosques in India
- List of Monuments of National Importance in Bijapur district, Karnataka
