= Sonia Mary Cole =

British anthropologist (1918–1982)

- Born: Sonia Mary Syers; 1919; Westminster, London, England
- Died: 1982 (aged 62–63)
- Scientific career
- Fields: Anthropology, archaeology, geology
- Workplaces: British Museum

Sonia Mary Cole (née Syers) (1918 – 1982) was an English geologist, archaeologist, anthropologist and author.

== Biography ==
Sonia Cole was born Sonya Syers in Westminster, London, her mother marrying the 5th Earl of Enniskillen as her second husband, and Sonia herself marrying his nephew, the 6th Earl. Cole worked for the British Museum, and conducted extensive fieldwork in Africa. She was a close friend and colleague of Mary Leakey, who wrote her obituary.

David Lowry Cole, 6th Earl of Enniskillen (1918–1989) was divorced from his first wife Sonia in 1955. By her, he had issue one son and one daughter.

Cole is most remembered for her work Races of Man, which drew heavily from Carleton Coon.

== Works ==
- An Outline of the Geology of Kenya (1950)
- The Prehistory of East Africa (1954, 2nd ed. 1958, rev. ed. 1964)
- Races of Man (1963, 2nd ed. 1965)
- The Neolithic Age (1970)
- Leakey's Luck (1975)
