= John Cole, 2nd Earl of Enniskillen =

Irish politician (1768–1840)

The Right Honourable The Earl of Enniskillen KP
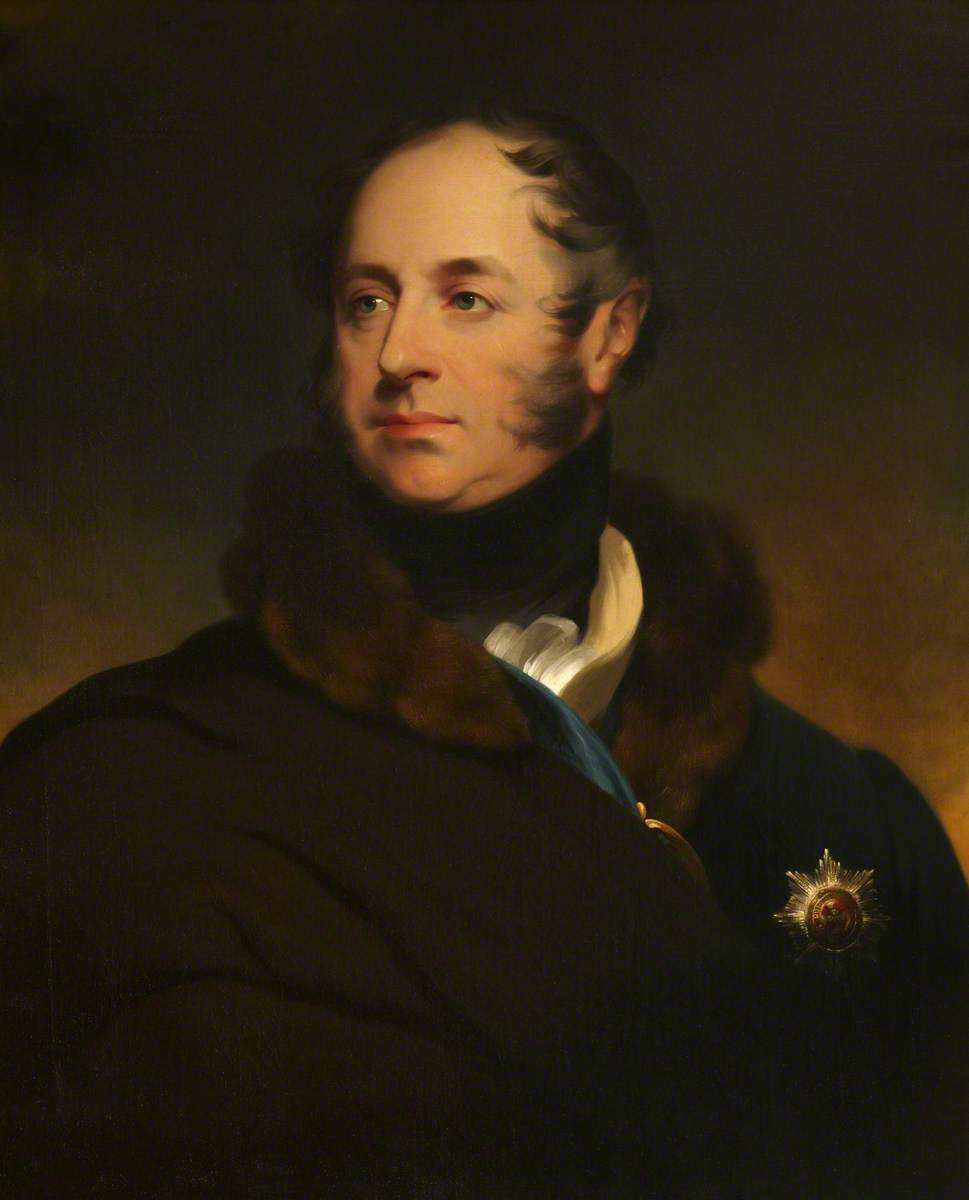
- Portrait by William Robinson, c. 1820–1839
- Born: The Hon. John Willoughby Cole; 23 March 1768
- Died: 13 April 1840 (aged 72)
- Spouse: Lady Charlotte Paget
- Parents: William Cole, 1st Earl of Enniskillen (father); Anne Lowry-Corry (mother)

Member of the House of Lords Lord Temporal
- In office 1815–1840; Hereditary peerage
- Succeeded by: William Cole
- In office 1804–1840; Representative peer for Ireland

John Willoughby Cole, 2nd Earl of Enniskillen KP (23 March 1768 – 31 March 1840), styled Viscount Cole from 1789 to 1803, was an Irish politician.

== Biography ==
Cole was the son of William Cole, 1st Earl of Enniskillen. He succeeded his father to the peerage and the Florence Court estate in 1803.

In 1790 and in 1798, he was elected for Sligo and County Fermanagh. Both times, he chose to sit for the latter and represented the constituency in the Irish House of Commons until the Act of Union in 1801. After the Union, Cole was subsequently returned to the British House of Commons for County Fermanagh, a seat he held until he succeeded his father to the earldom in 1803. He then sat in the House of Lords as an Irish representative peer from 1804 to 1840.

He was also Governor of Fermanagh until 1831 and thereafter Lord Lieutenant of the county until his death. He was made a Knight of the Order of St Patrick in 1810 and in 1815 created Baron Grinstead, of Grinstead in the County of Wiltshire, in the Peerage of the United Kingdom.

== Personal life ==
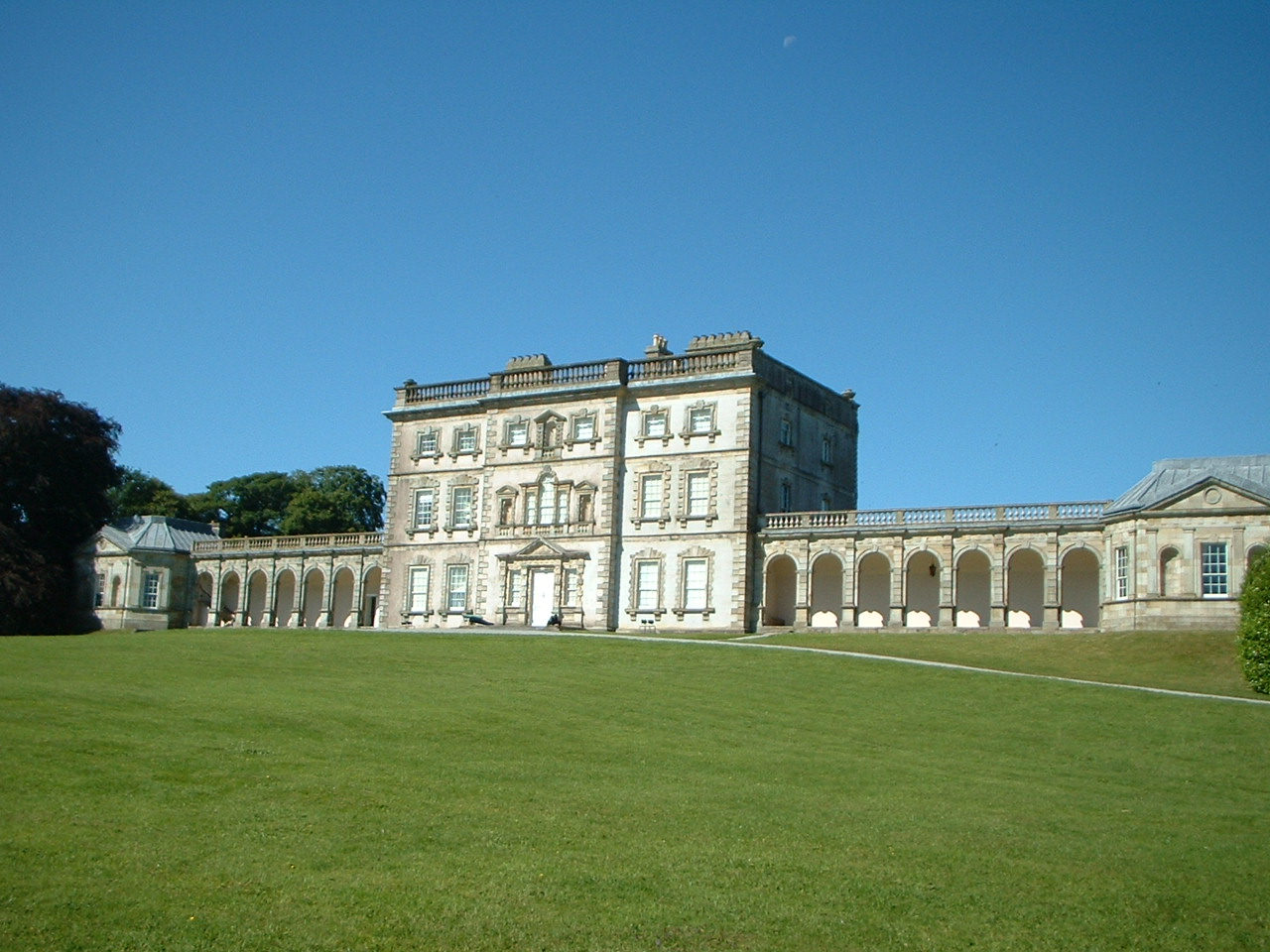
Florence Court, County Fermanagh, the family seat

Lord Enniskillen married Lady Charlotte Paget, daughter of Henry Paget, 1st Earl of Uxbridge, in 1805. They had five children:

- William Willoughby Cole, 3rd Earl of Enniskillen (25 January 1807 – 12 November 1886)
- Colonel The Hon. Henry Arthur Cole (14 February 1809 – 2 July 1890)
- Lady Jane Anne Louisa Florence Cole (27 July 1811 – 23 March 1831)
- The Hon. John Lowry Cole (8 June 1813 – 28 November 1882)
- The Hon. Lowry Balfour Cole (6 June 1815 – 14 January 1818)

He died in March 1840, aged 72, and was succeeded in his titles by his eldest son William.

Parliament of Ireland
Preceded by Mervyn Archdall; Arthur Cole-Hamilton	Member of Parliament for County Fermanagh; 1790–1801; With: Mervyn Archdall	Succeeded by Parliament of the United Kingdom
Preceded by Robert Wynne; Thomas Dawson	Member of Parliament for Sligo; 1790; With: Robert Wynne	Succeeded by Robert Wynne; Owen Wynne
Preceded by Robert Wynne; Owen Wynne	Member of Parliament for Sligo; 1798; With: Robert Wynne	Succeeded by Robert Wynne; Owen Wynne
Parliament of the United Kingdom
New constituency	Member of Parliament for County Fermanagh; 1801–1803; With: Mervyn Archdall 1801–1802; Mervyn Archdall 1802–1803	Succeeded by Mervyn Archdall; Galbraith Lowry Cole
Political offices
Preceded by The Earl of Leitrim	Representative peer for Ireland; 1804–1840	Succeeded by The Earl of Lucan
Honorary titles
New title	Lord Lieutenant of Fermanagh; 1831–1840	Succeeded by The Earl Erne
Peerage of Ireland
Preceded by William Willoughby Cole	Earl of Enniskillen; 1803–1840	Succeeded by William Willoughby Cole
Peerage of the United Kingdom
New creation	Baron Grinstead; 1815–1840	Succeeded by William Willoughby Cole
