= William Cole, 1st Earl of Enniskillen =

Irish peer & politician (1736–1803)

The Right Honourable The Earl of Enniskillen
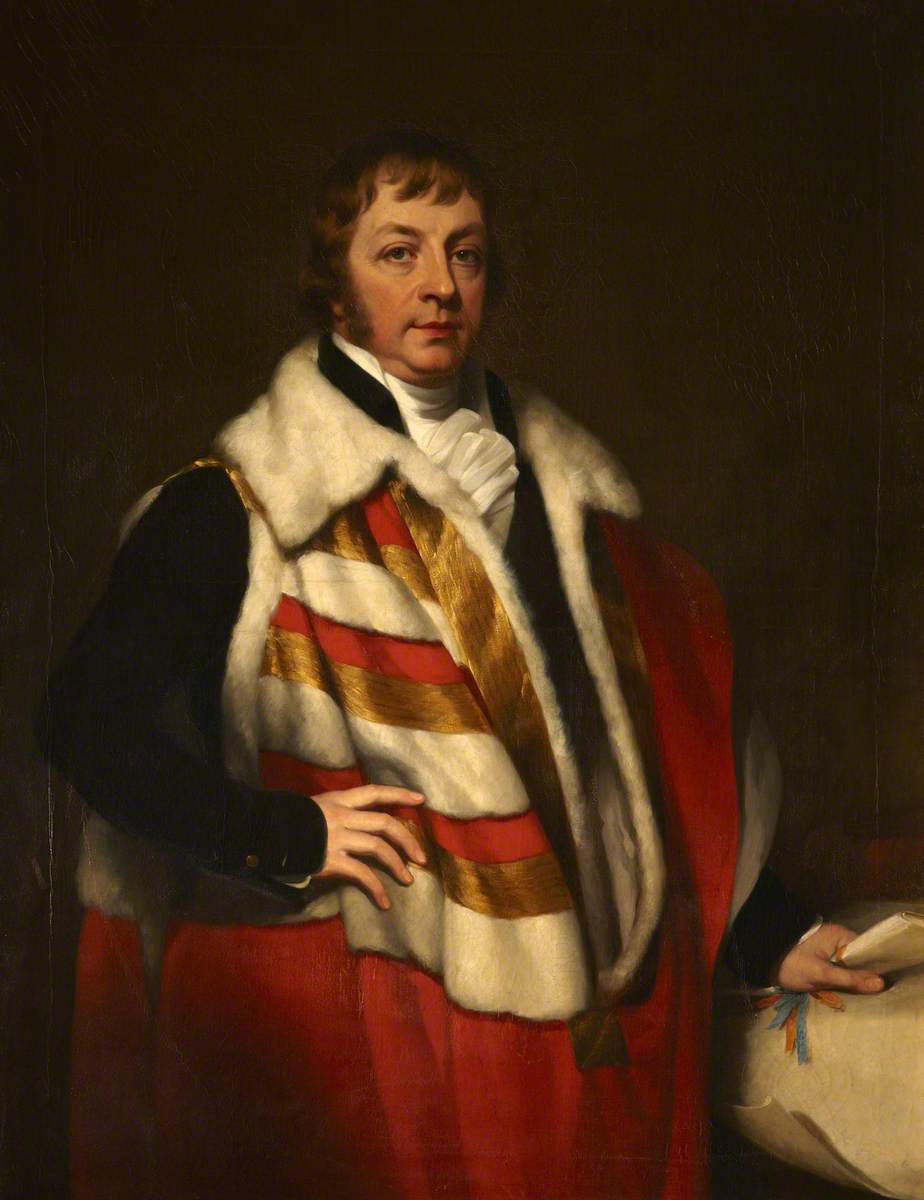

Member of the Irish Parliament for Enniskillen
- In office 1761–1767

Personal details
- Born: William Willoughby Cole; 1 March 1736
- Died: 22 May 1803 (aged 67)
- Spouse: Anne Lowry-Corry
- Children: John Cole, 2nd Earl of Enniskillen; Galbraith Lowry Cole; William Cole; Arthur Henry Cole; Lady Sarah Wynne; Lady Elizabeth Anne Magenis; Lady Florence Townley-Balfour; Henrietta Frances de Grey, Countess de Grey
- Parent: John Cole, 1st Baron Mountflorence (father)

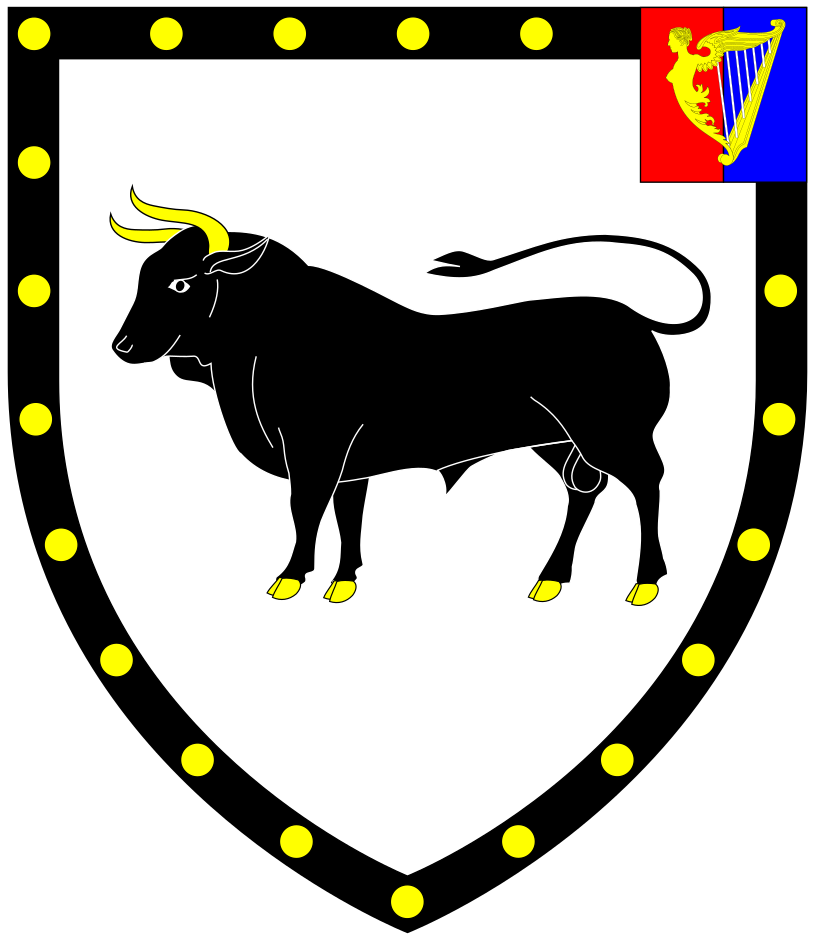
Arms of Cole, Earl of Enniskillen: Argent, a bull passant sable armed or a bordure of the second bezantée on a canton sinister per pale gules and azure a harp of the third stringed argent. These are the arms of Cole of Nethway in the parish of Brixham, Devon, differenced by a canton

William Willoughby Cole, 1st Earl of Enniskillen (1 March 1736 – 22 May 1803), styled The Honourable from 1760 to 1767, then known as the Lord Mountflorence to 1776 and as the Viscount Enniskillen to 1789, was an Irish peer and politician.

Enniskillen was the eldest son of John Cole, 1st Baron Mountflorence of Florence Court, County Fermanagh.

Cole represented Enniskillen in the Irish House of Commons from 1761 to 1767, when he succeeded his father as 2nd Baron Mountflorence and took his seat in the Irish House of Lords. In 1776, he was created Viscount Enniskillen and in 1789 he was even further honoured when he was made Earl of Enniskillen. Both these titles are in the Peerage of Ireland.

== Private life ==
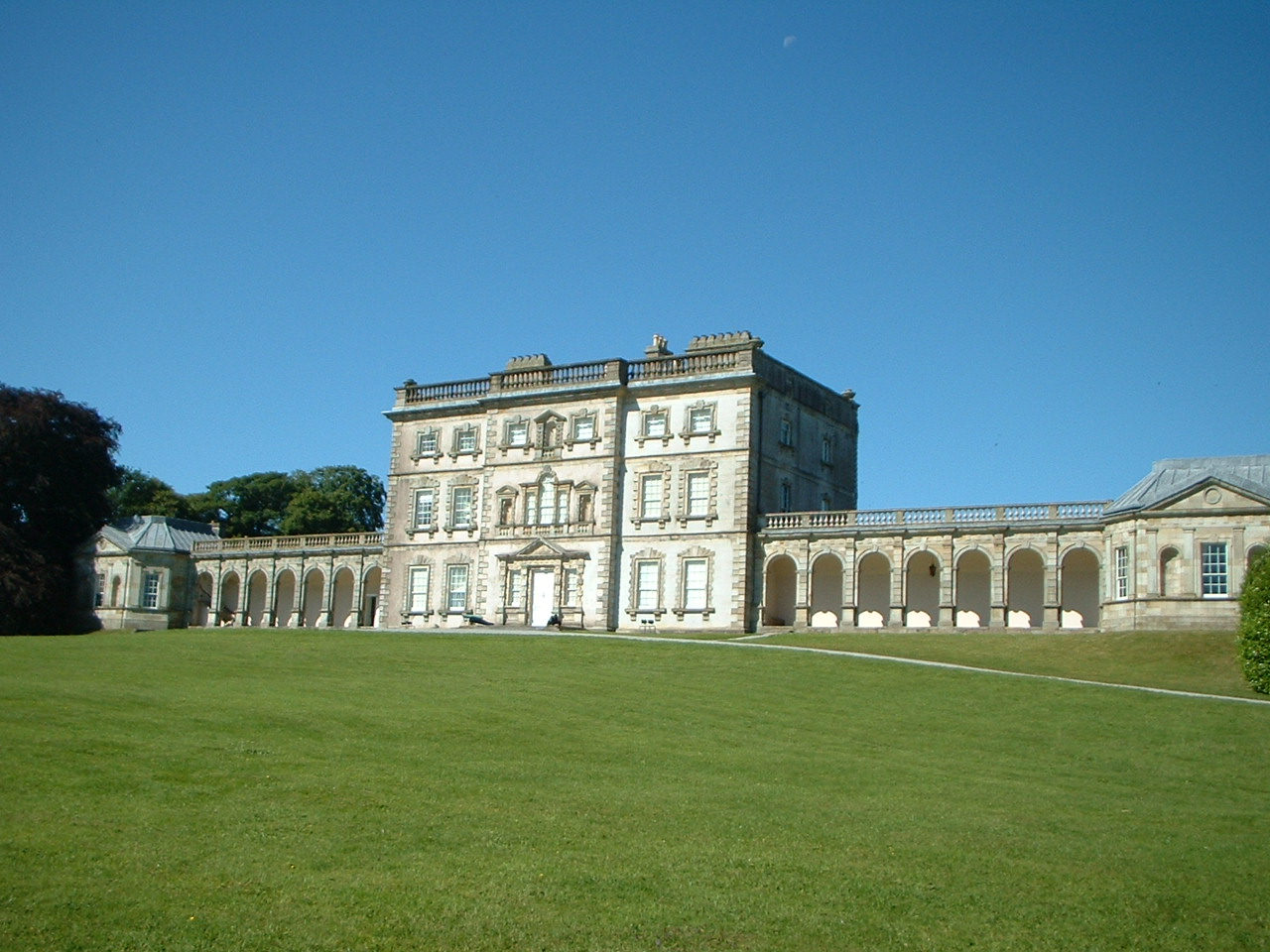
Florence Court, County Fermanagh

In November 1763 Enniskillen married Anne, daughter of Galbraith Lowry-Corry, Member of the Irish Parliament for County Tyrone and sister of Armar Lowry-Corry, 1st Earl Belmore. They had four sons and four daughters:

- John Willoughby Cole, 2nd Earl of Enniskillen (23 March 1768 – 31 March 1840)
- General The Hon. Sir Galbraith Lowry Cole (1 May 1772 – 4 October 1842)
- The Hon. Rev. William Montgomery Cole (d. October 1804), Dean of Waterford
- The Hon. Arthur Henry Cole (28 June 1780 – 16 June 1844)
- Lady Sarah Cole (d. 14 March 1833), married Owen Wynne in 1790
- Lady Elizabeth Anne Cole (d. 1807), married Lieutenant-Colonel Richard Magenis in 1788
- Lady Florence Cole (d. 1 March 1862), married Blayney Townley-Balfour in 1797
- Lady Henrietta Frances Cole (22 June 1784 – 2 July 1848), married Thomas de Grey, 2nd Earl de Grey on 20 July 1805

Lord Enniskillen died in May 1803, aged 67, and was succeeded in his titles by his eldest son.

Parliament of Ireland
Preceded by James Saunderson; John Cole	Member of Parliament for Enniskillen; 1761–1767; With: Richard Gorges	Succeeded by Richard Gorges; Richard Gorges
Peerage of Ireland
New creation	Earl of Enniskillen; 1789–1803	Succeeded by John Willoughby Cole
New creation	Viscount Enniskillen; 1776–1803	Succeeded by John Willoughby Cole
Preceded by John Cole	Baron Mountflorence; 1767–1803	Succeeded by John Willoughby Cole
