= Owen Wynne (1755–1841) =

Irish landowner and politician

Owen Wynne (1755 – 12 December 1841) was an Irish landowner and politician.

He was the son of Owen Wynne (1723–1789) of Hazelwood, an MP of the Parliament of Ireland, and his wife the Hon. Anne Maxwell. He succeeded to his father's estates in 1789, inheriting Hazelwood House, Sligo.

He was elected a Member of the Irish Parliament for Sligo for 1776–1790 and 1791–1800. After the Act of Union he sat as MP for Sligo in the UK Parliament from 1801 to 1806, resigning his seat by taking the notional crown office of profit as Escheator of Munster. He returned many years later as MP for Sligo in 1820–1830. He was appointed custos rotulorum for County Sligo for life in 1789 and High Sheriff of Sligo for 1819–20 and High Sheriff of Leitrim for 1833–34.

He died in 1841. He had married Lady Sarah Elizabeth Cole, the daughter of William Cole, 1st Earl of Enniskillen; they had two sons and four daughters. His son John Arthur Wynne (1801–1865) inherited Hazelwood, and served as MP for Sligo, and his daughter Sarah married Edward Joshua Cooper of Markree Castle.

Parliament of Ireland
Preceded by John Cole; Robert Wynne	Member of Parliament for Sligo; 1790–1798; With: Robert Wynne	Succeeded by Robert Wynne; John Cole
Preceded by Robert Wynne; John Cole	Member of Parliament for Sligo; 1798–1800; With: Robert Wynne; William Wynne	Succeeded by Parliament of the United Kingdom
Parliament of the United Kingdom
Preceded by Parliament of Ireland	Member of Parliament for Sligo; 1801–1806	Succeeded by George Canning
Preceded by John Bent	Member of Parliament for Sligo; 1820–1830	Succeeded by John Arthur Wynne
