= Thomas Dawson (politician) =

Thomas Dawson was an Irish politician who served in the Parliament of Ireland during the late 18th century. He was educated at Trinity College Dublin.

Dawson represented County Armagh from 1783 to 1790, and Sligo from 1783 to 1790.
