= James Sanderson (musician) =

- Born: 1769; Workington, Great Britain
- Died: c. 1841
- Occupation: Composer
- Notable work: "Hail to the Chief"

James Sanderson (or Saunderson 1769–c.1841) was an English musician, now remembered as a composer. The tune for "Hail to the Chief", the presidential anthem of the United States, is attributed to him, taken from a Scottish Gaelic melody.

== Life ==
Sanderson was born at Workington in Cumberland. He taught himself the violin, and at age 14 was taken on at the Sunderland Theatre. In 1784 he established himself at South Shields as a teacher, and in 1787 became leader at the Newcastle Theatre.

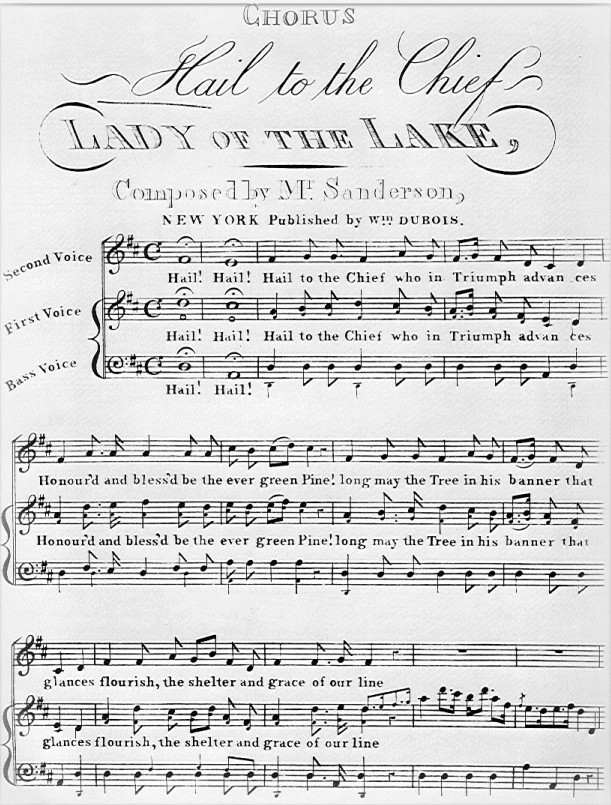
Sheet music for the presidential fanfare composed by James Sanderson.

In 1788 Sanderson went to London and led the orchestra at Astley's Theatre. He was engaged in 1793 by the Royal Circus as composer and musical director; he remained there many years, producing incidental music for dramas, and vocal and instrumental pieces. Sanderson worked closely with John Cartwright Cross, who usually provided words for a long series of burlettas, melodramas and pantomimes. Cross devised a way for the Royal Circus, which became the Surrey Theatre, to get round restrictions on the classic plays they could show: it involved rendering the lines into rhymed couplets, and adding musical accompaniment.

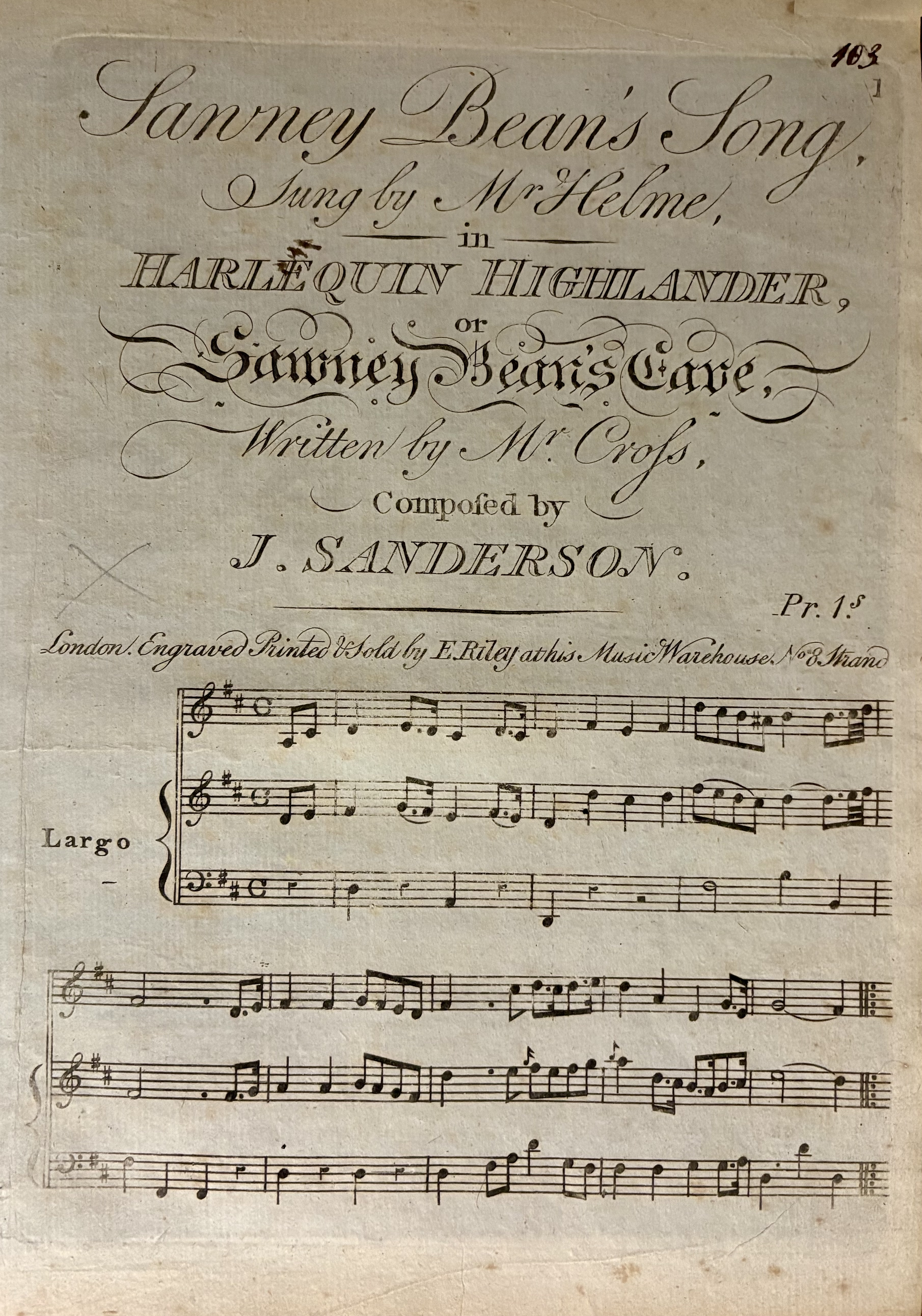
Sawney Bean's Song (1798) composed by James Sanderson about the legendary 16th century Scottish cannibal Sawney Bean

Sanderson died about 1841.

== Works ==
Sanderson began as a composer with instrumental accompaniment to William Collins's Ode on the Passions, which George Frederick Cooke recited at his benefit in Chester. The accepted tune for the Robert Burns poem Comin' Thro' the Rye was composed by him. A ballad, Bound 'Prentice to a Waterman, sung in the drama Sir Francis Drake (1800), was regularly introduced into nautical plays for half a century. Two of Sanderson's ballads were still reprinted in the Musical Bouquet of 1874. He composed Sawney Bean's Song about the legendary 16th century Scottish cannibal Sawney Bean in 1798. It was reviewed in the Monthly Magazine in November 1798 as ″very properly composed in the Scotch style″.
