= William Cole (dean of Waterford) =

The Honourable William Montgomery Cole was an Irish Anglican priest.

Cole was educated at Trinity College Dublin. He was Dean of Waterford from July 1804 until his death in October that year.

He was the third son of William Cole, 1st Earl of Enniskillen.

Church of Ireland titles
Preceded by Christopher Butson	Dean of Waterford; July 1804–October 1804	Succeeded by Ussher Lee
