= Armar Lowry Corry (disambiguation) =

Armar Lowry Corry may refer to:

== People ==
- Armar Lowry Corry, British rear admiral
- Armar Lowry-Corry, 1st Earl Belmore, (7 April 1740 – 2 February 1802), Irish nobleman and politician
- Armar Lowry-Corry, 3rd Earl Belmore, (28 December 1801 – 17 December 1845), Irish nobleman and politician.
- Armar Lowry-Corry, 5th Earl Belmore, 5 May 1870 – 12 February 1948), Irish nobleman and the eldest son of Somerset Lowry-Corry, 4th Earl Belmore
