= Louisa Montagu, Countess of Sandwich =

Irish noblewoman and society figure

The Right Honourable The Countess of Sandwich
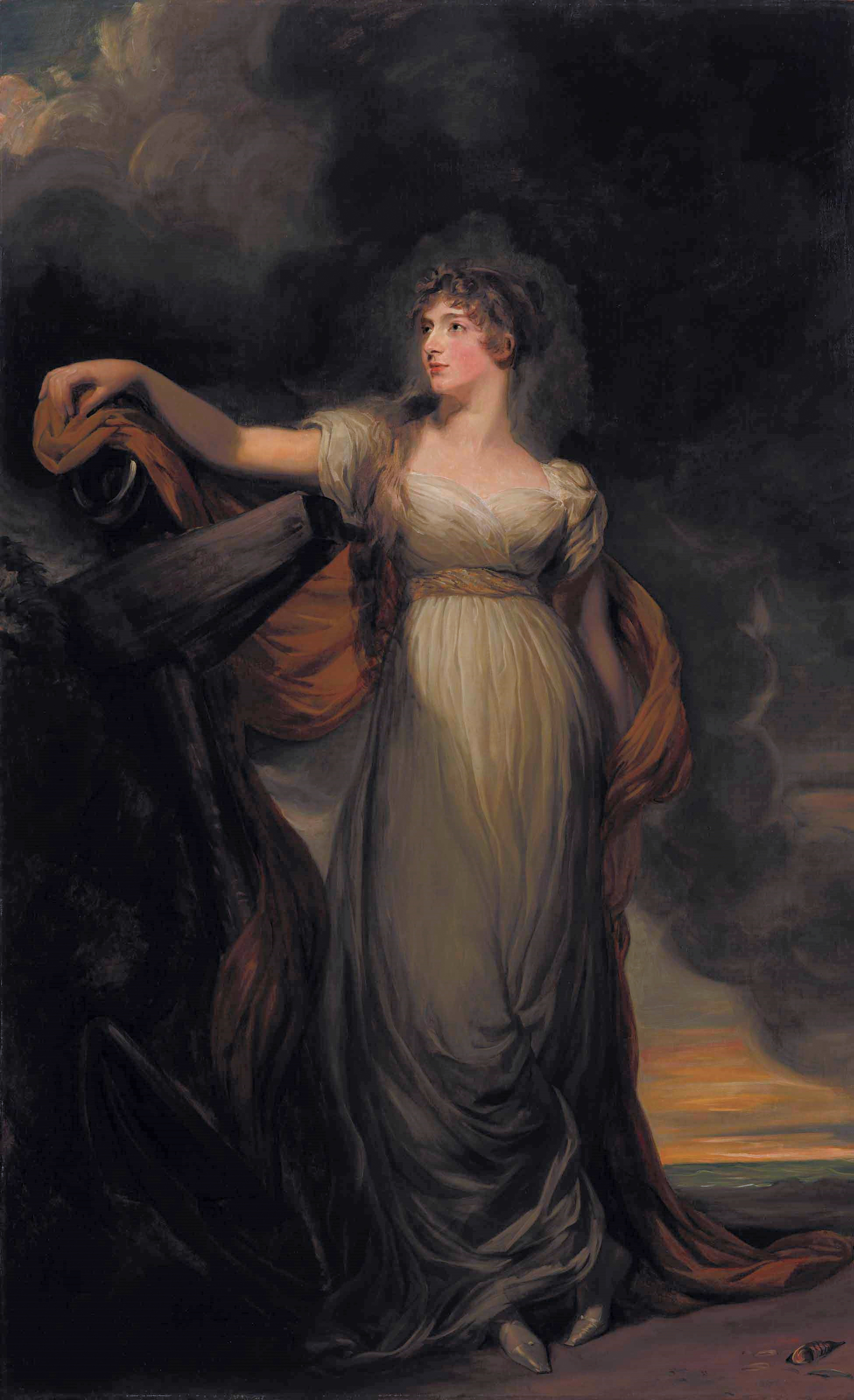
- Lady Louisa Lowry-Corry, Countess of Sandwich - painting by Thomas Lawrence as "Hope"
- Born: Hon. Louisa Mary Anne Julia Harriet Lowry-Corry; 3 April 1781; Ireland
- Died: 19 April 1862 (aged 81)
- Burial place: Barnwell, Northamptonshire, England
- Spouse: George Montagu, 6th Earl of Sandwich (m. 1804; died 1818)
- Children: Harriet Mary Baring, Baroness Ashburton; Lady Catherine Montagu; John Montagu, 7th Earl of Sandwich
- Parent(s): Armar Lowry-Corry, 1st Earl Belmore; Lady Harriet Hobart

Louisa Mary Anne Julia Harriet Montagu, Countess of Sandwich (née Lady Louisa Lowry-Corry; 3 April 1781 – 19 April 1862) was an Irish noblewoman and society figure, who in 1804 became the wife of George Montagu, 6th Earl of Sandwich.

She posed for artists including Sir Thomas Lawrence, and her bust was sculpted by Antonio Canova.

== Family ==
Lady Louisa was born on 3 April 1781 in Ireland, the daughter of Irish peer and politician Armar Lowry-Corry, 1st Earl Belmore, and Lady Harriet Hobart, daughter of John Hobart, 2nd Earl of Buckinghamshire, Lord Lieutenant of Ireland. She had one half brother, Somerset Lowry-Corry, 2nd Earl Belmore by her father's first marriage to Lady Margaret Butler. She most likely spent part of her early years at Castle Coole, County Fermanagh which her father had rebuilt in 1789.

Her parents' marriage was dissolved by an Act of Parliament in 1793, and the following year her mother married William Kerr, 6th Marquess of Lothian, and by him had four additional children. Her father subsequently took Mary Anne Caldwell as his third wife. As a result of her parents' divorce, Louisa was sent to be brought up with one of her relatives, Lady Castlereagh.

== Marriage and issue ==
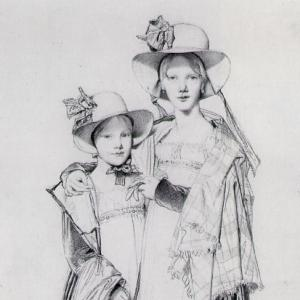
Lady Harriet Mary Montagu and her sister Lady Catherine Caroline Montagu

Lady Louisa married on 9 July 1804, George John Montagu, Viscount Hinchingbrooke, MP for Huntingdonshire. He succeeded as 6th Earl of Sandwich in 1814, and from that time onwards, Louisa was styled the Countess of Sandwich.

Together they had two daughters and one son, who would succeed his father in the earldom:

- Lady Harriet Mary Montagu (14 May 1805 – 4 May 1857), married William Bingham Baring, 2nd Baron Ashburton.
- Lady Catherine Caroline Montagu (7 October 1808 – 30 April 1834), married Count Alexandre Joseph Colonna-Walewski, an illegitimate son of Napoleon I and Marie, Countess Walewski.
- John William Montagu, 7th Earl of Sandwich (8 November 1811 – 3 March 1884), married firstly Lady Mary Paget; married secondly Lady Blanche Egerton.

== Widowhood ==
In 1818, following the death of her husband, who left her with a large jointure, Louisa moved to the Continent, where she spent many years in the former home of Talleyrand in the Rue de St Florentin in Paris. Afterwards, she retired to a mansion in the Rue de Tivoli.

She was compelled to return to England following the Revolutions of 1848 which engulfed France and the rest of continental Europe.

She is referred to in a letter written by Thomas Carlyle to his mother on 3 September 1848, in which he describes her as having been: "brisk-talking, friendly and an entertaining character". He goes on to say that she "has been beautiful" at one time; with "plenty of money, fair health, but nothing to do".

Louisa died on 19 April 1862 at the age of 81, and was buried in Barnwell, Northamptonshire. Following her death, Jane Carlyle wrote in a letter to a relative in Scotland - "Nobody will believe what a loss Lady Sandwich is to us. They say 'a woman of eighty! That is not to be regretted.' But her intimate friends know that this woman of eighty was the most charming companion and the loyallest, warmest friend; was the only person in London or in the world that Mr C. regularly used to see. Twice a week he used to call for her; and now his horse makes for her house whenever he gets into the region of Grosvenor Square, and does not see or understand the escutcheon that turns me sick as I drive past."

== In art ==
A bust of Lady Louisa was made by renowned Venetian sculptor Antonio Canova. She was also the subject of at least three portraits; one was an allegorical portrait painted by Sir Thomas Lawrence in which she is represented as Hope. It is displayed at the La Salle University Art Museum.
