= Somerset Lowry-Corry =

- Somerset Lowry-Corry, 2nd Earl Belmore
- Somerset Lowry-Corry, 4th Earl Belmore
