= Dorothy Lowry-Corry =

Irish historian and archaeologist

Lady Dorothy Lowry-Corry
- Born: 1885; Castle Coole, Enniskillen, County Fermanagh, Ireland
- Died: 22 March 1967 (aged 81–82)
- Parent: The 4th Earl Belmore

Lady Dorothy Lowry-Corry (1885 – 22 March 1967) was an Irish historian and archaeologist with a particular focus on the Early Christian period. She wrote a number of papers, many for the Royal Irish Academy and the Ulster Journal of Archaeology. She was particularly involved in the recording of the stone figures on Boa Island and Lustymore Island. She also discovered the Corracloona Court Tomb in County Leitrim. Lady Dorothy was the vice-president of the Royal Society of Antiquaries of Ireland (RSAI) and represented County Fermanagh on the Ancient Monuments Advisory Committee. As the daughter of an earl, she was styled as 'Lady' before her first name.

== Biography ==
Lady Dorothy Lowry-Corry was born at Castle Coole, a country house on the outskirts of Enniskillen in County Fermanagh in Ulster, as one of the 13 children of the 4th Earl Belmore and his wife, Anne Elizabeth Honoria Gladstone. Lowry-Corry was interested in history and genealogy from an early age, and this developed into an interest in history, with a particular focus on the Early Christian period. She wrote a number of papers, many for the Royal Irish Academy and the Ulster Journal of Archaeology. She was particularly involved in the recording of the stone figures on Boa Island and Lustymore Island. She also discovered the Corracloona Court Tomb in the north of County Leitrim, and was responsible for a field survey of the ancient monuments of County Fermanagh, with which she was assisted by Maisie Gaffikin (1889–1959) and Estyn Evans.

Lowry-Corry was the vice-president of the Royal Society of Antiquaries of Ireland (RSAI) and represented County Fermanagh on the Ancient Monuments Advisory Committee.

Lady Dorothy died on 22 March 1967.
