= Guilin Laurent Bizanet =

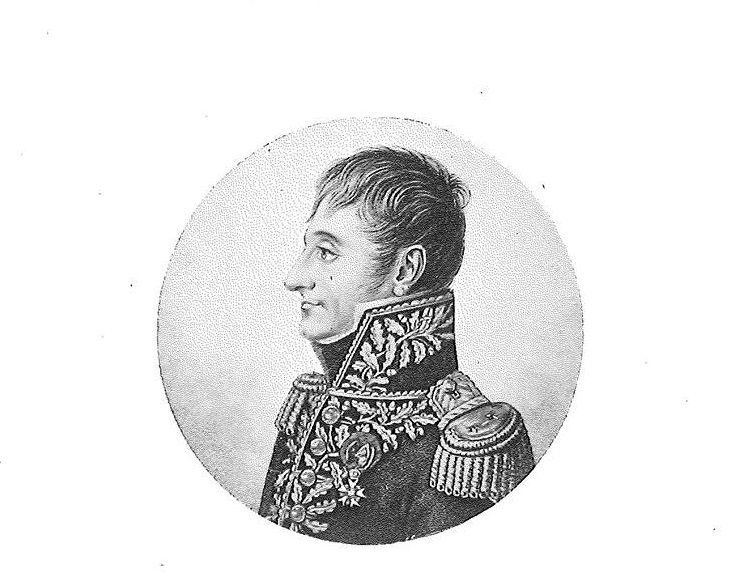
- Born: August 10, 1755; Grenoble
- Died: April 18, 1836 (aged 80)
- Military career
- Allegiance: France
- Rank: Divisional general
- Awards: Legion of Honour

Guilin Laurent Bizanet (French pronunciation: [ɡilɛ̃ lɔʁɑ̃ bizanɛ]; 10 August 1755 – 18 April 1836) was a Republican French Revolutionary General who served during the American Revolutionary War, French Revolutionary Wars and the Napoleonic Wars.

== Life ==
Born in Grenoble, capital of the province of Dauphiné, Bizanet began his career as a sailor-gunner on 4 November 1780 and was aboard the Majestueux during the American Revolutionary War from 11 June 1781 to 24 January 1783. After volunteering for the army, he became a brigadier-general on 22 August 1793 and a divisional general on 10 April 1794. He was a defender at Monaco in 1793 and at the end of the French Consulate in 1804 became the commander of the armies in Marseille.

He was named commandant at the fortress of Bergen op Zoom in 1810 and successfully repelled a night attack on 8 March 1814 led by General Sir Thomas Graham. After the attack, Graham wrote in a despatch to London:

"Sir ... I am anxious too to do justice to the conduct of General Bizanet, which, truly characteristic of a brave man, has been marked from the first with the most kind and humane attentions to the prisoners."

Bizanet was commander of Marseille during the Hundred Days under Marshal Guillaume Brune.

== Awards ==
He was made a Knight of the Legion of Honour on 12 December 1803 then an Officer of the same order on 14 June 1804. On 19 July 1814 he was made a Knight of the Order of Saint Louis by Louis XVIII. His name is engraved on the 40th Column of the Arc de Triomph
