= John Proby, 2nd Earl of Carysfort =

British Army general

General The Right Honourable The Earl of Carysfort
- Arms of Proby: Ermine, on a fess gules a lion passant or
- Born: 1780
- Died: 11 June 1855 (aged 74–75); Bristol
- Burial place: Arnos Vale Cemetery, Bristol
- Military career
- Allegiance: United Kingdom
- Branch: British Army
- Service years: 1795–1814
- Rank: General
- Unit: 1st Foot Guards
- Commands: Cádiz Garrison
- Conflicts: French Revolutionary Wars; Irish Rebellion of 1798; Egypt Campaign; Napoleonic Wars; Peninsular War; Battle of Corunna; Siege of Cádiz; Siege of Tarifa; Siege of Burgos; Walcheren Campaign; Siege of Bergen op Zoom

General John Proby, 2nd Earl of Carysfort (1780 – 11 June 1855), known as Lord Proby from 1804 to 1828, was a British military commander and Whig politician.

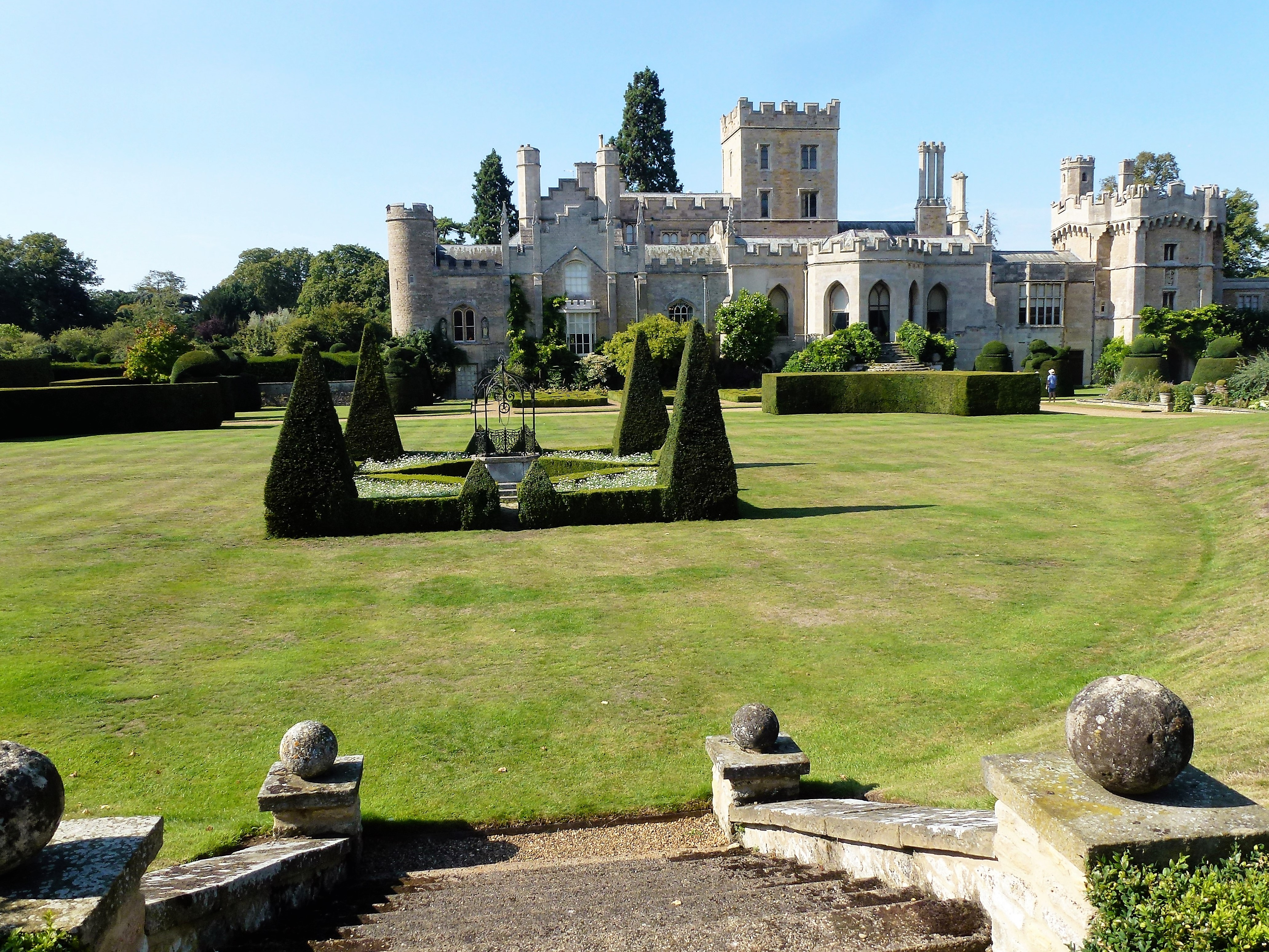
Elton Hall, Cambridgeshire

Proby was the second but eldest surviving son of John Proby, 1st Earl of Carysfort, and his wife Elizabeth (née Osbourne), and was educated at Rugby. He gained the courtesy title of Lord Proby when his elder brother died in 1804. He succeeded his father in 1828, inheriting Elton Hall in Huntingdonshire (now in Cambridgeshire).

He was commissioned into the British Army in 1794 and fought in the French Revolutionary Wars. Carysfort was promoted to major-general in 1814, and in that year took part in the ill-fated attack on Bergen op Zoom in the Netherlands. He was promoted to lieutenant-general in 1830 and to general in 1846.

Apart from his military career he also represented Buckingham in the House of Commons from 1805 to 1806 and Huntingdonshire from 1806 to 1807 and again from 1814 to 1818. Proby was supportive of the British abolitionist movement.

Lord Carysfort died in June 1855. He never married and was succeeded in the earldom by his younger brother Granville.

== Notes ==
Parliament of the United Kingdom
Preceded by Thomas Grenville; Lord Proby	Member of Parliament for Buckingham; 1805–1806; With: Thomas Grenville	Succeeded by Thomas Grenville; Earl Percy
Preceded by Viscount Hinchingbrooke; Lord Frederick Montagu	Member of Parliament for Huntingdonshire; 1806–1807; With: Viscount Hinchingbrooke	Succeeded by Viscount Hinchingbrooke; William Henry Fellowes
Preceded by Viscount Hinchingbrooke; William Henry Fellowes	Member of Parliament for Huntingdonshire; 1814–1818; With: William Henry Fellowes	Succeeded by William Henry Fellowes; Lord Frederick Montagu
Peerage of Ireland
Preceded by John Joshua Proby	Earl of Carysfort; 1828–1855	Succeeded by Granville Leveson Proby
