= Lord Frederick Montagu =

British politician

Postmaster General
- In office 1826–1827
- Monarch: George IV
- Prime Minister: The Earl of Liverpool
- Preceded by: The Earl of Chichester
- Succeeded by: The Duke of Manchester

Personal details
- Born: 8 November 1774
- Died: 4 October 1827 (aged 52)
- Parent(s): George Montagu, 4th Duke of Manchester; Elizabeth Dashwood

Lord Frederick Montagu (8 November 1774 – 4 October 1827) was a British politician. He was Postmaster General between 1826 and 1827.

== Background ==
Montagu was a younger son of George Montagu, 4th Duke of Manchester, and Elizabeth, daughter of Sir James Dashwood, 2nd Baronet. William Montagu, 5th Duke of Manchester, was his elder brother. He was educated at Harrow School.

== Political career ==
Montagu sat as Member of Parliament for Huntingdonshire between 1796 and 1806 and between 1818 and 1820. He served under the Earl of Liverpool as Postmaster General between 1826 and 1827.

== Personal life ==
Montagu died unmarried in October 1827, aged 52.

Parliament of Great Britain
Preceded by The Earl Ludlow; Viscount Hinchingbrooke	Member of Parliament for Huntingdonshire; 1796–1801; With: Viscount Hinchingbrooke	Succeeded by Parliament of the United Kingdom
Parliament of the United Kingdom
Preceded by Parliament of Great Britain	Member of Parliament for Huntingdonshire; 1801–1806; With: Viscount Hinchingbrooke	Succeeded by Viscount Hinchingbrooke; Lord Proby
Preceded by William Henry Fellowes; Lord Proby	Member of Parliament for Huntingdonshire; 1818–1820; With: William Henry Fellowes	Succeeded by William Henry Fellowes; Lord John Russell
Political offices
Preceded by The Earl of Chichester	Postmaster General; 1826–1827	Succeeded by The Duke of Manchester
