= Lady Harriet Mary Montagu =

British socialite and hostess (1805-1857)

The Right Honourable The Lady Ashburton
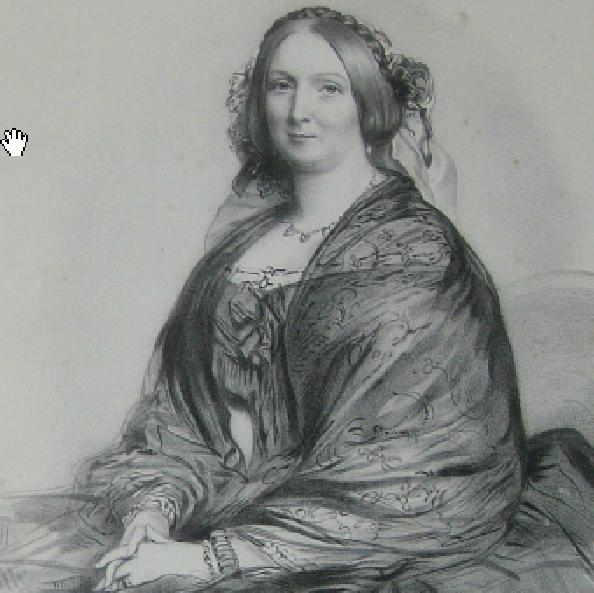
- by Francis Holl
- Born: 14 May 1805
- Died: 4 May 1857 (aged 51); Paris
- Known for: Literary hostess
- Spouse: William Bingham Baring, 2nd Baron Ashburton (m. 1823)
- Children: 1
- Parents: George Montagu (father); Louisa Lowry-Corry (mother)

Harriet Mary Baring, Baroness Ashburton (née Lady Harriet Montagu) (14 May 1805 – 4 May 1857) was a socialite and hostess.

She was born in 1805 to George Montagu, 6th Earl of Sandwich and Louisa Montagu, Countess of Sandwich.

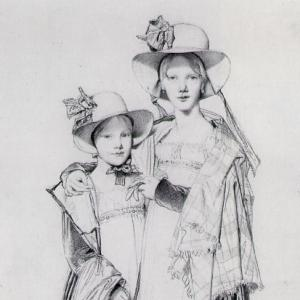
Lady Harriet Mary Montagu and her sister Lady Catherine Caroline Montagu

She married William Bingham Baring, 2nd Baron Ashburton on 12 April 1823. He had graduated from Oriel College, Oxford in 1823 and he was an M.P. by 1826. He was the Member of Parliament for Thetford, Callington, Winchester, North Staffordshire and finally Thetford for a second time before he became a peer in 1848. He served in Sir Robert Peel's government despite his shyness.

She was witty and direct. The welcome that she gave at her various houses attracted leading men of her time: William Thackeray, John Stuart Mill and especially Thomas Carlyle enjoyed her company. She and the Earl of Sandwich were notably wealthy and they had houses in Surrey, Bath House, Piccadilly, another near Portsmouth and a place near Winchester. The Earl was involved in government, a fellow of the Royal Society, and a trustee of the National Gallery and in 1860 he became President of the Royal Geographical Society.

The Grange was one of the locations of Ashburton hospitality (1870 photo)

She was the hostess for, and a source of friction between, Thomas Carlyle and his wife, Jane Welsh Carlyle. Jane Carlyle was jealous of the attention that her husband gave to his hostess, but was also professed herself one of her admirers, describing her as "the wittiest and most highly bred woman of her time". As a literary hostess, she had been described as chinless, large, and with an unusual nose, but both the Carlyles recognised her intelligence. Jane noted that despite her appearance she was "almost beautiful—simply through the intelligence and cordiality of her expression." This said, Jane was however scathing about Harriet's personality: “A very loveable spoilt Child of Fortune — that a little whipping, judiciously administered, would have made into a first-rate woman.”

She died in Paris on 4 May 1857 having had only one child who died as an infant. Her husband married Louisa Caroline Stewart-Mackenzie at Bath House in Piccadilly on 17 November 1858.
