= George Montagu, 6th Earl of Sandwich =

British politician

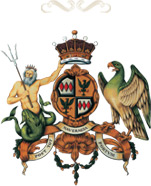
Coat of arms of the Earls of Sandwich

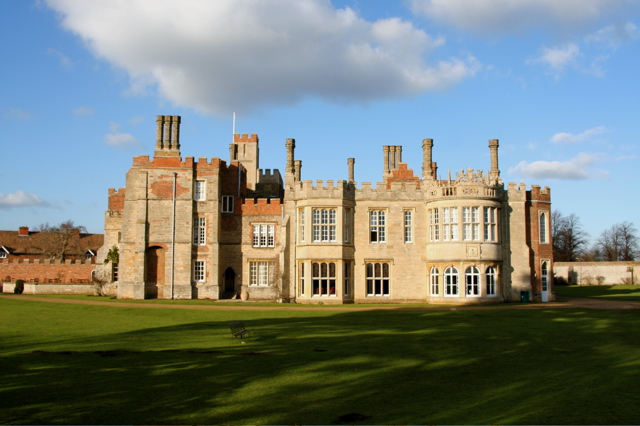
Hinchingbrooke House, Huntingdon

George John Montagu, 6th Earl of Sandwich (4 February 1773 – 21 May 1818) was the son of John Montagu, 5th Earl of Sandwich and Lady Mary Henrietta Powlett. He was styled Viscount Hinchingbrooke from 1790 until in 1814 when, his elder half-brother having died, he inherited the earldom from his father, together with the Hinchingbrooke estate in Huntingdonshire. He was educated at Eton College (1780–90) and Trinity College, Cambridge (1790-92).

He was MP for Huntingdonshire from 1794 to 1814.

On the outbreak of the Napoleonic War in 1803 he was appointed Colonel of the Huntingdon Volunteers. When the Volunteers were replaced by the Local Militia in 1808, Hinchingbrooke and most of his officers transferred to the Huntingdonshire Local Militia, to which he was gazetted in the rank of Lieutenant-Colonel-Commandant.

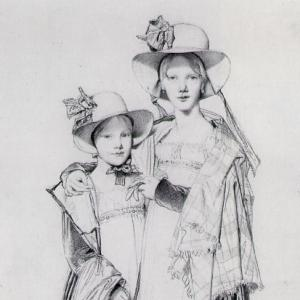
Lady Harriet Mary Montagu und Lady Cathrine Caroline Montagu

He married in 1804 Lady Louisa Mary Ann Julia Harriet Lowry-Corry, daughter of Armar Lowry-Corry, 1st Earl Belmore and Lady Harriet Hobart. Together they had two daughters and one son, John William, who would succeed his father in the earldom:

- Lady Harriet Mary Montagu (14 May 1805 – 4 May 1857), married William Bingham Baring, 2nd Baron Ashburton
- Lady Catherine Caroline Montagu (7 October 1808 – 30 April 1834), married Count Alexandre Colonna-Walewski, an illegitimate son of Napoleon I and Marie, Countess Walewska
- John Montagu, 7th Earl of Sandwich (8 November 1811 – 3 March 1884), married firstly Lady Mary Paget; married secondly Lady Blanche Egerton.

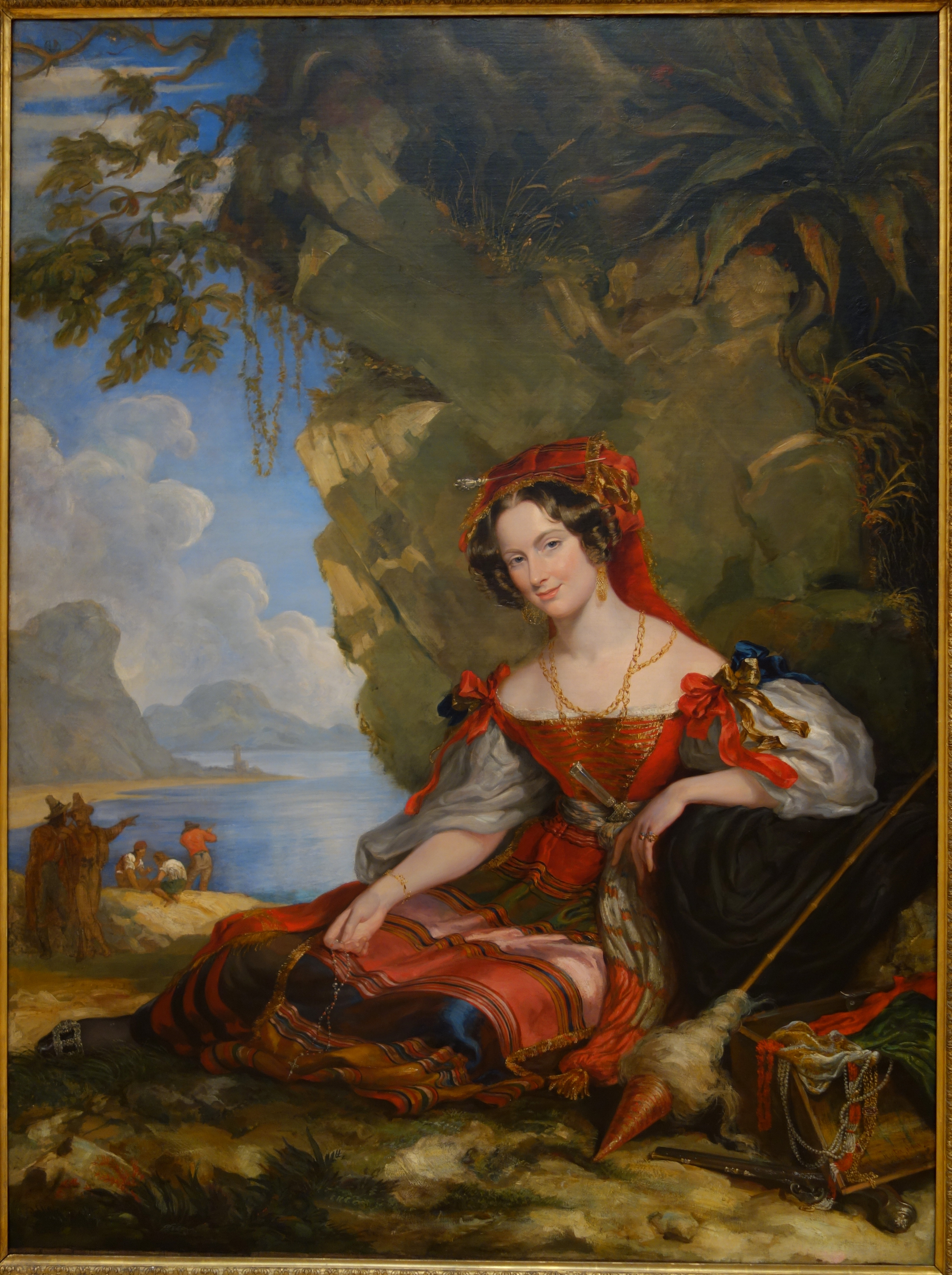
Portrait of Lady Caroline Montagu in Byronic Costume by George Hayter, 1831.

He died in Rome in 1818.

Parliament of Great Britain
Preceded by The Earl Ludlow; Lancelot Brown	Member of Parliament for Huntingdonshire; 1794–1801; With: The Earl Ludlow 1794–1796; Lord Frederick Montagu 1796–1801	Succeeded by Parliament of the United Kingdom
Parliament of the United Kingdom
Preceded by Parliament of Great Britain	Member of Parliament for Huntingdonshire; 1801–1814; With: Lord Frederick Montagu 1801–1806; Lord Proby 1806–1807; William Henry Fellowes 1807–1814	Succeeded by William Henry Fellowes; Lord Proby
Peerage of England
Preceded by John Montagu	Earl of Sandwich; 1814–1818	Succeeded by John Montagu
