= William Henry Fellowes =

British politician

- Born: 15 July 1769
- Died: 23 August 1837 (aged 68)
- Spouse: Emma Benyon
- Parent(s): William Fellowes and Lavinia Smyth

William Henry Fellowes (15 July 1769 – 23 August 1837), of Ramsey Abbey in Huntingdonshire and Haveringland Hall in Norfolk, was a British Member of Parliament.

== Life ==
He was the eldest son of William Fellowes and Lavinia Smyth. He matriculated at St John's College, Cambridge in 1796, graduating B.A. in 1790 and M.A. in 1793. He was elected to the House of Commons for Huntingdon in 1796, a seat he held until 1807, and then represented Huntingdonshire from 1807 to 1830.

Fellowes died on 23 August 1837 and was buried at the Church of St Thomas à Becket, Ramsey, Cambridgeshire.

== Family ==
Fellowes married Emma Benyon, daughter of Richard Benyon MP: they had four sons and a daughter. Their eldest surviving son Edward Fellowes was elevated to the peerage as Baron de Ramsey in 1887.

The third son, Richard, was Conservative MP for Berkshire. Their grandsons William Fellowes, 2nd Baron de Ramsey, and Ailwyn Fellowes, 1st Baron Ailwyn were both Conservative government ministers. Another grandson, James Herbert Benyon, was Lord Lieutenant of Berkshire.

== Notes ==
Parliament of Great Britain
Preceded by John Willett Payne; Henry Speed	Member of Parliament for Huntingdon; 1796–1800; With: John Calvert	Succeeded by (Parliament of Great Britain abolished)
Parliament of the United Kingdom
Preceded by (self in Parliament of Great Britain)	Member of Parliament for Huntingdon; 1801–1807; With: John Calvert	Succeeded by John Calvert; William Meeke Farmer
Preceded by Viscount Hinchingbrooke; Lord Proby	Member of Parliament for Huntingdonshire; 1807–1830; With: Viscount Hinchingbrooke 1807–1814; Lord Proby 1814–1818; Lord Frederick Montagu 1818–1820; Lord John Russell 1820–1826; Viscount Mandeville 1826–1830	Succeeded by Viscount Mandeville; Lord Strathavon
