= Siege of Bergen op Zoom (1814) =

1814 siege of the War of the Sixth Coalition

- Part of the War of the Sixth Coalition
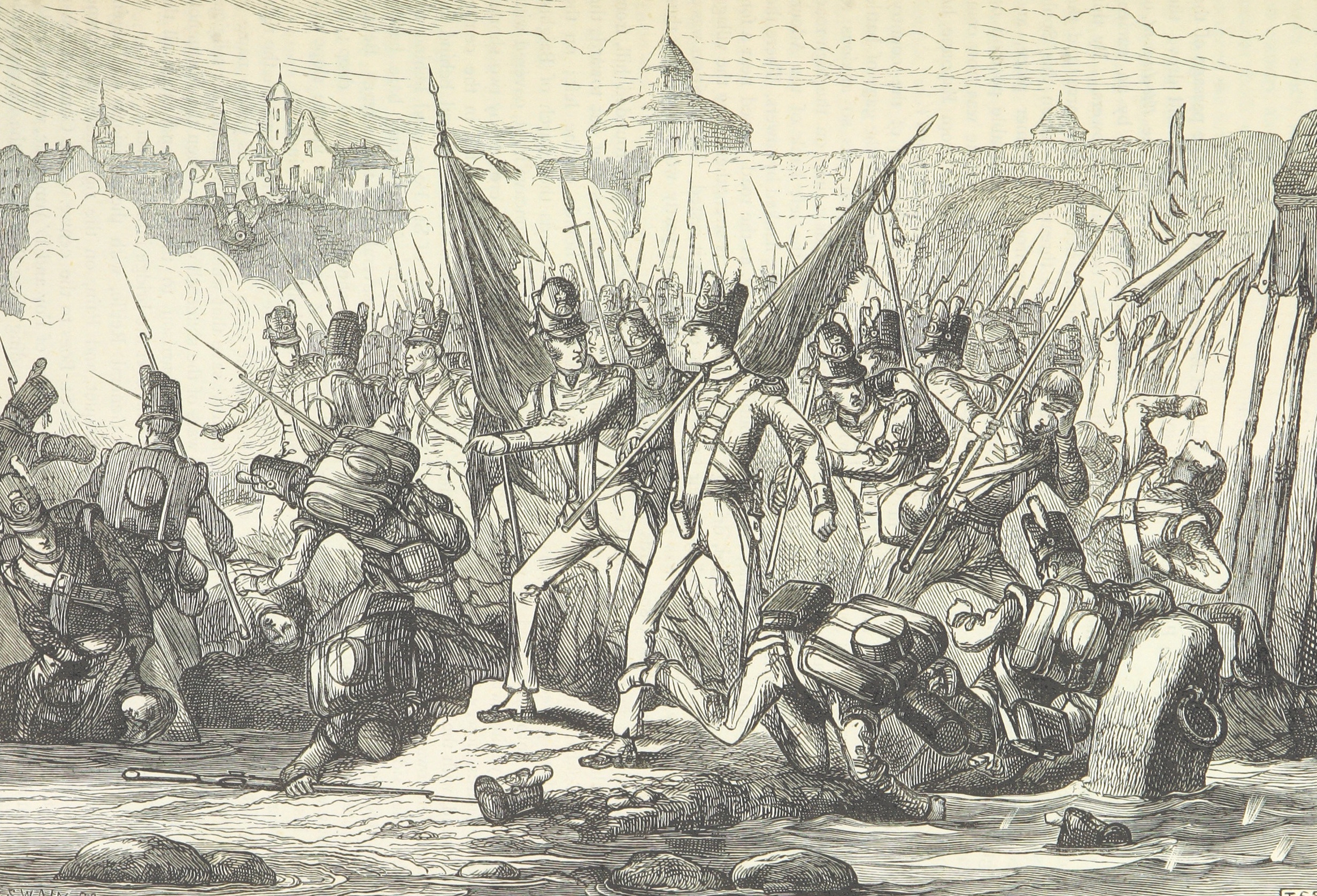
- 1873 illustration of the siege
Date	8 March 1814
Location	Bergen op Zoom, Deux-Nèthes, First French Empire 51.4960°N 4.2847°E
Result	French victory

Belligerents
France	United Kingdom

Commanders and leaders
Jean-Jacques Ambert; Guilin Laurent Bizanet	Thomas Graham

Strength
2,700	4,000–9,000

Casualties and losses
500–600 killed, wounded or captured	920–1,900 killed or wounded 2,263 captured
- Location within Europe

War of the Sixth Coalition:
Campaign Low Countries 1814
The color black indicates the current battle.

The siege of Bergen op Zoom (the historian Gaston Bodart referred to it as the raid and engagement at Bergen-op-Zoom) took place on 8 March 1814 during the War of the Sixth Coalition between a British force led by Thomas Graham, 1st Baron Lynedoch and a French garrison under Guilin Laurent Bizanet and Jean-Jacques Ambert. The initial British assault force seized part of the defences, but a well-managed French counterattack compelled much of the assault force to surrender. Bergen op Zoom is a port in the Netherlands about 70 kilometres (43 mi) south of Rotterdam and 40 kilometres (25 mi) north of Antwerp in Belgium.

== Assault ==
French General Guilin Laurent Bizanet had 2,700 soldiers in the garrison when, under cover of night and using local intelligence, Graham attacked. The French, however, were positioned well, and the population allied with them as they fought in the streets. The attacking British troops took heavy casualties. General Bizanet remained in control of Bergen op Zoom until a peace accord was signed.

== Forces and casualties ==
One source named Bizanet as the governor and Jean-Jacques Ambert as the French commander. The 2,700-man French garrison sustained 500 killed and wounded and 100 captured during the action. Depending on sources, the British assault force consisted of between 4,000 and 9,000 men. Of them, between 2,100 and 4,000 were killed, wounded or captured. In addition to the units listed below, the source counted the 2nd Battalion of the 35th Foot in the assault force. The Guards Brigade consisted of three companies of the 1st Foot Guards and four companies each of the 2nd Foot Guards and 3rd Foot Guards, all from the 2nd Battalions of the regiments.

== British Order of Battle ==
Graham formed his troops into four columns as follows:

	Commander	Unit	Number of Men
1st Column	Colonel Lord Proby	Brigade of Guards	1,000
2nd Column	Lieutenant-colonel Morrice, 69th Foot	55th Foot	250
		69th Foot	350
		33rd Foot	600
3rd Column	Lieutenant-colonel Henry, 21st Foot	21st Foot	400
		91st Foot	100
		37th Foot	150
4th Column	Brigadier-general Gore / Lieutenant-colonel Carleton	44th Foot	300
		Flank companies of the 21st and 37th Foot	200
		1st Foot	600
		Total	3,950
