= Earl Belmore =

Title in the peerage of Ireland

Earldom of Belmore
- Arms: Quarterly: 1st, Quarterly I & IV, Gules, A Saltire Argent, in chief a Rose Or (Corry); II & III, Sable, a Cup Argent, issuing therefrom a Garland between two Laurel Branches Vert (Lowrey); 2nd, Gules, a Saltire Argent, on chief a Rose Or (Corry); 3rd, Argent, on a Bend Azure, three Buckles Or (Leslie); 4th, Or, a Lion rampant Gules, over all a Bendlet Sable (Abernethy). Crests: 1st, a Cock proper (Corry); 2nd, A Garland of Laurel between two Branches of Laurel proper (Lowry). Supporters: On either side a Tiger Cat guardant proper, ducally gorged and chained Or.
- Creation date: 20 November 1797
- Created by: George III
- Peerage: Peerage of Ireland
- First holder: Armar Lowry-Corry, 1st Viscount Belmore
- Present holder: John Lowry-Corry, 8th Earl Belmore
- Heir apparent: John Lowry-Corry, Viscount Corry
- Subsidiary titles: Viscount Belmore; Baron Belmore
- Status: Extant
- Seat: Castle Coole
- Motto: VIRTUS SEMPER VIRDIS (Virtue is always green)

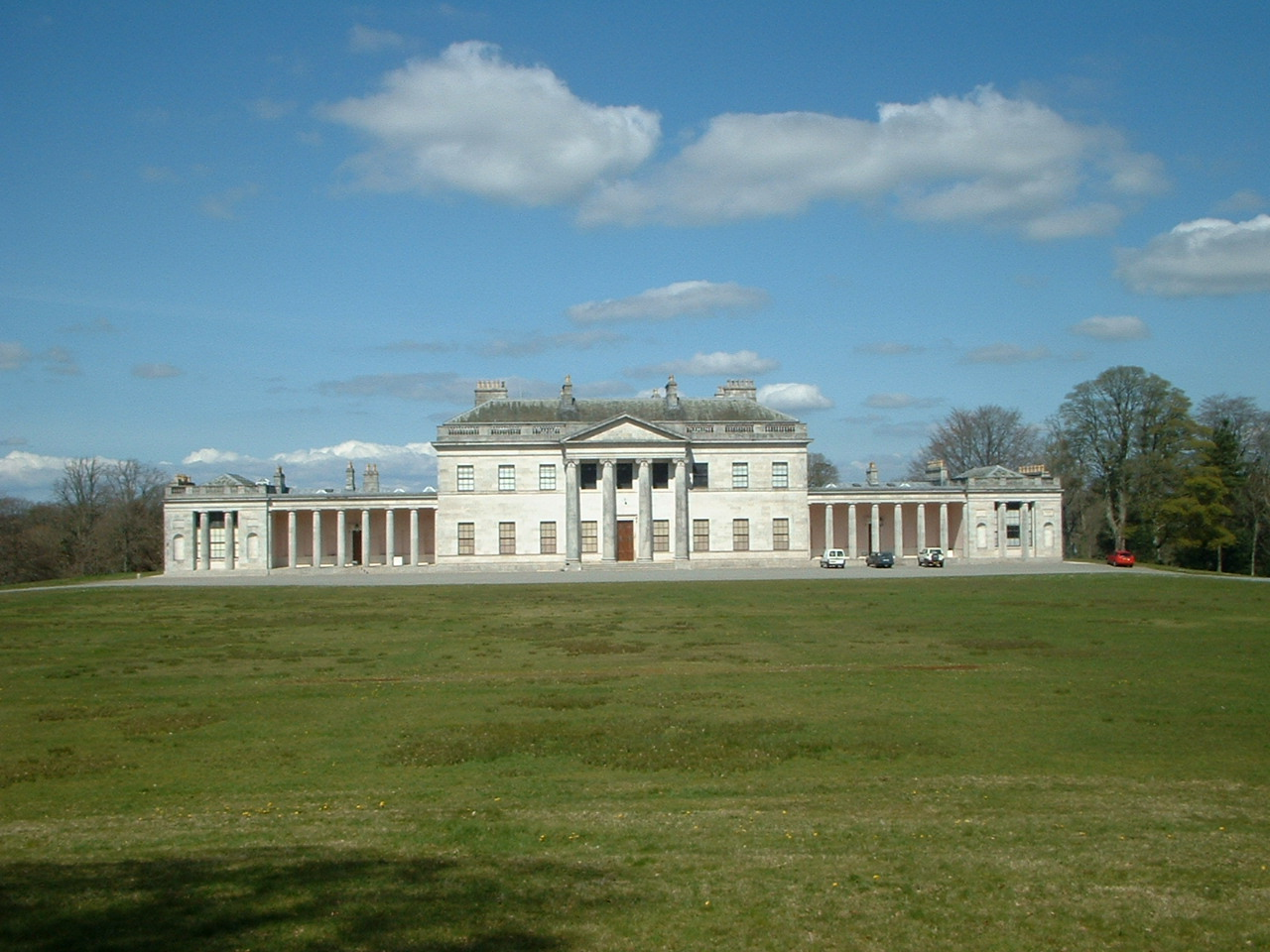
Castle Coole, the family seat

Earl Belmore is a title in the Peerage of Ireland that was created in 1797 for Armar Lowry-Corry, 1st Viscount Belmore, who had previously represented County Tyrone in the Irish House of Commons. He had already been created Baron Belmore, of Castle Coole in County Fermanagh (now in Northern Ireland), in 1781 and Viscount Belmore in 1789, also in the Peerage of Ireland. Born Armar Lowry, he was the son of Galbraith Lowry, Member of the Irish House of Commons for County Tyrone, and his wife Sarah, daughter of Colonel John Corry. In 1774, he assumed by Royal licence the additional surname of Corry. He was succeeded by his eldest son, the second Earl. He represented County Tyrone in both the Irish and British House of Commons, sat in the House of Lords as an Irish representative peer from 1819 to 1841, and served as Governor of Jamaica from 1828 to 1832.

His eldest son, the third Earl, represented County Fermanagh at Westminster. On his early death, the titles passed to his eldest son, the fourth Earl. He was an Irish Representative Peer between 1857 and 1913, and he served under the Earl of Derby as Under-Secretary of State for the Home Department between 1866 and 1867. From 1867 to 1872, Lord Belmore was Governor of New South Wales. The line of the fourth Earl failed on the death of his younger son, the sixth Earl, in 1949, and he was succeeded by his first cousin once removed, the seventh Earl. He was the son of Major Adrian Lowry-Corry, fifth son of Admiral the Hon. Armar Lowry-Corry, himself the second son of the third Earl. As of 2014, the titles are held by his son, the eighth Earl, who succeeded in 1960.

Several other members of the Lowry-Corry family have also gained distinction. The Conservative politician the Honourable Henry Lowry-Corry, First Lord of the Admiralty from 1866 to 1867, was the second son of the second Earl. His younger son was Montagu Corry, 1st Baron Rowton, private secretary to Benjamin Disraeli. The Honourable Armar Lowry-Corry (1836–1919), second son of the third Earl, was an admiral in the Royal Navy. The Honourable Henry Lowry-Corry, younger son of the third Earl, was also a politician.

The invented title of Viscount Corry is used as a courtesy title for the Earl's heir apparent. The family seat is Castle Coole, near Enniskillen, County Fermanagh.

== Earls Belmore (1797) ==
- Armar Lowry-Corry, 1st Earl Belmore (1740–1802)
- Somerset Lowry-Corry, 2nd Earl Belmore (1774–1841)
- Armar Lowry-Corry, 3rd Earl Belmore (1801–1845)
- Somerset Richard Lowry-Corry, 4th Earl Belmore (1835–1913)
- Armar Lowry-Corry, 5th Earl Belmore (1870–1948)
- Cecil Lowry-Corry, 6th Earl Belmore (1873–1949)
- Galbraith Armar Lowry-Corry, 7th Earl Belmore (1913–1960)
- John Armar Lowry-Corry, 8th Earl Belmore (born 1951)

The heir apparent is the present holder's son, John Armar Galbraith Lowry-Corry, Viscount Corry (born 1985).
