= Galbraith Lowry-Corry, 7th Earl Belmore =

Irish peer (1913–1960)

Galbraith Armar Lowry-Corry, 7th Earl Belmore (14 April 1913 – 20 July 1960) was an Irish peer and the son of Major Adrian Lowry-Corry, himself the son of Admiral the Hon. Armar Lowry-Corry (the second son of Armar Lowry-Corry, 3rd Earl Belmore).

== Early years and career ==
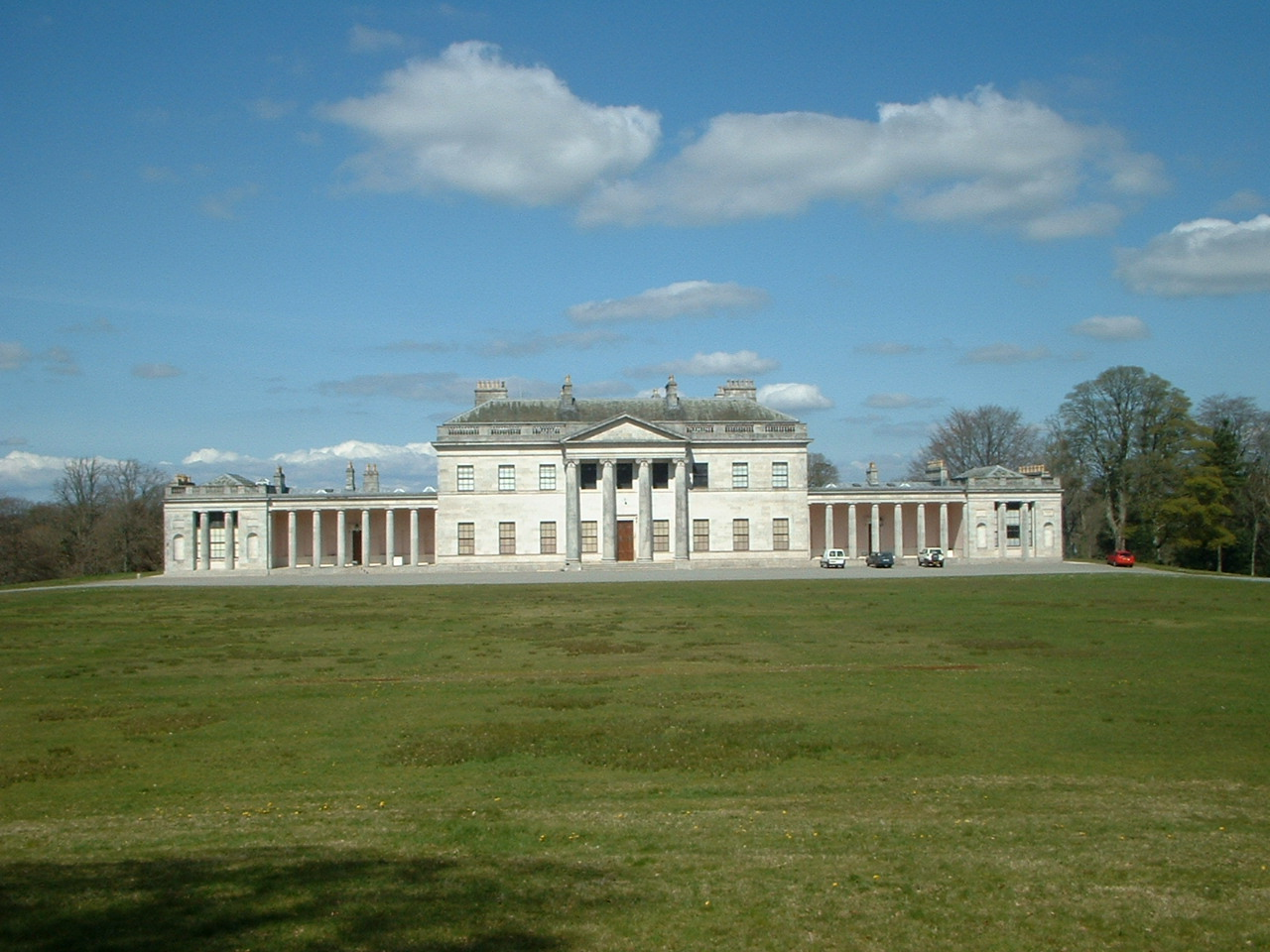
Castle Coole, Co Fermanagh

He was educated at Lancing College in Sussex and then at the Royal Military College, Sandhurst in Berkshire. He fought in the Second World War and was wounded in action and later gained the rank of Major in the service of the Royal Inniskilling Fusiliers.

Major Lowry-Corry was serving with the Inniskillings in Malaya in 1949 when his commanding officer handed him a telegram addressed 'Lord Belmore'. It signalled that his bachelor cousin, the 6th Earl of Belmore, had died and that he, a great nephew of the 4th Earl, had succeeded to the earldom and the family seat of Castle Coole. He took immediate leave and returned to Ireland.

Lord Belmore held the offices of Justice of the Peace and Deputy Lieutenant for County Fermanagh.

== Castle Coole ==
During his time at Castle Coole the house was modernised, with electricity being installed and parts of the house open to the public by 1955. Seventy acres of land were also transferred to the National Trust while commercial woods were planted on the estate and a golf course was opened.

== Family ==
He married Gloria Anthea Harker, daughter of Herbert Bryant Harker, of Melbourne, Australia, on 18 February 1939, and had issue:

- John Lowry-Corry, 8th Earl Belmore
- Lady Anthea Geraldine Lowry-Corry (b. 16 February 1942), who was married on 24 April 1965 to Patrick Mathew Desmond Forde DL, of Seaforde, County Down, son of Lieutenant Colonel Desmond Forde DL and the Hon. Margaret Ward (daughter of Maxwell Ward, 6th Viscount Bangor), and has issue.
- Lady Sarah Lilian Lowry-Corry (b. 31 March 1945), who was married to Gary McNulty in 1979 and has issue.

Lord Belmore died on 20 July 1960 aged 47 and was succeeded by his son.

Peerage of Ireland
Preceded by Cecil Lowry-Corry	Earl Belmore; 1949–1960	Succeeded by John Lowry-Corry
