= Somerset Lowry-Corry, 4th Earl Belmore =

Irish nobleman and politician (1835–1913)

The Right Honourable The Earl Belmore GCMG PC (Ire)
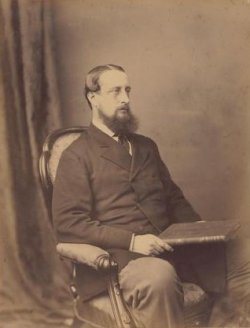

Governor of New South Wales
- In office 8 January 1868 – 21 February 1872
- Monarch: Victoria
- Preceded by: Sir John Young, Bt
- Succeeded by: Sir Hercules Robinson

Personal details
- Born: 9 April 1835 London
- Died: 6 April 1913 (aged 77) Castle Coole, Enniskillen
- Spouse: Anne Elizabeth Honoria Gladstone (m. 1861)
- Children: 13, including Armar, Cecil, and Dorothy
- Parents: Armar Lowry-Corry (father); Emily Louise Shepherd (mother)
- Relatives: John Neilson Gladstone (father-in-law); John Gladstone (brother-in-law)
- Education: Eton College
- Alma mater: Trinity College, Cambridge

Somerset Richard Lowry-Corry, 4th Earl Belmore, GCMG, PC (Ire) (9 April 1835 – 6 April 1913), styled as Viscount Corry from 1841 to 1845, was an Irish nobleman and Conservative politician who served as Governor of New South Wales from 1868 to 1872.

== Background and education ==
Born on Bruton Street in London, he was the eldest son of the 3rd Earl Belmore and his wife, Emily Louise Shepherd, youngest daughter of William Shepherd. Belmore succeeded his father in the earldom on 24 December 1845, at the age of only 10, at the start of the Great Famine in Ireland. He was educated at Eton and at Trinity College, Cambridge, from where he graduated with a Master of Arts in 1856.

== Career ==
=== English government ===
Belmore was elected as an Irish representative peer and sat in the House of Lords from January 1857 until his death. He served under the Earl of Derby as Under-Secretary of State for the Home Department from July 1866 to August 1867, and was then appointed Governor of New South Wales, on 22 August. He was sworn of the Privy Council of Ireland on 17 September.

=== Governor of New South Wales ===
Belmore became Governor and Commander-in-Chief of New South Wales on 8 January 1868 at a time when the position was not yet just a figurehead, but was still an imperial officer responsible to the British government. On 12 March 1868, Lord Belmore was attending a picnic with the visiting Prince Alfred at the Sydney beachside suburb of Clontarf, when Henry James O'Farrell shot Alfred in the back and claimed to have intended to shoot Belmore as well. Although Belmore did not see the incident, he arranged for Alfred's transfer to hospital for treatment and passed on to the colonial government the Prince's request for clemency for O'Farrell, which was ignored. He worked effectively to calm the sectarian passions unleashed by the incident.

Belmore succeeded in having the Audit Act 1870 passed, which established the principle that government expenditure had to be authorised by appropriation through both houses of Parliament, which had not been the practice until that time. He found the Sydney summers oppressive and therefore rented Throsby Park, near Moss Vale, as his country house. He resigned to protect his wife's health and to resume his parliamentary career, and left Sydney on 21 February 1872.

== Later life ==
Lord Belmore was a Justice of the Peace in County Fermanagh, County Tyrone and Kent. He served as one of the Lords Justices of Ireland on several occasions in the 1890s and was made Lord Lieutenant of County Tyrone in 1892, having been previously a Deputy Lieutenant. He was also a captain in the Fermanagh Militia and a major in the London Irish Royal Volunteers.

== Marriage and children ==
Lord Belmore married Anne Elizabeth Honoria Gladstone, daughter of Captain John Neilson Gladstone, MP, the son of Sir John Gladstone, 1st Baronet, and Elizabeth Honoria Bateson, the daughter of Sir Robert Bateson, 1st Bt., and sister of the 1st Baron Deramore, on 22 August 1861 in St George's, Hanover Square, London. All told, the couple had 13 children: 3 sons and 10 daughters. While all 13 children survived into adulthood, unusually, only two of the 13 (Florence and Kathleen) ever married or had children.

The children were, in order of birth:

- Lady Theresa Lowry-Corry (24 October 1862 – 18 March 1938), who was unmarried
- Lady Florence Lowry-Corry (31 March 1864 – 10 May 1943), who was married on 12 October 1893 to Lieutenant Colonel John Henry Eden (who d. 1931), formerly one of HM Inspectors of Schools and a former major in the Yorkshire Regiment, and had issue
- Lady Madeline Lowry-Corry (6 November 1865 – 30 March 1898), who was unmarried
- Lady Mary Lowry-Corry (5 August 1867 – 5 October 1928), who was unmarried
- Armar Lowry-Corry, 5th Earl Belmore, (5 May 1870 – 12 February 1948) who was unmarried
- Cecil Lowry-Corry, 6th Earl Belmore, (20 March 1873 – 2 March 1949) who was unmarried
- The Hon. Ernest Lowry-Corry (23 November 1874 – 11 March 1912), who was educated at Wellington College and was unmarried
- Lady Winifred Lowry-Corry (18 August 1876 – 1959), who was unmarried
- Lady Edith Lowry-Corry (26 August 1878 – 25 October 1918), who was drowned in Lough Yoan at Castle Coole, and was unmarried. According to a local legend, she then turned into a greylag goose.
- Lady Violet Lowry-Corry (15 June 1881 – 1969), who was unmarried
- Lady Margaret Lowry-Corry (15 July 1883 – 1975), who was unmarried
- Lady Dorothy Lowry-Corry (6 June 1885 – 1967), who was unmarried
- Lady Kathleen Lowry-Corry (28 July 1887 – 13 October 1972), who was married on 7 May 1919 as his second wife to Brigadier General Thomas Ward CMG, of Brynhir, Criccieth, co. Carmarthen (who d. 16 January 1949), and had issue

Lord Belmore died on 6 April 1913 aged 77 at Castle Coole, Enniskillen and was buried on 9 April 1913 in Derryvullen, County Fermanagh.

He owned 19,000 acres in Tyrone and Fermanagh.

== Honours ==
Belmore was invested as a Knight Commander of the Order of St Michael and St George (KCMG) on 22 March 1872, later being promoted to Knight Grand Cross (GCMG) in the New Year's Honours list 1 January 1890. Belmore Park near Sydney's Central railway station, Belmore Park, Goulburn, Belmore Falls in the NSW Morton National Park, and the Sydney suburb of Belmore are named after him. A bridge in Maitland, New South Wales is named after him, and there is a road over it, and a hotel nearby, with the same name. There are streets and places named after Earl Belmore around Sydney and NSW ; the name spreads through NSW even after 1872,these would probably be due to copying of the name from one place/construction called Belmore to another.

Political offices
Preceded by Edward Knatchbull-Hugessen	Under-Secretary of State for the Home Department; 1866–1867	Succeeded by Sir James Fergusson, Bt
Preceded by The Earl of Bandon	Representative peer for Ireland; 1857–1913	Succeeded by The Earl of Lanesborough
Government offices
Preceded by Sir John Young, Bt	Governor of New South Wales; 1868–1872	Succeeded by Hercules Robinson
Honorary titles
Preceded by The Earl of Charlemont	Lord Lieutenant of Tyrone; 1892–1913	Succeeded by Edward Archdale
Peerage of Ireland
Preceded by Armar Lowry-Corry	Earl Belmore; 1845–1913	Succeeded by Armar Lowry-Corry
