= Armar Lowry-Corry, 5th Earl Belmore =

Irish noble (1870–1948)

Armar Lowry-Corry
- Earl Belmore
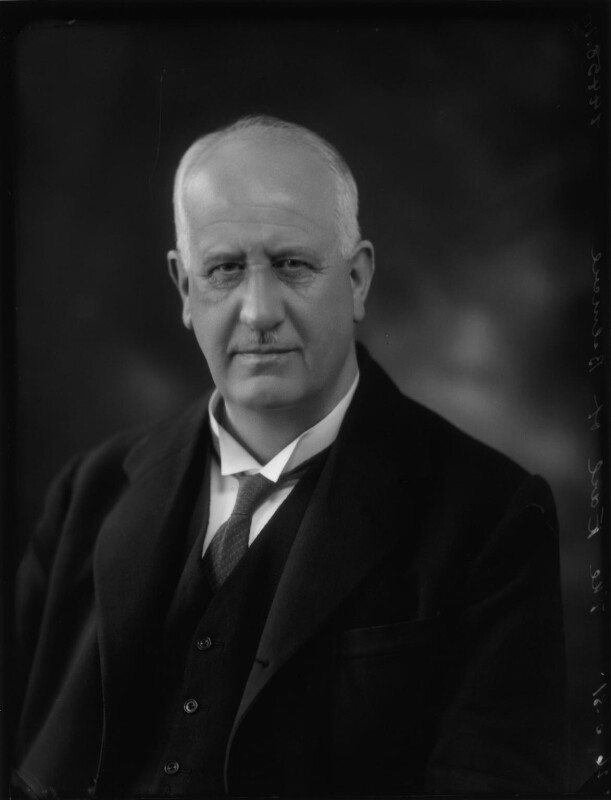
- Predecessor: Somerset Lowry-Corry, 4th Earl Belmore
- Successor: Cecil Lowry-Corry, 6th Earl Belmore
- Born: 5 May 1870; Government House, Sydney
- Died: 12 February 1948 (aged 77)
- Father: Somerset Lowry-Corry
- Mother: Anne Elizabeth Honoria Gladstone

Armar Lowry-Corry, 5th Earl Belmore (5 May 1870 – 12 February 1948) was an Irish nobleman and the eldest son of Somerset Lowry-Corry, 4th Earl Belmore.

== Early years ==
He was born in Government House, Sydney in Australia during his father's term as Governor of New South Wales, baptised in Sydney Cathedral and styled Viscount Corry until he succeeded his father in the earldom in 1913.

== Education ==
From 1881 to 1883 Belmore attended Malvern House Preparatory School, near Dover, then from 1883 to 1887 Winchester College. Before Cambridge, he spent a year at the Rev. A. K. Harlock's school in Brussels, and finally was at Trinity Hall, Cambridge from 1888, where he graduated in 1891. He then trained as a barrister at the Inner Temple and was called to the bar in 1897.

== Castle Coole ==
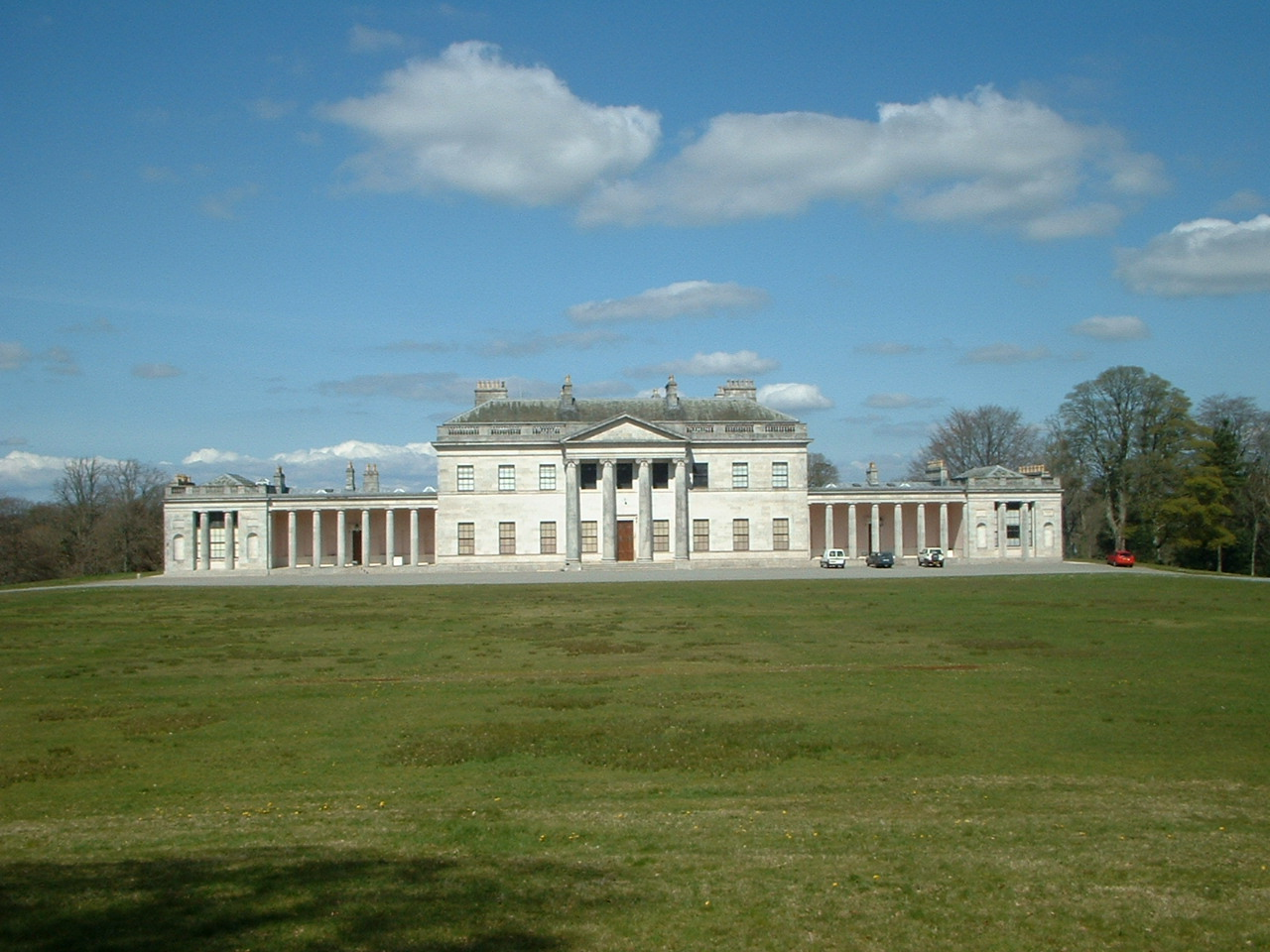
Castle Coole, Co Fermanagh

The 5th Earl gained the rank of captain in the Royal Inniskilling Fusiliers. He held the offices of High Sheriff of County Fermanagh (1895) and High Sheriff of County Tyrone (1901), justice of the peace in County Fermanagh and County Tyrone and a deputy lieutenant of County Fermanagh. He was in charge of the family's ancestral seat, Castle Coole, in County Fermanagh during the Second World War, when all country houses in the county were requisitioned by the armed forces because of the strategic importance of the flying-boat base on Lough Erne.

As Mark Bence-Jones explains, "Lord Belmore, an elderly and autocratic bachelor of elephantine build, tried to keep the military out of his own demesne of Castlecoole (sic), but it was discovered that the place was held originally by a Plantation grant which obliged the grantee to help with the defence of the country. So the authorities declared Castlecoole escheated, giving it back to Lord Belmore when the military left. The military did not, however, go into the house, where Lord Belmore lived on undisturbed. Living with Lord Belmore in that palatial classical mansion overlooking a lake inhabited by a flock of greylag geese were his rather sad bachelor brother and his four unmarried sisters, the Ladies Lowry-Corry, with whom he was not on speaking terms. When Lord Belmore first inherited Castlecoole there were eight unmarried sisters living with him there; since then one had married and three had died – one drowned in the lake and, according to legend, turned into a greylag goose. Lord Belmore and his brother and sisters had always occupied the same places in church, strung out in a line according to age; there were gaps where the deceased Ladies Lowry-Corry had been, for when they died the survivors had not closed ranks."

== Death ==
Lowry-Corry died in Castle Coole, Enniskillen, on 12 February 1948, aged 77. He was succeeded by his only surviving brother.

Peerage of Ireland
Preceded by Somerset Lowry-Corry	Earl Belmore; 1913–1948	Succeeded by Cecil Lowry-Corry
