= Armar Lowry-Corry, 1st Earl Belmore =

Irish nobleman and politician

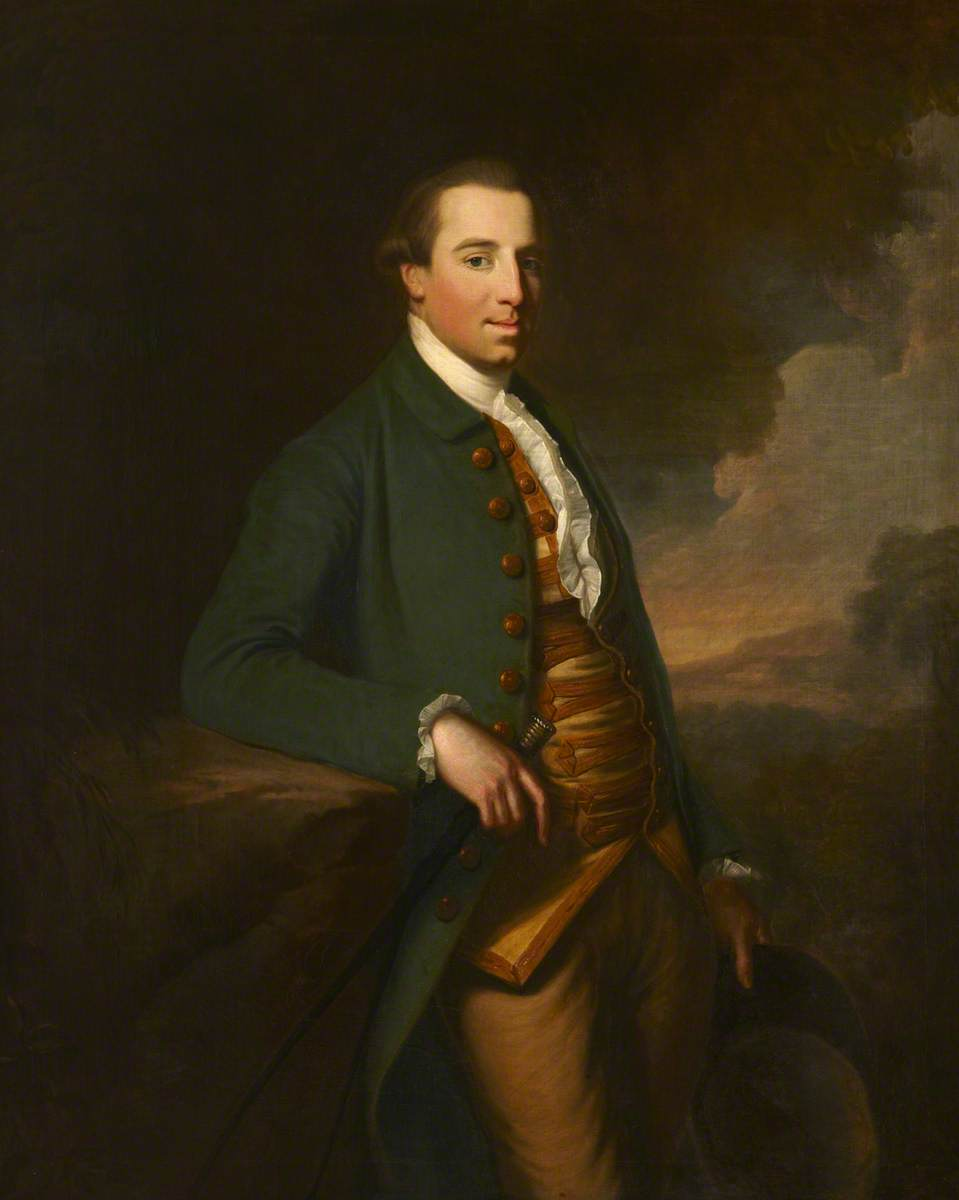
Belmore c.1771, by Robert Hunter

Armar Lowry-Corry, 1st Earl Belmore (7 April 1740 – 2 February 1802) was an Irish nobleman and politician.

== Background ==
He was born Armar Lowry, the first son of Galbraith Lowry (later Lowry-Corry) MP, of Ahenis, County Tyrone by his wife Sarah Corry, second daughter and eventual co-heiress of Colonel John Corry, MP, of Castle Coole, County Fermanagh.

== Public life ==
In 1768, Lowry was elected to the Irish House of Commons for County Tyrone and sat for the constituency until 1781, when he was elevated to the Peerage of Ireland as Baron Belmore, of Castle Coole in the County of Fermanagh. On 6 December 1789 he was further created Viscount Belmore and on 20 November 1797 was created Earl Belmore, in the County of Fermanagh. Lord Belmore was High Sheriff of County Tyrone in 1769 and of County Fermanagh in 1779.

== Castle Coole ==
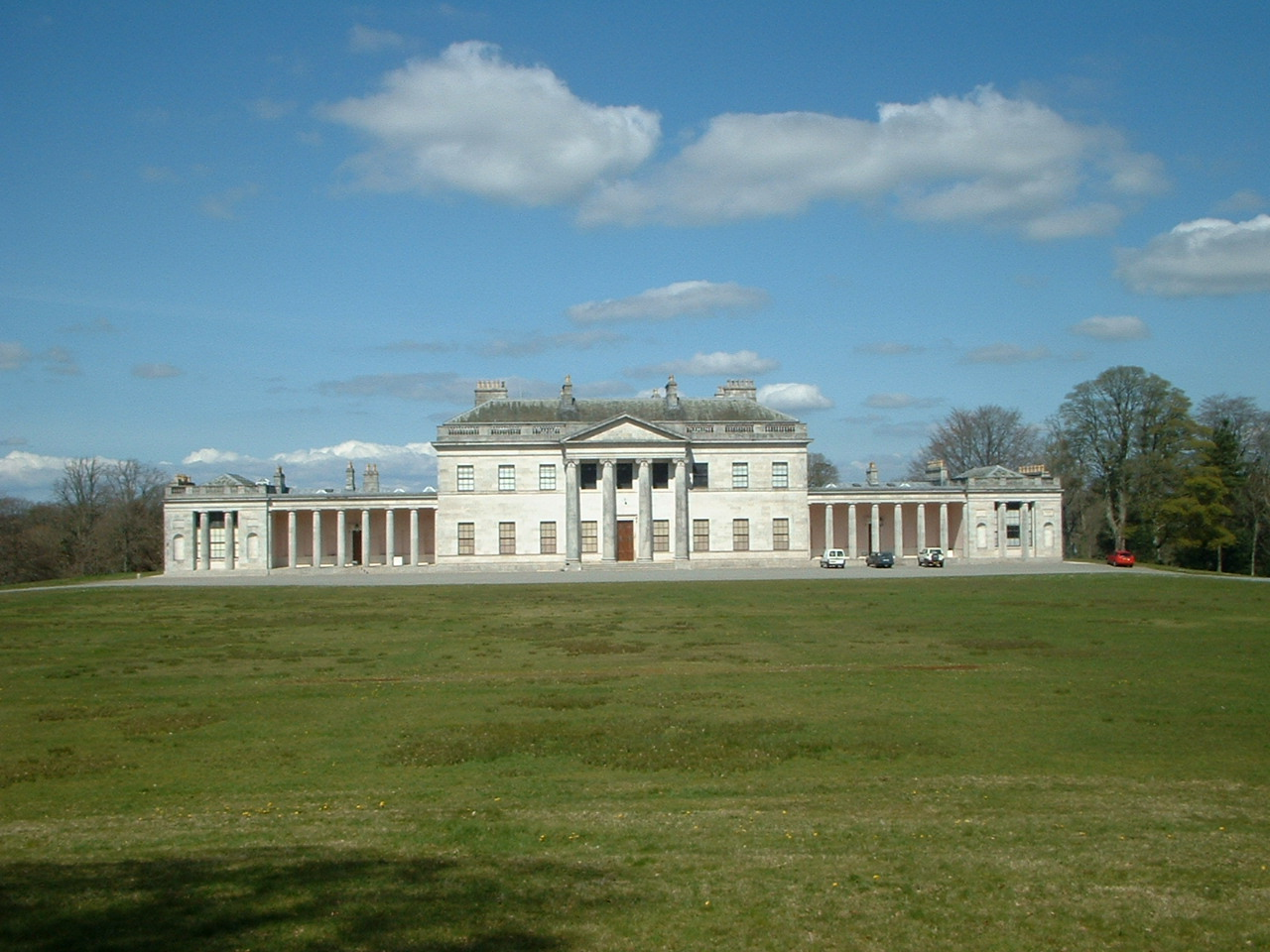
Castle Coole, Co Fermanagh

Lowry inherited the Corry family estate of Castle Coole in 1774, and took the additional name of Corry in recognition of this inheritance. The papers of the Lowry-Corry family show that the earl's political ambitions were a significant factor in the rebuilding of Castle Coole, which is widely regarded as the most palatial Classical 18th century house in Ireland, celebrated as the masterpiece of James Wyatt. In a characteristically incisive introduction to the catalogue of the Belmore papers at the Public Record Office of Northern Ireland, Dr Anthony Malcomson writes:

"Castle Coole was built as part and parcel of Belmore's plans for his own and his family's political and social aggrandisement...it was well-situated to mark the nucleus of a north-western political power bloc in the Irish Parliament...That parliament, its autonomy enhanced by the so-called Constitution of 1782 looked as if it would last forever...Castle Coole therefore reflects Belmore's confidence in his own political future and in the future of the political institutions of the day. It was to be the home of a great Irish political family: not merely a place to live in, but a showpiece to proclaim Belmore's position in Irish society and influence in the Irish House of Commons."

Unfortunately for Lord Belmore that confidence proved to be misplaced. Although he had inherited various family estates totaling some 70,000 acres (280 km^{2}) and with a rent roll of at least £12,000 a year, and had risen through the ranks of the peerage, ultimately the Act of Union 1800 ended his chances of political influence. All that remained of his ambitions was Castle Coole itself, and that was really more a source of satisfaction to posterity than to himself, for he effectively handed over his various properties to his son and heir, Somerset, on his coming-of-age in 1795.

Malcomson writes that by the time of Lord Belmore's death, the total debt affecting his estates stood at £133,000, of which about £70,000 was attributable to the building of Castle Coole, and that while the house was completed within his lifetime, it was not to be fully furnished until his son had inherited the estate.

== Family ==
Lord Belmore was married firstly on 3 October 1771 to Lady Margaret Butler (23 January 1748 - Apr 1775), eldest daughter of Somerset Butler, 1st Earl of Carrick by his wife Lady Juliana Boyle, first daughter by his second wife of Henry Boyle, 1st Earl of Shannon, and had issue:

- Galbraith Lowry-Corry (1772–1773)
- Somerset Lowry-Corry, 2nd Earl Belmore

He was married secondly on 2 March 1780 to Lady Harriet Hobart (7 April 1762 –14 July 1805), eldest daughter and co-heir of John Hobart, 2nd Earl of Buckinghamshire, who was at the time the Lord Lieutenant of Ireland, by his first wife Mary Anne Drury, first daughter and co-heiress of Lieutenant General Sir Thomas Drury, 1st Baronet, of Overstone, and had issue:

- Lady Louisa Mary Anne Julia Harriet Lowry-Corry (3 April 1781 –19 April 1862), who was married to George John Montagu, 6th Earl of Sandwich, and had issue: (i) Lady Harriet Mary Montagu (14 May 1805 – 4 May 1857) and (ii) John William Montagu, 7th Earl of Sandwich (8 November 1811 – 3 March 1884)

Lord Belmore's second marriage was subsequently dissolved by an Act of Parliament in 1793, with Lady Belmore later marrying William Kerr, 6th Marquess of Lothian. He was married for a third time on 1 March 1794 to Mary Anne Caldwell (17 April 1755 –13 December 1841), eldest daughter of Sir John Caldwell, 4th Baronet, of Castle Caldwell, County Fermanagh, by his wife Elizabeth Hort, daughter of the Most Reverend Josiah Hort, Archbishop of Tuam.

Lord Belmore died at Bath on 2 February 1802 aged 61 and was succeeded by his only surviving son.

== Ancestry ==
Ancestors of Armar Lowry-Corry, 1st Earl Belmore

8. John Lowry, Esq of Ahenis, Caledon, Co. Tyrone
4. Robert Lowry, Esq of Ahenis, Caledon, Co. Tyrone
9. Mary Buchanan daughter of James Buchanan
2. Galbraith Lowry
10. Rev. John Sinclair, Esq of Hollyhill house, Co. Tyrone
5. Anna Sinclair
11. Anna Galbraith daughter of James Galbraith, Esq of Mount Gavelin, County Donegal
1. Armar Lowry-Corry, 1st Earl Belmore
12. Colonel James Corry
6. Colonel John Corry
13. Sarah Anketill daughter of Oliver Anketell, Esq of Anketell Grove, County Monaghan
3. Sarah Corry
14. Captain William Leslie, Esq of Prospect, County Antrim
7. Sarah Leslie
15. Mary Elchin daughter of John Elchin, Esq of Ardquin, Co. Down

Parliament of Ireland
Preceded by Richard Gorges; Richard Gorges	Member of Parliament for Enniskillen; 1768–1769; With: Richard Gorges	Succeeded by Richard Gorges; Bernard Smyth Ward
Preceded by Galbraith Lowry-Corry; William Stewart	Member of Parliament for County Tyrone; 1768–1781; With: James Stewart	Succeeded by Nathaniel Montgomery; James Stewart
Peerage of Ireland
New creation	Earl Belmore; 1797–1802	Succeeded by Somerset Lowry-Corry
New creation	Viscount Belmore; 1789–1802	Succeeded by Somerset Lowry-Corry
New creation	Baron Belmore; 1781–1802	Succeeded by Somerset Lowry-Corry
