= Cecil Lowry-Corry, 6th Earl Belmore =

English nobleman (1873–1949)

Cecil Lowry-Corry
- 6th Earl Belmore
- Predecessor: Armar Lowry-Corry, 5th Earl Belmore
- Successor: Galbraith Lowry-Corry, 7th Earl Belmore
- Born: Cecil Lowry-Corry; 20 March 1873
- Died: 2 March 1949 (aged 75)
- Noble family: Lowry-Corry
- Father: Somerset Lowry-Corry, 4th Earl Belmore

Cecil Lowry-Corry, 6th Earl Belmore (20 March 1873 – 2 March 1949) was the son of Somerset Lowry-Corry, 4th Earl Belmore and the brother of Armar Lowry-Corry, 5th Earl Belmore.

== Career ==
Educated at Wellington College, Lowry-Corry held the offices of justice of the peace for County Tyrone and County Fermanagh, deputy lieutenant of County Fermanagh.

Lowry-Corry also served as the High Sheriff of County Tyrone in 1916 and High Sheriff of County Fermanagh in 1922. He was also chairman of Fermanagh County Council from 1943 and then of Enniskillen Rural District Council. He was also a member of the General Synod of the Church of Ireland and honorary secretary of the Clogher Diocesan Fund.

== Earl Belmore ==
He succeeded to the title on 12 February 1948 on the death of his brother, but died just over a year later, on 2 March 1949, aged 76, being succeeded by his cousin, Galbraith Lowry-Corry, 7th Earl Belmore.

Peerage of Ireland
Preceded by Armar Lowry-Corry	Earl Belmore; 1948–1949	Succeeded by Galbraith Lowry-Corry
