= Somerset Lowry-Corry, 2nd Earl Belmore =

Irish nobleman and politician (1774–1841)

The Right Honourable The Earl Belmore
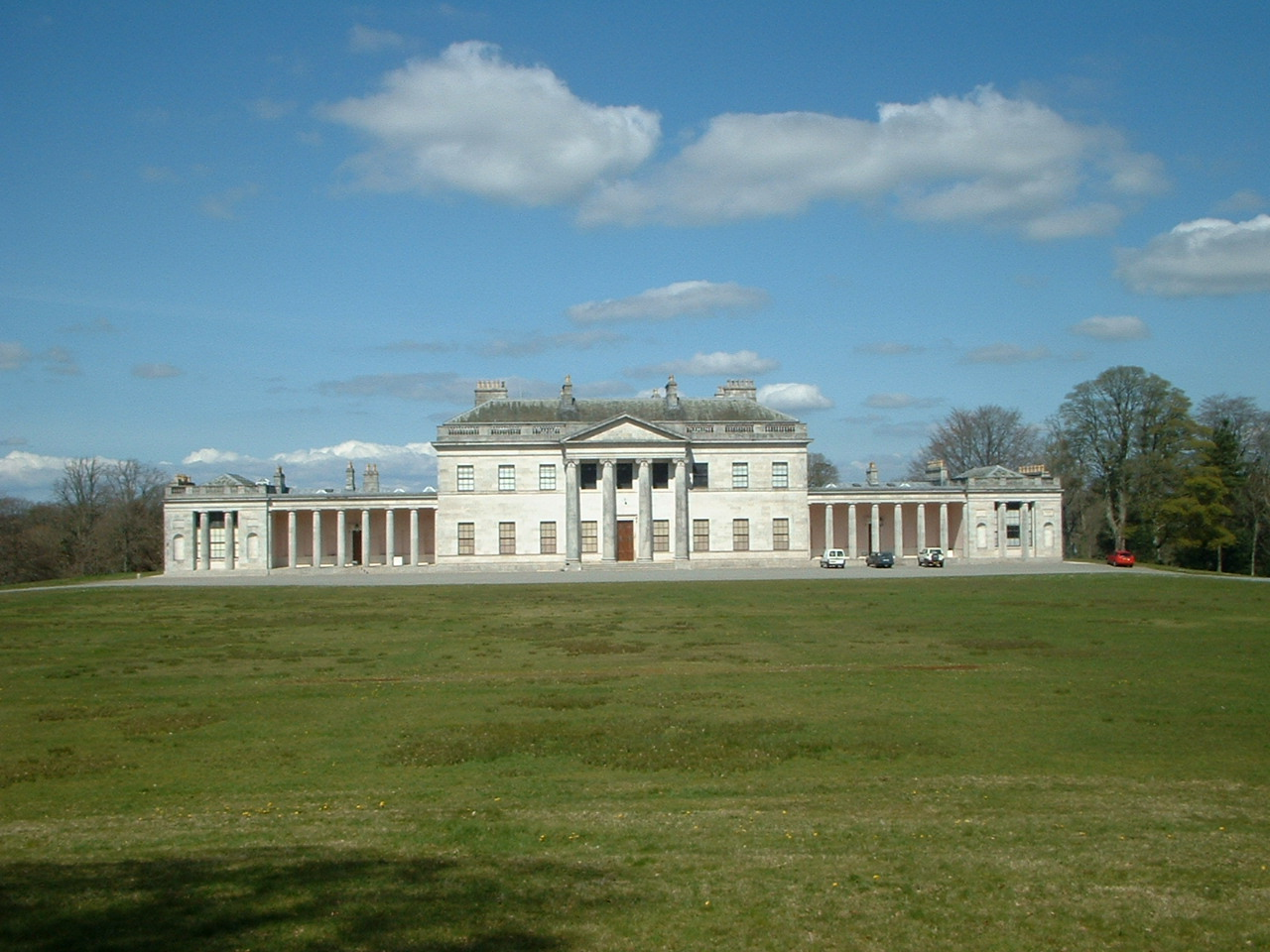
- Castle Coole in County Fermanagh

Member of the Dublin Parliament for Ballyshannon
- In office 1798–1798 Serving with David Babington
- Preceded by: Sir Michael Cromie, 1st Bt; Thomas Dickson
- Succeeded by: David Babington; Sir William Richardson, 1st Bt

Member of the Dublin Parliament for County Tyrone
- In office 1798–1801 Serving with James Stewart
- Preceded by: Thomas Knox; James Stewart
- Succeeded by: Parliament of the United Kingdom

Member of the British Parliament for County Tyrone
- In office 1801–1802 Serving with James Stewart
- Preceded by: New constituency
- Succeeded by: James Stewart; John Stewart

Governor of Jamaica
- In office 1828–1832
- Monarchs: George IV; William IV
- Preceded by: Sir John Keane (acting)
- Succeeded by: George Cuthbert (acting)

Personal details
- Born: 11 July 1774
- Died: 18 April 1841 (aged 66) Leamington Spa, Warwickshire, England
- Children: Armar Lowry-Corry, 3rd Earl Belmore; Henry Thomas Lowry-Corry
- Parent: Armar Lowry-Corry, 1st Earl Belmore (father)

Somerset Lowry-Corry, 2nd Earl Belmore (11 July 1774 – 18 April 1841), styled The Honourable from 1781 to 1797 and then known as Viscount Corry until 1802, was an Irish nobleman and politician.

== Politics and inheritance ==
Lowry-Corry was the only surviving son of Armar Lowry-Corry, 1st Earl Belmore, and his first wife Lady Margaret Butler. In 1798, he was elected to the Irish House of Commons for County Tyrone and represented the constituency until the Act of Union in 1801. Thereafter he was returned to the British House of Commons for County Tyrone, a seat he held until 1802, when he succeeded his father as earl.

In 1819 Lord Belmore was appointed Custos Rotulorum of Tyrone and elected as an Irish representative peer. He served as Governor of Jamaica from 1828 to 1832 and was also Colonel of the Royal Tyrone Militia from November 1798 until 1804.

He inherited from his father the house at Castle Coole in County Fermanagh, along with considerable debts. Nonetheless, he furnished the house and its classical interiors designed by James Wyatt in an exuberant Regency fashion between 1802 and 1825. Elaborate curtains and pelmets, pier glasses, "Grecian" couches and a magnificent state bed designed to accommodate King George IV on his state visit to Ireland in 1821 (although the king did not make it as far as Castle Coole, much to the disappointment of the earl) were all supplied by the Dublin upholsterer John Preston at a total cost of around £35,000. Lord Belmore also commissioned Sir Richard Morrison to build a new stable block in 1817.

== Lord Belmore's yacht ==
Lord Belmore bought the captured James Madison and had her converted from schooner to brig rig. He also renamed her Osprey, of Killybegs in County Donegal, armed her with fourteen 9-pounder carronades, and arranged for her to have a letter of marque.

Around 1817, Lord Belmore used Osprey for a family cruise to the Eastern Mediterranean. Her captain was Lord Belmore's brother, Captain Armar Lowry-Corry, RN. The party included Belmore's wife, the Countess Juliana, their two sons, their lapdog Rosa, the family doctor, Dr. Robert Richardson, M.D. (Edinburgh), and the vicar, Mr. Holt. They visited Malta, Sicily, Italy, the Ionian Islands, Greece, Rome, and Alexandria. They also sailed up the Nile as far as Luxor in three local boats.

Lord Belmore apparently had two hobbies in Egypt. One was collecting antiquities. To that end he sponsored some of Giovanni Battista Belzoni's excavations in Egypt with the result that tomb KV30, in the Valley of the Kings, is known as Lord Belmore's tomb. These excavations were the source of some of Lord Belmore's collection of Egyptian antiquities, such as the sarcophagus that is now in the British Museum.

Lord Belmore's other hobby was carving his name on Egyptian antiquities. In his desire to commemorate his travels, Belmore carved his name into a stone at the top of the Great Pyramid of Giza, the Ramesseum (the mortuary temple of Ramses II), and on the side of the Temple of Dendur, which is now in the Metropolitan Museum of Art in New York. Corry also carved his name on a pillar of the temple of Medinet Habu at Luxor. After Egypt, the family traveled to Palestine and visited Jerusalem.

In 1819 when the family was done with their cruise, Belmore sold Osprey to the King of Naples and the family returned home.

== Family ==
On 20 October 1800 Somerset married his first cousin Lady Juliana Butler (20 September 1783 –22 July 1861), second daughter of Henry Butler, 2nd Earl of Carrick by his wife Sarah Taylor, second daughter and co-heiress of Edward Taylor, of Askeaton, County Limerick, and had issue:

- Armar Lowry-Corry, 3rd Earl Belmore
- Hon. Henry Thomas Lowry-Corry (9 March 1803 –5 March 1873), who was married on 18 March 1830 to Lady Harriet Anne Cooper (d. 25 March 1868), second daughter of Cropley Ashley-Cooper, 6th Earl of Shaftesbury, by his wife Lady Anne Spencer, fourth daughter of George Spencer, 4th Duke of Marlborough, and had issue
- Lady Sarah Lowry-Corry (d.v.p. 1806)

Lord Belmore died at Leamington Spa, Warwickshire on 18 April 1841 aged sixty-six and was succeeded by his eldest son.

== Ancestry ==
Ancestors of Somerset Lowry-Corry, 2nd Earl Belmore

8. Robert Lowry, Esq of Ahenis, Caledon, Co. Tyrone
4. Galbraith Corry
9. Anne Sinclair daughter of Rev. John Sinclair, Esq of Hollyhill house, Co. Tyrone
2. Armar Lowry-Corry, 1st Earl Belmore
10. Colonel John Corry
5. Sarah Lowry
11. Sarah Leslie daughter of Captain William Leslie, Esq of Prospect, County Antrim
1. Somerset Lowry-Corry, 2nd Earl Belmore
12. Thomas Butler, 6th Viscount Ikerrin
6. Somerset Butler, 1st Earl of Carrick
13. Margaret Hamilton daughter of James Hamilton, Esq of Bangor, County Down
3. Lady Margaret Butler
14. Henry Boyle, 1st Earl of Shannon
7. Lady Juliana Boyle
15. Lady Henrietta Boyle daughter of Charles Boyle, 2nd Earl of Burlington

== Notes ==
Parliament of Ireland
Preceded by Sir Michael Cromie, 1st Bt; Thomas Dickson	Member of Parliament for Ballyshannon; 1798; With: David Babington	Succeeded by David Babington; Sir William Richardson, 1st Bt
Preceded by Hon. Thomas Knox; James Stewart	Member of Parliament for County Tyrone; 1798–1801; With: James Stewart	Succeeded by Parliament of the United Kingdom
Parliament of the United Kingdom
New constituency	Member of Parliament for County Tyrone; 1801–1802; With: James Stewart	Succeeded by James Stewart; John Stewart
Political offices
Preceded by The Earl of Glengall	Representative peer for Ireland; 1819–1841	Succeeded by The Lord Castlemaine
Government offices
Preceded by Sir John Keane (acting)	Governor of Jamaica; 1828–1832	Succeeded by George Cuthbert (acting)
Peerage of Ireland
Preceded by Armar Lowry-Corry	Earl Belmore; 1802–1841	Succeeded by Armar Lowry-Corry
