= Castle Coole =

Historic mansion in Northern Ireland

Coordinates: 54.3362°N 7.6241°W

Castle Coole: Irish: Caisleán na Cúile
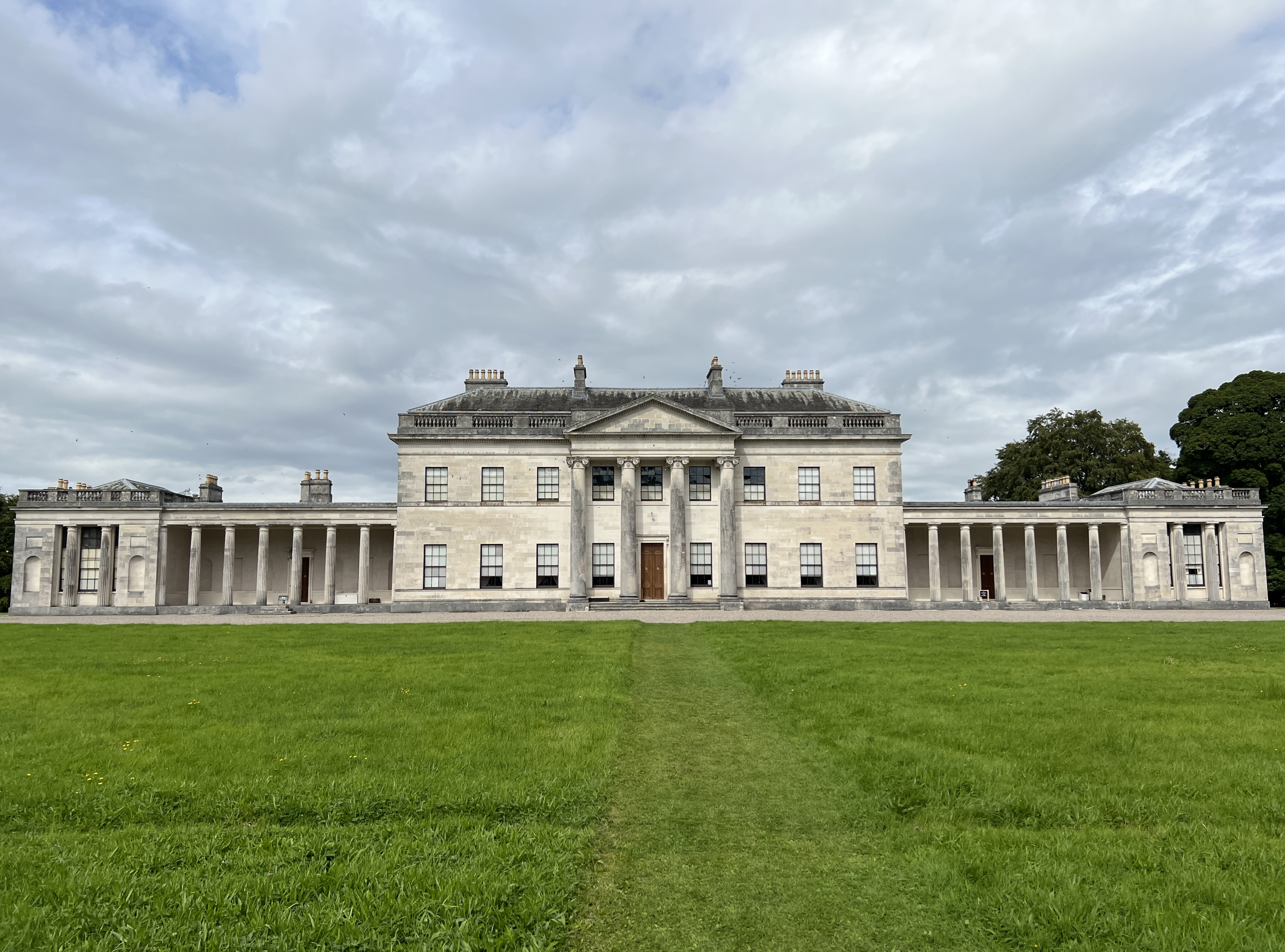
- Main facade of Castle Coole

- Location within Northern Ireland
- District: Fermanagh and Omagh
- County: County Fermanagh
- Country: Northern Ireland
- Sovereign state: United Kingdom
- Postcode district: BT
- Dialling code: 028, +44 28
- UK Parliament: Fermanagh and South Tyrone
- NI Assembly: Fermanagh and South Tyrone

Castle Coole (from Irish: Cúl) is a townland and a late-18th-century neo-classical mansion situated in Enniskillen, County Fermanagh, Northern Ireland. Set in a 1,200-acre (490 ha) wooded estate, it is one of three properties owned and managed by the National Trust in County Fermanagh, the others being Florence Court and the Crom Estate.

The townland, which is 529 acres (214 ha) in size, is situated in the civil parish of Derryvullan, in the historic barony of Tirkennedy, as well as Fermanagh and Omagh district.

== History ==
The Castle Coole estate was purchased in 1656 by the Belfast merchant John Corry, grandfather of the 1st Earl Belmore. The estate is named for Lough Coole (from Irish Gaelic cúil, 'seclusion'), a lake surrounded by the Killynure hills. A ráth here and a crannog in Lough Coole itself are reminders that the area has been settled since prehistoric times. Other lakes on the estate include Lough Yoan and Brendrum Lough. The site of a 17th-century house and bawn and formal garden at Castle Coole (grid ref: H2574 4333) are Scheduled Historic Monuments.

Castle Coole was constructed between 1789 and 1798 as the summer retreat of Armar Lowry-Corry, 1st Earl Belmore. Lord Belmore was the Member of Parliament for County Tyrone in the former Irish House of Commons in Dublin and a wealthy heir to 70,000 acres (28,000 ha) of land throughout Ireland, acquired by ancestors with a successful background in merchantry. The income generated by the estates allowed Castle Coole to be constructed at a cost of £57,000 in 1798, equivalent to approximately £9,360,154.99 today million today.

The siting on the comparatively small 1,200-acre (490 ha) estate in County Fermanagh was primarily due to its unspoilt rural location and natural environment amongst ancient oak woodland and small lakes, yet with proximity to the market town of Enniskillen for the domestic labour necessary for a large mansion. Additionally, several smaller family residences had been built on the Castle Coole estate preceding the mansion, including a dwelling of the King James period (later deliberately destroyed by fire) and a Queen Anne house built in 1709. Following the passage in 1800 of the Act of Union, the law politically uniting Britain and Ireland, the family moved from their main residence – a small townhouse in Sackville Street, Dublin – to Castle Coole, as the reason for living in Dublin, to be close to the Parliament, no longer applied.

In 1951 Galbraith Lowry-Corry, 7th Earl Belmore transferred the mansion to the National Trust, prompted by two sets of death duties or inheritance tax when Armar Lowry-Corry, 5th Earl Belmore and Cecil Lowry-Corry, 6th Earl Belmore died without issue 18 months apart. However, the contents of the mansion, including much that is today shown to visitors, remain the Earl Belmore's property. The National Trust opens the mansion to visitors during the summer months, and the estate can be visited year-round.

Between 1980 and 1988, the mansion was closed to the public while the National Trust undertook major restoration work, including the dismantling the façade to replace metal anchors that hold the stone in place as these were corroding. To celebrate the re-opening, the Queen Mother was invited to Castle Coole. As part of the transfer of ownership to the National Trust, there is an agreement that the Earl Belmore retains use of an apartment in the S wing.

== Architecture ==
Neo-classical in architectural style, Castle Coole was the work of two Georgian period architects who did not collaborate. Richard Johnston, an Irish architect, was initially commissioned and completed the basement. Johnston was dismissed in favour of the popular and fashionable English architect James Wyatt, who, rather than starting afresh, began where Johnston left off and completed the mansion on the same footprint. Wyatt adhered closely to the Neo-classical ideal of restraint, symmetry and meticulous proportions, with architectural features carefully scaled. An Ionic portico and flanking Doric colonnaded wings extend either end of the main block of the house. Wyatt probably never visited the site and sent drawings for the house from London. The varied plaster ceilings were all the work of the English artist Joseph Rose.

Notable aspects of the mansion include the Portland stone façades and sober portico with Ionic capitals. Inside, the entrance hall has four large scagliola columns. A double-return cantilever staircase leads to an unusual double-height saloon at first floor that rises up a further floor with a bedroom gallery overlooking. Both spaces are decorated with Doric columns in scagliola of diminishing scale from lower to higher.

Wyatt also designed some of the furniture in the mansion. Such architect-designed Neo-classical pieces still in the situation for which they are designed are rare, much of their aesthetic value arising from their surviving in the original location. Other furniture was placed by the second Earl, when the Regency style was in vogue and by later generations, so that the interior appearance today is many layered, not just neo-classical.

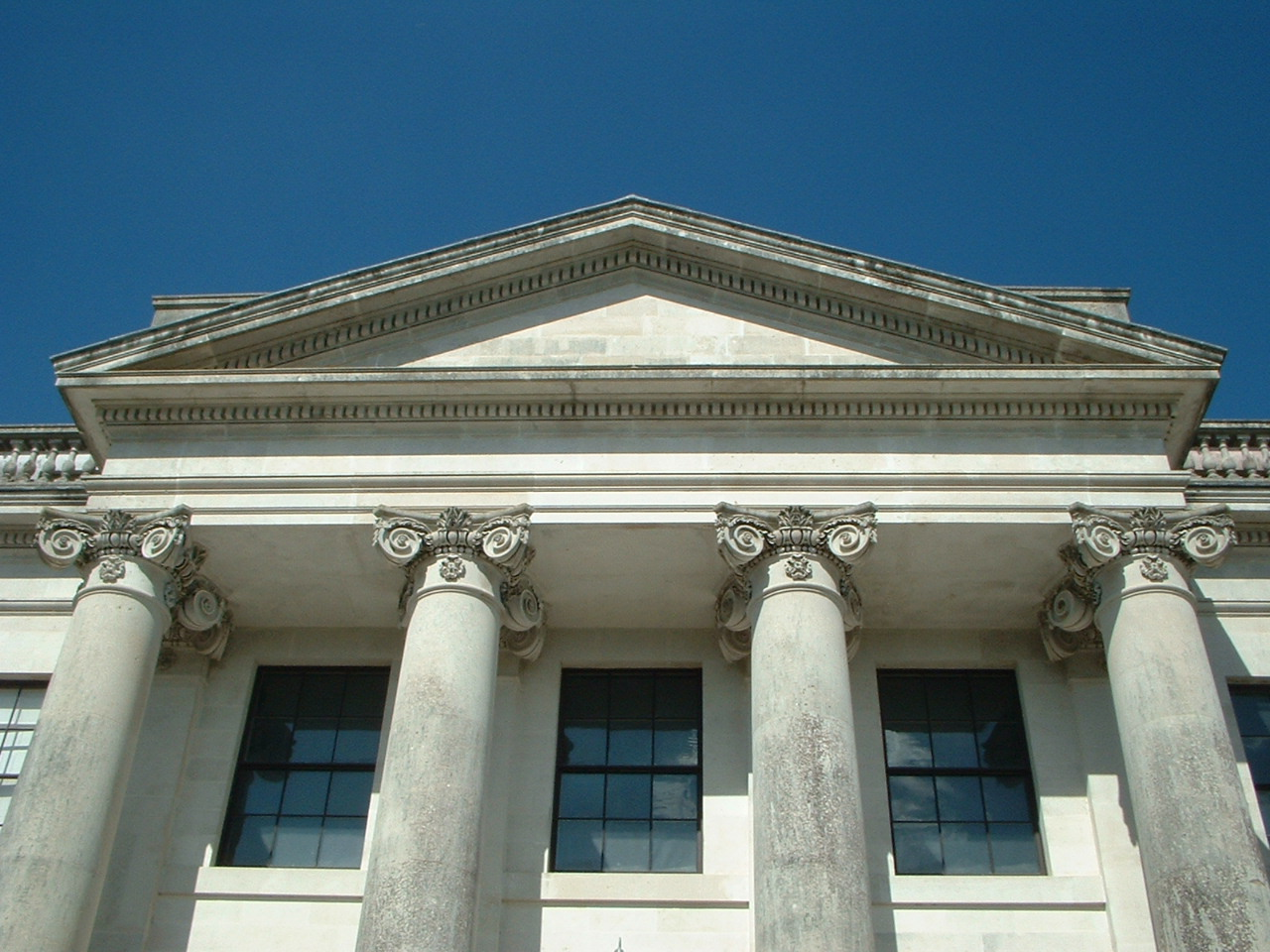
Detail of Castle Coole portico, with bold capitals on Ionic columns

A state bedroom, prepared in 1821 for King George IV (un-used by the King, who failed to arrive), retains original furnishings, state bed and flock wallpaper. A drawing room furnished in a French Empire style, a Grecian staircase hall, and a ladies' workroom furnished in a Chinese style reflect the importance of worldly knowledge and awareness during the Regency period. Family motifs, engraved into Italian marble chimneypieces and adorning the plaster frieze of the Entrance Hall, reflect the 1st Earl's pride in his family heritage. The rooms to the mansion's garden front have views of Lough Coole.

There is a basement under the house which extends some way under the adjacent northwest lawns. This below-ground area is partially restored and open to the public and contains kitchens, servants' hall, larders, wine-cellars, laundry, a Roman style plunge-bath, a brewery and other offices. Castle Coole has no above-ground service door. Wyatt sought to give the impression—often sought by Neo-classical architects—of a perfect composition on ancient proportional principles, isolated in a "natural" landscape. Externally, the practical offices supporting the house are all accessed by a long inclined tunnel from the stable yard 260 feet (80 m) away, so that tradesmen, servants and estate staff approached and left the house unseen, with the architect's Neo-classical ideal composition above ground left seemingly undisturbed by day-to-day business. Out-buildings on the estate include lodges, a "Grand Yard", workshops, stables, and a "Tallow House" (originally used for candle-making, now a gift shop and reception area).

== Estate ==
Much of the native oak, ash and beech planting of the landscape park remains, today grazed by cattle and sheep as originally intended. A considerable portion of the estate has been historically given over to agriculture and let to local farmers, a practice which continues today. A part to the South West has been taken by the Enniskillen Golf Club and here the original planting is compromised by modern golf course design. To the South East, part of the estate was sold off for the Killyevlin Industrial Estate.

A 'ha-ha' – that is a ditch to control livestock movements without visual interruption to the landscape resulting from a fence or a wall – can be found near the mansion. Vestigial remains of the earlier extensive parterres of the earlier Baroque house can be seen in the park, but are difficult to discern today, in spite of interpretation panels installed by the National Trust.

== Family ==
The Belmore earldom is named after the nearby Belmore Mountain, 7 miles (11 km) west of Enniskillen. Corry had hoped to be named Earl of Enniskillen, until this title was given to the Cole family at Florence Court. Though the origins of the Corry side of the family can be found in Belfast, there is more uncertainty with the Lowry side. The Lowrys may originally have been from Dumfries in Scotland.

As a member of the peerage of Ireland, the earl of Belmore had a seat in the Irish House of Lords until it was abolished in 1801 when the Kingdom of Ireland was merged into the United Kingdom. Somerset Lowry-Corry, 2nd Earl Belmore and Somerset Lowry-Corry, 4th Earl Belmore subsequently sat in the House of Lords at Westminster as Irish representative peers.

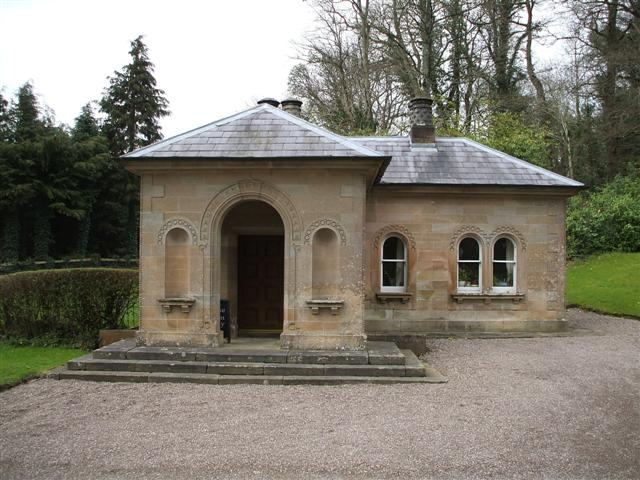
Gate lodge at the entrance to the estate

== Re-opening in 2006 ==
Castle Coole re-opened to the public for the 2006 season on 17 March. A re-design of the Victorian Bedroom layout now commemorates four years of Australian influence at Castle Coole. Somerset Lowry-Corry, 4th Earl Belmore, became the Governor of New South Wales on 8 January 1868 and served until 23 February 1872. At Government House, Sydney, the 4th Earl's first son was born on 1 May 1870, later to become the 5th Earl Belmore. Lady Belmore found the summer climate of Sydney oppressive and despite frequent retreats to Moss Vale, concern over his wife's health prompted the Lord Belmore to resign his governorship on 26 June 1871 allowing the Belmore family to return to Castle Coole the following year.

Admission to Castle Coole is by guided tour only.

== See also ==
- List of townlands of County Fermanagh
- Cobbe family

== Bibliography ==
- Marsen, P (1997) 'The Belmores at Castle Coole 1740–1913' Enniskillen: Print Factory (not in print)
- Room, A (1994) 'A Dictionary of Irish Place Names' Belfast: Appletree Press. ISBN 0-86281-460-X
- Unpublished material relating to Castle Coole at Castle Coole in possession of the National Trust
