= 1953 in Northern Ireland =

- Centuries: 20th; 21st
- Decades: 1930s; 1940s; 1950s; 1960s; 1970s
- See also: 1953 in the United Kingdom; 1953 in Ireland; Other events of 1953; List of years in Northern Ireland

Events during the year 1953 in Northern Ireland.

== Incumbents ==
- Governor - The Lord Wakehurst
- Prime Minister - Basil Brooke

== Events ==
The Flag of the Government of Northern Ireland is first used, to mark the coronation of Queen Elizabeth II

- 31 January – The car ferry MV Princess Victoria sailing from Stranraer, Scotland to Larne, Northern Ireland, sinks in the Irish Sea killing 133 people on board. The dead include Northern Ireland Finance Minister and Deputy Prime Minister Major Maynard Sinclair and Sir Walter Smiles, the Ulster Unionist MP for North Down.
- 16 March – Franklin Delano Roosevelt, Jr. asks the American Congress to support a United Ireland.
- 1 May – The BBC brings into service the first television transmitter in Northern Ireland, at Glencairn (Belfast), to improve coverage prior to broadcast of the Coronation of Queen Elizabeth II a month later.
- 1–3 July - First visit of Elizabeth II to Northern Ireland following her accession.
- 2 August – Murlough Bay in the Antrim Glens is chosen as the future grave of Roger Casement. Taoiseach Éamon de Valera calls for the return of his remains.
- Saor Uladh, a criminal Republican paramilitary organisation, is formed in County Tyrone by Liam Kelly (who had been expelled from the Irish Republican Army in 1951) and Phil O'Donnell.

== Sport ==
=== Football ===
- Irish League

Winners: Glentoran

- Irish Cup

Winners: Linfield 5 - 0 Coleraine
- George Wilson Cup (Inaugural)
- Winners: Crusaders Reserves

=== Gaelic Games ===
- June - Casement Park in Belfast is opened, home to the Antrim football and hurling teams.

=== Golf ===
- Fred Daly plays in the Ryder Cup.

=== Motorcycling ===
- Ulster Grand Prix moves to current Dundrod circuit.

== Births ==
=== January to June ===
- 23 January – Alister McGrath, Christian theologian, currently Professor of Historical Theology at the University of Oxford.
- 9 February – Ciarán Hinds, actor.
- 9 February – George Ennis, UK Unionist Party MLA.
- 15 February – Gregory Campbell, Democratic Unionist Party MP for East Londonderry.
- 2 April – Jim Allister, Democratic Unionist Party MEP and a QC.
- 4 April – Sammy Wilson, Democratic Unionist Party MP for East Antrim, member of the Northern Ireland Assembly.
- 5 April – Gerry Kelly, Sinn Féin MLA for Belfast North.
- 6 June – Maggie Shevlin, actress.

=== July to December ===
- 21 July – David Ervine, leader of the Progressive Unionist Party (died 2007).
- 6 August – Jamie Delargy, television journalist.
- 21 October – Peter Mandelson, 12th Secretary of State for Northern Ireland and European Commissioner.
- 4 December – Paul Clark, television presenter and journalist.

=== Full date unknown ===
- Gordy Blair, bass guitarist.
- Danny Morrison, Irish republican and writer.
- Gearóid Ó hEára, Sinn Féin politician and former Mayor of Derry.
- David Park, novelist.

== Deaths ==
- 12 September – James Hamilton, 3rd Duke of Abercorn, Unionist politician and first Governor of Northern Ireland (born 1869).
- Alice Milligan, nationalist and poet (born 1865).
- Louisa Watson Peat, writer and lecturer in the United States (born 1883)

== See also ==
- 1953 in Scotland
- 1953 in Wales
