= 1949 in Northern Ireland =

- Centuries: 20th; 21st
- Decades: 1920s; 1930s; 1940s; 1950s; 1960s
- See also: 1949 in the United Kingdom; 1949 in Ireland; Other events of 1949; List of years in Northern Ireland

Events during the year 1949 in Northern Ireland.

== Incumbents ==
- Governor - Earl Granville
- Prime Minister - Basil Brooke

== Events ==
- 17 April – At midnight 26 counties officially leave the British Commonwealth under terms of the Republic of Ireland Act 1948. A 21-gun salute on O'Connell Bridge, Dublin, ushers in the Republic of Ireland.
- 3 May – The Parliament of the United Kingdom passes the Ireland Act guaranteeing the position of Northern Ireland as part of the United Kingdom as long as a majority of its citizens want it to be. The government also recognises the existence of the Republic of Ireland.
- 10 May – An Oireachtas motion calls a "Protest Against Partition" because of the UK's Ireland Act provisions.
- 13 May – John A. Costello, Éamon de Valera, William Norton and Seán MacBride share a platform to protest the British government's attitude to the constitutional status of Northern Ireland.
- 25 May – The Princess Elizabeth and The Duke of Edinburgh receive the freedom of Belfast during a visit to the city.
- 8 November – Street names in any language other than English are prohibited by an Amendment to a Bill passed in the Senate of Northern Ireland.

== Arts and literature ==
- 13 May – Family radio sitcom The McCooeys written by Joseph Tomelty is first broadcast on the BBC Home Service in Northern Ireland.
- Daniel O'Neill paints Place du Tertre and The Blue Skirt.

== Sport ==
=== Football ===
- Irish League

Winners: Linfield

- Irish Cup

Winners: Derry City 1–0 Glentoran

- Belfast Celtic withdrew from the Irish League at the end of a season which had seen crowd trouble at a match against Linfield five months earlier.

=== Golf ===
- Fred Daly plays in the Ryder Cup.

== Births ==
- 14 January – Donovan McClelland, Social Democratic and Labour Party politician.
- 25 January – Tom Paulin, poet and critic.
- 23 February – Christopher Harte, cricketer.

1 March- Seamus Finnegan, playwright

- 17 March – Pat Rice, footballer and football coach.
- 18 March – Alex Higgins, snooker player.
- 21 March – Pat Finucane, solicitor (killed by loyalist paramilitaries 1989).
- 1 April – Sammy Nelson, footballer.
- 8 April – Graham Crothers, cricketer.
- 6 August – Alan Campbell, Pentecostal pastor.
- 1 September – Alasdair McDonnell, Social Democratic and Labour Party MP and MLA.
- 6 September – Iris Robinson, Democratic Unionist Party MP for Strangford and member of the Northern Ireland Assembly.
- 18 September – Mo Mowlam, English-born 11th British Secretary of State for Northern Ireland (died 2005).
- Full date unknown – David McKittrick, journalist and writer.

== Deaths ==
- 2 March – Cecil Lowry-Corry, 6th Earl Belmore, High Sheriff and councillor (born 1873).
- 2 August – William Lyle, Ulster Unionist Party member of the House of Commons of Northern Ireland for Queen's University Belfast and medical practitioner (born 1871).
- 19 September – George Shiels, dramatist (born 1886).
- 6 October – Robert Wilson Lynd, writer (born 1879).

== See also ==
- 1949 in Scotland
- 1949 in Wales
