= 1947 in Northern Ireland =

- Centuries: 20th; 21st
- Decades: 1920s; 1930s; 1940s; 1950s; 1960s
- See also: 1947 in the United Kingdom; 1947 in Ireland; Other events of 1947; List of years in Northern Ireland

Events during the year 1947 in Northern Ireland.

== Incumbents ==
- Governor - Earl Granville
- Prime Minister - Basil Brooke

== Events ==
- Winter–May/June – The "bad winter" sees snow reach heights of 30 feet at its peak.
- 22 April – British Royal Navy aircraft carrier HMS Centaur (R06) (laid down 1944) is launched at the Harland and Wolff shipyard in Belfast.
- 11 August – The Enterprise express train service commences between Belfast and Dublin.

== Sport ==
=== Football ===
- Irish League

Winners: Belfast Celtic

- Irish Cup

Winners: Belfast Celtic 1 – 0 Glentoran

=== GAA ===
- Cavan defeat Antrim 3-04 to 1–06 to win the Ulster Senior Football Championship.
- Cavan subsequently defeat Kerry 2–11 to 2–07 in New York City to win the All-Ireland Senior Football Championship.

=== Golf ===
- Fred Daly wins The Open Championship at the Royal Liverpool Golf Club, Hoylake.
- Fred Daly plays in the Ryder Cup.

=== Swimming ===
- 27–28 July – English endurance swimmer Tom Blower becomes the first person to swim the North Channel, from Donaghadee in County Down to Portpatrick in Scotland.

== Births ==
- 23 February – Ken Goodall, international rugby player (died 2006).
- 5 March – Clodagh Rodgers, singer (died 2025).
- 24 March – John Dallat, Social Democratic and Labour Party politician (died 2020).
- 23 April – Bernadette Devlin McAliskey, Member of UK Parliament.
- 8 May (in Scotland) – Dr John Reid, 13th Secretary of State for Northern Ireland and Home Secretary.
- 18 May – Eileen Pollock, actress (died 2020).
- 19 May – Paul Brady, singer-songwriter.
- 29 June – Eric Wrixon, rock musician (died 2015).
- 12 August – Seamus Close, Alliance Party MLA (died 2019).
- 3 September – Eric Bell, rock guitarist.
- 14 September – Sam Neill, actor (died 2026).
- 26 October – Sir Reg Empey, leader of the Ulster Unionist Party, member of the Northern Ireland Assembly.
- 2 November – Joe McCann, Official Irish Republican Army volunteer (killed by British soldiers 1972).
- 5 December – Seán Quinn, businessman.
- Full date unknown
  - Paul Haller, Soto Zen Buddhist teacher and Abbot of the San Francisco Zen Center.
  - Eugene McMenamin, SDLP MLA.
  - Frank Ormsby, poet.

== Deaths ==
- 2 January – Tom Ross, cricketer (born 1872).
- 4 January – Forrest Reid, novelist and literary critic (born 1875).
- 25 April – Richard Rowley, poet and writer (born 1877).

== See also ==
- 1947 in Scotland
- 1947 in Wales
