= 1956 in Northern Ireland =

- Centuries: 20th; 21st
- Decades: 1930s; 1940s; 1950s; 1960s; 1970s
- See also: 1956 in the United Kingdom; 1956 in Ireland; Other events of 1956; List of years in Northern Ireland

Events during the year 1956 in Northern Ireland.

== Incumbents ==
- Governor - The Lord Wakehurst
- Prime Minister - Basil Brooke

== Events ==
- 12 December – The Irish Republican Army launches its Border Campaign with the bombing of a BBC relay transmitter in County Londonderry, burning of a courthouse in Magherafelt by a unit led by 18-year-old Seamus Costello and of an Ulster Special Constabulary post near Newry and blowing up of a half-built British Army barracks at Enniskillen. A raid on Gough Barracks in Armagh is beaten off after a brief exchange of fire.
- 14 December – Border Campaign: An IRA column under Seán Garland detonates bombs outside Lisnaskea Royal Ulster Constabulary station before raking it with gunfire. Further attacks on Derrylin and Roslea RUC barracks are beaten off.
- 21 December – The Government of Northern Ireland under Basil Brooke uses the Special Powers Act to intern several hundred republican suspects without trial.
- 30 December – Border Campaign: The IRA Teeling Column under Noel Kavanagh again attacks the Derrylin RUC barracks, killing constable John Scally, the campaign's first fatality.
- Ulster Protestant Action, a loyalist Protestant fundamentalist vigilante group, is founded at a special meeting at the Ulster Unionist Party's offices in Glengall Street, Belfast.
- Tayto (Northern Ireland) established by the Hutchinson family to manufacture potato chips at Tandragee, County Armagh.

== Arts and literature ==
- 23 April – Belfast-born author C. S. Lewis and American poet Joy Gresham have a civil marriage at Oxford register office.

== Sport ==
=== Football ===
- Irish League

Winners: Linfield

- Irish Cup

Winners: Distillery 2 - 2, 0 - 0, 1 - 0 Glentoran

== Births ==
- 14 January – Ronan Bennett, novelist and screenwriter.
- 5 February – Jackie Woodburne, actress.
- 7 February – Rose-Marie, singer (died 2024).
- 11 April – Bobby Storey, Provisional Irish Republican Army activist, escapee and Sinn Féin politician (died 2020).
- 15 April – Christopher Dye, Coordinator of Tuberculosis Monitoring and Evaluation at the World Health Organization and Gresham Professor of Physic.
- 7 May – David Catherwood, composer and conductor.
- 24 May – Michael Jackson, Anglican Bishop of Clogher (2002 - ).
- 2 September – Angelo Fusco, Provisional Irish Republican Army volunteer and escapee.
- 3 September – Pat McGeown, Provisional Irish Republican Army volunteer, participant in the 1981 Irish hunger strike (died 1996).
- 13 September – Bobby Campbell, footballer.
- 19 September – Gerry McElhinney, footballer.
- 10 October – Amanda Burton, actress.
- 18 November – Noel Brotherston, footballer (died 1995).
- Full date unknown – Don Mullan, writer and film producer.

== Deaths ==
- 20 February – James Cousins, poet and writer (born 1873).
- 18 March – Benjamin Glazer, Academy Award-winning writer, producer and director (born 1887).
- 23 July – Ella Young, poet (born 1867).
- 5 August – J. M. Andrews, second Prime Minister of Northern Ireland (born 1871).
- 25 November – Robert Bruce Bowers, cricketer (born 1897).

== See also ==
- 1956 in Scotland
- 1956 in Wales
