= 1947 in Ireland =

- Centuries: 18th; 19th; 20th; 21st
- Decades: 1920s; 1930s; 1940s; 1950s; 1960s
- See also: 1947 in Northern Ireland; Other events of 1947; List of years in Ireland

Events from the year 1947 in Ireland.

== Incumbents ==
- President: Seán T. O'Kelly
- Taoiseach: Éamon de Valera (FF)
- Tánaiste: Seán Lemass (FF)
- Minister for Finance: Frank Aiken (FF)
- Chief Justice: Conor Maguire
- Dáil: 12th
- Seanad: 5th

== Events ==
- 19 January to 15 March – an arctic cold snap with five major blizzards caused many deaths.
- 30 January – the internationally known labour leader Jim Larkin died in Dublin aged 72.
- 18 May – the 21st anniversary of the founding of the Fianna Fáil party was celebrated in the Capitol Theatre, Dublin.
- 7 July – the Aer Lingus airline began a direct service between Dublin and Amsterdam.
- 31 July – the Soviet Union blocked Ireland's entry into the United Nations.
- 11 August – the Enterprise Express train service commenced from Belfast to Dublin.
- 31 August – United States Congressman John F. Kennedy visited his sister Kathleen in Ireland during the Congressional summer recess. He visited again in 1955 and 1963.
- 14 September – the All-Ireland Football Final was played in the Polo Grounds in New York. Cavan were victorious over Kerry.
- 3 November – a 60-day transport strike ended in Dublin. Trams and buses returned to normal service.
  Undated

- The Customs Free Airport Act established Shannon as the world's first duty-free airport.
- The Poulaphouca Reservoir was completed.
- The Waterford Crystal glassmaking business was revived by Charles Bacik.

== Arts and literature ==
- June – Joan Denise Moriarty's Cork Ballet Group gave its first performance, at the Cork Opera House under the baton of Aloys Fleischmann.
- Donagh MacDonagh's poetry The Hungry Grass was published.
- Séamus Ó Néill's novel Tonn Tuile was the first book published by Irish language publisher Sáirséal agus Dill in Dublin.

== Sport ==
=== Football ===
League of Ireland
Winners: Shelbourne

FAI Cup
Winners: Cork United 2–2, 2–1 Bohemians.

=== Gaelic Games ===
- Cavan won historic All Ireland final in Polo Grounds, New York.

=== Golf ===
- The Irish Open was won by Harry Bradshaw (Ireland).

=== Swimming ===
- 27–28 July – English endurance swimmer Tom Blower became the first person to swim the North Channel, from Donaghadee in County Down to Portpatrick in Scotland.

== Births ==
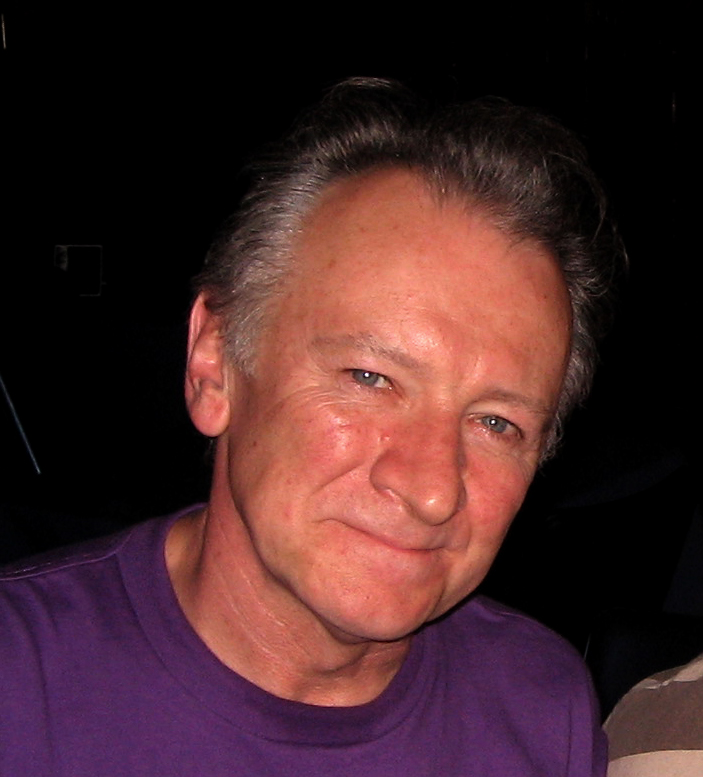
Donal Lunny, born on 10 March 1947

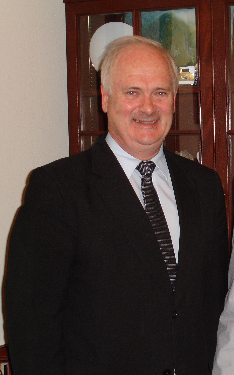
John Bruton, born on 18 May 1947

- 18 January – John O'Conor, pianist.
- 26 January – Red Morris, 4th Baron Killanin, film producer.
- 9 February – Eamon Duffy, religious historian.
- 1 March
  - Liz McManus, Labour Party TD for Wicklow.
  - Kate Walsh, Progressive Democrats Senator (died 2007).
- 10 March – Dónal Lunny, folk musician and record producer (died 2026).
- 22 March – Brian Fitzgerald, Labour Party TD.
- 30 March
  - Kevin Myers, journalist.
  - Dick Roche, university lecturer, Fianna Fáil TD for Wicklow, Cabinet Minister.
- 16 April – Eamonn Rogers, soccer player.
- 17 April – Linda Martin, singer.
- 24 April – Johnny McEvoy, singer.
- 27 April – Patrick Lynch, Auxiliary Bishop of the Archdiocese of Southwark.
- 18 May – John Bruton, Taoiseach, European Union Ambassador to the United States (died 2024).
- 22 May – Seán Ó Neachtain, Fianna Fáil Member of the European Parliament representing North-West.
- 8 July – Jonathan Kelly, folk rock singer-songwriter.
- 18 July – Dermot Healy, novelist and poet (died 2014).
- 20 July – Joe O'Toole, President of the Irish Trades Union Congress and Senator.
- 31 July – Olivia Mitchell, Fine Gael TD representing Dublin South (1997 – ).
- 1 August – Tommy Broughan, Labour Party TD for Dublin North-East.
- 3 August
  - Sally Oldfield, singer.
  - G. V. Wright, Fianna Fáil TD and member of Seanad Éireann.
- 21 August – Philip Lawrence, a London-based headmaster, stabbed to death outside the gates of his school when he went to help a pupil being attacked by a gang (died 1995).
- 25 August – Anne Harris, journalist.
- 2 September – Kevin Farrell, Bishop of Dallas, Texas.
- 7 September – Roger Bolton, trade unionist in UK (died 2006).
- 2 October – Damien Martin, Offaly hurler.
- 9 October – Frank Dunlop, public relations consultant, planning advisor, Fianna Fáil Government Press Secretary (1977–1982).
- 26 October – Trevor Joyce, poet.
- 9 November
  - Pat Carey, Fianna Fáil TD for Dublin North-West and Minister of State.
  - Frank Cummins, Kilkenny hurler.
- 25 November
  - Seán Ardagh, Fianna Fáil TD for Dublin South-Central (died 2016).
  - Steve Heighway, soccer player.
- 1 December – Jimmy Dunne, soccer player.
- 4 December
  - Moosajee Bhamjee, physician, Ireland's first Muslim Teachta Dála (1992–1997), 27th Dáil.
  - Terry Woods, folk musician.
- 5 December
  - Tony Gregory, independent politician and TD for Dublin Central.
  - Seán Quinn, businessman.

=== Undated ===
- Vincent Brown, sculptor.
- Noel Elliott, international rugby union player.
- Johnny Flaherty, Offaly hurler.
- Mick Foster, folk musician.
- Jimmy Gregg, soccer player.
- Éamonn Grimes, Limerick hurler.
- Pat Hegarty, Cork hurler.
- John Holloway, sociologist and philosopher.
- Dermot Somers, mountaineer, explorer, writer and broadcaster.

== Deaths ==
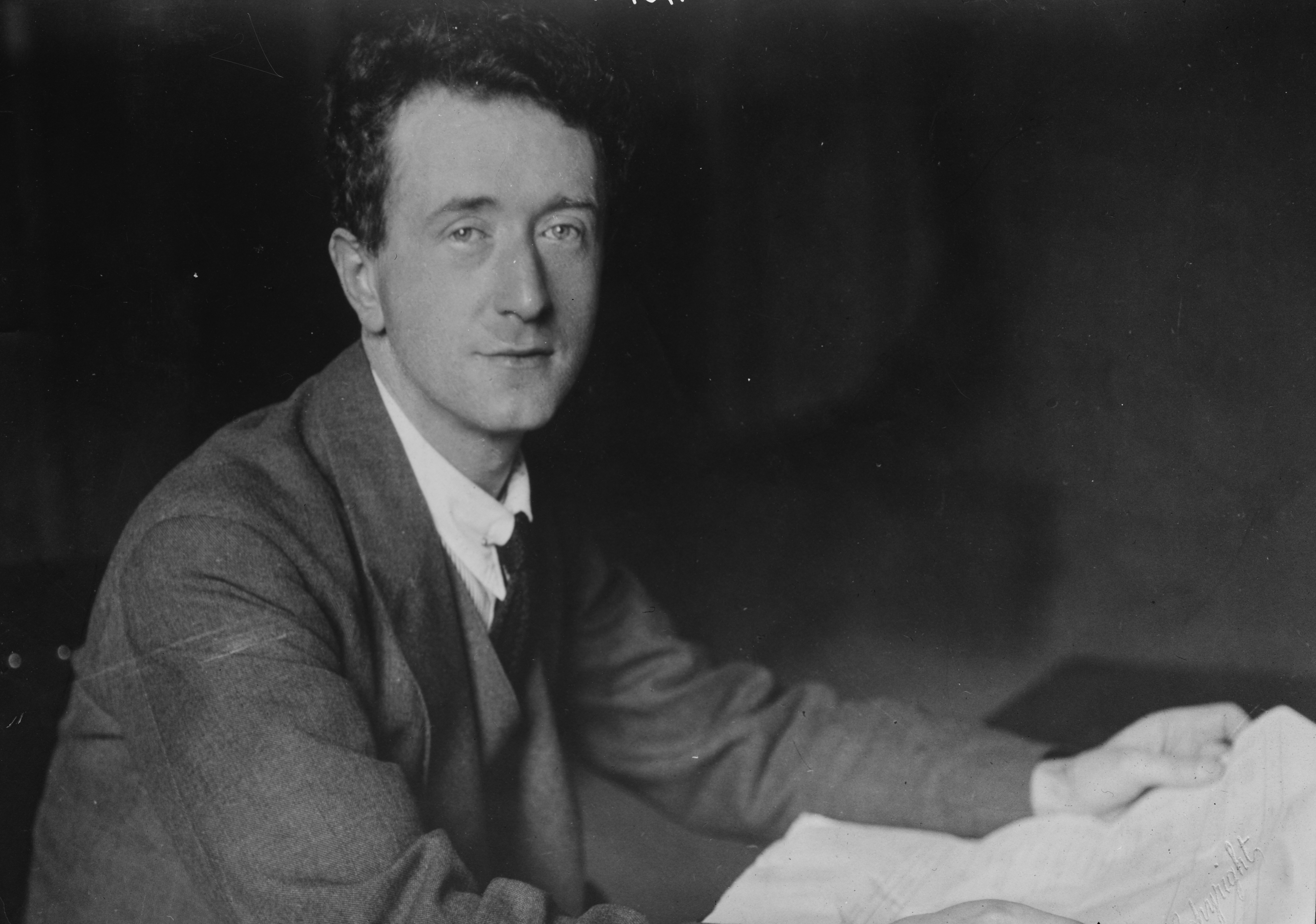
Desmond FitzGerald, died 9 April 1947

- 2 January – Tom Ross, cricketer (born in 1872).
- 4 January – Derrick Hall, cricketer (born in 1892).
- 4 January – Forrest Reid, novelist and literary critic (born in 1875).
- 21 January – Charles A. Callis, member of the Quorum of the Twelve Apostles of the Church of Jesus Christ of Latter-day Saints (born in 1865).
- 30 January – James Larkin, trade union leader, socialist and Labour Party TD (born in 1876).
- 3 March – Michael Egan, trade unionist, city councillor, and Cumann na nGaedheal TD (born in 1866).
- 9 April – Desmond FitzGerald, Sinn Féin MP, TD, cabinet minister and Seanad Éireann member (born in 1888).
- 16 May – Augusta Crichton-Stuart, Marchioness of Bute (born in 1880).
- 18 June – John Henry Patterson, soldier, hunter and writer (born in 1867).
- 4 September – P. J. Moloney, chemist, member of First Dáil representing South Tipperary.
