= 1951 in Northern Ireland =

- Centuries: 20th; 21st
- Decades: 1930s; 1940s; 1950s; 1960s; 1970s
- See also: 1951 in the United Kingdom; 1951 in Ireland; Other events of 1951; List of years in Northern Ireland

Events during the year 1951 in Northern Ireland.

== Incumbents ==
- Governor - Earl Granville
- Prime Minister - Basil Brooke

== Events ==
- 2 February – Éamon de Valera visits Newry for the first time since his arrest there in 1924.
- 17 March – Free Presbyterian Church of Ulster formed in Crossgar, County Down, by Ian Paisley.
- 19 April – The Attorney General for Northern Ireland, Ed Warnock, referring to the resignation of Noel Browne from the Government of the Republic of Ireland, says that Ireland is really ruled by Maynooth.
- Summer - Festival of Britain events in Belfast:
  - Arts festival directed by Tyrone Guthrie (7 May–30 June).
  - Ulster Farm and Factory Exhibition at Montgomery Road, Castlereagh (1 June–31 August).
  - Locally-built Festival Ship Campania on show in Pollock Dock (15 August–1 September).
- 1 July – Taoiseach Éamon de Valera pays his first visit to Derry in 25 years.
- Public Order Act (Northern Ireland) 1951 is introduced, requiring organisers of public processions to give 48 hours' notice to the Royal Ulster Constabulary (RUC), except for funeral processions and "public processions which are customarily held along a particular route".

== Arts and literature ==
- Daniel O'Neill paints Knockalla Hills, Donegal and Western Landscape.

== Sport ==
=== Football ===
- Irish League

Winners: Glentoran

- Irish Cup

Winners: Glentoran 3 - 1 Ballymena United

=== Golf ===
- A qualifying round of The Open Championship is played at Portstewart Golf Club.
- Fred Daly plays in the Ryder Cup.

== Births ==
=== January to June ===
- 8 January – Alex Maskey, Sinn Féin MLA.
- 2 February – Steve Brennan, darts player.
- 23 February – David McClarty, Ulster Unionist Party MLA.
- 24 February – David Ford, leader of the Alliance Party and MLA.
- 3 March – Trevor Anderson, footballer and football manager.
- March - Gary Anderson, racing car designer and motorsport commentator.
- 7 May – Denis Murray, television journalist.
- 10 May – Charlie Nash, boxer.
- 20 June – Paul Muldoon, poet.
- 21 June – Dolours Price, volunteer of the Provisional Irish Republican Army (died 2013).
- 27 June – Mary McAleese, eighth President of Ireland.

=== July to December ===
- 30 August – Dana Rosemary Scallon, singer, Eurovision Song Contest winner and MEP.
- 4 September – John Lowry-Corry, 8th Earl Belmore, art collector.
- 13 September – Anne Devlin, writer.
- 14 September – Joe McDonnell, volunteer in the Provisional Irish Republican Army, who dies in the 1981 Irish hunger strike (died 1981).
- 15 September – Ernest Charles Nelson, botanist.
- 20 September – David McCalden, Holocaust denier (died 1990).
- 20 December – Nuala O'Loan, first Police Ombudsman for Northern Ireland, between 1999 and 2007.
- 22 December – Gerald Grosvenor, 6th Duke of Westminster, landowner (died 2016).

=== Full date unknown ===
- Marie Jones, actress and playwright.
- John Kindness, multi-media artist.
- Patrick Magee, Provisional Irish Republican Army member involved in the Brighton hotel bombing and writer.
- Brendan McFarlane, Provisional Irish Republican Army member, Maze escapee, facing alleged kidnapping trial.
- Malachi O'Doherty, journalist, author and broadcaster.

== Deaths ==
- 18 January – Amy Carmichael, Christian missionary and writer (born 1867).
- 4 November – Charles Billingsley, cricketer (born 1910).

== See also ==
- 1951 in Scotland
- 1951 in Wales
