= 1952 in Northern Ireland =

- Centuries: 20th; 21st
- Decades: 1930s; 1940s; 1950s; 1960s; 1970s
- See also: 1952 in the United Kingdom; 1952 in Ireland; Other events of 1952; List of years in Northern Ireland

Events during the year 1952 in Northern Ireland.

== Incumbents ==
- Governor - Earl Granville (until 1 December), The Lord Wakehurst (from 1 December)
- Prime Minister - Basil Brooke

== Events ==
- August - Official opening of Binnian Tunnel (2.5 miles (4.0 km)), feeding water to the Silent Valley Reservoir under the Mourne Mountains.
- 12 November – Murder of Patricia Curran, 19-year-old daughter of Sir Lancelot Curran. Iain Hay Gordon was found guilty of her murder, but the sentence was overturned in 2000.

== Arts and literature ==
- Daniel O'Neill paints Birth.

== Sport ==
=== Football ===
- Irish League

Winners: Glenavon

- Irish Cup

Winners: Ards 1 - 0 Glentoran

== Births ==
- 8 January – Alex Maskey, first Sinn Féin Lord Mayor of Belfast, Councillor and MLA.
- 18 January – Derek Spence, footballer.
- 25 February – Joey Dunlop, motorcycle racer (died 2000).
- 1 March – Martin O'Neill, international footballer and football manager.
- 2 March – Lenny Murphy, loyalist paramilitary and leader of the Shankill Butchers (died 1982).
- 27 March – Linda Martin, singer.
- 4 April – Gary Moore, guitarist.
- 22 April – Gerald Dawe, writer and poet.
- 7 June – Liam Neeson, actor.
- 25 June – Alan Green, sports broadcaster.
- 17 October – Graham Forsythe, artist.
- 20 December – Terry George, screenwriter and film director.

=== Full date unknown ===
- John Linehan, drag performer (May McFettridge).
- Tommy McKearney, hunger striker, member of the Provisional Irish Republican Army, later journalist.
- William Peskett, poet.

== See also ==
- 1952 in Scotland
- 1952 in Wales
