= 1956 in Ireland =

- Centuries: 18th; 19th; 20th; 21st
- Decades: 1930s; 1940s; 1950s; 1960s; 1970s
- See also: 1956 in Northern Ireland; Other events of 1956; List of years in Ireland

Events from the year 1956 in Ireland.

== Incumbents ==
- President: Seán T. O'Kelly
- Taoiseach: John A. Costello (FG)
- Tánaiste: William Norton (Lab)
- Minister for Finance: Gerard Sweetman (FG)
- Chief Justice: Conor Maguire
- Dáil: 15th
- Seanad: 8th

== Events ==
- 15 February – Senator Owen Sheehy-Skeffington introduced a motion calling for the prohibition of all corporal punishment for girls in Irish national schools.
- 2 April – President Seán T. O'Kelly unveiled a bust of politician, revolutionary, and suffragist Constance Markievicz in St Stephen's Green, Dublin.
- 1 May – the Minister for Education Richard Mulcahy introduced the debate on a separate government department for the Gaeltacht.
- 21 May – President Seán T. O'Kelly opened the first Cork International Film Festival.
- 29 May – T. K. Whitaker was appointed new Secretary at the Department of Finance.
- 12 August – The Gaelic Athletic Association postponed the All-Ireland Hurling and Football Finals due to an outbreak of polio.
- 21 November – Our Lady's Hospital for Sick Children was opened in Crumlin.
- 30 November – Petrol rationing was due to be introduced from next 1 January due to the Suez Crisis.
- 1 December – At the Olympic Games in Melbourne, Australia, Ronnie Delany won Ireland's first Olympic gold medal for 24 years.
- 12 December – The Irish Republican Army launched its Border Campaign in Northern Ireland with the bombing of a BBC relay transmitter in County Londonderry, burning of a courthouse in Magherafelt by a unit led by 18-year-old Seamus Costello, and of an Ulster Special Constabulary post near Newry and blowing up of a half-built British Army barracks at Enniskillen. A raid on Gough Barracks in Armagh was beaten off after a brief exchange of fire.
- Undated
  - The second Coimisiún na Gaeltachta redefined the boundaries of the Gaeltacht.
  - Robert Briscoe became the first Jewish Lord Mayor of Dublin.

== Arts and literature ==
- June – Painter Louis le Brocquy represented Ireland at the Venice Biennale.
- Samuel Beckett's novel Malone Dies was published in English.

== Sport ==
=== Association football ===
League of Ireland
Winners: St Patrick's Athletic

FAI Cup
Winners: Shamrock Rovers 3–2 Cork Athletic.

== Births ==
- 1 January – John O'Donohue, poet and philosopher (died in 2008).
- 16 January – Denis Moran, Kerry Gaelic footballer.
- 17 January – Joe Hennessy, Kilkenny hurler.
- 27 January – Joe Duffy, radio presenter.
- 11 February – Pat Carroll, Offaly hurler (died 1986).
- 13 February – Liam Brady, international soccer player.
- 21 February – Johnny Crowley, Cork hurler.
- 4 March – Ciarán Brennan, singer, songwriter, producer and instrumentalist.
- 13 April – Jim Lynagh, Provisional Irish Republican Army member killed in an ambush by the Special Air Service during an attack on Loughgall RUC station (died in 1987).
- 16 April – Paul Drechsler, businessman.
- 29 April – Kevin Moran, Gaelic footballer and soccer player.
- 30 April – Liam T. Cosgrave, Fine Gael politician, Cathaoirleach of Seanad Éireann 1996–1997
- 4 May – Steve Barron, film director and producer.
- 5 May – Mary Coughlan, singer.
- 9 May – Brendan Howlin, national school teacher, Labour Party TD for Wexford and cabinet minister.
- 15 May – Pat Byrne, soccer player and manager.
- 18 May – Pat Fleury, Offaly hurler, manager.
- 21 May – Sean Kelly, cyclist and broadcaster.
- 24 May – Michael Jackson, Church of Ireland Bishop of Clogher.
- 28 May – John O'Donoghue, Fianna Fáil TD for Kerry South and Cabinet Minister.
- 1 June – Brendan Smith, Fianna Fáil TD for Cavan–Monaghan and Minister of State.
- 4 June – Gerry Ryan, RTÉ radio presenter. (Died in 2010)
- 7 June – Marty Whelan, RTÉ radio and television presenter.
- 1 July – Liz O'Donnell, Deputy Leader of the Progressive Democrats, TD and Minister of State.
- 10 July – Frank Stapleton, soccer player and manager.
- 12 July – Cathal Ó Searcaigh, poet.
- August – Denis Mulcahy, Cork hurler.
- 26 August – Dick Hooper, long-distance runner.
- 5 September – Willie Mullins, jockey, racehorse trainer.
- 4 October – Mary Kennedy, television presenter.
- 13 October – Joe Connolly, Galway hurler.
- 1 November – Charles Flanagan, Fine Gael TD for Laois–Offaly.
- 5 November – Marita Conlon-McKenna, children's writer.
- 4 December – Nia Griffith Welsh Labour Member of Parliament.
- 19 December – Shane McEntee, Fine Gael TD for Meath East.
  Undated

- Patrick Cassidy, composer.
- Dorothy Cross, sculptor and installation artist.
- Frankie Gavin, fiddle and flute player.
- Alice Maher, painter and sculptor.
- Valerie Mulvin, architect.
- Tadhg Murphy, Cork hurler.
- Richie Reid, Kilkenny hurler.
- Fran Rooney, businessman.

== Deaths ==
- 30 January – Sir John Keane, 5th Baronet, barrister, member of Seanad Éireann (born in 1873).
- 20 February – James Cousins, poet and writer (born in 1873).
- 21 February – Louis Meldon, cricketer (born in 1886).
- 13 March – Alfie Byrne, Irish Nationalist politician, served both as a Member of parliament in the British House of Commons and as a Teachta Dála in Dáil Éireann (born in 1882).
- 18 March – Benjamin Glazer, Academy Award-winning writer, film producer and director (born in 1887).
- 19 March – Matt Goff, Kildare Gaelic footballer (born in 1901).
- 24 March – Bob Lambert, cricketer (born in 1874).
- 20 April – Ida Mary Costello, wife of Taoiseach John A. Costello (born in 1891).
- 17 May – John Tudor Gwynn, cricketer (born in 1881).
- 22 May – Elizabeth Cronin, traditional singer (born in 1879).
- 11 June – Seán Óg Murphy, Cork hurler, Gaelic Athletic Association administrator (born in 1892).
- 23 July – Ella Young, poet (born in 1867).
- 5 August – J. M. Andrews, second Prime Minister of Northern Ireland (born in 1871).
- 23 September – Arthur Duff, composer and conductor (born in 1899).
- 6 November – Leo Whelan, painter (born in 1892).
- 19 November – Thomas Derrig, Fianna Fáil TD and Cabinet Minister (born in 1897).
- 25 November – Robert Bruce Bowers, cricketer (born in 1897).
- 11 December – Frederic Charles Dreyer, British Royal Navy Admiral (born in 1878).
- 27 December – Lambert McKenna, Jesuit priest and writer (born in 1870).
- Undated – Geoffrey Taylor, born Jeoffrey Phibbs, poet (born 1900 in England).
