= 1957 in Ireland =

- Centuries: 18th; 19th; 20th; 21st
- Decades: 1930s; 1940s; 1950s; 1960s; 1970s
- See also: 1957 in Northern Ireland; Other events of 1957; List of years in Ireland

Events from the year 1957 in Ireland.

== Incumbents ==
- President: Seán T. O'Kelly
- Taoiseach:
  - John A. Costello (FG) (until 20 March 1957)
  - Éamon de Valera (FF) (from 20 March 1957)
- Tánaiste:
  - William Norton (Lab) (until 20 March 1957)
  - Seán Lemass (FF) (from 20 March 1957)
- Minister for Finance:
  - Gerard Sweetman (FG) (until 20 March 1957)
  - James Ryan (FF) (from 20 March 1957)
- Chief Justice: Conor Maguire
- Dáil:
  - 15th (until 4 February 1957)
  - 16th (from 20 March 1957)
- Seanad:
  - 8th (until 28 March 1957)
  - 9th (from 22 May 1957)

== Events ==
- 1 January – Border Campaign: Seán South and Fergal O'Hanlon were killed in an Irish Republican Army (IRA) attack on a Royal Ulster Constabulary barracks in Brookeborough, County Fermanagh. The Government of Ireland used the current Offences Against the State Act to arrest most of the IRA's leadership, including its chief of staff, Seán Cronin.
- 12 January – Over a hundred republicans were arrested under the Special Powers Act in Northern Ireland.
- 24 January – Sir Alfred Chester Beatty became the first person granted honorary citizenship of Ireland.
- 4 February – St. Mary's Church of Ireland Cathedral at Elphin, County Roscommon, was severely damaged in a violent storm, leading to its abandonment.
- 3 March – Éamon de Valera told a crowd in Cork that a United Ireland could be achieved with time and the support of the people.
- 5 March – 1957 Irish general election: The Fianna Fáil party under Éamon de Valera returned to power, winning 78 seats. Members of the 16th Dáil assembled on 20 March.
- 7 March – A Percival Provost aircraft crashed on the lower eastern slope of Table Mountain, County Wicklow with the loss of one life.
- 11 March – Prize Bonds were introduced; the Bank of Ireland operated the scheme on behalf of the Minister for Finance.
- May–September – Fethard-on-Sea Ne Temere boycott: a Roman Catholic priest and some of his parishioners organised a boycott of Protestant-owned local businesses.
- 4 July – Following the killing of a Royal Ulster Constabulary officer, the new Government of Ireland introduced wholesale internment without trial for IRA suspects.
- 4 July – The Dáil debated the Fethard-on-Sea Ne Temere boycott.
- 22 July – The Gough Monument in the Phoenix Park in Dublin was wrecked by an explosion so violent that it was heard all over the city.
- 7 August – A 20-foot high war memorial in Limerick was blown up. It was erected to commemorate British soldiers from Limerick who died in World War I.
- 30 September – Last day of operation of 97 miles (155 km) of railway in Northern Ireland (Great Northern Railway (GNR) branches and the entire Sligo, Leitrim and Northern Counties Railway) following government instructions. County Fermanagh lost all its lines. The GNR closed a further 84 miles (134 km) of connecting lines in the Republic on October 12.
- 2 October – The Minister for Health, Seán MacEntee, launched the Voluntary Health Insurance Board.
- 7 October – President Seán T. O'Kelly's country residence, Roundwood House, County Wicklow, was destroyed by fire.
- 10 October – The Windscale fire began with a fire in a graphite core of a reactor at the Windscale Nuclear Power station and reprocessing centre on the Cumberland coast of North West England. Years later there were claims that the radiation caused cancers and birth defects in County Louth.
- 27 October – The foundation stone of Galway Cathedral was blessed.
- 1 November – The Soviet satellite Sputnik was visible over Dublin for the second time in a month.
- November – Border Campaign: The premature explosion of a bomb at a farmhouse in County Louth killed four IRA men and a householder.
- Undated – Cyril Lord opened a new factory for the production of tufted carpets at Donaghadee, County Down.

== Arts and literature ==
- 13 January – Samuel Beckett's All That Fall (set in a fictionalised Foxrock) was first broadcast (on the BBC Third Programme in the U.K.), with J. G. Devlin in a leading role.
- 12 May – The Pike Theatre in Dublin staged the Tennessee Williams play The Rose Tattoo. During its short run the theatre was invaded by Gardaí (police) and director Alan Simpson was arrested for producing "a lewd entertainment" for a mime of dropping a condom onto the floor.
- The Bachelors musical group formed as The Harmonichords in Dublin.
- Publication of Tomás de Bhaldraithe's English-Irish Dictionary.
- Publication of Heinrich Böll's Irisches Tagebuch (Irish Journal).

== Sport ==
=== Association football ===
- 19 May – Ireland 1–1 England (at Dalymount Park).

=== Golf ===
- 27 June – Philomena Garvey won the British Ladies Amateur Golf Championship at Gleneagles.

== Births ==
- 17 January – Colm Burke, Fine Gael Lord Mayor of Cork, MEP.
- 22 January – Ray Flynn, Irish-American runner
- 7 February – Regina Joyce, long-distance runner.
- 15 February
  - Dave Langan, association football player.
  - David Stanton, Fine Gael TD for Cork East.
- 26 February – Charlie Nelligan, Kerry Gaelic footballer.
- 6 April – Dermot Mac Curtain, Cork hurler.
- 8 April – Richie Power, Kilkenny hurler.
- 23 April – Tommy Quaid, Limerick hurler (died 1998).
- 13 March – Patricia McKenna, Green Party politician.
- 7 March – Seán Crowe, Sinn Féin TD for Dublin South-West.
- 21 March – Pat Breen, Fine Gael TD for Clare.
- 20 May – Dermot Gallagher, association football referee.
- 23 May – Jimmy McShane, singer
- 28 May – Dick O'Hara, Kilkenny hurler.
- 17 June – Philip Chevron, born Philip Ryan, Celtic punk singer-songwriter and guitarist (died 2013).
- 20 June – Kieran Brennan, Kilkenny hurler and Irish Army general.
- 17 July – Terry Eviston, association football player.
- July – Catherine Connolly, politician.
- 2 August – Ashley Grimes, association football player and coach.
- 7 August – Daire Brehan, actress, broadcaster and barrister (died 2012).
- 28 August – Tom Cashman, Cork hurler.
- 26 September – Finbar Wright, singer.
- 8 October – Martha Kearney, radio journalist.
- 14 October – John Henderson, Kilkenny hurler.
- 16 October – Eoin Liston, Kerry Gaelic footballer.
- 6 November – Siobhán McCarthy, actress.
- 19 November – Jack O'Shea, Kerry Gaelic footballer.
- 24 November – John Minihan, soldier, Progressive Democrats Seanad Éireann member.
- 12 December – Jon Kenny, comedian (died 2024).
- 17 December – Robbie Gaffney, association football player.
- 25 December – Shane MacGowan, English-born Celtic punk singer-songwriter (died 2023).

Undated
- Desmond Dinan, academic and author.
- Angela Downey, Kilkenny camogie player.
- Shani Mootoo, fiction writer and visual artist.
- Paul Woodfull, writer, actor, comedian and musician

== Deaths ==
- 1 January – Fergal O'Hanlon, Irish Republican Army member killed with Seán South attacking the Royal Ulster Constabulary barracks in Brookeborough (born in 1936).
- 1 January – Seán South, IRA leader fatally wounded during an attack on a Royal Ulster Constabulary barracks in Brookeborough (born in 1929).
- 11 January – Anthony Mulvey, editor and Nationalist Party MP (born in 1882).
- 16 February – John Sealy Townsend, mathematical physicist (died in 1868).
- 25 March
  - Ernie O'Malley, prominent officer in the Irish Republican Army during the Irish War of Independence and on anti-Treaty side in the Irish Civil War and a writer (born in 1897).
  - George Townshend, writer, clergyman who converted to the Baháʼí Faith (born in 1876).
- 28 March – Jack B. Yeats, artist (born in 1871).
- 29 March – John J. O'Kelly, politician, author and publisher, president of the Gaelic League and Sinn Féin (born in 1872).
- 11 April – Freeman Wills Crofts, novelist (born in 1879).
- 23 May – William Meldon, cricketer (born in 1879).
- 26 May – Edward Hutchinson Synge, theoretical physicist (born in 1890)
- 26 June – Colm Gallagher, Fianna Fáil TD for Dublin North-Central and boxing referee.
- 1 August – Cathal O'Byrne, singer, poet and writer (born in 1867).
- 22 September – Oliver St. John Gogarty, physician, poet and writer (born in 1878).
- 25 October – Edward Plunkett, 18th Baron Dunsany, writer and dramatist (born 1878).
- 9 November – Peter O'Connor, athlete (born in 1872).
- 16 November – Seán Moylan, member Irish Volunteers, Sinn Féin and Fianna Fáil TD, Cabinet Minister and Seanad Éireann member (born in 1888).
- 6 December – Michael James O'Rourke, soldier, recipient of the Victoria Cross for gallantry in 1917 at Hill 70 near Lens, France (born in 1878).
- 21 December – Thomas Sadleir, genealogist (born in 1882).
