= 1953 in Ireland =

- Centuries: 18th; 19th; 20th; 21st
- Decades: 1930s; 1940s; 1950s; 1960s; 1970s
- See also: 1953 in Northern Ireland; Other events of 1953; List of years in Ireland

Events from the year 1953 in Ireland.

== Incumbents ==
- President: Seán T. O'Kelly
- Taoiseach: Éamon de Valera (FF)
- Tánaiste: Seán Lemass (FF)
- Minister for Finance: Seán MacEntee (FF)
- Chief Justice: Conor Maguire
- Dáil: 14th
- Seanad: 7th

== Events ==
- 18 January – The Sinn Féin party decided to contest all twelve constituencies in the next Westminster elections in Northern Ireland.
- 31 January - The ferry MV Princess Victoria sank during a storm in the North Channel with the loss of 135 lives.
- 15 March
  - Up to ten thousand civil servants marched on O'Connell Street in Dublin demanding a just wage.
  - The first mass was celebrated in the newly opened Church of Our Lady of the Assumption, Ballyfermot in Dublin
- 16 March – Franklin Delano Roosevelt, Jr. asked the United States Congress to support a United Ireland.
- 27 April – Republican revolutionary, suffragette, and actress Maud Gonne MacBride died at her home in Dublin aged 88.
- 1 May – The first television transmitter in Ireland was brought into service by the BBC at Glencairn.
- 3 June – Five hundred unemployed men marched to Kildare Street in Dublin demanding employment, not dole.
- 6 July – A thousand unemployed people sat on O'Connell Bridge in Dublin for fifteen minutes of protest.
- 2 August – Murlough Bay in the Glens of Antrim was chosen as the future grave of executed diplomat and nationalist Roger Casement. Taoiseach Éamon de Valera called for the return of his remains from Britain.
- 29 August – Kilmainham Gaol was chosen to be preserved as a national monument.
- 30 August – A new synagogue was dedicated at Terenure in Dublin, designed by Wilfrid Cantwell.
- 1 September – The Great Northern Railway was sold to the governments of the Republic and Northern Ireland and managed by a joint board.
- 21 September – The Irish ploughing team left Dublin for the world ploughing championships in Canada.
- 20 October – The Busáras bus station opened in Dublin. It was designed by Michael Scott in the International Style.
- 28 October – Three Independent teachtaí dála (members of parliament) of the 14th Dáil became members of the Fianna Fáil party.
- 30 October – Standish Vereker, 7th Viscount Gort, purchased Bunratty Castle to restore it.
- 17 November – The Great Blasket Island was depopulated.
- 18 December – The Censorship Board banned almost a hundred publications after deciding they were indecent or obscene.

== Arts and literature ==
- 5 January – Samuel Beckett's play Waiting For Godot had its first public stage première in French as En attendant Godot in Paris. His novel The Unnamable was also published in French this year.
- 5–26 April – The first An Tóstal festivals of national culture (devised by Seán Lemass) were held.
- 8 August – Chester Beatty Library in Dublin opened to the public.
- Writer Brian O'Nolan was obliged to retire from his senior post in the Civil Service.

== Sport ==
=== Association football ===
League of Ireland
Winners: Shelbourne

FAI Cup
Winners: Cork Athletic 2–2, 2–1 Evergreen United.

=== Golf ===
- Irish Open is won by Eric Brown (Scotland).

== Births ==
- 6 January – Noel Dempsey, Fianna Fáil TD for Meath West and Minister for Transport.
- b27 January – Ger Loughnane, Clare hurler, manager of Galway hurling team.
- 28 January – Hugo Hamilton, writer.
- 4 February – James Stirling, physicist and academic.
- 12 February – Des Smyth, golfer.
- 15 February – Tony Adams, Irish-American screenwriter and producer (d. 2005)
- 24 February – Eoin Ryan, Fianna Fáil TD, Member of the European Parliament for Dublin.
- 5 March – Brian Kerr, manager of the Republic of Ireland national football team.
- 6 March – James Bannon, Senator, Fine Gael TD for Longford–Westmeath.
- 11 March
  - Derek Daly, motor racing driver.
  - Mary Harney, Tánaiste and leader of the Progressive Democrats.
  - Tom McCormack, Kilkenny hurler.
- 15 March – Richard Bruton, Deputy Leader of Fine Gael, TD for Dublin North-Central.
- 31 March – Breeda Moynihan-Cronin, Labour Party (Ireland) TD.
- 28 April – Paul Darragh, showjumper (died 2005).
- 16 May – Pierce Brosnan, actor.
- 17 May – Mary Flaherty, Fine Gael TD and junior minister.
- 30 May – Colm Meaney, actor.
- 31 May – Jerry Kiernan, long-distance runner
- 2 June - Kevin Kiely, poet, critic, novelist, playwright.
- 7 June – Kathleen Lynch, Labour Party TD for Cork North-Central.
- 12 June – John Moloney, Fianna Fáil TD for Laois–Offaly.
- 18 June – Neil O'Donoghue, American football placekicker.
- 7 July – Jim Glennon, Fianna Fáil politician and TD.
- 29 July – Frank McGuinness, playwright, translator and poet.
- 14 August – Maureen Beattie, Scottish actress.
- 19 August – Tom Parlon, President of the Irish Farmers Association (1997–2001), Progressive Democrat TD representing Laois–Offaly.
- 1 September – Catherine Murphy, Independent TD.
- 18 September – Caoimhghín Ó Caoláin, bank official, Sinn Féin TD representing Cavan–Monaghan.
- 20 September – Joe Waters, soccer player.
- 23 September
  - Paudge Connolly, independent TD.
  - Dessie Ellis, Sinn Féin Dublin City councillor, IRA prisoner, first person extradited to the United Kingdom under the 1987 Extradition Act.
- 26 September – Dolores Keane, singer and musician.
- 3 November – Michael O'Regan, journalist (died 2024)
- 11 November – Jimmy Holmes, soccer player.
- 26 November – Marian Harkin, Member of the European Parliament representing North-West, Independent TD representing Sligo–Leitrim.
- 3 December – Nickey Brennan, Kilkenny hurler, President of the Gaelic Athletic Association.
  Full date unknown

- Patrick Deeley, poet.
- Rita Kelly, poet.
- Sheila O'Donnell, architect.

== Deaths ==
- 11 February – Valentine McEntee, 1st Baron McEntee, Labour Member of Parliament (MP) in the United Kingdom (born 1871).
- 22 February – John Caffrey, recipient of the Victoria Cross for gallantry in 1915 near La Brique, France (born 1891).
- March – Louisa Watson Peat, writer and lecturer, died in the United States (born 1883)
- 13 April – Alice Milligan, nationalist poet and author (born 1865).
- 15 April – John Dignan, Roman Catholic Bishop of Clonfert (born 1880).
- 17 April – Tom Sharkey, boxer (born 1873).
- 3 June – Philip Graves, journalist and writer (born 1876).
- 14 July – Frank Fahy, Sinn Féin MP and later Fianna Fáil TD, member of First Dáil, Ceann Comhairle (born 1880).
- 23 July – Maude Delap, marine biologist (born 1866).
- 12 September – James Hamilton, 3rd Duke of Abercorn, Unionist politician and first Governor of Northern Ireland (born 1869).
- 3 October – Sir Arnold Bax, English composer (born 1883).
- 17 October – Jack Rochford, Kilkenny hurler (born 1882).
- 30 October – John Counihan, farmer and salesmaster, Independent member of 1922 Seanad (born 1879).
- 1 November – Thomas F. O'Higgins, Fine Gael TD and cabinet minister (born 1890).
- 16 November – T. F. O'Rahilly, linguist and Irish language scholar (born 1882).
- 25 December – Patsy Donovan, Major League Baseball player and manager (born 1865).
