= 1948 in Northern Ireland =

- Centuries: 20th; 21st
- Decades: 1920s; 1930s; 1940s; 1950s; 1960s
- See also: 1948 in the United Kingdom; 1948 in Ireland; Other events of 1948; List of years in Northern Ireland

Events during the year 1948 in Northern Ireland.

== Incumbents ==
- Governor - Earl Granville
- Prime Minister - Basil Brooke

== Events ==
- 7 March – The Republic of Ireland's Minister for External Affairs, Seán MacBride, recommends an economic or customs union between the two parts of Ireland.
- 22 June – British Royal Navy aircraft carrier HMS Bulwark (R08) (laid down May 1945) is launched at the Harland and Wolff shipyard in Belfast.
- 5 July – The National Health Service launches in Northern Ireland
- 7 September – In Ottawa, Taoiseach John A. Costello announces that the Republic of Ireland government intends to repeal the 1936 External Relations Act, thus severing the last constitutional link with the United Kingdom.
- 2 September – Ulster Transport Authority set up.
- 13 September – 500 people attend a 1798 Rebellion commemoration on the hills overlooking Belfast.
- 17 October – At the request of the British Prime Minister Clement Attlee, the Irish Minister for Finance, Seán MacBride, and the Minister for External Affairs, Patrick McGilligan, meet representatives from the United Kingdom, Canada, Australia and New Zealand to discuss the repeal of the External Relations Act.
- 17 November – The Republic of Ireland Act, which involves the repeal of the External Relations Act, is introduced in Dáil Éireann.
- 25 November – The Republic of Ireland Bill is passed in Dáil Éireann.
- 21 December – President Seán T. O'Kelly signs the Republic of Ireland Bill at a ceremony at Áras an Uachtaráin.
- Short Brothers (aircraft manufacturers) transfer their headquarters and all operations to their Belfast factory.

== Arts and literature ==
- BBC begins broadcasting the weekly radio comedy drama series The McCooeys, written by Joseph Tomelty, from Belfast.
- The poet John Hewitt publishes No Rebel Word, The Lint Pulling and Fibres, Fabric and Cordage.
- The science fiction fanzine Slant, edited by Walt Willis with James White, begins publication.

== Sport ==
=== Football ===
- Irish Football Association joins FIFA.
- Irish League

Winners: Belfast Celtic

- Irish Cup

Winners: Linfield 3–0 Coleraine

- 26 December - Belfast Celtic F.C. play their last competitive match at Celtic Park.

== Births ==
=== January to June ===
- 9 January – John McMichael, Ulster Defence Association Brigadier (died 1987).
- 18 January – Shaun Davey, composer.
- 30 January – Paul Magee, volunteer in the Provisional Irish Republican Army, imprisoned a number of times.
- 22 February – Brian Kerr, a Justice of the Supreme Court of the United Kingdom (died 2020).
- 4 April – Derek Thompson, actor.
- 17 May – Roy Torrens, cricketer and footballer (died 2021).
- 25 May
  - Marianne Elliott, historian and academic.
  - David McNarry, Ulster Unionist Party MLA.
- 6 June – Cedric Wilson, Ulster Unionist politician.

=== July to December ===
- 1 July – Ian Johnston, cricketer.
- 1 July – Michael McGimpsey, Ulster Unionist Party MLA.
- 6 August – William McCrea, Democratic Unionist Party MP for Mid Ulster.
- 7 September – Walter Ellis, writer.
- 12 September – Derek Hussey, Ulster Unionist Party MLA.
- 27 September – Maurice Morrow, Baron Morrow, Democratic Unionist Party MLA and life peer.
- 6 October – Gerry Adams, MP and leader of Sinn Féin.
- 9 October – Ciaran Carson, poet and novelist.
- 16 October – Brendan Hughes, Officer Commanding of the Belfast Brigade of the Provisional Irish Republican Army.
- 6 November – David Montgomery, newspaper executive.
- 25 November – Paul Murphy, 14th Secretary of State for Northern Ireland.
- 23 December – Terri Hooley, music promoter.
- 29 December – Peter Robinson, First Minister, Democratic Unionist Party MP for East Belfast and member of the Northern Ireland Assembly.

=== Full date unknown ===
- Eamonn Coleman, Gaelic footballer and manager (died 2007).
- Jack Doherty, studio potter.
- Clifford Rainey, glass sculptor.

== Deaths ==
- 12 February – Armar Lowry-Corry, 5th Earl Belmore, High Sheriff and Deputy Lieutenant of County Fermanagh (born 1870).

== See also ==
- 1948 in Scotland
- 1948 in Wales
