= 1955 in Northern Ireland =

- Centuries: 20th; 21st
- Decades: 1930s; 1940s; 1950s; 1960s; 1970s
- See also: 1955 in the United Kingdom; 1955 in Ireland; Other events of 1955; List of years in Northern Ireland

Events during the year 1955 in Northern Ireland.

== Incumbents ==
- Governor - The Lord Wakehurst
- Prime Minister - Basil Brooke

== Events ==
- 21 July – The BBC brings into service its Divis transmitter, its first permanent facility serving Northern Ireland, marking the launch of a television service for Northern Ireland; the 35 kW transmissions can also be readily received in much of the Republic of Ireland.

== Arts and literature ==
- 22 March – A fire destroys much of the original rococo interior of Florence Court.
- Brian Moore's novel Judith Hearne is published.

== Sport ==
=== Football ===
- Irish League

Winners: Linfield

- Irish Cup

Winners: Dundela 3 - 0 Glenavon

== Births ==
- 11 January – Brian Gregory, footballer.
- 20 January – Joe Doherty, volunteer in the Provisional Irish Republican Army.
- 25 February – Davy Hyland, Sinn Féin, later independent, MLA.
- 28 March – John Alderdice, Baron Alderdice, Alliance Party politician and Speaker of the Northern Ireland Assembly 1998–2004.
- 2 April – Michael Stone, Ulster loyalist paramilitary.
- 30 April – BJ Hogg, actor (died 2020).
- 23 June – Ken Reid, television journalist.
- 6 July – Michael Boyd, theatre director (died 2023).
- 1 August – Adrian Logan, television sports presenter and reporter.
- 27 September
  - Gerry Convery, Canadian darts player.
  - Felix Healy, footballer and football manager.
- 30 September – Frankie Kennedy, traditional flute and tin whistle player and co-founder of Altan (died 1994).
- 16 October – Kieran Doherty, volunteer in the Provisional Irish Republican Army (died 1981 on hunger strike).
- 7 December – John McClelland, footballer.
- Undated
  - Bríd Brennan, actress.
  - Billy Hutchinson, Progressive Unionist Party leader.
  - Paddy McKillen, property investor.

== Deaths ==
- 22 January – Moira O'Neill, poet (born 1864).
- 11 April – Margaret McCoubrey, suffragette and pacifist (born 1880 in Scotland).
- 14 May – Robert Quigg, soldier, recipient of the Victoria Cross for gallantry in 1916 at the Battle of the Somme (born 1885).
- 18 July – Billy McCandless, footballer and football manager (born 1893).
- 14 December – Paddy Mayne, international rugby union footballer and decorated soldier (born 1915).
- Undated – Unsinkable Sam, ship's cat (born before 1941 in Germany).

== See also ==
- 1955 in Scotland
- 1955 in Wales
