= 1954 in Northern Ireland =

- Centuries: 20th; 21st
- Decades: 1930s; 1940s; 1950s; 1960s; 1970s
- See also: 1954 in the United Kingdom; 1954 in Ireland; Other events of 1954; List of years in Northern Ireland

Events during the year 1954 in Northern Ireland.

== Incumbents ==
- Governor - The Lord Wakehurst
- Prime Minister - Basil Brooke

== Events ==
- 6 April – Flags and Emblems (Display) Act (Northern Ireland) is introduced, making it illegal to interfere with the display of a Union Flag and giving the Royal Ulster Constabulary the right to remove any other flag or emblem if it is thought that it might lead to a breach of peace.
- 12 June – An Irish Republican Army unit carries out a successful arms raid on Gough Barracks in Armagh signalling the renewal of IRA activity following a long hiatus.
- 17 August – Ocean liner SS Southern Cross is launched by Harland and Wolff in Belfast.
- The Republican political party Fianna Uladh is formed by Liam Kelly as the political wing of Saor Uladh.
- Roselawn Cemetery opens in Belfast.

== Arts and literature ==
- John Hewitt's The Bloody Brae: A Dramatic Poem (1936) is first broadcast on the BBC Northern Ireland Home Service.

== Sport ==
=== Football ===
- Irish League

Winners: Linfield

- Irish Cup

Winners: Derry City 2 – 2, 0 – 0, 1 – 0 Glentoran

== Births ==
- 9 March – Bobby Sands, Provisional Irish Republican Army volunteer and MP (died on hunger strike 1981).
- 8 April – Joe Kernan, Gaelic footballer and manager.
- 28 April – Monica McWilliams, Northern Ireland Women's Coalition MLA, later Chief Commissioner of the Northern Ireland Human Rights Commission.
- 11 May – Jane Morrice, Northern Ireland Women's Coalition MLA.
- 23 May – Gerry Armstrong, footballer.
- 23 June – Michael Copeland, Unionist politician.
- 2 August – Sammy McIlroy, footballer and football manager.
- 28 August – Clive Culbertson, mystic, musician and healer.
- 12 October – Kieran Deeny, medical doctor turned independent politician and MLA.
- 19 October – Angela Feeney, opera singer.
- Eamon Collins, Provisional Irish Republican Army activist and writer (died 1999).
- Martin O'Brien, journalist.
- Marian Price, Provisional Irish Republican Army volunteer.

== Deaths ==
- 1 May – James Macmahon, civil servant and businessman, Under-Secretary for Ireland from 1918 to 1922 (born 1865).
- 11 October – Thomas Teevan, Unionist politician and lawyer (born 1927).

== See also ==
- 1954 in Scotland
- 1954 in Wales
