= 1950 in Northern Ireland =

- Centuries: 20th; 21st
- Decades: 1930s; 1940s; 1950s; 1960s; 1970s
- See also: 1950 in the United Kingdom; 1950 in Ireland; Other events of 1950; List of years in Northern Ireland

Events during the year 1950 in Northern Ireland.

== Incumbents ==
- Governor - Earl Granville
- Prime Minister - Basil Brooke

== Events ==
- 12 March – Llandow air disaster: 83 people die when a plane carrying Welsh rugby fans home from Belfast crashes in South Wales.
- 12 May – Nationalist Senators and MPs in Northern Ireland ask the government of the Republic to give Northern-elected representatives seats in the Dáil and Seanad.
- 3 July – Ulster Transport Authority closes the Ballycastle Railway and the Ballymena and Larne Railway.

== Arts and literature ==
- September - Poet Philip Larkin takes up a 5-year post as sub-librarian at Queen's University Belfast.

== Sport ==
This was the only year where Ireland didn't participate at the Commonwealth Games. (British Empire Games)

=== Football ===
- Irish League

Winners: Linfield

- Irish Cup

Winners: Linfield 2 - 1 Distillery

=== Golf ===
- British Ladies Amateur Golf Championship is held at Royal County Down Golf Club (winner:Vicomtesse de St Sauveur).

== Births ==
- 22 January – Paul Bew, professor of Irish politics at Queen's University of Belfast.
- 16 February – Peter Hain, 16th Secretary of State for Northern Ireland.
- 12 April – Donal McKeown, Auxiliary Bishop in the Roman Catholic Diocese of Down and Connor.
- 23 May – Martin McGuinness, Sinn Féin MP, MLA and Deputy First Minister (died 2017).
- 23 June – Martin O'Hagan, journalist (died 2001).
- 9 July – Alban Maginness, SDLP MLA.
- 12 August – Medbh McGuckian, poet.
- 28 September – Brian Keenan, writer and hostage in Lebanon.
- 16 December – Dolours Price, volunteer in the Provisional Irish Republican Army and political activist (died 2013).
- Denis Donaldson, volunteer in the Provisional Irish Republican Army, member of Sinn Féin, exposed in 2005 as an informer (died 2006).

== Deaths ==
- 20 July – Herbert Dixon, 1st Baron Glentoran, Unionist politician (born 1880).
- James Sleator, painter (born 1889).

== See also ==
- 1950 in Scotland
- 1950 in Wales
