= 1954 in Ireland =

- Centuries: 18th; 19th; 20th; 21st
- Decades: 1930s; 1940s; 1950s; 1960s; 1970s
- See also: 1954 in Northern Ireland; Other events of 1954; List of years in Ireland

Events from the year 1954 in Ireland.

== Incumbents ==
- President: Seán T. O'Kelly
- Taoiseach:
  - Éamon de Valera (FF) (until 2 June 1954)
  - John A. Costello (FG) (from 2 June 1954)
- Tánaiste:
  - Seán Lemass (FF) (until 2 June 1954)
  - William Norton (Lab) (from 2 June 1954)
- Minister for Finance:
  - Seán MacEntee (FF) (until 2 June 1954)
  - Gerard Sweetman (FG) (from 2 June 1954)
- Chief Justice: Conor Maguire
- Dáil:
  - 14th (until 23 April 1954)
  - 15th (from 2 June 1954)
- Seanad:
  - 7th (until 7 July 1954)
  - 8th (from 22 July 1954)

== Events ==
- 1 January – 1954 was the first Marian year. There were many events and devotions to Mary, mother of Jesus, and shrines and statues were erected in public places.
- 11 January – The Irish Council of the European Movement was formed in Dublin.
- 19 January – The government announced that the new Cork Airport would be built at Ballygarvan, County Cork.
- 19 February – Captain Henry Harrison, the last surviving member of the party led by Charles Stewart Parnell, died aged 87.
- 20 April – Murderer Michael Manning, aged 25, was executed in Mountjoy Prison. He was the last person to be judicially executed in the state.
- 5 May – At its headquarters in Kingsbridge, transport company CIÉ signed a £4.75 million contract to replace its steam locomotives with diesels.
- 16 May – Thirty thousand people marched through Dublin in a Marian year procession, the city's greatest display of Catholic faith since the Eucharistic congress of 1932.
- 18 May – 1954 Irish general election: The Fianna Fáil party lost four seats. The second inter-party government under John A. Costello came to power when the members of the 15th Dáil assembled on 2 June.
- 25 May – Joe 'Spud' Murphy established Tayto crisps in two rented rooms on O'Rahilly's Parade, off Moore Street, Dublin
- 12 June – An Irish Republican Army (IRA) unit carried out a successful arms raid on Gough Barracks in Armagh, signalling the renewal of IRA activity following a long hiatus.
- 28 June – Alfie Byrne was elected Lord Mayor of Dublin for the tenth time.
- 5 July – Dublin Corporation decided that Nelson's Pillar on O'Connell Street in Dublin would not be removed.
- 5 September – Twenty seven people died when KLM Flight 633 crashed two minutes after leaving Shannon Airport.
- 8 September – Marian College, Dublin opened for the first time.
- 8 December – A period of heavy rain, combined with a spring tide, causes heavy flooding on the River Tolka in Dublin. There are two fatalities.
- Undated
  - Entrepreneur Joe "Spud" Murphy (1923–2001) established the Tayto company to manufacture crisps.
  - The Evening Press newspaper was launched in Dublin.

== Arts and literature ==
- 16 June – The first public celebration of Bloomsday took place in Dublin. Writers Flann O'Brien, Patrick Kavanagh, and Anthony Cronin travelled in a horse-drawn coach stopping at numerous pubs to retrace the steps of the characters from James Joyce's novel Ulysses.
- 16 October – A marble plaque was unveiled at Westland Row, Dublin, to mark the centenary of the birth of writer Oscar Wilde.
- 19 November – Brendan Behan's first play, The Quare Fellow, premièred at the Pike Theatre, Dublin.
- The first Cork International Choral and Folk Dance Festival was held.
- English-born painter Derek Hill settled at St Columb's Rectory, near Churchill, County Donegal.
- Publication of Christy Brown's autobiography My Left Foot.
- Publication of Iris Murdoch's first novel, Under the Net.

== Sport ==
=== Association football ===
League of Ireland
Winners: Shamrock Rovers

FAI Cup
Winners: Drumcondra 1–0 St Patrick's Athletic.

== Births ==
- 3 January – Fintan Cullen, art historian and writer.
- 10 January – Bairbre de Brún, Sinn Féin Member of the European Parliament (MEP) and first Sinn Féin politician to represent Northern Ireland in the European Parliament.
- 22 January – Ger Fennelly, Kilkenny hurler.
- 26 January – Sean O'Callaghan, Provisional Irish Republican Army member and Garda Síochána informer (died in 2017).
- 8 March – Dermot Keely, soccer player and manager.
- 12 March – Francis Martin O'Donnell, United Nations official.
- 6 April – Billy Fitzpatrick, Kilkenny hurler.
- 11 April – Michael Lyster, RTÉ sports broadcaster.
- 15 April – Michael Willis, only official IRA member to escape from Crumlin Road prison.
- 25 April – Róisín Shortall, Labour Party Teachta Dála (TD) for Dublin North-West.
- 29 April – Gavan O'Herlihy, actor.
- 30 April – Gerry Daly, soccer player.
- 5 May – Ger Henderson, Kilkenny hurler.
- 13 May – Johnny Logan, singer and songwriter (born in Australia).
- 25 May – Daragh O'Malley, actor.
- 6 June – Tim O'Reilly, computer software promoter.
- 6 July – Tim Kennelly, Gaelic footballer with Kerry (died 2005).
- 23 July – Arthur Morgan, Provisional Irish Republican Army prisoner, Sinn Féin TD for Louth.
- 27 July – Pat Delaney, Offaly hurler.
- 28 July – Mikey Sheehy, Gaelic footballer (Kerry).
- 3 August – George Birmingham, Fine Gael politician.
- 5 August – Paddy Glackin, fiddle player.
- 12 August – Brian Cody, Kilkenny hurler, manager.
- 22 August – Jimmy Barry-Murphy, hurler and Gaelic footballer (St. Finbarr's, Cork, Munster).
- 8 September – Áine Brady, Fianna Fáil TD for Kildare North.
- 3 October – Mick Holden, Gaelic footballer and hurler (died in 2007).
- 8 October – Tony Ward, international rugby player and sports journalist.
- 16 October
  - Bertie Óg Murphy, Cork hurler and manager.
  - Noel Slevin, journalist.
- 2 November – Martin Cullen, Fianna Fáil TD representing Waterford and Cabinet Minister.
- 11 December – Noel Lane, Galway hurler and manager.
- 17 December – Síle de Valera, Fianna Fáil TD representing Clare, Minister and MEP.

- Catherine Dunne, novelist.
- Harry O'Donoghue, musician and songwriter.
- Eugene Sheehy, Group Chief Executive of Allied Irish Bank Plc.

== Deaths ==
- 2 February – Áine Ceannt, revolutionary activist and humanitarian (born 1880).
- 20 April – Michael Manning, carter, convicted of murder and hanged, last person executed in the Republic of Ireland (born 1929).
- 1 May – James Macmahon, civil servant and businessman, Under-Secretary for Ireland from 1918 to 1922 (born 1865).
- 2 May – Elinor Darwin, engraver and portrait painter (born 1871).
- 20 May – Roger Sweetman, barrister-at-law, member of First Dáil representing North Wexford (born 1874).
- 8 July – George Gardiner, boxer (born 1877).
- 11 September – R. M. Smyllie, editor of The Irish Times (born 1894 in Scotland).
- 16 September – James G. Douglas, member of the 1922 Seanad (born 1887).
- 21 October – T. V. Honan, merchant, Fianna Fáil member of the Seanad (born 1878).
