= 1940 in Ireland =

- Centuries: 18th; 19th; 20th; 21st
- Decades: 1920s; 1930s; 1940s; 1950s; 1960s
- See also: 1940 in Northern Ireland; Other events of 1940; List of years in Ireland

Events from the year 1940 in Ireland.

== Incumbents ==
- President: Douglas Hyde
- Taoiseach: Éamon de Valera (FF)
- Tánaiste: Seán T. O'Kelly (FF)
- Minister for Finance: Seán T. O'Kelly (FF)
- Chief Justice: Timothy Sullivan
- Dáil: 10th
- Seanad: 3rd

== Events ==
- January – The Irish Naval Service acquired the first of its six motor torpedo boats, the M1.
- 3 January – Tomás Óg Mac Curtain shot and mortally wounded Detective Garda Síochána John Roche in Cork city centre. He had been disarmed by Garda Pat Malone in 1935. He was spared the death penalty in view of his father's history.
- 17 January – The Enid (Captain Wibe) of neutral Norway sailing from Steinkjer to Dublin, 10 miles north of Shetland, went to assist SS Polzella which had been torpedoed by German submarine U-25 which then shelled and sank Enid.
- 7 February
  - The hanging in Birmingham of two Irish Republican Army men for their part in the 1939 Coventry bombing, despite appeals by Éamon de Valera for commutation of their sentence, led to widespread public protest and mourning in Ireland.
  - The Munster (Captain R. Paisley) was mined and sunk in the Irish Sea while entering Liverpool.
- 9 February – The case State (Burke) v. Lennon in the Supreme Court of Ireland, confirmed that internment without trial under the Offences against the State Act 1939 was unconstitutional. The government had to enact the Offences Against the State (Amendment) Act, 1940 to reinstate the provisions.
- 3 March
  - Flooding of Poulaphouca Reservoir was begun by damming the River Liffey at Poulaphouca as part of the Electricity Supply Board project to build Ireland's second hydroelectricity generating station, together with an improved water supply for Dublin.
  - The British Cato (Captain Richard Martin) sailing from Dublin to Bristol, struck a mine 2½ miles west of Nash Point: 13 died, 2 survived.
- 9 March – The trawler Leukos was sunk by gunfire from German submarine U-38, northwest of Tory Island – 11 died. (She may have moved between the surfacing U-boat and English trawlers, in the hope that the Irish tricolour would protect her while the English escaped.)
- 10 March – The City of Bremen rescued 33 crew of the Amor (Dutch) in the North Sea.
- 29 March – Fire destroyed the roof and upper rooms of St. Patrick's College, Maynooth.
- 20–24 April – Plan Kathleen, an Irish Republican Army (IRA) plan for a Nazi German invasion of Northern Ireland, was presented to the Abwehr (German military-intelligence service).
- April – Two men died on hunger strike for political status in Mountjoy Jail, Dublin.
- 4 May – Operation Mainau: German agent Hermann Görtz parachuted into Ireland to make contact with the IRA.
- 24 May – The first secret meeting to formulate 'Plan W' – joint action in the event of a Nazi invasion of Ireland – was held between Irish officials and the British military in London.
- 27 May
  - The Churchill war ministry in London agreed to seek co-operation from Taoiseach Éamon de Valera and the creation of an All-Ireland Council during "the present emergency" (World War II).
  - The Uruguay of neutral Argentina, sailing from Rosario to Limerick with 6,000 tons of maize, sank with scuttling charges by German submarine U-37 160 miles from Cape Villano: 15 died, 13 survived.
- 10 June – The Violando N Goulandris of neutral (at this time) Greece sailing from Santa Fe, Argentina to Waterford with a cargo of wheat was torpedoed by German submarine U-48 off Cape Finisterre: 6 died, 22 survived.
- 12 June – German submarine U-38 landed a German spy, Karl Simon, in Dingle. He was promptly arrested and interned for the duration of the war.
- 19 June – The Dublin Institute for Advanced Studies was established.
- 23 June – Minister Frank Aiken encouraged everyone to store food and water and to prepare a shelter in case of a direct hit.
- 2 July – The British-owned SS Arandora Star, carrying civilian internees and prisoners of war of Italian and German origin from Liverpool to Canada, was torpedoed and sunk by German submarine U-47 off northwest Ireland with the loss of around 865 lives.
- 4 July – Taoiseach Éamon de Valera announced that the policy of neutrality adopted the previous September would not be reversed.
- 7 July – Operation Lobster I: Three German agents were infiltrated into Ireland.
- 11 July – The Moyalla rescued twenty survivors from the British Athellaird off Cape Clear Island.
- 15 July
  - The City of Limerick (Captain R. Ferguson) was bombed by aircraft and sank in the Bay of Biscay, 700 miles west of Ushant – two died.
  - Republican Frank Ryan was released by the authorities of Francoist Spain from Burgos prison into the hands of the German Abwehr.
- 20 July – The City of Waterford (Captain T. Freehill) was shelled by submarine in North Atlantic, but escaped.
- 30 July – The Kyleclare rescued 52 survivors from the British Clan Menzies off the County Mayo coast.
- 1 August – The collier Kerry Head was bombed off Kinsale; she survived this attack (but see 22 October).
- 8 August
  - Operation Dove: Republicans Seán Russell and Frank Ryan embarked from Nazi Germany on German submarine U-65 for infiltration into Ireland, but Russell fell ill and died on the passage, and the operation was abandoned.
  - Operation Green (Unternehmen Grün), a proposed German invasion of the south of Ireland, was presented to Nazi German High Command as a diversion for Operation Sea Lion, the invasion of Britain planned at this time.
- 10 August – The British armed merchantman HMS Transylvania (F56) was torpedoed off Malin Head by German submarine U-56.
- 15 August – The Meath (Captain T. MacFariane) was mined and sunk off the South Stack, Holy Island, Anglesey; the crew was rescued by a local fishing trawler but 700 cattle were lost.
- 16 August – The Loch Ryan (Captain J. Nolan) was bombed off Land's End, but survived.
- 24 August – The City of Waterford (Captain T. Freehill) was bombed in Irish Sea but survived.
- 26 August – Five German bombs were dropped on County Wexford in a daylight raid. One hit the Shelbourne Co-operative Creamery in Campile, killing three women.
- 27 August – The Lanahrone rescued 18 survivors from the British Goathland off the County Kerry coast.
- 4 September
  - The Luimneach (Captain E. Jones) was sunk by gunfire from German submarine U-46 in the Bay of Biscay.
  - The Edenvale (Captain N. Gillespie) was machine-gunned by German plane off Waterford coast.
- 27 September – The Manchester Brigade was torpedoed off the Aran Islands.
- 3 October – The German news agency announced that the German government was willing to pay compensation for dropping bombs on Dublin.
- 22 October – The Kerry Head (Captain C. Drummond) was bombed again: all twelve hands were lost, in full view of watchers on Cape Clear Island.
- 26–28 October – RMS Empress of Britain, serving as a troopship under the British flag, was bombed, torpedoed and sunk off the Donegal coast with the loss of 45 lives. At 42,348 GRT she was the war's largest merchant ship loss.
- 7 November – Éamon de Valera, speaking in response to Winston Churchill's statement, said that there could be no question of handing over Irish ports for use by British forces while Britain retained control of Northern Ireland.
- 11 November – The Ardmore (Captain T. Ford) struck a mine off the Saltee Islands – 24 died.
- 22 November – The "Murder of Marlhill' took place in Knockgraffon near New Inn, County Tipperary.
- 24 November – James Craig, the first Prime Minister of Northern Ireland, died suddenly. He had been the longest continually serving Prime Minister in Europe.
- 19 December – Lightship tender Isolda (Captain A. Bestic) was sunk by German bombers within sight of Carnsore Point: six were killed, seven wounded.
- 20 December – This evening, two German bombs fell on Sandycove in Dublin, injuring three, and a third bomb fell near Carrickmacross in County Monaghan.
- 21 December – The Innisfallen (Captain G. Firth) hit a mine off the Wirral Peninsula near New Brighton, Merseyside while leaving Liverpool and sank; four died.
- 27 December – John McQuaid was consecrated as Roman Catholic Archbishop of Dublin and Primate of Ireland, an office he held for more than thirty years.

== Arts and literature ==
- 10 June – Christine Longford's historical play Lord Edward was premiered at the Gate Theatre, Dublin.
- 5 August – George Shiels' play The Rugged Path was premiered at the Abbey Theatre, Dublin.
- 4 October – Brian O'Nolan's first "Cruiskeen Lawn" humorous column was published in The Irish Times; from the second column he used the pseudonym 'Myles na gCopaleen'. The original columns were composed in Irish. He continued writing the column until his death in 1966.
- October – The Bell, a liberal monthly magazine of literature and social comment, was established in Dublin by Peadar O'Donnell under the editorship of Seán Ó Faoláin.
- Seán Ó Faoláin published his travelogue An Irish Journey and novel Come Back to Erin.
- Cecil Day-Lewis published Poems in Wartime and his translation of The Georgics of Virgil.
- Louis MacNeice's poetry collection The Last Ditch (including "The Coming of War" sequence) was published by Cuala Press in Dublin.
- Ewart Milne's poetry collection Letter from Ireland was published in Dublin.

== Sport ==
=== Association football ===
League of Ireland
Winners: St James' Gate
FAI Cup
Winners: Shamrock Rovers 3–0 Sligo Rovers.

=== Golf ===
- The Irish Open was not played due to The Emergency.

== Births ==
- 25 January – Philip Boyce, Roman Catholic bishop of the Diocese of Raphoe.
- 26 January – Séamus Hegarty, bishop of the Diocese of Raphoe, later bishop of the Diocese of Derry (died 2019).
- 2 February – Brendan Daly, Fianna Fáil Teachta Dála (TD) and Cabinet Minister, Senator (died 2023).
- 9 February – Seamus Deane, poet and novelist (died 2021).
- 1 March – Nuala O'Faolain, journalist and writer (died 2008).
- 15 March – David McMurtry, industrialist (died 2024).
- 22 March – Johnny Fullam, association footballer (died 2015).
- 27 March – Lorcan Allen, farmer and Fianna Fáil party TD for Wexford.
- 12 April – Dermot Fitzpatrick, Fianna Fáil TD (died 2022).
- 13 April – Frank O'Neill, association footballer.
- 20 April – Alfie Linehan, cricketer (died 2019).
- 23 April – Timothy Carroll, Roman Catholic bishop serving as Apostolic Vicar in the titular see of Tipasa in Mauretania.
- 28 April – Danny Doyle, folk singer (died 2019).
- 11 May – Mary Henry, member of the Seanad (1993–2007) representing Dublin University, and medical doctor.
- 15 May – Proinsias De Rossa, leader of the Workers' Party and Democratic Left, government minister and a Member of the European Parliament.
- 21 May – Ronan O'Rahilly, media entrepreneur (died 2020).
- 28 May – Maeve Binchy, novelist and columnist (died 2012).
- 29 May – Donal Murray, Bishop of Limerick.
- 6 June
  - Willie John McBride, international rugby player.
  - Michael Smith, Roman Catholic Bishop of Meath.
- 19 June – Brendan Ingle, boxing trainer (died 2018).
- 24 June – Adrian FitzGerald, 24th Knight of Kerry.
- 26 July – Tom Enright, Fine Gael party politician.
- 29 August – Dessie O'Halloran, singer (died 2019).
- 12 September – Des Foley, Gaelic footballer and hurler and Fianna Fáil party TD (died 1995).
- 19 October – Michael Gambon, actor (died 2023).
- 1 November
  - Michael Collins, Fianna Fáil party TD (died 2022).
  - John Keogh, association footballer.
- 6 November – Johnny Giles, association footballer and broadcaster.
- 17 November – Luke Kelly, folk singer, member of The Dubliners (died 1984).
- 29 November – Seán Cannon, folk musician.
- 1 December – Brendan Toal, Fine Gael party TD.
  Full dates unknown
  - Mick Carley, Gaelic footballer (died 2019).
  - Séamus Cleere, Kilkenny hurler.
  - Martin Coogan, Kilkenny hurler.
  - Phil Flynn, vice-president of the Sinn Féin party, businessman.
  - Nan Joyce, Irish Travellers' rights activist. (died 2018)
  - Mick Murphy, Tipperary hurler (died 2018).

== Deaths ==
- 2 January – William Harrington, cricketer (born 1869).
- 24 January – John Doogan, soldier, recipient of the Victoria Cross for gallantry in 1881 at Laing's Nek, South Africa (born 1853).
- 9 February – Edward Joseph Byrne, Roman Catholic Archbishop of Dublin (born 1872).
- 6 April – Samuel Shumack, farmer and author in Australia (born 1850).
- 3 June – Dan Lane, hurler (Aghabullogue, Cork) (born 1861).
- 17 June – Mark F. Ryan, nationalist and author (born 1844).
- 21 July – John Brunskill, cricketer (born 1875).
- 22 July – Peter Maher, boxer (born 1869).
- 14 August – Seán Russell, Irish republican and a chief of staff of the Irish Republican Army (born 1893).
- 21 September – Mick O'Brien, association footballer and manager (born 1893).
- 24 November – James Craig, 1st Viscount Craigavon, first Prime Minister of Northern Ireland (born 1871).
