= 1950 in Ireland =

- Centuries: 18th; 19th; 20th; 21st
- Decades: 1930s; 1940s; 1950s; 1960s; 1970s
- See also: 1950 in Northern Ireland; Other events of 1950; List of years in Ireland

Events from the year 1950 in Ireland.

== Incumbents ==
- President: Seán T. O'Kelly
- Taoiseach: John A. Costello (FG)
- Tánaiste: William Norton (Lab)
- Minister for Finance: Patrick McGilligan (FG)
- Chief Justice: Conor Maguire
- Dáil: 13th
- Seanad: 6th

== Events ==
- 31 January – Heywood House in County Laois was extensively damaged in an accidental fire, which subsequently led to the demolition of the house.
- March – The Electricity Supply Board's turf-fired power station at Portarlington officially opened.
- 12 March – Llandow air disaster: 83 people died when a plane carrying Welsh rugby fans home from Belfast crashed in South Wales.
- 12 May – Nationalist senators and members of parliament in Northern Ireland asked the Government of Ireland to give Northern-elected representatives seats in Dáil Éireann and Seanad Éireann.
- 1 July – Sir Gilbert Laithwaite, hitherto British Representative to Ireland, became the first British Ambassador to Ireland. (Frederick Boland was the first Irish ambassador to the United Kingdom.)
- August – Future First Lady of the United States Jacqueline Bouvier paid her first visit to Ireland with her step-brother, Hugh D. Auchincloss, following her studies at the Sorbonne. She attended the Dublin Horse Show, visited the Abbey Theatre, and met the Taoiseach, John A. Costello. She and her brother also visited County Cork (where they kissed the Blarney Stone), as well as Galway, Kildare, Killarney, and Tipperary. Bouvier returned in 1955 as the wife of Senator John F. Kennedy, and returned once again in 1967.
- 11 August – At a meeting of the European Consultative Assembly in Strasbourg, Irish representatives voted against British Leader of the Opposition Winston Churchill's plan for a European army.

== Arts and literature ==
- 13 January – Siobhán McKenna starred in San Siobhán, her own translation of George Bernard Shaw's play Saint Joan into Irish.
- 2 November – George Bernard Shaw, playwright and critic, died aged 94 in England.
- American-born artist Helen Hooker (O'Malley) staged her first solo show, of sculpture at St Stephen's Green Gallery in Dublin.
- Canadian-born painter James Le Jeune settled in Ireland.
- The Chester Beatty Library was established in Dublin.

== Sport ==
=== Association football ===
League of Ireland
Winners: Cork Athletic

FAI Cup
Winners: Transport 2–2, 2–2, 3–1 Cork Athletic.

=== Gaelic Games ===
- Mayo were All Ireland Gaelic Football Champions.

=== Golf ===
- Irish Open was won by Ossie Pickworth (Australia).

== Births ==
- 24 January – Frank McDonald, journalist (died 2026).
- 30 January – Paddy Keenan, uilleann pipes player (died 2026).
- 25 February – Neil Jordan, film director/producer and fiction writer.
- 5 March – Patrick Cockburn, journalist.
- 12 March – Willie Duggan, rugby union player (died 2017).
- 18 March
  - Pat McDonnell, Cork hurler.
  - Bobby Miller, Gaelic footballer and manager (died 2006).
- 29 March – Miah Dennehy, soccer player.
- 21 April – Pádraig Horan, Offaly hurler.
- 12 May – Gabriel Byrne, actor.
- 17 May – Michael P. Kitt, Fianna Fáil TD for Galway East.
- 21 May – Marian Finucane, broadcast presenter (died 2020).
- 22 May – Bill Whelan, composer of Riverdance.
- 25 May – John Horgan, Cork hurler.
- 1 June – Gemma Craven, actress.
- 23 June – Éamon Ó Cuív, Fianna Fáil TD for Galway West, Minister for Community, Rural and Gaeltacht Affairs.
- 24 June – Bob Carlos Clarke, photographer (died 2006).
- 29 June – Vere Wynne-Jones, journalist, sports broadcaster (died 2006).
- 17 July – Michael Colgan, director, Gate Theatre.
- 1 August
  - Martin Coleman, Cork hurler.
  - Cyril Farrell, Galway hurling manager.
  - Frances Fitzgerald, 24th Tánaiste of Ireland
- 3 August – Mick Flavin, country music singer.
- 12 August
  - John Carty, Fianna Fáil TD and senator.
  - Patrick Parfrey, nephrologist and clinical epidemiologist in Canada.
- 14 August – Dermot Desmond, businessman and entrepreneur.
- 23 August – David Molony, lawyer, Fine Gael TD and senator (died 2002).
- 26 August – Don Baker, singer songwriter.
- 29 August – Dick Spring, Tánaiste, leader of the Labour Party and Cabinet Minister.
- 5 September
  - Brendan Cummins, Cork hurler.
  - Máire Geoghegan-Quinn, member European Court of Auditors, Fianna Fáil TD and Cabinet Minister.
- 5 October – Michael Gaughan, Provisional Irish Republican Army hunger striker (died in Parkhurst Prison in 1974).
- 6 December – Jan O'Sullivan, Labour Party TD for Limerick East.
- 10 December
  - Desmond Hogan, writer.
  - Mícheál Ó Súilleabháin, musician (died 2018).
- 16 December – Dolours Price, political activist and Provisional Irish Republican Army member (died 2013).
- 25 December – Noël Treanor, Roman Catholic archbishop (died 2024).
  Full date unknown

- Pat Hartigan, Limerick hurler.
- Edmund Lenihan, author, storyteller, lecturer and broadcaster.
- Séamus Looney, Cork Gaelic footballer and hurler.
- Mick Malone, Cork hurler.
- Michael Warren, sculptor.

== Deaths ==
- 24 March – Robert Johnston, soldier, recipient of the Victoria Cross for gallantry in 1899 at the Battle of Elandslaagte, South Africa (born in 1872).
- 22 April – John T. McNicholas, Archbishop of Roman Catholic Archdiocese of Cincinnati and founder of the Catholic Legion of Decency (born in 1877).
- 26 April – R. A. Stewart Macalister, archaeologist (born in 1870).
- 10 May – Art O'Connor, Sinn Féin MP, member of First Dáil, cabinet minister, lawyer and judge (born in 1888).
- 11 June – Stephen Gwynn, journalist, writer, poet and Nationalist politician (born in 1864).
- 25 June – Muiris Ó Súilleabháin, writer (born in 1904).
- 2 July – George Edward Pugin Meldon, cricketer (born in 1875).
- 20 July – Herbert Dixon, 1st Baron Glentoran, Unionist politician (born in 1880).
- 13 September – Sara Allgood, actress (born in 1879).
- 13 October – Hugh Godley, 2nd Baron Kilbracken, barrister (born in 1877).
- 2 November – George Bernard Shaw, playwright and winner of the Nobel Prize for Literature (1925) (born in 1856).
- 9 November – Diarmuid Lynch, member of First Dáil representing South East Cork.
- 1 December – E. J. Moeran, composer (born in 1894).
- 26 December – James Stephens, novelist and poet (born in 1882).
  Full date unknown

- Patrick Keohane, navy officer, member of Robert Falcon Scott's Antarctic Terra Nova Expedition (born in 1879).
- James Sleator, painter (born in 1889).
