= 1951 in Ireland =

- Centuries: 18th; 19th; 20th; 21st
- Decades: 1930s; 1940s; 1950s; 1960s; 1970s
- See also: 1951 in Northern Ireland; Other events of 1951; List of years in Ireland

Events from the year 1951 in Ireland.

== Incumbents ==
- President: Seán T. O'Kelly
- Taoiseach:
  - John A. Costello (FG) (until 13 June 1951)
  - Éamon de Valera (FF) (from 13 June 1951)
- Tánaiste:
  - William Norton (Lab) (until 13 June 1951)
  - Seán Lemass (FF) (from 13 June 1951)
- Minister for Finance:
  - Patrick McGilligan (FG) (until 13 June 1951)
  - Seán MacEntee (FF) (from 13 June 1951)
- Chief Justice: Conor Maguire
- Dáil:
  - 13th (until 7 May 1951)
  - 14th (from 13 June 1951)
- Seanad:
  - 6th (until 25 July 1951)
  - 7th (from 14 August 1951)

== Events ==
- 2 February – Éamon de Valera visited Newry for the first time since his arrest there in 1924.
- 11 April – Minister for Health Noel Browne resigned and his Mother and Child Scheme was overturned.
- 19 April – The Attorney General for Northern Ireland, Ed Warnock, referring to Noel Browne's resignation, said that Ireland is really ruled by Maynooth (i.e. by the Catholic Church).
- 24 May – Gardaí (police) exchanged shots with two men after they threw a bomb at the British Embassy in Dublin.
- 30 May – 1951 Irish general election: Fianna Fáil won most seats but lacked an overall majority.
- 13 June – Members of the 14th Dáil assembled. Éamon de Valera became Taoiseach with one of the smallest majorities on record (74–69), forming a Fianna Fáil government with the support of independents.
- 1 July – Taoiseach Éamon de Valera paid his first visit to Derry in 25 years.
- July – The last boat to use the Royal Canal commercially, owned by Willie Leech, ceased trading.
- 15 November – The Nobel Prize for Physics was awarded jointly to Professor Ernest Walton of Trinity College Dublin and Sir John Cockcroft.

== Arts and literature ==
- 18 July – The Abbey Theatre in Dublin was burnt to the ground.
- 30 July–22 September – The now-homeless Abbey Theatre company performed a season at the Rupert Guinness Hall in the Guinness Brewery before moving to the Queen's Theatre, Dublin.
- 15 August – Donagh MacDonagh's ballad opera God's Gentry opened at the Belfast Arts Theatre, transferring to the Gate Theatre, Dublin on 26 December.
- 21 October–4 November – The first Wexford "Festival of Music and the Arts", predecessor of Wexford Festival Opera.
- The first national festival of the folk music of Ireland was held in Mullingar.
- Comhaltas Ceoltóirí Éireann was established in Mullingar by a group of uilleann pipers to promote the folk music and language of Ireland.
- Samuel Beckett's novel Molloy was published in French.
- Sinéad de Valera's collection for children The Emerald Ring and Other Irish Fairy Stories was published.
- The Dolmen Press was established in Dublin by Liam and Josephine Miller to publish Irish literature.
- Louis le Brocquy painted A Family.
- Daniel O'Neill painted Knockalla Hills, Donegal and Western Landscape.

== Sport ==
=== Association football ===
League of Ireland
Winners: Cork Athletic

FAI Cup
Winners: Transport 1–1, 1–0 Shelbourne.

=== Boxing ===
- 8 June – Jack Doyle defeated America's 'Beer Baron' Two-Ton Tony Gelanto at Tolka Park.

=== GAA ===
Mayo successfully defended All-Ireland Senior Football Championship Final by defeating Meath 2–8 to 0–9.

=== Golf ===
- Irish Open – no tournament held.

== Births ==
- 4 January – Paddy Roche, soccer player.
- 25 January – M. J. Nolan, Fianna Fáil TD for Carlow–Kilkenny and Senator.
- 27 January – Brian Downey, drummer.
- 4 February – Patrick Bergin, actor.
- 6 February – Margo, singer.
- 14 February – Alan Shatter, Fine Gael TD for Dublin South.
- 1 March – J. P. McManus, businessman and racehorse owner.
- 16 March – John Egan, Dublin GAA County Chairman (died 2007).
- 25 March – Gerard Murphy, Fine Gael TD representing Cork North-West.
- 4 April – Alan Hughes, cricketer.
- 24 April – Enda Kenny, leader of Fine Gael, TD for Mayo.
- 1 May – Michael McDowell, founding member of Progressive Democrats, TD, Cabinet Minister and Attorney-General.
- 10 May – Ger Canning, Gaelic Athletic Association hurling and football commentator.
- 21 May
  - Adrian Hardiman, justice of the Supreme Court of Ireland (died 2016).
  - Ray O'Brien, soccer player.
- 23 May – Viscount Slane, later The Marquess Conyngham, pop concert promoter.
- 26 May – Madeleine Taylor-Quinn, Fine Gael TD, councillor.
- 6 June – Frank Fahey, Fianna Fáil TD for Galway West.
- 10 June – Joe McKenna, Limerick hurler and manager.
- 12 June – Nóirín Ní Riain, singer, musician, writer and theologian.
- 27 June – Mary McAleese, eighth President of Ireland.
- July – Anne Colley, Progressive Democrats politician.
- August – Peter Mathews, TD representing Dublin South and economic commentator (died 2017).
- 30 August – Dana Rosemary Scallon, singer, Eurovision Song Contest winner and Member of the European Parliament.
- 1 September – Geraldine Kennedy, journalist, politician and first female editor of The Irish Times.
- 12 September – Bertie Ahern, Taoiseach and leader of Fianna Fáil.
- 5 October – Bob Geldof, singer, songwriter and humanitarian.
- 18 December – Noel Treacy, Fianna Fáil TD for Galway East.
- 30 December – Gay Mitchell, TD representing Dublin South-Central, Member of the European Parliament for Dublin.
  Full date unknown

- John Aimers, educator and Chairman of the Monarchist League of Canada
- Yvonne Farrell, architect.

== Deaths ==
- 9 January – John Aston, cricketer (born 1882).
- 17 January – Alexander Haslett, independent TD (born 1883).
- 18 January – Amy Carmichael, Christian missionary and writer (born 1867).
- 26 January – Thomas Houghton, Anglican clergyman and editor of the Gospel Magazine (born 1859).
- 18 March – Thomas Foran, trade union official, member of the Seanad from 1922 to 1948.
- 27 March – James Geoghegan, Fianna Fáil TD, Minister for Justice, Attorney General of Ireland and judge of the Supreme Court (born 1886).
- 29 March – Ambrose Upton Gledstanes Bury, politician in Alberta, Canada (born 1869).
- 10 April – Nora Barnacle, wife of author James Joyce (born 1884).
- 12 April – Henry De Vere Stacpoole, ship's doctor and author (born 1863).
- 19 May – Frederick Barton Maurice, soldier, military correspondent, writer and academic, founded the British Legion in 1920 (born 1871).
- 10 June – Justice George Gavan Duffy, barrister, Sinn Féin Member of Parliament and a signatory of the Anglo-Irish Treaty in 1921 (born 1882).
- 21 June – Eugene O'Mahoney, museum curator and entomologist (born 1899).
- 24 July – Paddy Moore, soccer player (born 1909).
- 16 August – Gus Kelly, cricketer (born 1877).
- 17 August – Joseph Warwick Bigger, professor, member of the Dublin University constituency in the Seanad from 1944 to 1951.
- 25 August – John J. McGrath, Democratic U.S. Representative from California (born 1872).
- 27 November – George Meldon, cricketer (born 1885).
  Full date unknown

- Margot Ruddock, actress, poet and singer (born 1907).
