= 1948 in Ireland =

- Centuries: 18th; 19th; 20th; 21st
- Decades: 1920s; 1930s; 1940s; 1950s; 1960s
- See also: 1948 in Northern Ireland; Other events of 1948; List of years in Ireland

Events from the year 1948 in Ireland.

== Incumbents ==
- President: Seán T. O'Kelly
- Taoiseach:
  - Éamon de Valera (FF) (until 18 February 1948)
  - John A. Costello (FG) (from 18 February 1948)
- Tánaiste:
  - Seán Lemass (FF) (until 18 February 1948)
  - William Norton (Lab) (from 18 February 1948)
- Minister for Finance:
  - Frank Aiken (FF) (until 18 February 1948)
  - Patrick McGilligan (FG) (from 18 February 1948)
- Chief Justice: Conor Maguire
- Dáil:
  - 12th (until 12 January 1948)
  - 13th (from 18 February 1948)
- Seanad:
  - 5th (until 12 March 1948)
  - 6th (from 21 April 1948)

== Events ==
=== January ===
- 8 January – The Council of State met for the first time when President Sean T. O'Kelly tested the constitutionality of the Offences Against the State Bill.
- 15 January – Gas rationing ended in Dublin for the first time since 1942.

=== February ===
- 4 February – 1948 Irish general election: The Fianna Fáil party under Éamon de Valera remained the largest party, but lacked an overall majority.
- 15 February – At the Mansion House, Dublin, a plan was drawn up which resulted in John A. Costello being elected taoiseach.
- 18 February – Members of the 13th Dáil assembled. De Valera was voted out of office as taoiseach after 16 years and John A. Costello was elected to succeed him as the country's second prime minister. An inter-party government of the 13th Dáil was formed, the first change of government since 1932.
- 25 February – The Minister for Health, Noel Browne, announced his emergency drive against tuberculosis.
- 27 February – The government asked the Aerlínte Éireann airline to postpone its inaugural transatlantic service due to high costs.

=== March ===
- 7 March – The Minister for External Affairs, Seán MacBride, recommended an economic or customs union between the two parts of Ireland, North and South.
- 11 March – A fire at Shannon Airport destroyed the control tower.
- 16 March – Seán MacBride represented Ireland at the Marshall Aid conference in Paris.

=== April ===
- 3 April – British officer Captain Edo John Hitzen returned a Flag of Truce surrendered at the Boland's Mill garrison during the 1916 Easter Rising. He also discussed his capture of Éamon de Valera, and returned his binoculars to him.
- 15 April — Pan American World Airways flight 1-10 suffered a controlled flight into terrain just short of the runway at Shannon Airport. Thirty of the Thirty-one passengers and crew were killed.

=== June ===
- 18 June – A 36-foot shark was spotted off the coast of County Donegal.

=== August ===
- 22 August – The Dwyer McAllister Cottage at Dernamuck in the Glen of Imaal, County Wicklow (scene of rebel leader Michael Dwyer's escape from British troops in 1799), was handed over to the Irish State by the Hoxey family, with President Seán T. O'Kelly, Éamon de Valera, and other dignitaries present at the ceremonial handover.

=== September ===
- 7 September – In Ottawa, Canada Taoiseach John A. Costello announced that the government intended to repeal the 1936 External Relations Act, thus severing the last constitutional link with Britain.
- 13 September – Five hundred people attended a commemoration of the Irish Rebellion of 1798 on the hills overlooking Belfast.
- 17 September – The body of poet W. B. Yeats (died 1939) was carried home from France on the Irish naval corvette LÉ Macha for reburial in Drumcliff, County Sligo.
- 22 September – Taoiseach John A. Costello was presented with an honorary doctorate of law from the Jesuit Fordham University in New York City.

=== October ===
- 17 October – At the request of the British Prime Minister Clement Attlee, the Minister for Finance, Seán MacBride, and the Minister for External Affairs, Patrick McGilligan, met representatives from the United Kingdom, Canada, Australia and New Zealand to discuss the repeal of the External Relations Act.
- 26 October – A final ruling in the Sinn Féin Funds case decided that the Sinn Féin party, as reconstituted in 1923, was "not in any legal sense a continuation" of the party that had "melted away" in 1922 and was thus unable to claim funds deposited in its name in the High Court.

=== November ===
- 17 November – The Republic of Ireland Act 1948, which involved the repeal of the External Relations Act, was introduced in Dáil Éireann.
- 25 November – The Republic of Ireland Bill was passed in Dáil Éireann.

=== December ===
- 21 December – President Seán T. O'Kelly signed the Republic of Ireland Bill at a ceremony at Áras an Uachtaráin, the president's residence. Taoiseach John A. Costello and members of his government were also present.

=== Full date unknown ===
- An Taisce, the National Trust for Ireland, was founded in June, with naturalist Robert Lloyd Praeger as its first President.
- The "Blue Hussars", the ceremonial Mounted Escort of the Irish Army, were disbanded.
- The Irish Farmers Journal was launched.
- The Statue of Queen Victoria in front of Leinster House, which had been installed in 1908, was removed by government and placed in storage

== Arts and literature ==
- May – the Music Association of Ireland was established by a group of composers (including Brian Boydell, Aloys Fleischmann, and Frederick May) and music lovers to promote classical music in Ireland.

=== Full date unknown ===
- Brian Boydell's first major success, In Memoriam Mahatma Gandhi, Opus 30, was premiered by the Radio Éireann Symphony Orchestra under the composer's baton at the Phoenix Hall, Dublin.
- Robert Farren published his critical work, The Course of Irish Verse in English.
- Patrick Kavanagh published his novel Tarry Flynn.

== Sport ==
=== Association football ===
League of Ireland
Winners:Drumcondra

FAI Cup
Winners: Shamrock Rovers 2 – 1 Drumcondra.

=== Golf ===
- The Irish Open was won by Dai Rees from Wales.

== Births ==
=== January ===
- 1 January – Johnny Brady, Fianna Fáil party Teachta Dála (TD) for Meath West.
- 29 January – Pat Kenny, presenter of The Late Late Show on television.
- 30 January – Paul Magee, IRA volunteer.

=== February ===
- 10 February – John Magnier, businessman and leading thoroughbred stud owner.
- 16 February
  - Séamus Brennan, Fianna Fáil TD and government minister.
  - John Fleming, Roman Catholic Bishop of Killala (2002–2024).
- 18 February – Sinéad Cusack, actress.

=== March ===
- 2 March – Rory Gallagher, guitarist (died 1995).
- 10 March – Pat "the Cope" Gallagher, Fianna Fáil TD for Donegal South-West, Minister of State and member of the European Parliament.
- 30 March – Eddie Jordan, racing driver, team owner and television presenter (died 2025).

=== April ===
- 7 April – Maurice FitzGerald, 9th Duke of Leinster, peer.
- 21 April – Clare Boylan, author, journalist and critic (died 2006).

=== May ===
- 25 May – Seán FitzPatrick, banker (died 2021).
- 26 May – Kate Cruise O'Brien, writer (died 1998).

=== June ===
- 13 June – Darina Allen, chef and television personality.
- 14 June – John Connolly, Galway hurler.
- 24 June – Anita Reeves, actress (died 2016).

=== July ===
- 27 July – Moss Keane, international rugby player.

=== August ===
- 6 August – Mick Leech, association football player.
- 19 August – Christy O'Connor Jnr, golfer (died 2016).
- 20 August – Michael Halliday, cricketer.
- 30 August – Donnacha O'Dea, Olympic swimmer, professional poker player.
- 31 August – Tony Martin, politician in Canada.

=== September ===
- 14 September – Ned Byrne, Kilkenny hurler.
- 20 September – Tommy Peoples, fiddler (died 2018).

=== October ===
- 15 October – Chris de Burgh, singer and songwriter.
- 23 October – Gerry Robinson, businessman and television presenter.

=== November ===
- 9 November – Ray Cummins, Cork Gaelic footballer and hurler.

=== Full date unknown ===
- Dónal Clifford, Cork hurler.
- Dermot Healy, hurling manager.
- Teddy Holland, Gaelic football manager.
- Frank Norberg, Cork hurler.
- Jackie Tabick, reform rabbi, first female rabbi in Britain or Ireland.
- Willie Walsh, Cork hurler.

== Deaths ==
=== February ===
- 9 February – John M. O'Sullivan, Cumann na nGaedheal party TD and cabinet minister (born 1881).
- 12 February – Armar Lowry-Corry, 5th Earl Belmore, High Sheriff and Deputy Lieutenant of County Fermanagh (born 1870).
- 21 February – Annie M. P. Smithson, nurse, novelist, poet and nationalist (born 1873).
- 23 February – John Robert Gregg, creator of Gregg Shorthand (born 1867).

=== March ===
- 12 March – George Noble Plunkett, nationalist, politician, museum curator (born 1851).
- 25 March – Bridget Sullivan, domestic housemaid for Borden family of Fall River, Massachusetts (born 1866).

=== May ===
- 7 May – James Nathaniel Halbert, entomologist (born 1871).
- 9 May – Eddie Doyle, Kilkenny hurler (born 1897).
- 15 May – Edward J. Flanagan, popularly known as Father Flanagan, founder of Boys Town in Nebraska (born 1886).

=== June ===
- 18 June – Conal Holmes O'Connell O'Riordan, dramatist and novelist (born 1874).

=== August ===
- 13 August – Edwin Maxwell, actor (born 1886).
- 27 August – Cissie Cahalan, trade unionist, feminist and suffragette (born 1876).

=== September ===
- 10 September – Bernard Forbes, 8th Earl of Granard, soldier and politician (born 1874).

=== October ===
- 30 October – Neal Blaney, Fianna Fáil TD and senator (born 1893).

=== November ===
- 21 November – James O'Mara, Irish Parliamentary Party and Sinn Féin party member of parliament (MP) (born 1873).
- 28 November – D. D. Sheehan, journalist, barrister, author, Irish Parliamentary Party MP representing Mid Cork (1901–1918), one of four MPs to serve in the 16th (Irish) Division in World War I (born 1873).
- 30 November – J. J. Walsh, Sinn Féin MP, member of the First Dáil, a founder-member of the Cumann na nGaedheal party, and cabinet minister (born 1880).

=== December ===
- 9 December – Sir Tim O'Brien, 3rd Baronet, cricketer (born 1861).
