= 1944 in Ireland =

- Centuries: 18th; 19th; 20th; 21st
- Decades: 1920s; 1930s; 1940s; 1950s; 1960s
- See also: 1944 in Northern Ireland; Other events of 1944; List of years in Ireland

Events from the year 1944 in Ireland.

== Incumbents ==
- President: Douglas Hyde
- Taoiseach: Éamon de Valera (FF)
- Tánaiste: Seán T. O'Kelly (FF)
- Minister for Finance: Seán T. O'Kelly (FF)
- Chief Justice: Timothy Sullivan
- Dáil:
  - 11th (until 7 June 1944)
  - 12th (from 9 June 1944)
- Seanad:
  - 4th (until 5 July 1944)
  - 5th (from 18 August 1944)

== Events ==
=== January ===
- 26 January – W. T. Cosgrave officially resigned as leader of the Fine Gael party.

=== March ===
- 10 March – The United States alleged that Ireland's neutrality was operating in favour of the Axis powers during World War II.
- 13 March – Winston Churchill banned travel and communication between Britain and Ireland, north and south.
- 22 March – The Cymric (Captain C. Cassidy) was lost between Ardrossan and Lisbon: 11 dead.
- 30 March – The first Dunnes Stores opened.

=== June ===
- 1 June – General election: The ruling Fianna Fáil party under Éamon de Valera gained a majority of 14 seats over all other parties. The 12th Dáil assembled on 9 June.
- 3 June – Maureen Flavin (Sweeney after marriage) recorded weather conditions at Blacksod Lighthouse, County Mayo indicating an approaching storm, which led to the 24-hour postponement of the Allied D-Day landings from 5 June to 6 June. The United States House of Representatives honoured Sweeney in 2021 with a medal and proclamation for her vital role in World War II.
- 7 June – The Minister for Supplies, Seán Lemass, announced further rationing of electricity.

=== July ===
- 21 July – The Irish Fir (Captain J.P. Kelly) reported a 'near miss' torpedo attack in the North Atlantic.

=== August ===
- 22 August – Men from counties Tyrone and Fermanagh formed an Anti-Partition League in Dublin.

=== November ===
- 29 November – The Chief Genealogical Officer issued County Dublin with a coat of arms, the first county to receive such a distinction.

=== Undated ===
- Dr. John Dignan, Roman Catholic Bishop of Clonfert, published Social Security: Outlines of a Scheme of National Health Insurance.
- Dr. James Deeny was appointed chief medical officer.

== Arts and literature ==
- January – An Túr Gloine, the Dublin-based cooperative studio for stained glass and opus sectile artists, active since 1903, closed down
- January – The White Stag group staged an exhibition of Subjective Art in Dublin.
- 28 August – Joseph Tomelty's play The End House (dealing with the Special Powers Act in Northern Ireland) premièred at the Abbey Theatre, Dublin.
- John M. Feehan founded the Cork-based publishing house Mercier Press.
- John Lynch's De praesulibus Hiberniae (written in 1672) was first published, in Dublin.
- Frank O'Connor's short story collection Crab Apple Jelly was published.

== Sport ==
=== Association football ===
League of Ireland
Winners: Shelbourne
FAI Cup
Winners: Shamrock Rovers 3–2 Shelbourne.

=== Gaelic football ===
All Ireland Final
Winners: Roscommon GAA

=== Golf ===
- The Irish Open was not played due to The Emergency (World War II).

== Births ==
- 2 January – Martin Drennan, bishop of the Diocese of Galway and Kilmacduagh.
- 5 January
  - Ivan Cooper, co-founder of the Social Democratic and Labour Party (SDLP) (Northern Ireland) (died 2019).
  - Edward Haughey, Baron Ballyedmond, businessman and senator (killed in helicopter accident in England 2014).
  - Louis Stewart, jazz guitarist (died 2016)
- 7 January – Joe McGowan, historian, folklorist and author.
- 8 February – Brian Farrell, bishop in the Roman Curia.
- 22 February – Richard Higgins, Roman Catholic Titular Bishop of the Casae Calanae and an Auxiliary Bishop of the Archdiocese for the Military Services, USA.
- 10 April – Leo O'Reilly, Bishop of Kilmore (1998–2018).
- 8 May – Paddy O'Hanlon, barrister and SDLP politician (died 2009).
- 21 May
  - Gerry Murphy, association football coach.
  - Mary Robinson, first female President of Ireland (1990–1997), United Nations High Commissioner for Human Rights (1997–2002).
- 24 May
  - Ruth Dudley Edwards, historian.
  - Raymond Field, Roman Catholic auxiliary bishop in the Archdiocese of Dublin.
- 25 May – Tom Munnelly, folk-song collector (died 2007).
- 27 May – Hugh Lambert, journalist and editor (died 2005).
- 30 May – Liam Naughten, Fine Gael party politician, Cathaoirleach of Seanad Éireann from 1995 until his death in 1996.
- 1 June
  - Paul Coghlan, Fine Gael Senator.
  - Seymour Crawford, Fine Gael TD for Cavan–Monaghan.
- 5 June – Colm Wilkinson, singer and actor.
- 6 June – Paul Connaughton Snr, Fine Gael TD for Galway East.
- 29 June – Seán Doherty, Fianna Fáil party TD and cabinet minister (died 2005).
- 3 July – Tim O'Malley, Progressive Democrats party TD.
- 17 July – Vincent Browne, journalist, broadcaster.
- 31 July – David Norris, member of the Seanad representing Dublin University, founder of Campaign for Homosexual Law Reform (born in Belgian Congo).
- 3 August – Pearse Lyons, biochemist and businessman (died 2018).
- 7 August – Brendan McWilliams, meteorologist and science writer (died 2007).
- 9 August – Seán Barrett, Fine Gael TD, cabinet minister and Ceann Comhairle of Dáil Éireann (died 2026).
- 17 August – Peter Kelly, Fianna Fáil TD for Longford–Roscommon, later Longford–Westmeath (died 2019).
- 1 September
  - Pat Upton, Labour Party TD (died 1999).
  - Eamonn Walsh, Auxiliary Bishop of Dublin.
- 9 September – Bernard Allen, Fine Gael TD for Cork North-Central.
- 24 September – Eavan Boland, poet (died 2020).
- 1 October – Emmet Stagg, Labour Party TD for Kildare North.
- 16 October – Paul Durcan, poet.
- 19 October – Liam Lawlor, Fianna Fáil politician, resigned following a finding that he had failed to co-operate with a planning irregularities investigation (died 2005).
- 30 November – John Boland, senior Fine Gael politician (died 2000).
- 22 December – Patrick Nee, mobster and author in the United States.
- 23 December – Christina Noble, children's rights campaigner
- 28 December – Noel Ahern, Fianna Fáil TD for Dublin North-West and Minister of State at the Department of Finance with special responsibility for the Office of Public Works.
  Full date unknown

- Dermot Gallagher, civil servant and diplomat (died 2017).
- Tom Garvin, political scientist and historian.
- Tom Walsh, Kilkenny hurler.

== Deaths ==
- 16 February – Mainie Jellett, abstract painter (born 1897).
- 19 February – J. J. "Ginger" O'Connell, officer in the Irish Volunteers and Irish Defence Forces (born 1887).
- 15 March – Thomas Byrne, recipient of the Victoria Cross for gallantry in 1898 at the Battle of Omdurman, Sudan (born 1866).
- 25 April – Tony Mullane, Major League Baseball player (born 1859).
- 12 May – Edel Quinn, lay missionary (born 1907).
- 10 June – Frank Ryan, member of the Irish Republican Army, editor of An Phoblacht, leftist activist and leader of Irish volunteers on the Republican side in the Spanish Civil War (born 1902).
- August – Noble Huston, Presbyterian minister and dog breeder.
- 19 September – David Lord, Royal Air Force pilot, posthumous recipient of the Victoria Cross for gallantry at Arnhem (born 1913).
- 6 November – Walter Guinness, 1st Baron Moyne, British politician and businessman, assassinated in Cairo by the Zionist group Lehi (Stern Gang) (born 1880).
- 28 November – William Moore, Unionist member of parliament and Lord Chief Justice of Northern Ireland 1925–1937 (born 1864).
- 30 November – Eoin O'Duffy, leader in the Irish Republican Army, Garda Commissioner, first leader of Fine Gael and the Blueshirts, leader of the volunteer Francoist Irish Brigade (Spanish Civil War) and sports administrator (born 1890).
- 1 December – Charlie Kerins, Chief of Staff of the IRA, convicted of murder of Garda Síochána officer and hanged (born 1918).
