= 1949 in Ireland =

- Centuries: 18th; 19th; 20th; 21st
- Decades: 1920s; 1930s; 1940s; 1950s; 1960s
- See also: 1949 in Northern Ireland; Other events of 1949; List of years in Ireland

Events from the year 1949 in Ireland.

== Incumbents ==
- President: Seán T. O'Kelly
- Taoiseach: John A. Costello (FG)
- Tánaiste: William Norton (Lab)
- Minister for Finance: Patrick McGilligan (FG)
- Chief Justice: Conor Maguire
- Dáil: 13th
- Seanad: 6th

== Events ==
- 22 March – The Irish Government leased a residence in the Phoenix Park in Dublin to the United States government for a period of 99 years. It will be the residence of the United States ambassador.
- 17 April – At midnight, the 26 counties officially left the British Commonwealth under the terms of the Republic of Ireland Act 1948. A 21-gun salute on O'Connell Bridge, Dublin, ushered in the Republic of Ireland.
- 29 April – Major de Courcy Wheeler, the man who accepted the surrender of Patrick Pearse in 1916, presented President Seán T. O'Kelly with Pearse's revolver at a special function at the President's residence, Áras an Uachtaráin.
- 3 May – The Parliament of the United Kingdom passed the Ireland Act guaranteeing the position of Northern Ireland as part of the United Kingdom as long as a majority of its citizens want it to be. The government also recognised the existence of the Republic of Ireland.
- 10 May – Dáil Éireann passed a motion, "Protest Against Partition", which placed on record its "indignant protest against the introduction in the British Parliament of legislation purporting to endorse and continue the existing partition of Ireland".
- 13 May – John A. Costello, Éamon de Valera, William Norton, and Seán MacBride shared a platform to protest against the British government's attitude to the constitutional status of Northern Ireland.
- 25 May – Princess Elizabeth (later Queen Elizabeth II) and the Duke of Edinburgh received the freedom of Belfast during a visit to the city.
- 26 June – Eighty thousand members of the teetotal Pioneer Total Abstinence Society gathered in Croke Park in Dublin to affirm the pledge of abstinence from alcohol.
- 9 July – The last tram in Dublin ran from Nelson's Pillar to Blackrock and was the last tram in Dublin until the Luas tram service was inaugurated in 2004.
- 12 July – Douglas Hyde, first President of Ireland and founder of the Gaelic League, died in Dublin, aged 89.
- 24 August – Tánaiste William Norton told the European Consultative Assembly in Strasbourg that Ireland would not agree to a customs union of western European states.
- 8 November – Street names in any language other than English were prohibited by an Amendment to a Bill passed in the Senate of Northern Ireland.
- 20 November – Students and academic staff celebrated the centenary of University College Galway.
- The Electricity Supply Board completed its Liffey scheme, providing hydroelectricity generating stations at Poulaphouca, Golden Falls, and Leixlip, and a water supply reservoir for Dublin at Poulaphouca Reservoir.

=== Unknown date ===
- The Golden Vale Creameries company was founded in Charleville, County Cork.
- At this year's Convention, Irish Republican Army members were ordered to join Sinn Féin.
- Historians J. M. Hone and Maurice Craig undertook multiple journeys across County Dublin in 1949, writing of the histories of the areas they visited, and remarking on their present state at the time. The writings were later published as the 2002 book The New Neighbourhood of Dublin, with architect Michael Fewer retracing the routes and cataloguing the changes that had occurred in the intervening 50 years from 1949 to 2002.

== Arts and literature ==
- Publication of Máirtín Ó Cadhain's first novel, Cré na Cille ("Churchyard Clay", written 1944–45), illustrated by Charles Lamb.
- Publication of Máirtín Ó Direáin's first poetry collection, Rogha Dánta.
- Publication of Séamus Ó Néill's poetry for children, Dánta do Pháistí.
- Daniel O'Neill painted Place du Tertre and The Blue Skirt.

== Sport ==
=== Association football ===
==== Domestic ====
League of Ireland
Winners: Drumcondra

FAI Cup
Winners: Dundalk 3–0 Shelbourne.

==== Men's international matches ====
Friendly matches

- 24 April – Ireland 0–2 Belgium.
- 22 May – Ireland 1–0 Portugal.
- 12 June – Ireland 1–4 Spain.
- 21 September – England 0–2 Ireland. This was England's first home defeat by a non-British side.

World Cup 1950 qualifiers

- 2 June – Sweden 3–1 Ireland.
- 8 September – Ireland 3–0 Finland.
- 9 October – Finland 1–1 Ireland.
- 13 November – Ireland 1–3 Sweden.

=== Golf ===
- Irish Open was won by Harry Bradshaw (Ireland).

== Births ==
- 10 January – Michael Byrne (Old Man Belfield), a homeless man who lived on the campus of University College Dublin for the last 30, possibly 40 years of his life.
- 11 January – Billy Roche, playwright and writer.
- 16 January – R. F. Foster, historian.
- 20 January – Michael Ahern, Fianna Fáil party Teachta Dála (TD) and Minister of State.
- 30 January – Joe Callanan, Fianna Fáil TD.
- 1 February – Joan Burton, Labour Party deputy leader, TD for Dublin West.
- 2 February – John McAreavey, Bishop of Dromore.
- 5 February – Nuala Ahern, Green Party Member of the European Parliament representing Leinster.
- 6 February – Jim Sheridan, film director.
- 12 February – Fergus Slattery, international rugby player.
- 3 March
  - Frank Chambers, Fianna Fáil senator.
  - Ben Dunne, chief executive of Dunnes Stores.
- 9 April – Sorcha Cusack, actress.
- 18 April – Peter Caffrey, actor (died 2008).
- 18 April – Avril Doyle, Fine Gael party Member of the European Parliament representing Leinster.
- 1 May – Joe Higgins, Socialist Party TD.
- 18 May – Pat Rabbitte, Leader of the Labour Party.
- 23 May – Martin Cahill, Dublin criminal (shot and killed 1994).
- 10 June – Daniele Formica, Irish-Italian actor, director and playwright (died 2011)
- 11 July – Shane Ross, journalist, member of the 22nd Seanad representing Dublin University.
- 13 July – Bryan Murray, actor.
- 18 August – John O'Leary, golfer.
- 20 August – Phil Lynott, rock music singer-songwriter (died 1986).
- 26 August – Thomas Murphy, Irish republican.
- 27 August – Ann Murray, mezzo-soprano.
- 1 September – Liam Fitzgerald, Fianna Fáil TD and senator (died 2025).
- 4 September – Michael McKevitt, Irish republican convicted of directing terrorism as leader of the Real IRA (died 2021).
- 9 September – Charlie Bird, journalist and broadcaster, Chief News Correspondent with broadcaster RTÉ (died 2024).
- 27 September – Edward O'Grady, racehorse trainer (died 2025).
- 29 September – Gabriel Rosenstock, poet.
- 30 September – Charlie McCreevy, Fianna Fáil TD and cabinet minister, European Commissioner.
- October – Enda Bonner, Fianna Fáil councillor and senator.
- 3 October – Jim McDaid, Fianna Fáil TD representing Donegal North-East and cabinet minister.
- 20 October – Eddie Macken, show jumper.
- 29 October – Seán Foley, Limerick hurler.
- 12 November – Dermot Gleeson, barrister, businessman, Attorney General.
  Full date unknown

- Sean Delaney, association football player and coach (died 2004).
- Pat Moylan, Cork hurler.
- Liam O'Brien, Kilkenny hurler (died 2021).
- Nicky Ryan, music producer.

== Deaths ==
- 18 January – James Magee, cricketer (born 1872).
- 2 March – Cecil Lowry-Corry, 6th Earl Belmore, high sheriff and councillor (born 1873).
- 29 April – Timothy J. Murphy, Labour Party TD.
- 23 May – Dan Comyn, cricketer (born 1872).
- 12 July – Douglas Hyde, member of the Seanad (Senate) in 1922 and 1938; first President of Ireland, and Irish language scholar (born 1860).
- 10 September – Brian Brady, Fianna Fáil TD.
- 6 October – Robert Wilson Lynd, writer (born 1879).
- 8 October – Edith Anna Somerville, novelist (born 1858).
- 14 November – Jimmy Dunne, association football player (born 1905).
