= 1945 in Ireland =

- Centuries: 18th; 19th; 20th; 21st
- Decades: 1920s; 1930s; 1940s; 1950s; 1960s
- See also: 1945 in Northern Ireland; Other events of 1945; List of years in Ireland

Events from the year 1945 in Ireland.

== Incumbents ==
- President:
  - Douglas Hyde (until 24 June 1945)
  - Seán T. O'Kelly (from 25 June 1945)
- Taoiseach: Éamon de Valera (FF)
- Tánaiste:
  - Seán T. O'Kelly (FF) (until 14 June 1945)
  - Seán Lemass (FF) (from 14 June 1945)
- Minister for Finance:
  - Seán T. O'Kelly (FF) (until 14 June 1945)
  - Frank Aiken (FF) (from 19 June 1945)
- Chief Justice: Timothy Sullivan
- Dáil: 12th
- Seanad: 5th

== Events ==
- 1 January – Córas Iompair Éireann was established, with most public transport came under its control.
- 12 January – The people of Ireland donated £1,000,000 to the starving people of Italy.
- 13 April – Dáil Éireann sat for 20 minutes to express sympathy and pay tribute to US President Franklin Delano Roosevelt, who died the previous day. The House was then adjourned.
- 2 May
  - In one of the most controversial episodes of his premiership, Taoiseach Éamon de Valera called to the German Ambassador to express his sympathy following the death of Adolf Hitler.
  - In the last Irish shipping loss due to World War II, motor fishing trawler Naom Garvan caught a naval mine in her trawl off Helvick Head, Dungarvan; all three crew were lost.
- 7 May – Reports of a German surrender brought students of Trinity College Dublin onto the roof of the university singing the English and French national anthems. A riot ensued following the burning of the Irish tricolour.
- 11 May – Government wartime censorship of the media was lifted.
- 16 May – Éamon de Valera replied in a radio broadcast to British prime minister Winston Churchill's criticism of Irish neutrality.
- 18 May – Éamon de Valera announced £12 million food and clothing aid programmed for Europe.
- 22 May – The Irish Legal Terms Act was signed into law, providing support for greater use of Irish in the legal system.
- 14 June – In the 1945 presidential election, Fianna Fáil party candidate Seán T. O'Kelly beat Fine Gael party candidate Seán Mac Eoin and Independent candidate Patrick McCartan. O'Kelly was inaugurated on June 20 as Ireland's second president.
- July – Rannóg an Aistriúcháin, the Oireachtas translation service, published Litriú na Gaeilge: Lámhleabhar an Chaighdeáin Oifigiúil ("Irish orthography: a handbook of the official standard").
- 24 July – Following visits to England, France, and Germany, future American president John F. Kennedy arrived in Dublin for a two-day visit as a cub reporter for the Hearst newspaper group.
- 25 July – John Kennedy interviewed the Taoiseach, Éamon de Valera, on the subject of Irish Partition. He filed a story for the New York Journal-American on 29 July entitled, "Eamon de Valera Seeks to Unite All Ireland: Eire Premier Answers Dillon on Constitutional Rights".
- 21 August – Two nationalist Members of Parliament took the Oath of Allegiance and entered the Parliament of the United Kingdom at Westminster.
- 17 October – the Johnstown Castle Agricultural College Act, 1945 was ratified. Johnstown Castle (County Wexford) and estate were formally handed over to the State by the family in lieu of death duties.
- 3 December – Oranges went on sale in Ireland for the first time since the end of World War II.
- 14 December – The Nuremberg Trials heard the story of German plans to create a revolution in Ireland during World War II.
- 25 December – In a presidential address, Seán T. O'Kelly asked the youth of Ireland to make a particular effort to restore the Irish language.

=== Full date unknown ===
- A "popular edition" of the Constitution of Ireland was published by the Government's Stationery Office, amending the Irish language text.
- The Coggalbeg hoard was found by Hubert Lannon while cutting turf on his bog at Coggalbeg, County Roscommon. From 1947, it was kept in a safe at Sheehan's Chemists in Strokestown, during which time it was only seen by members of the Sheehan family, until the 2000s when the objects were stolen, and dumped in a rubbish skip in April 2009.

== Arts and literature ==
- J. Sheridan Le Fanu's Green Tea and Other Ghost Stories was published posthumously in the United States.
- Ina Boyle's first symphony, Glencree, composed in 1924–27, received its first complete performance at a Raidió Éireann studio concert.
- E. J. Moeran's Cello Concerto incorporated fragments of Irish music.
- Establishment of Irish language publisher Sáirséal agus Dill in Dublin by Seán Sairséal Ó hÉigeartaigh and his wife Bríd Ní Mhaoileoin.

== Sport ==
=== Association football ===
League of Ireland
Winners: Cork United

FAI Cup
Winners: Shamrock Rovers 1–0 Bohemians.

=== Golf ===
- The Irish Open was not played due to The Emergency (World War II).

== Births ==
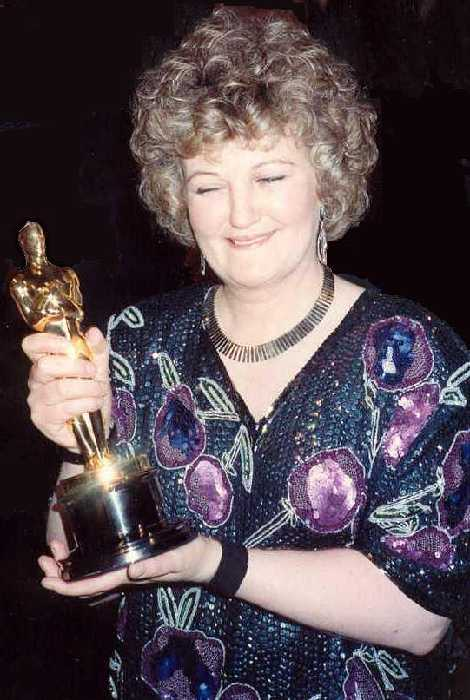
Brenda Fricker was born on 17 February

- 8 January – Kevin Conneff, bodhrán player and singer with The Chieftains.
- 12 January
  - Tony Maher, Cork hurler.
  - Eddie O'Brien, Cork hurler.
- 2 February – Billy Morgan, Cork Gaelic footballer and manager.
- 5 February – Michael Courtney, titular archbishop of Eanach Dúin and Apostolic Nuncio to Burundi (assassinated 2003).
- 12 February – Jimmy Keaveney, Dublin Gaelic footballer.
- 17 February – Brenda Fricker, actress (died 2026).
- 4 March – Tara Browne, socialite (died 1966).
- 17 March – Paddy Mulligan, association football player.
- March – Bernard Durkan, Fine Gael Teachta Dála (TD) for Kildare North.

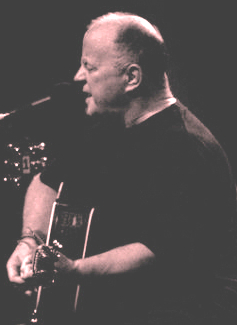
Christy Moore was born on 7 May

- 2 April – Batt O'Keeffe, Fianna Fáil TD for Cork North-West and Minister of State.
- 8 April – Diarmuid Martin, Roman Catholic Archbishop of Dublin and Primate of Ireland.
- 18 April – Margaret Hassan, aid worker in Iraq; kidnapped and murdered by Iraqi insurgents (died 2004).
- 20 April – Alan Dukes, leader of Fine Gael and TD, Director General of the Institute of European Affairs.
- 26 April – Séamus Kirk, Fianna Fáil TD for Louth.
- 27 April – Dinny McGinley, Fine Gael TD for Donegal South-West.
- 4 May – Jim Higgins, Fine Gael TD, senator and Member of the European Parliament.
- 7 May
  - Susan Denham (née Gageby), Chief Justice of Ireland.
  - Alexis FitzGerald Jnr, Fine Gael TD and senator.
  - Christy Moore, folk singer.
- 21 May – Éamonn Cregan, Limerick Gaelic footballer and hurler, manager.
- 1 June
  - Niamh Bhreathnach, Labour Party politician, TD and Minister for Education (died 2023)
  - Jarlath McDonagh, Fine Gael politician.
- 6 June – Denis Coughlan, Cork Gaelic footballer and hurler.
- 11 June – Patrick Joseph McGrath, Irish-American bishop (died 2023).
- 17 June – Pat Hickey, judoka and Olympic sports administrator.
- 20 June – Denis Brennan, Bishop of Ferns (2006–2021).
- 23 June – Paul Costelloe, fashion designer (died 2025).
- 30 June – Sean Scully, painter.
- June – Nora Owen, Fine Gael TD and Minister for Justice.
- 1 July – Jack Wall, Labour Party TD for Kildare South.
- 25 July – John Dardis, Progressive Democrats senator.
- 3 August – Eamon Dunphy, association football player, commentator and broadcaster.
- 14 August – Tony Scannell, actor.
- 12 September – Maria Aitken, actress, writer and director.
- 13 September – Niall FitzGerald, businessman.
- 15 September – Donie Cassidy, Fianna Fáil TD representing Longford–Westmeath, businessman.
- 19 September – Brendan Balfe, radio presenter.
- 20 September – Éamonn Walsh, Labour Party TD, local councillor.
- September – Gerald McCarthy, Cork hurling manager and player.
- 10 November – Mick Lally, actor.
- 19 November – Christie Hennessy, folk singer songwriter (died 2007).
- 6 December – Noel Skehan, Kilkenny hurler.
- 8 December – John Banville, novelist.
- 14 December – Bernard O'Donoghue, poet and academic.
- 17 December – John Neill, Church of Ireland Archbishop of Dublin, Bishop of Glendalough, Primate of Ireland and Metropolitan Archbishop.
- 24 December – Noel Davern, Fianna Fáil TD representing Tipperary South, cabinet minister, Member of the European Parliament.
- Full date unknown

- Richie Bennis, Limerick hurling manager.
- Justin McCarthy, Cork hurler, Waterford hurling manager.
- Philip Pettit, philosopher and political theorist.
- Kieran Purcell, Kilkenny hurler.
- Pad Joe Whelehan, Offaly hurler, manager.

== Deaths ==
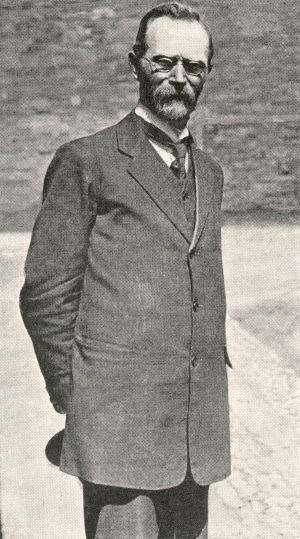
Eoin MacNeill, died 15 October

- 30 January – Patrick Belton, Fianna Fáil and Cumann na nGaedheal Teachta Dála (TD), President of the anti-communist Irish Christian Front (born 1885).
- 4 April – Henry Guinness, engineer, banker and independent senator 1922–34 (born 1858).
- 5 May – Frederick Crowley, Fianna Fáil politician (born 1890).
- 20 July – Paddy Mahon, golfer (born c. 1907).
- 24 July – Kitty Kiernan, fiancée of the assassinated Michael Collins (born 1893).
- 16 September – Count John McCormack, tenor (born 1884).
- 3 October – Dermod O'Brien, painter (born 1865).
- 13 October – Joseph MacRory, Cardinal, Archbishop of Armagh, and Primate of All Ireland (born 1861).
- 15 October – Professor Eoin MacNeill, scholar, nationalist and revolutionary, a founder-member of the Gaelic League and the Irish Volunteers (born 1867).
- 24 October – Frederick Field, Admiral of the Fleet (Royal Navy) and First Sea Lord (born 1871).
- 6 December – Edmund Dwyer-Gray, politician and 29th Premier of Tasmania in 1939 (born 1870).
- 20 December – John M. Lyle, architect in Canada (born 1872).
