= Graham Crothers =

Irish cricketer (born 1949)

Personal information
- Full name: Joseph Graham Crothers
- Born: 8 April 1949 (age 77); Belfast, Northern Ireland
- Batting: Right-handed

Domestic team information
- Years: Team
- 1972: Ireland

Career statistics
Competition	First-class
Matches	1
Runs scored	10
Batting average	5.00
100s/50s	–/–
Top score	10
Catches/stumpings	1/–
- Source: Cricinfo, 1 January 2022

Joseph Graham Crothers (born 8 April 1949 in Belfast, Northern Ireland) is a former Irish cricketer. A right-handed batsman, he played twice for the Ireland cricket team in 1972, against Scotland and Wales. The match against Scotland had first-class status.
