= Christopher Harte =

Irish former cricketer (born 1949)

Personal information
- Full name: Christopher Charles John Hart
- Born: 23 February 1949 (age 77); Belfast, Northern Ireland
- Batting: Right-handed

Career statistics
Competition	First-class	List A
Matches	2	2
Runs scored	82	15
Batting average	27.33	7.50
100s/50s	0/0	0/0
Top score	40	8
Catches/stumpings	0/0	2/0
- Source: CricInfo, 27 March 2019

Christopher Charles John Hart (born 23 February 1949) is an Irish former cricketer. A right-handed batsman and wicket-keeper, he played 20 times for the Ireland cricket team between 1972 and 1982 including two first-class matches and two List A matches.

== Playing career ==
Harte made his debut for Ireland against Wales in August 1972, scoring 45 in the Irish first innings. His next match was also against Wales, in June 1973, following this with a game against Denmark and a game against the MCC at Lord's before playing his first first-class match against Scotland. This was followed by a tour of North America with Ireland, playing matches against Canada and the USA.

He would not play again for Ireland for almost four years, playing against Wales at Swansea in July 1977. He followed this with a match against Sussex during which he scored 49, his highest score for Ireland. A match against the MCC finished the year. He played against the MCC, Surrey and Wales in 1978 before he was again absent from the Irish team.

His next match was against Middlesex in July 1981, following this with his List A debut against Gloucestershire. He then played his final first-class match against Scotland later the same month and finished the year with matches against the MCC and Surrey. The following year, 1982, was his last in the Irish team, playing against India and Northamptonshire before his final game for Ireland, against Wales in July 1982.

== Statistics ==
In all matches for Ireland, he scored 49 runs at an average of 18.27. He took 24 catches and two stumpings.
