= Desmond Dinan =

Irish academic

Desmond Dinan (born 1957) is an Irish academic (originally from Cork), is the Jean Monnet Professor at the George Mason School of Public Policy, in Arlington, Virginia, US. He is the author of a number of textbooks on European integration and its history. He lives and works in the United States. He is married and has three children.

== Bibliography ==
- Dinan, Desmond (1993). Historical Dictionary of the European Community. Metuchen : The Scarecrow Press.
- Dinan, Desmond (1994). Ever Closer Union?: An Introduction to the European Community. Basingstoke : Palgrave Macmillan.
- Dinan, Desmond (1999). Ever Closer Union?: An Introduction to European Integration. 2nd ed. Basingstoke : Palgrave : Macmillan.
- Dinan, Desmond (2000). Encyclopedia of the European Union. Boulder : Lynne Rienner.
- Dinan, Desmond (2005). Ever Closer Union: An Introduction to European Integration. 3rd ed. Boulder, Colo. : Lynne Rienner Publishers.
- Dinan, Desmond (2004). Europe Recast: A History of European Union. Basingstoke : Palgrave Macmillan.
