= Jamie Delargy =

British journalist (born 1953)

Jamie Delargy (born 6 August 1953 in Cushendall), is a Northern Irish journalist. He was Business Editor at UTV until his retirement in 2016.

== Journalism career ==
Delargy worked for Ulster Television from 1980 until 2016. He was one of two journalists at the station believed to have not been considered for a voluntary redundancy package at the station in late 2008. From December 2007, Delargy contributed a blog to UTV's website on business news and issues affecting Northern Ireland.

== Honours ==
Delargy has been voted Broadcast Business Journalist of the Year at the IPR Awards in 2003, 2005, 2006 and 2007. He received the overall Business Journalist of the Year award at the same ceremony in 2005 and 2007.

== Personal life ==
Delargy is married with three children.
