= John Egan (Dublin GAA) =

John Egan (16 March 1951 – 1 July 2007) was a former Dublin GAA county chairman. Also known as Seán Mac Aogáin, he was also active in the promotion of the Irish language. He was elected to the chair of Dublin's county board in 1998 and served as chairman until 2002 and was a member of Clan na nGael GAA club in Ringsend, County Dublin. Egan was also the principal of Haddington Road Boys' National School in County Dublin. Egan died, aged 56, after his bicycle was in collision with a parked car in Enfield, County Meath.

Preceded by ?	Dublin County Chairman; 1998-?	Succeeded by John Bailey
