= Tom Ross (cricketer) =

Irish cricketer (1872–1947)

Cricket information
- Batting: Right-handed
- Bowling: Right-arm off-break

International information
- National side: Ireland

Career statistics
Competition	First-class
Matches	10
Runs scored	320
Batting average	20.00
100s/50s	0/1
Top score	89
Balls bowled	1,868
Wickets	46
Bowling average	19.58
5 wickets in innings	5
10 wickets in match	0
Best bowling	7/82
Catches/stumpings	8/–
- Source: CricketArchive, 6 December 2022

Thomas Couland Ross (14 February 1872 – 2 January 1947) was an Irish cricketer. He was a right-handed batsman and right-arm off-break bowler.

He made his debut for Ireland in July 1894 against South Africa, and went on to play for Ireland on 20 occasions. His last match was against Scotland in July 1910. Nine of his matches for Ireland had first-class status, his other first-class game was for the Gentlemen in the first Gentlemen v Players match of 1902.
