= Robert Bruce Bowers =

Irish cricketer (1897–1956)

Personal information
- Full name: Robert Bruce Bowers
- Born: 1 March 1897; Lambeg, Ireland
- Died: 25 November 1956 (aged 59); Belfast, Northern Ireland
- Batting: Right-handed
- Bowling: Right-arm medium

Domestic team information
- Years: Team
- 1926: Ireland

Career statistics
Competition	First-class
Matches	1
Runs scored	10
Batting average	5.00
100s/50s	–/–
Top score	5
Balls bowled	150
Wickets	0
Bowling average	–
5 wickets in innings	–
10 wickets in match	–
Best bowling	–
Catches/stumpings	2/–
- Source: Cricinfo, 3 January 2022

Robert Bruce Bowers (1 March 1897 in Lambeg, County Antrim – 25 November 1956 in Belfast) was an Irish cricketer. A right-handed batsman and right-arm medium pace bowler, he played just once for Ireland, a first-class match against Wales in June 1926.
