= Governor of Northern Ireland =

Representative of the British monarchy in the country (1922–73)

- Style: Excellency
- Residence: Hillsborough Castle
- Appointer: British Monarch
- Precursor: Lord Lieutenant of Ireland
- Formation: 9 December 1922
- First holder: The 3rd Duke of Abercorn
- Final holder: The Lord Grey of Naunton
- Abolished: 18 July 1973
- Succession: Secretary of State for Northern Ireland

The Governor of Northern Ireland was the principal officer and representative in Northern Ireland of the British monarch. The office was established on 9 December 1922 and abolished on 18 July 1973.

== Overview ==
The office of Governor of Northern Ireland was established on 9 December 1922 under letters patent to:

do and execute in due manner as respects Northern Ireland all things which by virtue of the [1920] Act and our said Letters Patent of 27 April 1921 or otherwise belonged to the office of Lord Lieutenant at the time of the passing of the Irish Free State Constitution Act 1922.

The governor was the successor to the Lord Lieutenant of Ireland in Northern Ireland, itself established on 3 May 1921. (Note: 3 May 1921 was the "appointed day" under the Government of Ireland Act 1920, upon which the Parliaments of Northern Ireland and Southern Ireland were established.) The office of the governor was abolished on 18 July 1973 under Section 32 of the Northern Ireland Constitution Act 1973. The secretary of state for Northern Ireland, a cabinet office that had been created in 1972, took over the functions of the governor on 20 December 1973 under Letters Patent.

Analogous to the governor-general of a Commonwealth Dominion, the governor's formal power was ceremonial, exercised on the "advice" of the Government of Northern Ireland. The government was technically an "executive committee" of the governor's Privy Council of Northern Ireland, which was ceremonial and rarely met. The governor summoned and prorogued the Parliament of Northern Ireland (latterly at Stormont Castle) and delivered the speech from the throne at the Parliament's annual State Opening (except for the first such in 1921, delivered in person by George V). The governor had possession of the Great Seal of Northern Ireland, and exercised the prerogative of mercy.

The governor gave royal assent to bills passed by Stormont. While he had the formal power to disallow or reserve legislation, this was never exercised. The only instance of reservation in relation to Stormont was made by Viscount FitzAlan, the Lord Lieutenant of Ireland, shortly before the office was replaced by that of Governor of Northern Ireland. FitzAlan referred the Local Government Act (Northern Ireland) 1922 to the Home Office in London from concern that its abolition of single transferable vote in local elections would violate the 1920 act's prohibition of religious discrimination. The Home Office agreed with FitzAlan but Bonar Law's Conservative government advised FitzAlan to assent regardless, after James Craig threatened the resignation of his ministry in Stormont. This precedent dissuaded later London governments from interfering in Northern Ireland, although newly enacted Stormont bills were sent to the Home Secretary for review as a matter of course.

A 1951 visit by the governor to Londonderry Corporation was the focus of a nationalist protest led by Eddie McAteer against gerrymandering by the unionist corporation against Derry's nationalist majority. When Viscount Brookeborough resigned as prime minister in 1963, governor Baron Wakehurst was active in choosing Terence O'Neill as his successor. O'Neill in his memoirs compared this to Elizabeth II's appointment by royal prerogative of Alec Douglas-Home as UK prime minister the same year. Ken Bloomfield, a leading Stormont civil servant in the 1960s, "never had any sense of the Governor as a significant factor in [Northern Ireland prime ministers'] plans or calculations". While the Governor might in theory have been a channel of communication between Stormont and London, in practice the Stormont Cabinet Office talked directly to the Home Office in Whitehall. In 1966, an early sign of Northern Ireland's impending troubles came with the unpopularity among loyalists of Governor Lord Erskine, who had successfully lobbied for a new Belfast bridge to be named after Elizabeth II rather than loyalist hero Edward Carson. A crowd led by Ian Paisley jostled and heckled Erskine and his wife as they left the General Assembly of the Presbyterian Church in Ireland.

== Official residence ==
The official residence of the governor of Northern Ireland was Hillsborough Castle in County Down. Following refurbishment of the Castle, the Duke of Abercorn took up residence in 1925. It remained the official residence until the abolition of the office of governor in 1973; henceforth it has been the official residence of the secretary of state for Northern Ireland.

== Governors of Northern Ireland (1922–73) ==
The Governor's standard term of office was six years, renewable without limit, and with no dependency on general elections to the Stormont Parliament. These provisions were carried over in 1922 from those applied by the 1920 act to the office of Lord Lieutenant. The Duke of Abercorn, whose third term as Governor expired in December 1940, agreed to stay on until the end of the Second World War, at which point Earl Granville served out the balance of Abercorn's term and a full term of his own. In 1968, Lord Erskine resigned owing to his wife's ill health. His successor Lord Grey's term was cut short by the 1972 imposition of direct rule.

No.	Portrait	Name (Birth–Death)	Term of office			Monarch	Prime Minister
No.	Portrait	Name (Birth–Death)	Took office	Left office	Time in office	Monarch	Prime Minister
1		James Hamilton, 3rd Duke of Abercorn (1869–1953)	12 December 1922	6 September 1945	22 years, 268 days	George V Edward VIII; George VI	Craigavon; Andrews; Brooke
2		William Leveson-Gower, 4th Earl Granville (1880–1953)	7 September 1945	1 December 1952	7 years, 85 days	George VI; Elizabeth II	Brooke
3		John Loder, 2nd Baron Wakehurst (1895–1970)	3 December 1952	1 December 1964	11 years, 364 days	Elizabeth II	Brookeborough; O'Neill
4		John Erskine, 1st Baron Erskine of Rerrick (1893–1980)	3 December 1964	2 December 1968	3 years, 365 days	Elizabeth II	O'Neill
5		Ralph Grey, Baron Grey of Naunton (1910–1999)	3 December 1968	18 July 1973	4 years, 205 days	Elizabeth II	O'Neill; Chichester-Clark; Faulkner

== Deputies ==
The 1922 "Instructions" sent alongside the letters patent establishing the office required the governor of Northern Ireland to get the monarch's permission to leave Northern Ireland, and empowered the governor in such cases to issue letters patent under the Great Seal of Northern Ireland appointing a "Deputy or Deputies, Justice or Justices" during his absence. This emulated the practice of appointing Lords Justices of Ireland when the lord lieutenant was absent from Ireland. These were formally called "Lords Justices for the government of Northern Ireland". Each new governor upon taking office would select a slate of eligible deputies from among the Privy Council of Northern Ireland, and at each of his subsequent absences a subset of these would be sworn in for its duration. Many were Lord Chief Justice or Lord Justice of Appeal: Denis Henry, William Moore, James Andrews, Anthony Babington, John MacDermott, Baron MacDermott, Samuel Clarke Porter. Others were Senators and/or county lieutenants: Robert Sharman-Crawford, Robert David Perceval-Maxwell, Henry Armstrong, Sir Thomas Dixon, 2nd Baronet, Maurice McCausland, Francis Needham, 4th Earl of Kilmorey.

== See also ==
- Lord Lieutenant of Ireland
- Governor-General of the Irish Free State

== Sources ==
- Bloomfield, Ken (2007). A Tragedy of Errors: The Government and Misgovernment of Northern Ireland. Liverpool University Press. ISBN 978-1-84631-064-5.
- Quekett, Arthur S. (1928). The Constitution Of Northern Ireland. Vol. Part I: The Origin and Development of the Constitution. Belfast: HMSO.
- Quekett, Arthur S. (1933). The Constitution Of Northern Ireland. Vol. Part II: The Government of Ireland Act 1920 and Subsequent Enactments. Belfast: HMSO.
- Torrance, David (21 December 2020). "Parliament and Northern Ireland, 1921–2021" (PDF). House of Commons Briefing Papers (CBP-8884).
