= Austin (given name) =

Name list

- Gender: Male

Origin
- Origin: Old French

Other names
- Related names: Augustine; Augustin; Agustin; Aostin; Austen; Auston

Austin is an English masculine given name, an Old French language contraction of Agustin as Aostin, Austin (regular disappearing of intervocalic [g] from Late Latin to Old French; cf. : Old French aüst / aoust, French août). Agustin is the popular form of Augustin, equivalent to Augustine. Variations of the name include Austen and Auston.

== People ==
=== A ===
- Austin Abrams (born 1996), American actor
- Austin Adamec (born 1988), American musician
- Austin Adams (disambiguation), multiple people
- Austin Adarraga (born 1965), Spanish squash player
- Austin Ajiake (born 2000), American football player
- Austin Ainge (born 1981), American basketball coach and player
- Austin Allen (disambiguation), multiple people
- Austin M. Allran (born 1951), American politician
- Austin D. Alvord (1843–1924), American politician
- Austin Amelio (born 1988), American actor
- Austin Amissah (1930–2001), Ghanaian lawyer
- Austin Anderson (born 2003), New Zealand rugby union footballer
- Austin Andrews (born 1985), Canadian film editor
- Austin App (1902–1984), German-American professor
- Austin Appleby (born 1993), American football player
- Austin Ardill (1917–2010), Northern Irish politician
- Austin Aries (born 1978), American professional wrestler
- Austin Armacost (born 1988), American television personality
- Austin Armstrong (born 1993), American football coach
- Austin Arnett (born 1991), American mixed martial artist
- Austin Asche (1925–2024), Australian judge
- Austin Aune (born 1993), American football player
- Austin Austin (1855–1925), Australian politician

=== B ===
- Austin Baeth (born 1984), American politician and physician
- Austin Barber (born 2003), American football player
- Austin Barnes (born 1989), American baseball player
- Austin Basis (born 1976), American actor
- Austin Bauer (born 1997), Canadian badminton player
- Austin Baxter (1931–1993), English cricketer
- Austin Bearse (1808–1881), American sea captain
- Austin Beck (born 1998), American baseball player
- Austin Beers (born 2003), American stock car racing driver
- Austin Belknap (1819–1902), American businessman and politician
- Austin Letheridge Bender (1916–1980), American politician
- Austin Bergner (born 1997), American baseball player
- Austin Bernicke (died 1977), Nauran politician
- Austin Berry (disambiguation), multiple people
- Austin Beutner (born 1960), American businessman
- Austin Bibens-Dirkx (born 1985), American baseball player
- Austin Bide (1915–2008), British chemist
- Austin Bird (1884–1938), English cricketer
- Austin Bisnow (born 1987), American musician
- Austin Bissell (died 1807), English naval officer
- Austin Block (born 1989), American ice hockey player
- Austin Blythe (born 1992), American football player
- Austin Booker (born 2002), American football player
- Austin Brady (born 1955), Irish footballer
- Austin Brice (born 1992), American baseball player
- Austin Briggs (1908–1973), American cartoonist
- Austin Brinkman (born 2002), American football player
- Austin Brown (born 1985), American singer-songwriter
- Austin Brown (American football) (born 2003), American football player
- Austin Brucklacher (1898–1941), American football player
- Austin M. Brues (1906–1991), American biologist
- Austin Brummett (born 2004), American soccer player
- Austin R. Brunelli (1907–1989), American army officer
- Austin Bryant (born 1996), American football player
- Austin Buchanan (born 1984), English rugby league footballer
- Austin Bukenya (born 1944), Ugandan poet and novelist
- Austin Butler (born 1991), American actor

=== C ===
- Austin Calitro (born 1994), American football player
- Austin Cameron (born 1977), American stock car racing driver
- Austin Carlile (born 1987), American singer-songwriter
- Austin Carr (disambiguation), multiple people
- Austin Carroll (1835–1909), Irish nun
- Austin Cary (1865–1936), American forester
- Austin Cassar-Torreggiani (1915–1978), Maltese sprinter
- Austin Causey (born 2001), American soccer player
- Austin Chapman (1864–1926), Australian politician
- Austin Chewe, Zambian politician
- Austin Chick (born 1971), American film director
- Austin Choi-Fitzpatrick, American scholar
- Austin Cindric (born 1998), American stock car racing driver
- Austin Clapp (1910–1971), American swimmer
- Austin Hobart Clark (1880–1954), American zoologist
- Austin Clarke (disambiguation), multiple people
- Austin Claunch (born 1989), American basketball coach
- Austin Claypool (1887–1956), Canadian politician
- Austin Coates (1922–1997), British civil servant
- Austin Codrington (born 1975), Canadian cricketer
- Austin E. Cofrin (1883–1980), American industrialist
- Austin Cole (born 1998), Canadian athlete
- Austin Collie (born 1985), Canadian-born American football player
- Austin Collier (1914–1991), English footballer
- Austin Connelly (born 1996), American professional golfer
- Austin Cook (born 1991), American professional golfer
- Austin Cooper (disambiguation), multiple people
- Austin Corbett (born 1995), American football player
- Austin Corbin (1827–1896), American entrepreneur
- Austin M. Cowan (1885–1949), American judge
- Austin Cowles (1792–1872), American religious figure
- Austin Cox (born 1997), American baseball player
- Austin Craig (1872–1949), American historian
- Austin P. Cristy (1850–1926), American publisher
- Austin Croshere (born 1975), American basketball player
- Austin Crute (born 1995), American actor and singer
- Austin Currie (1939–2021), Irish politician
- Austin F. Cushman (1830–1914), American inventor
- Austin Cutting (born 1996), American football player
- Austin Cuvillier (1779–1849), Canadian businessman
- Austin Czarnik (born 1992), American ice hockey player

=== D ===
- Austin Dabney (1765–1830), American slave and militiaman
- Austin Dacey (born 1972), American philosopher and activist
- Austin da Luz (born 1987), American soccer player
- Austin Davis (disambiguation), multiple people
- Austin Daye (born 1988), American basketball player
- Austin Dean (born 1993), American baseball player
- Austin Deasy (1936–2017), Irish politician
- Austin Deculus (born 1999), American football player
- Austin de Lone (born 1946), American keyboardist
- Austin Denham (1850–1948), American sailor
- Austin Denney (1944–2009), American football player
- Austin DeSanto (born 1998), American wrestler
- Austin Edwin Dewar (1912–1985), Canadian politician
- Austin Dias (born 1998), New Zealand rugby league footballer
- Austin Dickinson (American football) (born 1988), American football coach
- Austin Dillon (born 1990), American stock car racing driver
- Austin Dobson (1912–1963), English racing driver
- Austin Dowling (1868–1930), American prelate
- Austin Downes (1907–??), American football player
- Austin K. Doyle (1898–1970), American naval officer
- Austin Thabani Dube (born 1992), South African footballer
- Austin Dufault (born 1990), American basketball player
- Austin Duke (born 1993), American football player
- Austin Dummett (1923–1984), Guyanese cricketer
- Austin Duncan-Jones (1908–1967), British philosopher
- Austin Dunne (1934–2007), Irish footballer
- Austin J. Durney (1867–1926), American sailor
- Austin Dyne (born 1992), American auto racing driver

=== E ===
- Austin Eaton III (born 1969), American golfer
- Austin Eckroat (born 1999), American golfer
- Austin Edwards (born 1997), American football player
- Austin Burton Edwards (1909–1960), Australian geologist
- Austin Ejide (born 1984), Nigerian footballer
- Austin Ekeler (born 1995), American football player
- Austin Emens (born 2002), English rugby union footballer
- Auston English (born 1987), American football player
- Austin Ernst (born 1992), American golfer
- Austin W. Erwin (1887–1965), American lawyer and politician
- Austin Eubanks (1981–2019), American motivational speaker
- Austin Evans (born 1968), Australian politician
- Austin Evans (YouTuber) (born 1992), American social media personality

=== F ===
- Austin Faoliu (born 1999), American football player
- Austin Farley (born 1993), American ice hockey player
- Austin Farrer (1904–1968), English theologian and philosopher
- Austin Fernando, Sri Lankan politician and civil servant
- Austin L. Fickling (1914–1997), American judge
- Austin Flannery (1925–2008), Dominican priest and editor
- Austin Lloyd Fleming (1894–1969), Canadian pilot
- Austin Flint I (1812–1886), American physician
- Austin Flint II (1836–1915), American physician
- Austin Florian (born 1994), American skeleton racer
- Austin Flynn (1933–2021), Irish hurler
- Austin E. Ford (1857–1896), American publisher
- Austin Forkner (born 1998), American motocross racer
- Austin Fort (born 1995), American football player
- Austin Frakt, American economist
- Austin Franklin (born 1992), American football player
- Austin Levi Fraser (1868–1946), Canadian lawyer and judge
- Austin Freeman (born 1989), American basketball player
- Austin French (born 1994), American Christian musician
- Austin Fyten (born 1991), Canadian ice hockey player

=== G ===
- Austin Gallagher, American marine biologist
- Austin Akufo Gamey (born 1949), Ghanaian politician
- Austin Highsmith Garces (born 1981), American actress
- Austin B. Garretson (1856–1931), American labor leader
- Austin Garvin (1945–2022), Irish Gaelic football manager
- Austin Gary (born 1947), American novelist
- Austin Gatt (born 1953), Maltese politician
- Austin Gibbs (born 1986), American musician
- Austin Claude Girdwood (1875–1951), British army officer
- Austin Gleeson (born 1995), Irish hurler
- Austin Gomber (born 1993), American baseball player
- Austin Gomez (born 1998), Mexican-American wrestler
- Austin Gough, American football player
- Austin Gralton (1871–1919), Australian rugby union footballer
- Austin Gear (2016) footballer 9 years old
- Austin Grossman (born 1969), American author
- Austin Guerrero (born 1989), American soccer player
- Austin Gunn (born 1994), American professional wrestler
- Austin Gunsel (1909–1974), American sports executive

=== H ===
- Austin Hack (born 1992), American rower
- Austin Hall (writer) (1885–1933), American novelist
- Austin Hamilton (born 1997), Swedish sprinter
- Austin Hamlet (born 1979), Nigerian footballer
- Austin Hansen (1910–1996), American photographer
- Austin Morris Harmon (1878–1950), American scholar
- Austin Harrier (1912–2000), American politician
- Austin Harris (born 1995/1996), American politician
- Austin Harrison (1873–1928), British journalist
- Austin Hays (born 1995), American baseball player
- Austin Healey (born 1973), English rugby union player
- Austin Hedges (born 1992), American baseball player
- Austin Hendrick (born 2001), American baseball player
- Austin Herink (born 1995), American football coach
- Austin Herzog (born 2002), American racing driver
- Austin Higgins (1897–1976), American football player
- Austin Hill (born 1994), American stock car racing driver
- Austin Bradford Hill (1897–1991), English epidemiologist
- Austin Hodson (1879–1961), English bishop
- Austin Hogan (1901–1982), Australian rules footballer
- Austin Hollins (born 1991), American basketball player
- Austin Holyoake (1826–1874), British publisher
- Austin Hooper (born 1994), American football player
- Austin Hope (born 1973), American winemaker
- Austin Hopkinson (1879–1962), British politician and industrialist
- Austin Horan (1869–1925), Australian politician
- Austin Howard (born 1987), American football player
- Austin Howell (1987–2019), American rock climber
- Austin Hoyt (1915–1976), American judge
- Austin Hubbard (born 1991), American mixed martial artist
- Austin Hudson (disambiguation), multiple people
- Austin Huggins (born 1970), Kittitian footballer

=== I ===
- Austin Idol (born 1949), American professional wrestler
- Austin Ikenna (born 1993), Nigerian footballer
- Austin Ikin (1930–2013), South African rower

=== J ===
- Austin Jackson (disambiguation), multiple people
- Austin Johnson (disambiguation), multiple people
- Austin Jones (disambiguation), multiple people

=== K ===
- Austin Kafentzis (born 1996), American football player
- Austin Kalish (1921–2016), American film producer
- Austin Kanallakan (born 1991), American figure skater
- Austin Katz (born 1999), American swimmer
- Austin Kearns (born 1980), American baseball player
- Austin Kellogg (1814–1895), American politician
- Austin Kelly (born 1989), American basketball coach
- Austin Kendall (born 1997), American football player
- Austin Kerr (born 1989), American musical artist
- Austin Keys (born 2002), American football player
- Austin King (born 1981), American football coach
- Austin Augustus King (1802–1870), American lawyer and politician
- Austin H. Kiplinger (1918–2015), American journalist and businessman
- Austin Kitchen (born 1997), American baseball player
- Austin Kleba (born 1999), American speed skater
- Austin Kleon (born 1983), American author
- Austin Knickerbocker (1918–1997), American basketball player
- Austin Knight (disambiguation), multiple people
- Austin Eldon Knowlton (1909–2003), American architect
- Austin Knudsen (born 1980/1981), American politician
- Austin Kowal (born 1985), American entrepreneur
- Austin Krajicek (born 1990), American tennis player

=== L ===
- Austin Lane, American academic administrator
- Austin Larkin (born 1995), American football player
- Austin E. Lathrop (1865–1950), American politician
- Austin Ledbetter (born 1995), American soccer player
- Austin Lee (born 1983), American artist
- Austin M. Lee (1919–2013), American politician
- Austin Leigh, British actor
- Austin Leslie (1934–2005), American chef
- Austin Lewis (disambiguation), multiple people
- Austin Liato (1965–2026), Zambian politician
- Austin Lin (born 1988), Taiwanese actor
- Austin Loughnan (1851–1926), Australian cricketer
- Austin Lucas, American indie artist
- Austin Luke (born 1994), American basketball player
- Austin da Luz (born 1987), American soccer player

=== M ===
- Austin MacCormick (1893–1979), American criminologist
- Austin MacDonald (born 1995), Canadian actor
- Austin MacGinnis (born 1995), American football player
- Austin Mack (born 1997), American football player
- Austin Mack (quarterback) (born 2006), American football player
- Austin MacPhee (born 1979), Scottish footballer
- Austin Madison (born 1984), American animator and actor
- Austin Maddox (born 1991), American baseball player
- Austin Mahone (born 1996), American singer-songwriter
- Austin Makacha (born 1984), Kenyan footballer
- Austin Mann (1847–1912), American lawyer and politician
- Austin Mardon (born 1962), Canadian author
- Austin John Marshall (1937–2013), English record producer
- Austin Martin (born 1999), American baseball player
- Austin Martz (born 1992), American soccer player
- Austin Mast (born 1972), American researcher
- Austin Matthews (1904–1997), English cricketer
- Auston Matthews (born 1997), American ice hockey player
- Austin McCann (born 1980), Scottish footballer
- Austin McChord (born 1985), American businessman and engineer
- Austin McDaniel (born 1994), American stock car racing driver
- Austin McGary (1846–1928), American evangelist
- Austin McGill (born 1935), Scottish footballer
- Austin McHenry (1894–1922), American baseball player
- Austin McIntosh (born 1987), English footballer
- Austin P. McKenzie (born 1993), American actor
- Austin McNamara (born 2001), American football player
- Austin Meade (born 1994), American musician
- Austin Meadows (born 1995), American baseball player
- Austin Mecklem (1890–1951), American artist
- Austin Meehan (1897–1961), American politician
- Austin Meldon (1844–1904), Irish surgeon and writer
- Austin Menaul (1888–1975), American track athlete
- Austin Metcalf (died 2025), American murder victim
- Austin Miller (disambiguation), multiple people
- Austin Mitchell (1934–2021), British politician
- Austin Morris (1913–1991), English footballer
- Austin Moyo (1957–2018), Zimbabwean soldier
- Austin Murphy (1927–2024), American politician
- Austin Murphy (writer) (born 1961), American sports writer
- Austin Muwowo (born 1996), Zambian footballer
- Austin Mashazi (born 1983, Transformation leader, leadership coach, and mechanical engineer

=== N ===
- Austin Nichols (born 1980), American actor
- Austin Nichols (basketball) (born 1994), American basketball player
- Austin Nola (born 1989), American baseball player
- Austin Noonan (1933–2022), Irish footballer
- Austin North (born 1996), American actor
- Austin Novosad (born 2004), American football player

=== O ===
- Austin O'Brien (born 1981), American actor and photographer
- Austin O'Connor (equestrian) (born 1974), Irish equestrian
- Austin O'Connor (wrestler) (born 1998), American wrestler
- Austin Odhiambo (born 1998), Kenyan footballer
- Austin O'Malley (Gaelic footballer), Gaelic footballer
- Austin O'Malley (author) (1858–1932), English ophthalmologist
- Austin Osueke, American comic book artist

=== P ===
- Austin Pack (born 1994), American soccer player
- Austin Pardue (1899–1981), American bishop
- Austin Parsons (born 1949), Scottish cricketer
- Austin Pasztor (born 1990), Canadian-American football player
- Austin H. Patterson, American politician
- Austin Pearce (1921–2004), British aerospace engineer
- Austin Peay (1876–1927), American politician
- Austin Peck (born 1971), American actor
- Austin Pelton (1920–2003), Canadian politician
- Austin Pendleton (born 1940), American actor
- Austin Peralta (1990–2012), American pianist
- Austin Petersen (born 1981), American writer
- Austin Peterson (cartoonist) (1906–2015), American screenwriter
- Austin Pettis (born 1989), American football player
- Austin F. Pike (1819–1886), American politician
- Austin Pitre (1918–1981), American musician
- Austin Poganski (born 1996), American ice hockey player
- Austin Lane Poole (1889–1963), British mediaevalist
- Austin Post (disambiguation), multiple people
- Austin Price (born 1995), American basketball player
- Austin Proehl (born 1995), American football player
- Austin Prokop (1921–1980), American fencer
- Austin Pruitt (born 1989), American baseball player
- Austin Punch (1894–1985), Australian cricketer

=== Q ===
- Austin E. Quigley (born 1942), American academic administrator
- Austin Quinn (1892–1974), Irish prelate
- Austin Quinn-Davidson (born 1979), American politician and attorney

=== R ===
- Austin Ramirez (born 1978), American businessman
- Austin Rawlinson (1902–2000), English swimmer
- Austin Reaves (born 1998), American basketball player
- Austin Reed (disambiguation), multiple people
- Austin Rehkow (born 1995), American football player
- Austin Reiter (born 1991), American football player
- Austin Renforth, American general
- Austin Rhodes (1937–2019), English rugby league footballer
- Austin Ricci (born 1996), Canadian soccer player
- Austin Richards (born 1983), West Indies cricketer
- Austin Riley (born 1997), American baseball player
- Austin Rios, American bishop
- Austin Rivers (born 1992) American basketball player
- Austin Robbins (born 1971), American football player
- Austin Roberts (disambiguation), multiple people
- Austin Robertson (disambiguation), multiple people
- Austin Robinson (1897–1993), English economist
- Austin Roe (1748–1830), American spy
- Austin Rogers (disambiguation), multiple people
- Austin Romaine (born 2004), American football player
- Austin Romine (born 1988), American baseball player
- Auston Rotheram (1876–1946), Irish polo player
- Austin Rudd (1868–1929), British comedian
- Austin Ruse, American conservative political activist
- Austin Russell (disambiguation), multiple people

=== S ===
- Austin Samuels (born 2000), English footballer
- Austin Samupwa, Namibian politician
- Austin Sarat (born 1947), American political scientist and professor
- Austin Savage (born 1991), American soccer player
- Austin Scaggs, American music critic
- Austin Scarlett (born 1983), American fashion designer
- Austin Schlottmann (born 1995), American football player
- Austin Scott (disambiguation), multiple people
- Austin Seferian-Jenkins (born 1992), American football player
- Austin Seibert (born 1997), American football player
- Austin Wayne Self (born 1996), American professional stock car driver
- Austin O. Sexton (1852–1908), American politician
- Austin Shaba, Tanzanian politician
- Austin Conrad Shafer (1844–1944), American teacher
- Austin Shaw, American singer-songwriter
- Austin Shawn, American singer-songwriter
- Austin Shenton (born 1998), American baseball player
- Austin Shepherd (born 1992), American football player
- Austin Sheppard (born 1950), English rugby union footballer
- Austin Sherry, Australian rugby league footballer
- Austin Shofner (1916–1999), American Marine Corps officer
- Austin Siereveld (born 2004), American football player
- Austin Sigg (born 1995), American murderer
- Austin Simmons (born 2005), American football player
- Austin Slater (born 1992), American baseball player
- Austin J. Small (1894–1929), English writer
- Austin Smeenk (born 1987), Canadian wheelchair racer
- Austin Smith (disambiguation), multiple people
- Austin Osman Spare (1886–1956), English artist and magician
- Austin Speight (born 1962), Northern Irish footballer
- Austin Sperry (born 1978), American sailor
- Austin Spitler (born 1986), American football player
- Austin Staats (born 1998), Canadian Indigenous lacrosse player
- Austin Stack (1879–1929), Irish revolutionary and politician
- Austin Leander Staley (1902–1978), American judge
- Austin Stark (born 1979), American film producer
- Austin Steed (born 1988), American basketball player
- Austin Stevens (born 1950), South African photographer
- Austin Steward (1793–1869), American abolitionist and author
- Austin Stogner (born 2000), American football player
- Austin St. John (born 1974), American actor
- Austin Stoker (1930–2022), Trinidadian-American actor
- Austin Stowell (born 1984), American actor
- Austin Stubbs, American politician
- Austin Strand (born 1997), Canadian ice hockey player
- Austin Surhoff (born 1990), American swimmer
- Austin Swift (born 1992), American actor

=== T ===
- Austin Tam-George, South African academic
- Austin Tate (born 1951), English academic administrator
- Austin Taylor (disambiguation), multiple people
- Austin Theriault (born 1994), American stock car racing driver
- Austin Theory (born 1997), American professional wrestler and bodybuilder
- Austin Thomas (1939–2018), Aruban fencer
- Austin Tice (born 1981), American journalist and veteran
- Austin Tindle (born 1984), American anime voice actor
- Austin J. Tobin (1903–1978), American businessman
- Austin Trammell (born 1998), American football player
- Austin Traylor (born 1993), American football player
- Austin Trevor (1897–1978), Northern Irish actor
- Austin Trippier (1909–1993), English footballer
- Austin Trout (born 1985), American professional boxer
- Auston Trusty (born 1998), American soccer player

=== V ===
- Austin Vanderford (born 1990), American mixed martial artist
- Austin Vaughn (born 2008), American stock car racing driver
- Austin Verner (born 1943), English swimmer
- Austin Vetter (born 1967), American prelate
- Austin Vince (born 1965), American motorcycle rider
- Austin Volk (1918–2010), American businessman and politician
- Austin Voth (born 1992), American baseball player

=== W ===
- Austin Wagner (born 1997), Canadian ice hockey player
- Austin L. Wahrhaftig (1917–1997), American chemist
- Austin Wai (1957–2012), Hong Kong actor and choreographer
- Austin Walker (1883–1945), American politician
- Austin Walsh (disambiguation), multiple people
- Austin Walter (born 1996), American football player
- Austin Walton, American sports agent
- Austin Warren (disambiguation), multiple people
- Austin Washington (born 1985), American soccer player
- Austin Watkins (born 1998), American football player
- Austin Watson (born 1992), American ice hockey player
- Austin Webb, American country music singer
- Austin Wells (born 1999), American baseball player
- Austin Wentworth (born 1990), American football player
- Austin White (born 1959), West Indian cricketer
- Austin Wiley (born 1999), American basketball player
- Austin Williams (disambiguation), multiple people
- Austin Willis (1917–2004), Canadian actor and television host
- Austin Willis (American football) (born 1992), American football player
- Austin Wilson (born 1992), American baseball player
- Austin Eli Wing (1792–1849), American politician
- Austin John Winkler (born 1981), American singer-songwriter
- Austin Winkley (born 1934), British architect
- Austin Wintory (born 1984), American composer
- Austin B. Witherbee, American politician
- Austin Wolf (born 1981), American pornographic actor
- Austin Wonaeamirri (born 1988), Australian rules footballer
- Austin Gage Wood (born 2003), American college baseball pitcher
- Austin Woodbury (1899–1979), Australian philosopher
- Austin Woolfolk (1796–1847), American slave trader
- Austin Woolrych (1918–2004), English historian
- Austin Wormell (born 1998), American soccer player
- Austin Wright (disambiguation), multiple people
- Austin Wylie (1893–1947), American jazz musician
- Austin Wynns (born 1990), American baseball player

=== Y ===
- Austin Yang Ching-Wei (born 1998), Taiwanese chess player
- Austin Yearwood (born 1994), American soccer player
- Austin Young (born 1966), American photographer and filmmaker

=== Z ===
- Austin Zajur (born 1995), American actor

== Fictional characters ==
- Austin Ames, a main character in A Cinderella Story
- Austin Lake, a character in Rick Riordan's Percy Jackson & the Olympians and The Trials of Apollo
- Austin Moon, in the television show Austin & Ally
- Austin Miller, a character in Ginny & Georgia
- Austin Powers (character), created and portrayed by Mike Myers in films
- Austin Reed (Days of Our Lives), character in the soap opera Days of Our Lives
- Austin, a kangaroo main character in The Backyardigans, an animated kids's television series
