= Meldon =

Meldon may refer to:

== Places ==
- Meldon, Devon, England, a hamlet
  - Meldon Reservoir
- Meldon, Northumberland, England, a village
  - Meldon railway station

== People ==
- Charles Henry Meldon (1841–1892), Irish barrister and nationalist politician
- George Meldon (cricketer, born 1885) (1885–1951), Irish cricketer
- George Meldon (cricketer, born 1875) (1875–1950), Irish cricketer
- Jack Meldon (1869–1954), Irish cricketer
- Louis Meldon (1886–1956), Irish cricketer and tennis player
- Philip Meldon (1874–1942), Irish cricketer and footballer
- William Meldon (1879–1957), Irish cricketer
- Mel Levine (born 1943), American attorney and politician
- Meldon Carmichael, American politician
