= Jack Meldon =

Irish cricketer

Personal information
- Full name: John Michael Meldon
- Born: 29 September 1869; Dublin, Ireland
- Died: 12 December 1954 (aged 85); Tunbridge Wells, Kent, England
- Batting: Right-handed
- Bowling: Right-arm unknown style
- Relatives: George Meldon (cousin); Louis Meldon (cousin); Budge Meldon (cousin); George Meldon (cousin); Philip Meldon (cousin)

Domestic team information
- Years: Team
- 1902–1910: Ireland

Career statistics
Competition	First-class
Matches	5
Runs scored	55
Batting average	6.11
100s/50s	–/–
Top score	14
Catches/stumpings	1/–
- Source: Cricinfo, 2 January 2022

John Michael Meldon (29 September 1869 in Dublin, Ireland – 12 December 1954 in Tunbridge Wells, United Kingdom) was an Irish cricketer. He was a right-handed batsman and a right-arm bowler.

He played cricket at the Jesuits St Stanislaus College, Tullabeg and Clongowes Wood, before going on to study at Trinity College, Dublin, where he captained the Cricket team.

He played 31 times for Ireland, making his debut against Canada in Toronto in 1888. His last game came against Scotland in July 1910. Five of his matches had first-class status. His brother, father, uncle and four cousins all also played for Ireland.
