= 1955 in Ireland =

- Centuries: 18th; 19th; 20th; 21st
- Decades: 1930s; 1940s; 1950s; 1960s; 1970s
- See also: 1955 in Northern Ireland; Other events of 1955; List of years in Ireland

Events from the year 1955 in Ireland.

== Incumbents ==
- President: Seán T. O'Kelly
- Taoiseach: John A. Costello (FG)
- Tánaiste: William Norton (Lab)
- Minister for Finance: Gerard Sweetman (FG)
- Chief Justice: Conor Maguire
- Dáil: 15th
- Seanad: 8th

== Events ==
- 6 January – The National Farmers' Association was formed during a meeting of 1,200 people in Dublin.
- 17 March (Saint Patrick's Day) – The Church of Ireland hallowed Trim Cathedral.
- 4 July – Denis Larkin was elected Lord Mayor of Dublin, defeating 73-year-old Alfie Byrne.
- 21 July – The BBC brought its Divis television transmitter into service, marking the launch of a television service for Northern Ireland; the 35-kilowatt transmissions could also be readily received in much of Ireland.
- September – United States Senator John F. Kennedy and his wife Jacqueline visited Dublin for two days.
- 29 November – Publication of the Greyhound Industry Bill paved the way for the establishment of the greyhound board, Bord na gCon.
- 14 December – Ireland was admitted to the United Nations. Frederick Boland was appointed as its first ambassador.

== Arts and literature ==
- March – English language publication of Beckett's novel Molloy (in Paris and New York).
- 14 Apri1 – Soap opera The Kennedys of Castleross debuted on Radio Éireann.
- 3 August – English language première of Samuel Beckett's play Waiting for Godot, directed by Peter Hall, at the Arts Theatre in London.
- 28 October – Irish première of Waiting for Godot at the Pike Theatre in Dublin.
- 12 December – The Cork Opera House at Emmet Palace was destroyed by fire.
- Sigerson Clifford published his poetry collection, Ballads of a Bogman.
- Michael Sheehy's modern history Divided We Stand: A Study In Partition was published.

== Sports ==
=== Association football ===
League of Ireland
Winners: St Patrick's Athletic

FAI Cup
Winners: Shamrock Rovers 1–0 Drumcondra.

=== Rugby union ===
- 14 January – Tony O'Reilly named in the Irish rugby squad for his first cap in an international match against France.

== Births ==
- 15 January – Paddy Burke, Fine Gael Senator.
- 18 January – Fergus Martin, artist.
- 29 January – Liam Reilly, rock singer-songwriter (died 2021).
- 2 February – Dermot Ahern, Fianna Fáil TD for Louth and Cabinet Minister.
- 15 March – John McGuinness, Fianna Fáil TD for Carlow–Kilkenny.
- 27 March – Patrick McCabe, novelist.
- 29 March – Brendan Gleeson, actor.
- 1 April
  - Bobby Aylward, Fianna Fáil TD for Carlow–Kilkenny.
  - Joe O'Reilly, Fine Gael Senator.
- 7 April – Kevin Fennelly, Kilkenny hurler.
- 14 April – Simon Crowe, drummer with The Boomtown Rats.
- 17 April – Austin Brady, footballer.
- 24 April – Eamon Gilmore, Labour Party TD for Dún Laoghaire, leader of the Labour Party.
- 28 April – Mae Sexton, Progressive Democrats TD.
- 16 May – Páidí Ó Sé, Kerry Gaelic footballer and manager.
- 23 May
  - Mary Black, folk singer.
  - Luka Bloom, singer-songwriter and guitarist.
- 30 May – Colm Tóibín, novelist and critic.
- 7 June - Peter Wyse Jackson, Director of the National Botanic Gardens, Glasnevin, Dublin.
- 20 June – Aonghus McAnally, broadcast producer and presenter, actor, guitar player, billiards champion and magician.
- 25 June - Paula Meehan, poet, playwright and teacher.
- 5 July – Sebastian Barry, playwright, novelist and poet.
- 6 July – William Wall, novelist, poet and short story writer.
- 20 July – Jem Finer, musician and composer.
- 16 August – James Reilly, Fine Gael TD for Dublin North and Minister for Health.
- 15 September – Brendan O'Carroll, comedian.
- 24 November – Jerry Holland, Munster rugby union player and coach (died 2022).
- 1 December – Pat Spillane, Kerry Gaelic footballer.
- 2 December – Joachim Kelly, Offaly hurler.
- 11 December – John Fenton, Cork hurler.
- 29 December – Pat Loughrey, Controller of BBC Northern Ireland, Director of BBC Nations and Regions and academic.
  Full date unknown

- John Allen, Cork hurler and manager.
- John Callinan, Clare hurler.
- Michael Gleeson, Tipperary hurler.
- Maighread Ní Dhomhnaill, traditional singer.
- Sean Power, Member of the States of Jersey.

== Deaths ==
- 22 January
  - Rosie Garcias de Cadiz ('Jane Murphy'), suffragette and VAD nurse (born 1878 in British India).
  - Moira O'Neill, poet (born 1864).
- February – John Dulanty, diplomat (born 1883).
- 12 February – Thomas J. Moore, actor (born 1883).
- 13 March – Evie Hone, painter and stained-glass artist (born 1894).
- 26 March – Thomas Farren, elected to Seanad Éireann in 1922 and 1931, member of the Labour Party (born 1879).
- 4 May – Michael Colivet, manager Shannon Foundry, member of First Dáil (Anti-Treaty), representing Limerick (born 1882).
- 14 May – Robert Quigg, soldier, recipient of the Victoria Cross for gallantry in 1916 at the Battle of the Somme (born 1885).
- 16 June – Stanislaus Joyce, scholar and writer, brother of James Joyce (born 1884).
- 11 July – Frank Duffy, labour leader in the United States (born 1861).
- 15 July – James Dolan, merchant, member of First Dáil (Pro-Treaty), representing Leitrim (born 1882).
- 16 July – May Guinness, painter (born 1863).
- 18 July – Billy McCandless, footballer and football manager (born 1893).
- 14 September – Kathleen Lynn, physician and politician (born 1874).
- 26 October – Michael Staines, Sinn Féin TD, member of First Dáil, first Commissioner of the Garda Síochána (born 1885).
