= Loughnan =

Loughnan is a surname. Notable people with this surname include:

- Austin Loughnan (1851–1926), Australian sportsman
- Col Loughnan (born 1942), Australian jazz saxophonist
- George Loughnan (1842–1896), Australian politician
- Jack Loughnan (1889–1949), Australian rules football player
- Robert Loughnan (1841–1934), New Zealand farmer, journalist and politician
