= Walter Bird (cricketer) =

English cricketer

Personal information
- Full name: Walter Bird
- Born: 22 July 1845; Hornsey, Middlesex, England
- Died: 27 July 1921 (aged 76); Upperton, Sussex, England
- Batting: Unknown
- Relatives: George Bird (brother); Morice Bird (nephew); Austin Bird (nephew)

Domestic team information
- Years: Team
- 1880: Marylebone Cricket Club

Career statistics
Competition	First-class
Matches	1
Runs scored	13
Batting average	6.50
100s/50s	–/–
Top score	13
Balls bowled	–
Wickets	–
Bowling average	–
5 wickets in innings	–
10 wickets in match	–
Best bowling	–
Catches/stumpings	2/–
- Source: Cricinfo, 3 September 2014

Walter Bird (22 July 1845 – 27 July 1921) was an English cricketer who played first-class cricket in 1880. He was born at Crouch Hall, Hornsey, Middlesex.

Bird made one first-class appearance for the Marylebone Cricket Club (MCC) against Hampshire in 1880 at Day's Ground, Southampton. In the match, which Hampshire won by an innings and 38 runs, Bird was dismissed for 13 runs by Frederick Blundell in the MCC first-innings, while in their second-innings he was dismissed by Frederick Jellicoe for a duck.

He died at Upperton, Sussex on 27 July 1921. His brother George, and nephews' Austin and Morice were all first-class cricketers, with Morice playing Test cricket for England.
