= George Meldon =

George Meldon may refer to:

- George Meldon (cricketer, born 1885) (1885–1951), Irish cricketer
- George Meldon (cricketer, born 1875) (1875–1950), his cousin, Irish cricketer
