= Austin Bird =

English cricketer and British Indian Army officer (1884–1938)

Personal information
- Full name: Austin Carlos Bird
- Born: 26 January 1884; Croxteth, Lancashire, England
- Died: 4 January 1938 (aged 53); Buxted, Sussex, England
- Batting: Unknown
- Relatives: George Bird (father); Morice Bird (brother); Alan Bird (son); Walter Bird (uncle); Charles Clarke (uncle)

Domestic team information
- Years: Team
- 1914: Marylebone Cricket Club

Career statistics
Competition	First-class
Matches	1
Runs scored	3
Batting average	1.50
100s/50s	–/–
Top score	3
Catches/stumpings	–/–
- Source: Cricinfo, 4 October 2021

Austin Carlos Bird (26 January 1884 — 4 January 1938) was an English first-class cricketer and British Indian Army officer.

The son of the cricketer George Bird, he was born at Croxteth Lodge in Croxteth in January 1884. He was educated at Malvern College, where he played for the cricket and football teams. After leaving Malvern in 1902, Bird attended the Royal Military College at Sandhurst, from which he graduated into the British Indian Army as a second lieutenant in August 1904. Once in British India, Bird was attached to the 39th Prince of Wales's Own Central India Horse, in which he was promoted to lieutenant in November 1906. He gained the rank of captain in August 1913, at which point he was serving in the 73rd Carnatic Infantry.

Bird returned to England in 1914, where he played a single first-class cricket match for the Marylebone Cricket Club (MCC) against Hampshire at Lord's. Batting twice in the match, he was dismissed in the MCC first innings for 3 runs by Alec Kennedy, while in their second innings he was dismissed without scoring by Jack Newman. He continued to serve in the Indian Army following the First World War, where he played minor cricket matches for North-West Frontier Province in March 1919 and later Quetta in 1925 and 1926. By 1930, he held the rank of lieutenant colonel. Bird later retired to England, where he died suddenly on 4 January 1938 at his residence in Buxted, Sussex. His brother was the Test cricketer Morice Bird. His own son, Alan, was also a first-class cricketer, as were his uncles Walter Bird and Charles Clarke.
