= International cricket in 1910 =

International cricket season

The 1910 International cricket season was from April 1910 to August 1910.

== Season overview ==
International tours
Start date	Home team	Away team	Results [Matches]			
Start date	Home team	Away team	Test	ODI	FC	LA
21 July 1910	Ireland	Scotland	—	—	1–0 [1]	—
7 August 1910	Belgium	Netherlands	—	—	0–1 [1]	—
International tournaments
Start date	Tournament				Winners	
20 June 1910	(Belgium) 1910 Brussels Exhibition Tournament				Marylebone	

== June ==
=== 1910 Brussels Exhibition Tournament ===
First-class Matches
No.	Date	Team 1	Captain 1	Team 2	Captain 2	Venue	Result
FC 1	20–21 June	Belgium	Not mentioned	(England) Marylebone	Not mentioned	Brussels	(England) Marylebone by an innings and 209 runs
FC 2	23–24 June	(England) Marylebone	Not mentioned	Netherlands	Not mentioned	Brussels	(England) Marylebone by 2 wickets
One-day Matches
No.	Date	Team 1	Captain 1	Team 2	Captain 2	Venue	Result
LA 1	25 June	Belgium	Not mentioned	Netherlands	Not mentioned	Brussels	Netherlands by 116 runs
LA 2	26 June	Netherlands	Not mentioned	France	Not mentioned	Brussels	France by 63 runs

== July ==
=== Scotland in Ireland ===
Three-day Match
No.	Date	Home captain	Away captain	Venue	Result
Match	21–23 July	George Meldon	Leslie Balfour-Melville	College Park, Dublin	Ireland by 208 runs

== August ==
=== Belgium in Netherlands ===
First-class Match
No.	Date	Home captain	Away captain	Venue	Result
Match	7 August	Not mentioned	Not mentioned	Haarlem	Netherlands on first innings by 33 runs
