= Jim Riley (cricketer) =

New Zealand cricketer (born 1948)

Personal information
- Full name: James Denis Riley
- Born: 26 January 1948 (age 78); Christchurch, New Zealand
- Batting: Left-handed

Domestic team information
- Years: Team
- 1968/69: Canterbury
- 1970/71–1971/72: Wellington
- 1972/73–1976/77: Auckland

Career statistics
Competition	First-class	List A
Matches	40	11
Runs scored	1,993	221
Batting average	32.14	20.09
100s/50s	3/8	0/0
Top score	130	38
Balls bowled	16	0
Wickets	0	–
Bowling average	–	–
5 wickets in innings	–	–
10 wickets in match	–	–
Best bowling	–	–
Catches/stumpings	34/–	4/–
- Source: Cricinfo, 24 June 2023

James Denis Riley (born 26 January 1948) is a former New Zealand cricketer who made 40 first-class appearances for Auckland, Wellington and Canterbury between 1968 and 1977.

A left-handed batsman who usually opened the innings, Riley scored 1,993 runs at an average of 32.14, with a highest score of 130 when he opened the batting for Auckland against Northern Districts in January 1974. He captained the New Zealand Under-23 cricket team in their annual first-class match in February 1971. In 1976–77 he and Austin Parsons put on 169 for the opening stand, which remained a record for Auckland against Otago until 2001–02; Riley made 121 not out.
