= International cricket in 1912 =

International cricket season

The 1912 International cricket season was from April 1912 to August 1912.

== Season overview ==
International tours
| Start date | Home team | Away team | Results [Matches] | | | |
| Start date | Home team | Away team | Test | ODI | FC | LA |
|---|---|---|---|---|---|---|
| 6 May 1912 | England | England Rest | — | — | 1–0 [1] | — |
| 24 June 1912 | Scotland | South Africa | — | — | 0–2 [2] | — |
| 8 July 1912 | Scotland | Australia | — | — | 0–1 [2] | — |
| 25 July 1912 | Ireland | South Africa | — | — | 0–1 [2] | — |
| 26 August 1912 | England | Australia | — | — | 0–0 [1] | — |
| 30 August 1912 | Ireland | Scotland | — | — | 0–1 [1] | — |
International tournaments
| Start date | Tournament | | | | Winners | |
| 27 May 1912 | (England) 1912 Triangular Tournament | | | | England | |

== May ==
=== Test trial in England ===
Three-day match
| No. | Date | Home captain | Away captain | Venue | Result |
|---|---|---|---|---|---|
| Match | 6–8 May | Not mentioned | Not mentioned | Kennington Oval, London | England by an innings and 13 runs |

=== 1912 Triangular Tournament ===
Test Matches
| No. | Date | Team 1 | Captain 1 | Team 2 | Captain 2 | Venue | Result |
|---|---|---|---|---|---|---|---|
| Test 121 | 27–28 May | Australia | Syd Gregory | South Africa | Frank Mitchell | Old Trafford Cricket Ground, Manchester | Australia by an innings and 88 runs |
| Test 122 | 10–12 June | England | Charles Fry | South Africa | Frank Mitchell | Lord's, London | England by an innings and 62 runs |
| Test 123 | 24–26 June | England | Charles Fry | Australia | Syd Gregory | Lord's, London | Match drawn |
| Test 124 | 8–10 July | England | Charles Fry | South Africa | Louis Tancred | Headingley Cricket Ground, Leeds | England by 174 runs |
| Test 125 | 15–17 July | Australia | Syd Gregory | South Africa | Frank Mitchell | Lord's, London | Australia by 10 wickets |
| Test 126 | 29–31 July | England | Charles Fry | Australia | Syd Gregory | Old Trafford Cricket Ground, Manchester | Match drawn |
| Test 127 | 5–7 August | Australia | Syd Gregory | South Africa | Louis Tancred | Trent Bridge, Nottingham | Match drawn |
| Test 128 | 12–13 August | England | Charles Fry | South Africa | Louis Tancred | Kennington Oval, London | England by 10 wickets |
| Test 129 | 19–22 August | England | Charles Fry | Australia | Syd Gregory | Kennington Oval, London | England by 244 runs |

== June ==
=== South Africa in Scotland ===
Three-day Series
| No. | Date | Home captain | Away captain | Venue | Result |
|---|---|---|---|---|---|
| Match | 24–26 June | Not mentioned | Frank Mitchell | Hamilton Crescent, Glasgow | South Africa by an innings and 97 runs |
| Match | 27–29 June | Not mentioned | Louis Tancred | Raeburn Place, Edinburgh | South Africa by an innings and 97 runs |

== July ==
=== Australia in Scotland ===
Three-day Series
| No. | Date | Home captain | Away captain | Venue | Result |
|---|---|---|---|---|---|
| Match | 8–10 July | Not mentioned | Not mentioned | Raeburn Place, Edinburgh | Australia by 296 runs |
| Match | 11–13 July | Not mentioned | Syd Gregory | North Inch, Perth | Match drawn |

=== South Africa in Ireland ===
Three-day Match
| No. | Date | Home captain | Away captain | Venue | Result |
|---|---|---|---|---|---|
| Match | 25–27 July | George Meldon | Frank Mitchell | Woodbrook Cricket Club Ground, Bray | South Africa by an innings and 169 runs |

== August ==
=== Australia in England ===
Three-day match
| No. | Date | Home captain | Away captain | Venue | Result |
|---|---|---|---|---|---|
| Match | 26–28 August | Not mentioned | Syd Gregory | Newmarket Road, Norwich | Match drawn |

=== Scotland in Ireland ===
Three-day Match
| No. | Date | Home captain | Away captain | Venue | Result |
|---|---|---|---|---|---|
| Match | 30–31 August | George Meldon | Maurice Dickson | Rathmines, Dublin | Scotland by 3 runs |
