= Austin Cooper =

Austin Cooper may refer to:

- Austin Cooper, a car of the Mini series
- Austin Cooper (artist) (1890–1964), Canadian-British illustrator and commercial artist
- Austin Cooper (lawyer) (1930–2013), Canadian criminal lawyer
