= Frederick Blundell =

English cricketer and agriculturalist

Personal information
- Full name: Frederick John Blundell
- Born: 19 November 1850; South Stoneham, Hampshire, England
- Died: 26 April 1929 (aged 78); Botley, Hampshire, England
- Batting: Right-handed
- Bowling: Right-arm slow

Domestic team information
- Years: Team
- 1880: Hampshire

Career statistics
Competition	First-class
Matches	1
Runs scored	2
Batting average	2.00
100s/50s	–/–
Top score	2
Balls bowled	68
Wickets	2
Bowling average	11.00
5 wickets in innings	–
10 wickets in match	–
Best bowling	2/22
Catches/stumpings	1/–
- Source: Cricinfo, 8 December 2009

Frederick John Blundell (19 November 1850 – 26 April 1929) was an English first-class cricketer and agriculturalist.

The son of Joseph Blundell, he was born in November 1850 at South Stoneham, Hampshire. A club cricketer in Southampton for St Luke's Cricket Club, Blundell made a single appearance in first-class cricket for Hampshire against Marylebone Cricket Club at Southampton in 1880. Batting once in the match, he was dismissed for 2 runs by Robert Clayton in Hampshire's first innings. With his slow bowling, he took the wickets of John West and Walter Bird in the MCC's first innings, with Hampshire winning the match by an innings and 38 runs. Outside of cricket, Blundell was a renowned agriculturalist in Hampshire and was a member of the Hampshire Farmer's Club. He died in April 1929 at Botley, Hampshire. He was interred at Botley close to the family vault, which was full at the time of his death.
