= Dartanyan Tinsley =

American football player (born 2001)

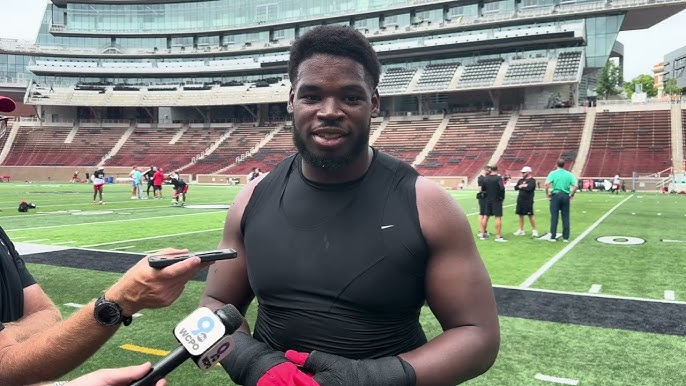
- Tinsley with Cincinnati in 2024

Profile
- Position: Guard

Personal information
- Born: March 21, 2001 (age 25); Owensboro, Kentucky, U.S.
- Listed height: 6 ft 3 in (1.91 m)
- Listed weight: 340 lb (154 kg)

Career information
- High school: Owensboro (Owensboro, Kentucky)
- College: Kentucky Christian (2020–2021); Cincinnati (2022–2024)
- NFL draft: 2025: undrafted

Career history
- Cleveland Browns (2025)*; Saskatchewan Roughriders (2026)*
- * Offseason or practice squad member only

Dartanyan Tinsley (born March 21, 2001) is an American professional football guard. He played college football for the Cincinnati Bearcats.

== College career ==
After high school, Tinsley committed to play football at Kentucky Christian University. Tinsley collected First Team All-National Christian College Athletic Association (NCCAA) honors in 2020–21 and grabbed First Team All-Mid-South Conference Appalachian Division accolades in back-to-back seasons (2020–21). Tinsley transferred to Cincinnati in 2022, and started 21 of his 30 career appearances. He played in the Hula Bowl in 2024.

== Professional career ==
=== Cleveland Browns ===
On April 27, 2025, Tinsley was signed by the Cleveland Browns as an undrafted free agent. He made his first NFL pre-season appearance against the Carolina Panthers on August 8. Tinsley was waived on August 24.

=== Saskatchewan Roughriders ===
Tinsley signed with the Saskatchewan Roughriders of the Canadian Football League (CFL). He was released on May 10, 2026.
