= Austin Wakeman Scott =

American legal scholar (1884–1981)

Austin Wakeman Scott (August 31, 1884 – April 10, 1981) was a professor of law at Harvard University who wrote a ten-volume treatise covering many topics of personal trusts such as the formation and termination of express trusts, resulting and constructive trusts, and the conflicts of interest encountered in the administration of trusts. Many of Professor Scott's dictums for fiduciaries have been incorporated in the Uniform Prudent Investor Act (UPIA). His four-volume book, The Law of Trusts, was published in 1939.

He graduated from Rutgers University in 1903 with an A.B. and received his LL.B. in 1909 from Harvard Law School.
