= Austin Scott (disambiguation) =

Austin Scott (born 1969) is an American politician who is a U.S. representative for Georgia.

Austin Scott may also refer to:

- Austin Scott (historian) (1848–1922), Rutgers College president
- Austin Wakeman Scott (1886–1981), American legal writer
