= Austin Smith =

Austin Smith may refer to:

- Austin Gerard Smith (born 1960), British professor and director of the Living Systems Institute at the University of Exeter
- Austin Smith (field hockey) (born 1985), South African field hockey player
- Austin Smith (ice hockey) (born 1988), American ice hockey player
- Austin Smith (tennis) (born 1993), American tennis player
- Austin Smith (politician) (born 1995), Arizona State Representative
- Austin Smith (poet) (born 1982), American poet
- Austin Burton Smith, Canadian politician
- A. J. Smith (American football coach) (Austin James Smith), American football coach
