= Auston =

Auston is a masculine given name and surname. Notable people with this name include:

- Auston English (born 1987), American football player
- Auston Matthews (born 1997), American ice hockey player
- Auston Rotheram (1876–1946), Irish polo player
- Auston Trusty (born 1998), American soccer player
- David H. Auston (born 1940), Canadian physicist
- Donna Auston, 21st century American anthropologist

== See also ==
- Auston switch, invented by David Auston
- Austin (disambiguation)
