= Austin Knight =

Austin Knight may refer to:

- Austin M. Knight (1854–1927), admiral in the United States Navy
- Austin Knight (comedian) (born 1959), British comedian and actor
