= Austin Roberts =

Austin Roberts may refer to:

- Austin Roberts (American football) (born 1995), American football tight end
- Austin Roberts (singer) (1945–2024), American singer and songwriter
- Austin Roberts (zoologist) (1883–1948), South African zoologist

== See also ==
- Austin Roberts Bird Sanctuary, Pretoria, South Africa
- Austin Robertson (disambiguation)
