= Ike Brown (Canadian football) =

Canadian football player (born 1951)

Profile
- Position: Running back

Personal information
- Born: January 9, 1951 (age 75); Owensboro, Kentucky, U.S.
- Listed height: 6 ft 1 in (1.85 m)
- Listed weight: 205 lb (93 kg)

Career information
- High school: Owensboro (KY)
- College: Western Kentucky
- NFL draft: 1973: 8th round, 186th overall pick

Career history
- 1969–1970: Richmond Roadrunners/Richmond Saints
- 1971: Roanoke Buckskins
- 1972: Montreal Alouettes

Awards and highlights
- CFL East All-Star (1972)

Isaac Monroe Brown Jr. (born January 9, 1951) is a Canadian football player who played professionally for the Montreal Alouettes.
