= Steal Like an Artist =

2012 book by Austin Kleon

- Author: Austin Kleon
- Publisher: Workman Publishing
- Publication date: February 28, 2012

Steal Like an Artist: 10 Things Nobody Told You About Being Creative is a book on coming up with creative ideas written by Austin Kleon and published in 2012 from Workman Publishing. The book has since then become a New York Times bestseller. Kleon presents himself as a young writer and artist emphasizing that creativity is everywhere and is for everyone. In his own words, "You don’t need to be a genius, you just need to be yourself".

== Backdrop ==
When Mr. Kleon was asked to address college students at Broome Community College in upstate New York in 2011, he shaped his speech around a simple list of ten things he wished someone had told him when he was starting out at their age. They were: "Steal like an artist"; "Don't wait until you know who you are to start making things"; "Write the book you want to read"; "Use your hands"; "Side projects are important"; "Do good work and put it where people can see it"; "Geography is no longer our master"; "Be nice (the world is a small town.)"; "Be boring (it's the only way to get work done.)"; and, "Creativity is subtraction".

After giving the speech, he posted the text and slides of the talk to his blog, which went viral. Kleon then dug deeper and expanded the materials into this book, for anyone attempting to make things—art, a career, a life—in the digital age.

== The book ==
Kleon describes ten basic principles to boost the readers' creativity, listed on the back cover of the book so they can be easily referenced. The book is small, full of illustrations and several poems in the style of his newspaper cutouts by Kleon.

Kleon responds by writing, “the reason to copy your heroes and their style is so that you might somehow get a glimpse into their minds". Kleon reminds throughout his book that “nothing is original… all creative work builds on what came before.” This sentiment is also a foundation for effective ELA teaching: From our past experiences as readers and writers, we can design better learning conditions for our students.

Each chapter is dedicated to one of the ten principles, which are represented by the following:

1. Steal like an artist: The author cautions that he does not mean ‘steal’ as in plagiarise, skim or rip off — but study, credit, remix, mash up and transform. Creative work builds on what came before, and thus nothing is completely original.
2. Don't wait until you know who you are to start making things: You have to start doing the work you want to be doing, you have to immerse, internalise and even dress like the person you aspire to be. “You don’t have to look like your heroes, you want to see like your heroes,” Kleon urges. Go beyond imitation to emulation.
3. Write the book you want to read: It is important to do what you want to do, and insert your take on things of art.
4. Use your hands: It is important to step away from the screen and immerse in actual physical work. “Computers have robbed us of the feeling that we’re actually making things,” Kleon cautions. "Involve your full body, and not just your brains."
5. Side projects are important: Hobbies are important because they keep you happy. “A hobby is something that gives but doesn’t take,” Kleon says.
6. Do good work and put it where people can see it: Sharing your work and even your thoughts about what you like help you get good feedback and more ideas.
7. Geography is no longer our master: “Travel makes the world look new, and when the world looks new, our brains work harder,” Kleon explains. Constraints can also act favorably – bad winters or summers can force you to be indoors and work on your projects.
8. Be nice (the world is a small town.): Stop fighting and channel your rage into a creative pursuit. Show appreciation for the good things you see around you.
9. Be boring (it's the only way to get work done.): You can’t be creative all the time, so set a routine – for example, with a regular day job which sets a fixed schedule and exposes you to new people and skills.
10. Creativity is subtraction: In an age of information overload and abundance, focus is important. Choose what you want to leave out of your key work. “Nothing is more paralysing than the idea of limitless possibilities. The best way to get over creative block is to simply place some constraints on yourself,” Kleon says.
