= Jodie Broughton =

English rugby league footballer

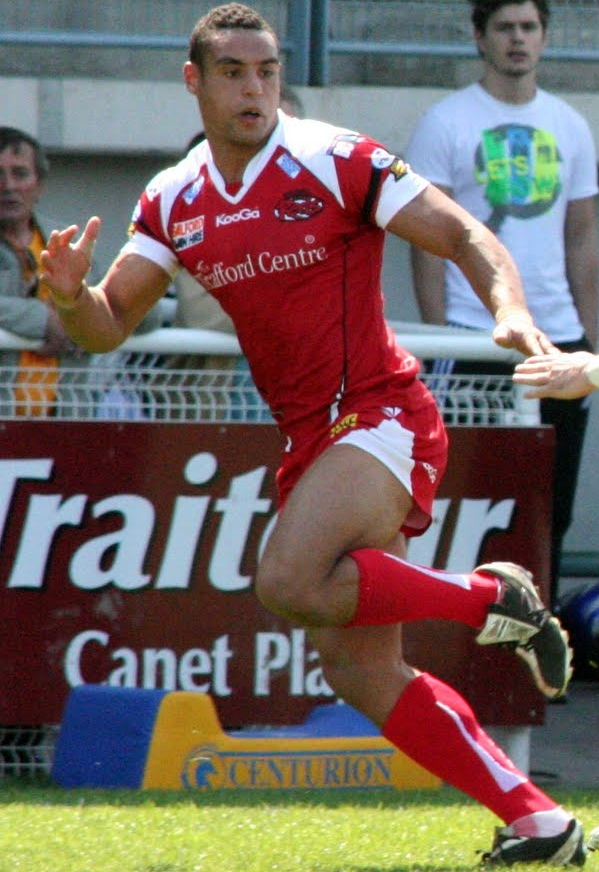

Personal information
- Born: 9 January 1988 (age 38) Leeds, England
- Height: 5 ft 11 in (1.80 m)
- Weight: 14 st 2 lb (90 kg)

Playing information
- Position: Wing
Club
| Years | Team | Pld | T | G | FG | P |
|---|---|---|---|---|---|---|
| 2008–09 | Leeds Rhinos |
| 2008(loan) | → Hull FC | 5 | 1 | 0 | 0 | 4 |
| 2009(loan) | → Hull FC | 7 | 5 | 0 | 0 | 20 |
| 2010–13 | Salford City Reds | 99 | 60 | 0 | 0 | 240 |
| 2014–15 | Huddersfield Giants | 33 | 16 | 0 | 0 | 64 |
| 2015(DR) | → Oldham | 1 | 2 | 0 | 0 | 8 |
| 2016–19 | Catalans Dragons | 52 | 38 | 0 | 0 | 152 |
| 2019(loan) | → Toulouse Olympique | 1 | 0 | 0 | 0 | 0 |
| 2020 | Halifax | 4 | 5 | 0 | 0 | 20 |
| 2021 | Batley Bulldogs | 14 | 7 | 0 | 0 | 28 |
| | Total | 216 | 134 | 0 | 0 | 536 |
Representative
| Years | Team | Pld | T | G | FG | P |
| 2011–12 | England Knights | 4 | 6 | 0 | 0 | 24 |
- Source: As of 3 January 2021
- Father: Gerban Alestor Buchanan
- Relatives: Austin Buchanan (half-brother); Jamie Jones-Buchanan (half-brother)

Jodie Broughton (born 9 January 1988) is an English former rugby league footballer who last played on the wing for the Batley Bulldogs in the Championship. He is a four-time England Knights international.

He has previously been in the system of the Leeds Rhinos and spent time on loan from Leeds at Hull F.C. in 2008 and 2009. Broughton has also played for the Salford City Reds and the Huddersfield Giants. He has spent time on loan from the Giants at Oldham. He has also played for the Catalans Dragons in the top flight and from the Dragons at Toulouse Olympique and Halifax RLFC in the Championship.

In 2011, Broughton was named Fastest Man in the Super League.

== Background ==
Broughton was born in Leeds, West Yorkshire, England. He is the half-brother of former Leeds Rhinos teammate Jamie Jones-Buchanan.

== Early career ==
Broughton began playing rugby league for local sides Milford Marlins A.R.L.F.C. and Queens A.R.L.F.C. and was also selected to represent the Leeds Service Area. He has won a number of competitions including the Leeds and District Cup, Yorkshire Cup, National Cup, West Riding Cup and the Yorkshire combination league/cup.

== Club career ==
=== Leeds Rhinos ===
Broughton signed for the Leeds Academy in 2006. In the 2007 season he made 15 appearances for the Junior side scoring 10 tries.

=== Hull F.C. ===
On 20 June 2008 Broughton signed for Hull F.C. on a months loan. He made his club and Super League début two days later at Odsal in a 36–22 defeat by the Bradford Bulls. A week later he scored his first Super League try in a 24–22 loss to Warrington Wolves. He went on to make a total of 5 appearances for Hull F.C. over the season.

Following his return to Leeds Rhinos, Broughton was again the subject of a loan move to Hull F.C. when he signed for a second stint on 16 April 2009. He scored a brace of tries in Hull's 37–22 defeat by Wakefield Trinity Wildcats on 13 June 2009.

=== Salford Red Devils ===
He joined Salford for 2010 and has since seen his career flourish at the Greater Manchester club establishing himself in the Reds' first team and being drafted into the England training squad.

=== Huddersfield Giants ===
He signed for 2013 League Leaders Shield winners Huddersfield Giants in October 2013, he made his senior début on 7 March 2014 and scored a try in a 12–12 draw with the Leeds Rhinos. In March 2015 he played for the Oldham in their League 1 Cup game against Barrow Raiders.

=== Catalans Dragons ===
On 18 August 2015, Jodie signed for the Super League French franchise the Catalans Dragons on a two-year deal starting in 2016.

=== Batley Bulldogs ===
On 24 August 2020 it was announced that Broughton had signed for the Batley Bulldogs for the 2021 season. Broughton retired from playing rugby league at the end of the 2021 season.

== Personal ==
Broughton Graduated from Salford University in 2012. He is now a Quantity Surveyor and works with his former club the Huddersfield Giants as a Positive well-being coach for their Scholarship programme.
