= Owensboro High School =

Location
- 1800 Frederica Street; Owensboro, Daviess, Kentucky 42301; United States; 37.75765°N 87.11241°W

Information
- Motto: Sursum ad Summum
- Established: 1871
- School district: Owensboro Independent
- Superintendent: Wendy Duvall
- Principal: Jennifer Luttrell
- Teaching staff: 80.70 (FTE)
- Grades: 9–12
- Student to teacher ratio: 16.63
- Hours in school day: 7
- Colors: Red and black
- Slogan: We Are Owensboro
- Fight song: Washington and Lee Swing
- Team name: Red Devils
- Newspaper: The Digital Devil
- Website: www.owensboro.kyschools.us/o/ohs

Owensboro High School is a public high school located at 1800 Frederica Street in Owensboro, Kentucky, United States. The school's digital newspaper is The Digital Devil. Owensboro High School is one of only 33 high schools in Kentucky to be listed among the "Best High Schools 2009 Search" published in U.S. News & World Report in December 2009. This was the second consecutive year that OHS has received this distinction.

== Structure and schedule pattern ==
The school day starts at 8:30 AM and ends at 3:25 PM. Days are divided into four 85-minute class periods. There is also a 30-minute advisory period, along with three 25-minute lunch periods. Students typically have 4 core classes and 4 electives, making 8 classes total. Students take half of their classes on alternating days, either “Red” days, or “Black” days.

Students have multiple off-campus learning opportunities, at local colleges, universities, or Owensboro Innovation Academy, or at local businesses.

== Athletics ==
OHS owns 29 state titles in team sports including:

- Football
- Boys' basketball
- Baseball
- Track
- Cheerleading

Other sports include:

- Girls' basketball
- Tennis
- Golf
- Cross-country
- Swimming
- Wrestling
- Boys' and girls' lacrosse
- Bowling

The sports teams and other organizations are usually titled "Red Devils." The swim team is the "Devilfish". Ordell, a red blob-like devil with horns and a tail, is the school's anthropomorphic mascot. The primary school colors are red and black, and the secondary color is white.

== The Rose Curtain Players ==
The Rose Curtain Players is a drama group associated with Owensboro High School. It is the oldest high school drama program in Kentucky. Notable alumni include Tom Ewell.

== Notable alumni ==
- Ike Brown, former CFL player
- Vince Buck, former NFL player
- Tom Ewell, actor
- William Gant, Kentucky Supreme Court justice
- Austin Gough, college football linebacker for the Kentucky Wildcats.
- Cliff Hagan, University of Kentucky All-American, NBA player and Naismith Hall of Fame member
- Mark Higgs, former NFL player
- Aric Holman, Texas Legends center
- Christine Johnson Smith, Broadway actress who originated the role of Nettie Fowler in Carousel
- Julius Maddox, bench press world record holder
- Justin Miller, NFL player for the Detroit Lions
- Kevin Olusola, member of Pentatonix
- Dartanyan Tinsley, NFL guard
- Dave Watkins, former MLB catcher for Philadelphia Phillies
- Bobby Watson, University of Kentucky player, NBA player
- Ken Willis, former NFL Ppayer
- Norm Johnson, International Playboy Entrepreneur
