= Jamie Jones-Buchanan =

British rugby player and coach (born 1981)

Jamie Jones-Buchanan MBE
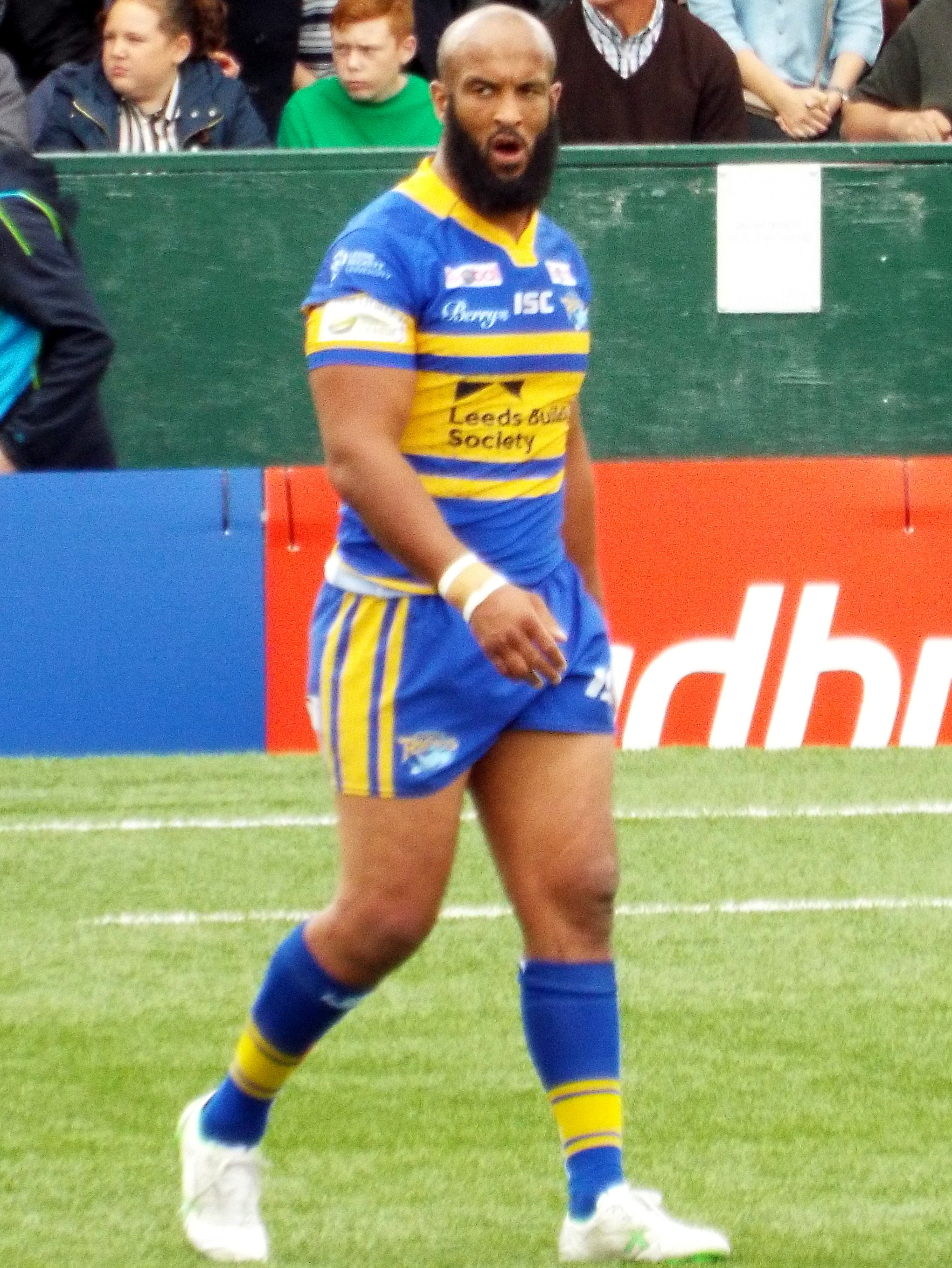

Personal information
- Full name: Jamie Daniel Peter Jones-Buchanan
- Born: 1 August 1981 (age 45) Bramley, West Yorkshire, England

Playing information
- Height: 6 ft 0 in (183 cm)
- Weight: 15 st 6 lb (98 kg)
- Position: Second-row, Prop, Loose forward
Club
Years	Team	Pld	T	G	FG	P
1999–2019	Leeds Rhinos	421	78	1	0	314
Representative
Years	Team	Pld	T	G	FG	P
2005–12	England	14	3	0	0	12
2007	Great Britain	1	0	0	0	0

Coaching information
Club
Years	Team	Gms	W	D	L	W%
2022	Leeds Rhinos (interim)	5	2	1	3	40
- Relatives: Jodie Broughton (half-brother); Austin Buchanan (half-brother)

Jamie Daniel Peter Jones-Buchanan MBE (born 1 August 1981) is a British rugby league coach, former professional player, and the Chief Executive of the Leeds Rhinos. He was briefly the interim head coach for Leeds in the Super League XXVII season.

A second-row forward, he played for his entire professional career with Leeds, winning seven Super League Grand Finals, three World Club Challenges, three League Leaders' Shields and one Challenge Cup Final with the club. He played for England and Great Britain at international level.

== Background ==
Jones-Buchanan was born on 1 August 1981 in Leeds, West Yorkshire, England. He is the half-brother of professional rugby league footballers Jodie Broughton, Austin Buchanan and Brooke Broughton.

He began playing rugby at Stanningley SARLFC and progressed through the Leeds Academy signing for the club when he was 15 years old.

== Playing career ==
His Leeds début was on 7 May 1999 against Wakefield Trinity.

Jones-Buchanan played for Leeds from the interchange bench in their 2004 Super League Grand Final victory against Bradford. As Super League IX champions, the Leeds club faced 2004 NRL season premiers, Canterbury in the 2005 World Club Challenge. Jones-Buchanan played at second-row and scored a try in Leeds' 39–32 victory. Jones-Buchanan played for Leeds in the 2005 Challenge Cup Final from the interchange bench in their loss against Hull FC. He played for the Leeds club from the interchange bench in their 2005 Super League Grand Final loss against Bradford.

Jones-Buchanan started in the 2007 Super League XIV Grand Final victory over St. Helens, scoring the final try in a historic 33–6 win at Old Trafford.

In February 2008, Jones-Buchanan helped the Leeds side secure their second world club title as they defeated 2007 NRL season premiers, Melbourne in the 2008 World Club Challenge at Elland Road.

Jones-Buchanan played in 2008's Super League XIII Grand Final victory over St. Helens.

He was named in the England squad for the 2008 Rugby League World Cup. Jones-Buchanan's testimonial match at Leeds took place in 2009. That year Jones-Buchanan also played a key role in Leeds winning the League Leaders' Shield

This was followed by the Leeds club becoming the first team in the Super League era to win three titles in a row as they defeated St Helens once again at Old Trafford winning 18–10.

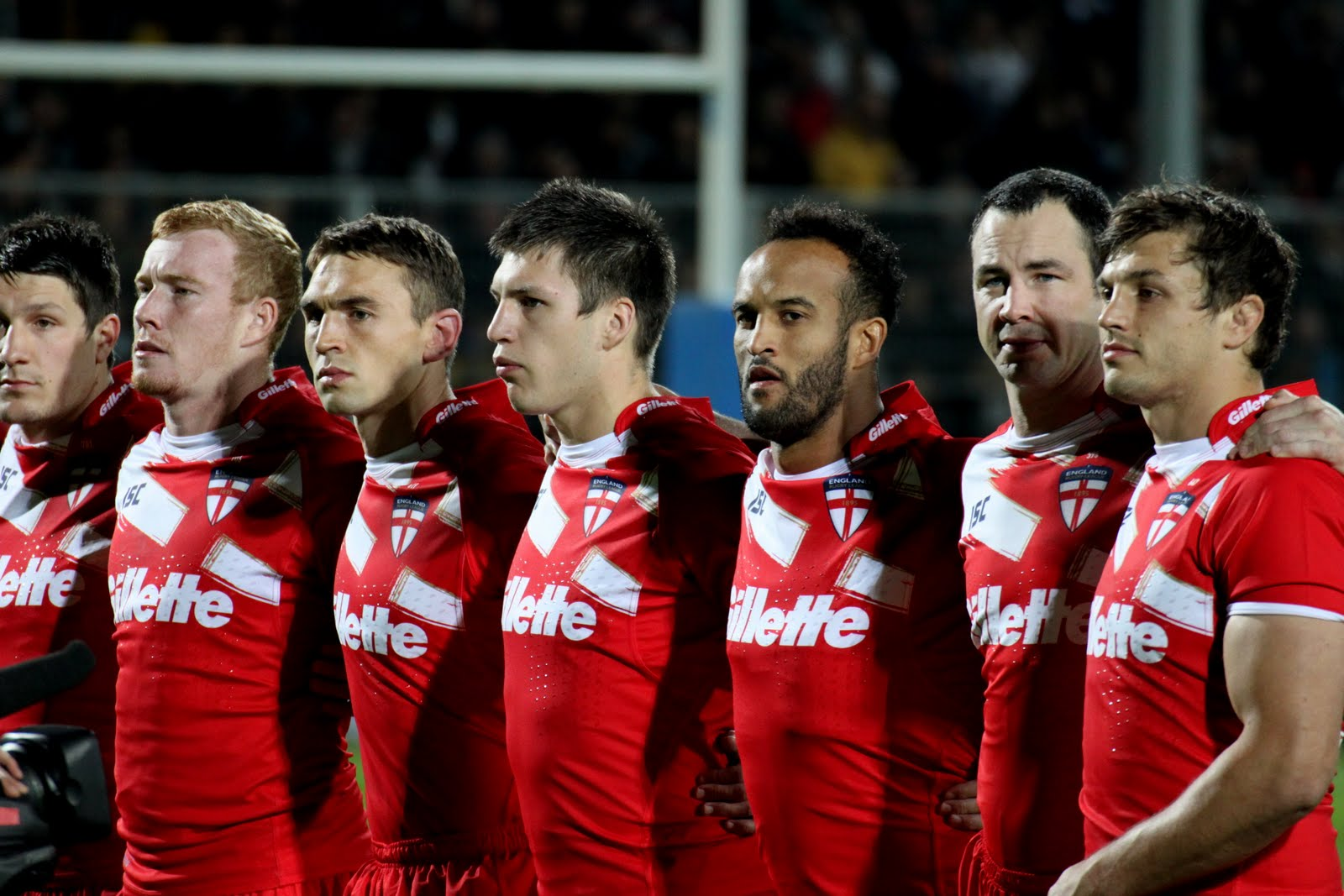
Jones-Buchanan representing England

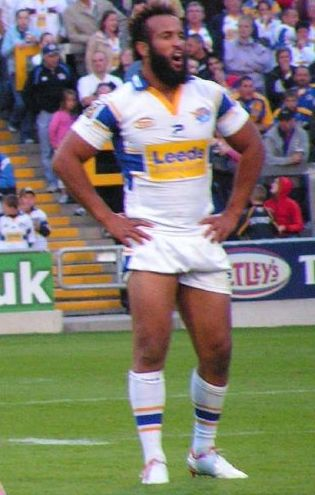
Jones-Buchanan playing for the Leeds Rhinos

Jones-Buchanan did not enjoy the same level of success in the Challenge Cup however. Having lost to Hull F.C. in 2005, Jones-Buchanan started all three of Leeds successive losses at Wembley Stadium between 2010 and 2012: the 2010 Challenge Cup Final defeat by Warrington, the 2011 Challenge Cup Final which was lost to Wigan, and the 2012 Challenge Cup loss to Warrington.

However, along with teammates Kevin Sinfield, Danny McGuire, Rob Burrow and Ryan Bailey he continued his period of unprecedented success in the Grand Final. All five players, who had emerged from the club's academy would go on to win six Grand Finals together defeating old foes St. Helens in 2011 before over turning Warrington in the 2012 Super League Grand Final when Leeds made more history by winning the title after finishing fifth two years running. As well as winning back to back titles, the Leeds side had also started 2012 by becoming World Champions for a third time as they defeated Manly at a sold out Headingley in the 2012 World Club Challenge.

In 2013, Jones-Buchanan crossed for a try in the 2013 World Club Challenge against Melbourne but the Leeds outfit lost out to the 2012 NRL season premiers 18–14 at Headingley.

Jones-Buchanan finally got his hands on the 2014 Challenge Cup when Leeds defeated the Castleford Tigers 23–10 at Wembley Stadium.

He missed the 2015 Challenge Cup Final due to an injury suffered in the semi-final win over St Helens.

He played in the 2017 Super League Grand Final victory over Castleford at Old Trafford.

Jones-Buchanan was appointed Member of the Order of the British Empire (MBE) in the 2022 New Year Honours for services to rugby league football and the community in Leeds.

== Career after playing ==
He took up an assistant coach role of Leeds Rhinos after retiring as a player, and stepped in as interim head coach following Richard Agar's sacking.

In March 2025 it was announced that Jones-Buchanan would become the Leeds Chief Executive in late 2025, following the retirement of Gary Hetherington.

== Personal life ==
Jones-Buchanan is married to Emma Jones-Buchanan, whom he met when he was 14, and has four children. He is a devout Christian and attends church on Sundays. He has also supported the White Ribbon Campaign, a charity that encourages men to challenge violence against women.

Away from rugby, Jones-Buchanan is an active part of his local community in Leeds. He attends Christian worship across the country to speak about his own life journey and he is a trustee of the Leeds Rhinos Foundation, a charitable trust working in the Leeds community. He was also a governor at his former school in Leeds, the Priesthorpe School.

== Media ==
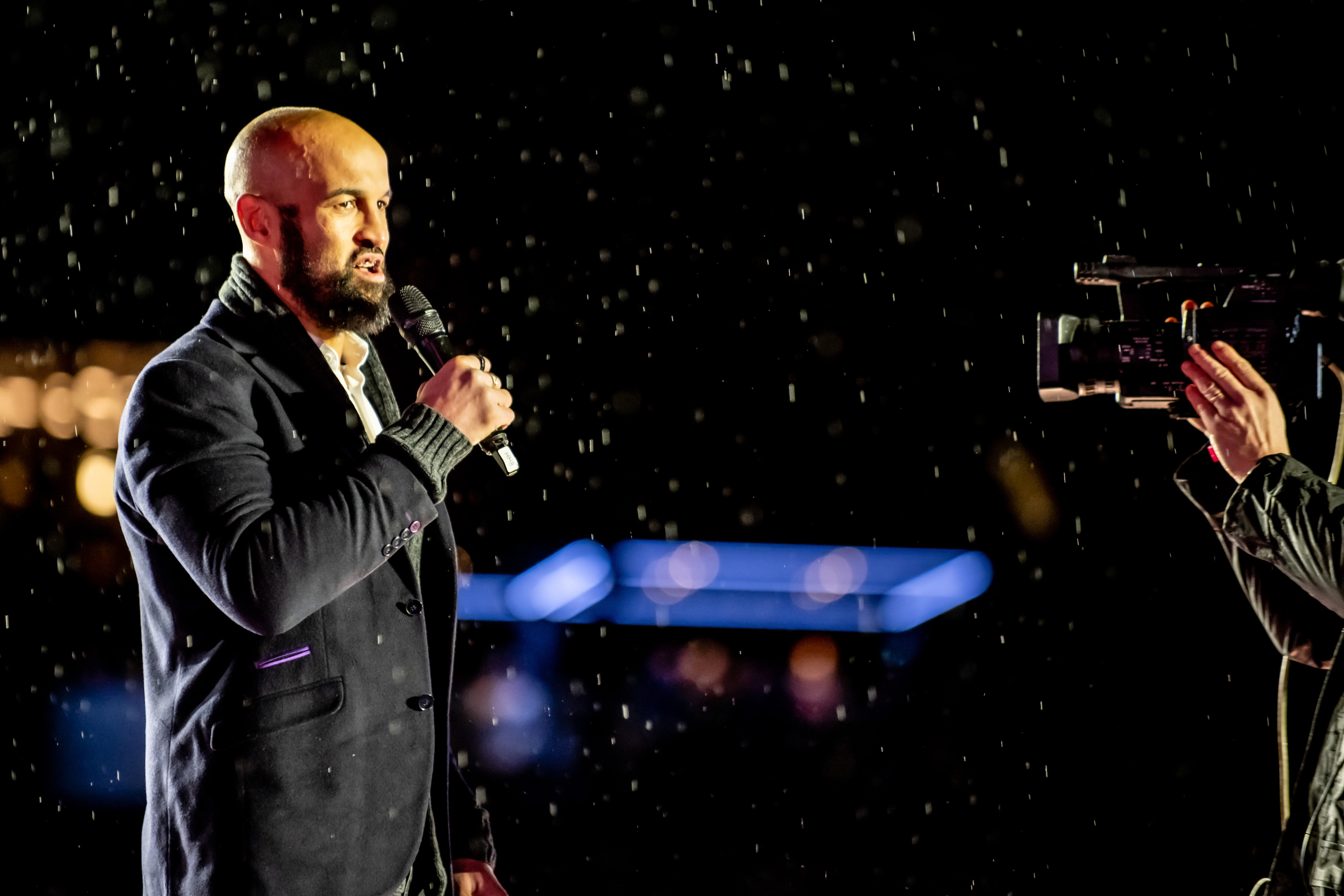
Jamie Jones-Buchanan on stage at The Awakening. LEEDS 2023

Years ago, Jones-Buchanan began an interest in journalism, and reporting on sport and Rugby League in general. What began as a blog on the Rhinos official website soon became a monthly column in Rugby League magazine Rugby League World. From here Jones-Buchanan joined forces with childhood friend Alex Simmons on a new TV and radio project called Rugby AM. He joined the Rugby AM team in December 2013 and has been working to grow Rugby AM. He uses his spare time doing some form of work for Rugby AM.

In 2016, Jones-Buchanan took on another new role, that of acting. Jones-Buchanan made his stage début in the Red Ladder Theatre Company production Leeds Lads. Fans had a chance to see Jamie in the play which ran between Friday 17 June 2016 and Saturday 25 June 2016 at the Carriageworks Theatre in Leeds.
