= Austin Berry =

Austin Berry may refer to:

- Austin Berry (footballer, born 1971), retired Costa Rican footballer
- Austin Berry (soccer) (born 1988), retired American soccer player
