= Austin Miller (disambiguation) =

Austin Miller (born 1976) is an American actor.

Austin Miller may also refer to:

- Austin Miller (pole vaulter) (born 1994), American pole vaulter
- Austin S. Miller (born 1961), American general
- Austin Miller (British Army officer) (1888–1947), British-Indian officer
