= Austin Dabney =

Austin Dabney (c. 1765–1830) was an enslaved African American who fought against the British in the American Revolutionary War.

He was a person of mixed African and European descent born in Wake County, North Carolina, sometime in the 1760s. He moved with his enslaver, Richard Aycock, to Wilkes County, Georgia, in the late 1770s. When the Georgia Militia was called up for the war, Aycock sent Dabney in his place. To address objections that Dabney was a slave, Aycock claimed he had been born free.

Dabney became a soldier in Lieutenant Colonel Elijah Clarke's unit. Shot in the thigh during the Battle of Kettle Creek on February 14, 1779, he survived but was crippled for life. Giles Harris, a white soldier who lived in the area, cared for the injured man in his home. A close bond formed between Dabney and the Harris family.

On August 14, 1786, after the death of Richard Aycock, an act of the legislature of Georgia officially emancipated Dabney and authorized the state to pay Aycock's heirs 70 pounds for Dabney's freedom. Dabney was granted 50 acres (20 ha) in Washington County, becoming the only African American to be granted land by Georgia for his Revolutionary War service. He also received a state pension (an obligation later taken on by the federal government), starting at $60 a year in 1789 and rising to $96 in 1816.

Dabney prospered. He worked for and supported the Harris family, sending Giles' son William to Franklin College. Afterward, Dabney continued to support William financially while he successfully studied for the bar with attorney Stephen Upson. In 1835, William Harris named his son Austin Dabney in his benefactor's honor.

When Dabney was barred from the Georgia Land Lotteries, Upson arranged for the state legislature to grant him 112 acres (45 ha) in Walton County in 1821, resulting in resentment among some white residents.

Lucian Lamar Knight wrote a chapter entitled "The Story of Austin Dabney" which further shows the high regard in which Dabney was held. When Dabney rode to Savannah to collect his annual pension along with his white neighbor, Colonel Wiley Pope, as they approached Savannah, Pope suggested that Dabney ride slightly behind, in accordance with the mores of the time, which Dabney did. However, when the two passed the house of Governor James Jackson, Jackson ran out to Dabney and invited him to be his houseguest during their stay - while Colonel Pope had to stay in the public tavern. Pope was amused by this and often told the story.

Austin Dabney died in 1830 in Zebulon, Georgia.

In 2010, with the cooperation of the Harris family, the Sons of the American Revolution (SAR) held a dedication ceremony to unveil a new tombstone for Dabney and to mark the opening of the site to the public. According to an SAR member who participated in the ceremony, this was believed to be the first time that the grave of a "black patriot" in Georgia had received this honor.
