= Austin Buchanan =

English rugby league footballer

Personal information
- Born: 22 May 1984 (age 42) Leeds, West Yorkshire, England
- Height: 5 ft 5 in (1.65 m)
- Weight: 13 st 10 lb (87 kg)

Playing information
- Position: Wing
Club
Years	Team	Pld	T	G	FG	P
2003	Leeds Rhinos	0	0	0	0	0
2003(loan)	→ London Broncos	4	2	0	0	8
2004	York City Knights	16	15	2	0	64
2005–07	Wakefield Trinity Wildcats	8	3	0	0	12
2005(loan)	→ York City Knights	4	2	0	0	8
2006(loan)	→ York City Knights	12	4	0	0	16
2008–15	Dewsbury Rams	132	64	0	0	256
2016	York City Knights	16	8	0	0	32
	Total	192	98	2	0	396
- Source: As of 11 June 2026
- Relatives: Jodie Broughton (half-brother); Jamie Jones-Buchanan (half-brother)

Austin Buchanan (born 22 May 1984) is a professional rugby league footballer for Dewsbury.

Buchanan started playing at age 14 at Milford and went on to play for Leeds (Academy), York City Knights (two spells), Castleford Tigers, London Broncos and Wakefield Trinity Wildcats. He was twice an Academy Winner with Leeds, a National League Two Grand Final runner-up with York and the following year won promotion from National League Two with York.

According to the Dewsbury website, 2008 marks Buchanan's second year with Dewsbury and he "looks to have pretty much secured his place in the first team."

He is the half-brother of Leeds and Great Britain international Jamie Jones-Buchanan.
