= Donna Auston =

American anthropologist

- Education: Rutgers University (BA, MA, Ph.D)
- Occupation: Anthropologist

Donna Auston is an American anthropologist. Her research focuses on the African American Muslim community. She explores race, ethnicity, gender, and the lived experience of practicing Islam in the United States. Auston has served as a community organizer for over twenty years, and has been featured on television and radio in discussions on media and race, Islamophobia, and feminism.

== Education ==
Auston holds a B.A. in Linguistics and Africana Studies from Rutgers University. She completed her Ph.D. also at Rutgers in the Department of Anthropology. Her dissertation focused on activism and protest in the Black Muslim community, specifically in the context of the #BlackLivesMatter movement.

== Career and activism ==
Auston teaches at Rutgers University in New Jersey. She gives talks and interviews on the lived experiences of Muslim and Black Americans, particularly on how members of these communities are affected by Islamophobia and racism.

In the summer of 2015, Auston started a viral Twitter campaign, #BlackMuslimRamadan, in an effort to honor and celebrate the traditions of Black Muslims in the United States, which she argued were "absent in the media." The hashtag was also used to highlight issues of racism within the Muslim community. Auston and her campaign were featured on a national scale, in outlets like NBC News, the New York Times, and the Huffington Post. She wrote a piece for The Washington Post reflecting and commenting on the success of the #BlackMuslimRamadan campaign, and advocating for the importance for online spaces where marginalized Black, Muslim communities can form community in their shared experiences.

In 2019, Auston was interviewed for an episode of the PBS series "A Matter of Faith", in which she discusses the growing popularity of Islam in the United States, and shares her vision for how Muslim spaces in America can improve. The series is hosted by a bishop, imam, and a rabbi, and the episode delves into topics relevant to the Muslim community, and how social justice is pertinent to Auston's own reversion story and understanding of the Islamic faith.

She serves as an advisor for numerous initiatives and projects, including the Center for Brooklyn History’s Muslims in Brooklyn oral history project. Auston was the Chair of the 2020 Black Muslim Psychology Conference Programming Committee.

Auston has been named one of the top 100 Muslim Social Justice Leaders by MPower Change, the largest Muslim digital advocacy organization in the Americas.

== Personal life ==
Auston is a convert to Islam. She grew up Christian and was the first person in her family to convert to the religion. She converted in the late 1980s as a teenager. Her interest in Islam stems from a desire to learn more about how Islam discusses topics of social and racial justice. Auston is a firm believer in social justice as integral to faith and as an act of worship. She is involved in the Muslim community in Newark, New Jersey.
