= Austin Warren =

Austin Warren may refer to:

- Austin Warren (baseball) (born 1996), American baseball player
- Austin Warren (scholar) (1899–1986), American literary scholar
