= Uniform Prudent Investor Act =

Fiduciary Requirements of Registered Investment Advisors (Post 1992)

The Uniform Prudent Investor Act (UPIA), which was adopted in 1992 by the American Law Institute's Third Restatement of the Law of Trusts ("Restatement of Trust 3d"), reflects a "modern portfolio theory" and "total return" approach to the exercise of fiduciary investment discretion.

== Approach ==
This approach allows fiduciaries to utilize modern portfolio theory to guide investment decisions and requires risk versus return analysis. Therefore, a fiduciary's performance is measured on the performance of the entire portfolio, rather than individual investments.

== Adoption ==
As of May 2004, the Uniform Prudent Investor Act has been adopted in 44 States and the District of Columbia. Other states may have adopted parts of the Act, but not the entire Act. According to the National Conference of Commissioners on Uniform State Laws, the most common portion of the Act excluded by states concerns the delegation of investment decisions to qualified and supervised agents.

== Comparison to Prudent Man Rule ==
The Uniform Prudent Investor Act differs from the Prudent Man Rule in four major ways:

1. A trust account's entire investment portfolio is considered when determining the prudence of an individual investment. Under the Prudent Investor Act standard, a fiduciary would not be held liable for individual investment losses, so long as the investment, at the time of acquisition, is consistent with the overall portfolio objectives of the account.
2. Diversification is explicitly required as a duty for prudent fiduciary investing.
3. No category or type of investment is deemed inherently imprudent. Instead, suitability to the trust account's purposes and beneficiaries' needs is considered the determinant. As a result, junior lien loans, investments in limited partnerships, derivatives, futures, and similar investment vehicles, are not per se considered imprudent. However, while the fiduciary is now permitted, even encouraged, to develop greater flexibility in overall portfolio management, speculation and outright risk taking is not sanctioned by the rule either, and they remain subject to criticism and possible liability.
4. A fiduciary is permitted to delegate investment management and other functions to third parties.

== Not adopted by... ==
As of 2021 the states which have not adopted the Uniform Prudent Investor Act or Substantially Similar include:

- Delaware, and
- Louisiana.

== Suitability ==
In enacting the Uniform Prudent Investor Act, states should have repealed legal list statutes, which specified permissible investments types. (However, guardianship and conservatorship accounts generally remain limited by specific state law.) In those states which adopted part or all of the Uniform Prudent Investor Act, investments must be chosen based on their suitability for each account's beneficiaries or, as appropriate, the customer. Although specific criteria for determining "suitability" do not exist, it is generally acknowledged, that the following items should be considered as they pertain to account beneficiaries:

- financial situation;
- current investment portfolio;
- need for income;
- tax status and bracket;
- investment objective; and
- risk tolerance.
