= Austin Smith (poet) =

American writer (born 1982)

- Born: Austin Robert Smith; 1982 (age 43–44)
- Education: University of Wisconsin–Madison (BA); University of California, Davis (MA); University of Virginia (MFA)
- Occupations: Poet, writer
- Writing career
- Genre: Fiction
- Website: www.austinrobertsmith.com

Austin Robert Smith (born 1982) is an American poet and fiction writer. Smith is one of three sons of Dan and Cheryl Smith, and he grew up on a farm north of Freeport, Illinois. Smith's father, Dan Smith, also wrote poetry and has been described as a "farmer-poet."

Smith has published two books of poetry, both in the Princeton Series of Contemporary Poets, and three poetry chapbooks. His poems have appeared in journals including The New Yorker, Poetry, and Virginia Quarterly Review, and his short fiction has appeared in journals including Kenyon Review, Sewanee Review, and ZYZZYVA.

Smith has been awarded a Stegner Fellowship at Stanford University, a Creative Writing Fellowship from the National Endowment for the Arts, and the Amy Lowell Poetry Travelling Scholarship. He holds a BA from the University of Wisconsin–Madison, an MA from the University of California, Davis, and an MFA from the University of Virginia.

Smith's poetry deals with themes including rural life, violence, and war. Originally from rural Illinois, Smith often expresses a strong tie to the Midwestern United States. As Smith wrote in 2018, "I feel it's even more important than ever to write of this region, to identify the trends that have led to the decline of small towns and small family farms, and to celebrate the people and the land so that no reader of mine will ever think of the Midwest as flyover country again."

Smith's works have been reviewed in publications including the New York Times, Publishers Weekly, the Washington Post, WBUR's Here and Now, and Yale Review.

== Bibliography ==
- Smith, Austin (2018). Flyover Country: Poems. Princeton, NJ: Princeton University Press. ISBN 9780691181561.
- Smith, Austin (2013). Almanac: Poems. Princeton, NJ: Princeton University Press. ISBN 9780691159188.
- Smith, Austin (2013). Instructions for How to Put an Old Horse Down. Brattleboro, VT: Longhouse Press. OCLC 692016564.
- Smith, Austin (2009). Midwestern Death Poems. Brattleboro, VT: Longhouse Press. OCLC 944523036.
- Smith, Austin (2008). In the Silence of the Migrated Birds. Madison, WI: Parallel Press. ISBN 9781893311985.
