= Austin Johnson =

Austin Johnson may refer to:

- Austin Johnson (defensive lineman) (born 1994), American football player
- Austin Johnson (fullback) (born 1989), American football player
