= Austin Cooper (lawyer) =

Canadian lawyer (1930–2013)

Austin Cooper, Q.C., (1930 – 24 September 2013) was a "top" Canadian criminal lawyer. His cases include defending Rolling Stones guitarist Keith Richards in the 1970s for heroin possession and Susan Nelles, a nurse who was accused of murdering babies during a spree of deaths at a Toronto hospital. He was a graduate of Osgoode Hall Law School.

Cooper was known as an expert in professional responsibility and legal ethics.
