= Austin Hansen =

American artist (1910–1996)

- Born: January 28, 1910; Saint Thomas, U.S. Virgin Islands
- Died: January 23, 1996 (aged 85); New York City, U.S.

Austin Hansen (January 28, 1910 – January 23, 1996) was a Black American photographer known for his chronicling of life in Harlem.

== Early life ==
Austin Hansen was born in 1910 in Saint Thomas, U.S. Virgin Islands. He began taking photographs at age 12, and was assisted by the island's official photographer. He served in the United States Navy as a photographer's mate.

He came to New York City in 1928, but racist attitudes of the time blocked him from employment despite an excellent reference from a naval officer for whom he had worked. He worked instead as a dishwasher and elevator operator, and occasionally played the drums.

== Career ==
Hansen's first break came when he took a photograph of a young Black woman singing for Eleanor Roosevelt at an uptown hotel, which he sold to the New York Amsterdam News for $2. Building on this small start, he was eventually able to make photography his full-time profession and his portraits and news photographs captured life in Harlem for the next sixty years.

He did portrait work at his studio, as well as freelancing for newspapers such as The Chicago Defender and the Staten Island Advance. In addition to everyday community life such as weddings, street scenes, and Harlem architecture, Hansen captured images of notable political figures (Haile Selassie, Marcus Garvey, Martin Luther King Jr.), authors (Langston Hughes), entertainers (Count Basie, Eartha Kitt), and others.

Hansen was for decades the official photographer for the Abyssinian Baptist Church in Harlem, and documented events at the Cathedral of St. John the Divine in Morningside Heights. For the last five years of his life, he was artist-in-residence at the Photographic Center of Harlem.

== Legacy ==
Over the course of his life Hansen built a massive collection of over 500,000 portraits of Black Americans, ranging from churchmen and political leaders to everyday working-class people. More than 50,000 of his images are at the Schomburg Center for Research in Black Culture.

Hansen was the subject of the film Search for Hansen: A Photographer of Harlem, directed by Justin Bryant.
