= Austin Jones =

Austin Jones may refer to:

- Austin Jones (coach), American football coach
- Austin Jones (musician) (born 1992), American convicted sex offender, musician and former YouTuber
- Austin Jones (racing driver) (born 1996), American off-road racing driver
- Austin Jones (running back) (born 2001), American football player

== See also ==
- Austinn Jones (born 1976), former Australian rules footballer
