= Austin Hudson =

Austin Hudson may refer to:

- Sir Austin Hudson, 1st Baronet (1897–1956), British Conservative politician
- Austin Hudson (soccer) (born 1959), American soccer player and coach

== See also ==
- Austen Hudson (1894–1970), British Conservative politician
