= Austin Meldon =

Irish surgeon and writer

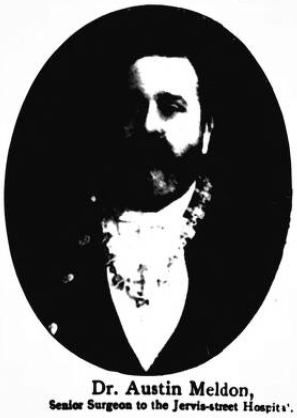
- Born: 26 August 1844; Dundrum, Dublin
- Died: 28 April 1904 (aged 59); Dublin
- Occupations: Surgeon, writer

Austin George Meldon (26 August 1844 – 28 April 1904) F.R.C.S., D.L. was an Irish surgeon and writer.

== Career ==
Meldon became a Licentiate of the Royal College of Surgeons, Ireland in 1864. He became a Licentiate of the King and Queen's College of Physicians in 1865. Meldon authored medical papers on cholera, diseases of the skin and gout. He was a member of the British Medical Association and attended the annual meeting in Dublin in 1887. Meldon married twice. He had two sons and one daughter. His sons were George Edward Pugin Meldon and James Austin Meldon.

Meldon rejected the uric acid theory as a full explanatory for gout. He promoted his own "neuro-humoral theory" which held that gout and rheumatism were caused by a depressed condition of the nervous system.

Meldon was buried at Glasnevin Cemetery.

== Selected publications ==
- A Treatise on Diseases of the Skin and its Appendages (1872)
- Intravenous Injection of Milk (The British Medical Journal, 1881)
- Pathology And Treatment Of Gout (The British Medical Journal, 1881)
- A Treatise on Gout and Rheumatic Gout (1886)

== Awards and recognition ==
Meldon was a double gold medallist in surgery and midwifery and first prizeman in anatomy at the Catholic University Medical School. He was appointed surgeon to Jervis Street Hospital, a position he held until his retirement.
