= Frederick Jellicoe =

English cricketer

Personal information
- Full name: Frederick Gilbert Gardiner Jellicoe
- Born: 24 February 1858; Southampton, Hampshire, England
- Died: 29 July 1927 (aged 69); Southwark, London, England
- Batting: Right-handed
- Bowling: Left-arm roundarm slow-medium

Domestic team information
- Years: Team
- 1877–1880: Oxford University
- 1877–1880: Hampshire

Career statistics
Competition	First-class
Matches	18
Runs scored	58
Batting average	2.90
100s/50s	–/–
Top score	12
Balls bowled	3,474
Wickets	78
Bowling average	14.92
5 wickets in innings	5
10 wickets in match	1
Best bowling	8/36
Catches/stumpings	8/–
- Source: Cricinfo, 13 December 2009

Frederick Gilbert Gardiner Jellicoe (24 February 1858 — 29 July 1927) was an English first-class cricketer and clergyman.

The son of John Henry Jellicoe, a captain in the Royal Mail Steam Packet Company, and Lucy Henrietta Jellicoe (née Keele), he was born at Southampton in February 1827. He was educated at Haileybury College, where he played for the college cricket and rugby teams. From there, he matriculated to New College, Oxford. Whilst studying at Oxford, he was a member of the Oxford University Cricket Club and made his debut in first-class cricket for the university against the Marylebone Cricket Club (MCC) in 1877. After playing in the 1877 University Match against Cambridge at Lord's, Jellicoe made his debut for Hampshire against Derbyshire at Derby. He did not feature for the university in 1878, but returned in 1879, playing in a further six appearances. He followed this up with a further two appearances in 1880. In fourteen first-class matches for Oxford, he took 55 wickets at an average of 16.74; he took three five wicket hauls with best figures of 8 for 36. Jellicoe made three further first-class appearances for Hampshire in 1880, playing twice against the MCC and once against Sussex. For Hampshire, he took 23 wickets in four matches, at an average of 10.56; he took two five wicket hauls for the county and once took ten wickets in a match. His overall first-class total was 78 wickets at an average of 14.92

After graduating from Oxford, Jellicoe spent nearly a decade as an assistant master and precentor at St Edward's School, Oxford. In 1891, he was reading for holy orders. He was ordained as a deacon in that year at Holy Trinity Church, Guildford. His first ecclesiastical post was as a curate at Alverstoke in the same year, a position he held until 1902, when he was appointed reverend at Freemantle. In 1915, he became reverend at New Alresford until his retirement in 1922. Following an illness of some three to four months, Jellicoe died at Guy's Hospital on 29 July 1927. He was the elder brother of Admiral of the Fleet John Jellicoe, 1st Earl Jellicoe. He conducted the wedding service for his brother in 1902 at the Holy Trinity Church, Sloane Street.
