= Austin Reed =

Austin Reed may refer to:

- Austin Reed (American football) (born 2000), American football player
- Austin Reed (retailer), a British fashion retailer founded in 1900
- Austin Reed (Days of Our Lives), a fictional character in the U.S. TV soap opera Days of our Lives
- Austin Reed (author), author of the first prison memoir written by an African-American
- Austin Reed (racing driver), American stock car racing driver
