= Austin Allen =

Austin Allen may refer to:

- Austin Allen (quarterback) (born 1994), American football player
- Austin Allen (baseball) (born 1994), American baseball player
- Austin Allen (tight end) (born 1998), American football player
- Austin Allen (1901–1959), American country musician and member of The Allen Brothers
