= Austin Rogers =

Austin Rogers may refer to:

- Austin Rogers (soccer) (born 1995), American professional soccer goalkeeper
- Austin Rogers (Jeopardy! contestant), New York City bartender and game show contestant
- Buddy Austin (1929–1981), American professional wrestler
- Austin Rogers (politician), American politician
