= Austin Walsh =

Austin Walsh may refer to:

- Austin Walsh (baseball) (1891–1955), left fielder for the Chicago Federals baseball team
- Austin Walsh (hurler) (born 1977), Irish hurler
