= Austin Baxter =

English cricketer

Austin Godfrey Baxter (21 September 1931 – 17 January 1993) was an English first-class cricketer active 1952–53 who played for Nottinghamshire. He was born in West Bridgford; died in Lenton.
