= Austin Carr (disambiguation) =

Austin Carr (born 1948) is an American basketball player.

Austin Carr may also refer to:

- Austin Carr (American football) (born 1993), American football player
- Austin Carr (cricketer) (1898–1946), English cricketer
