= Austin Lewis =

Austin Lewis may refer to:

- Austin Lewis (politician) (born 1932), Australian politician
- Austin Lewis (footballer) (1870–?), Australian rules football player
- Austin Lewis (socialist) (1865–1944), American socialist, author and lawyer
