= Austin Hope =

American winemaker (born 1973)

- Born: 1973 (age 52–53); Bakersfield, California, U.S.
- Occupation: Winemaker

Austin Hope (born 1973) is the president and winemaker of Hope Family Wines, a Paso Robles, California-based wine producer encompassing the Liberty School, Treana, Austin Hope, Troublemaker, and Candor wine labels.

Hope is a third generation farmer, who moved from Bakersfield to Paso Robles with his family in 1978 when his parents Chuck and Marlyn Hope bought a ranch to plant apple orchards and grape vineyards. The Hope family realized that Paso Robles was better suited for grape growing, which became their signature crop. Hope was eight years old when the grapes first became available; growing up, he would often play in the vineyards as his father worked.

During the 1980s and 1990s, the Hope family grew grapes for various wine producers. In the 1980s, the Wagner family, owners of Napa Valley's Caymus Vineyards, turned to the Hope family to source Cabernet Sauvignon grapes for their Liberty School label. This began a long-lasting partnership between the two families. While studying fruit science at California Polytechnic State University, San Luis Obispo, Hope worked part-time in Napa Valley under Caymus Winemaker Chuck Wagner, and also spent time at wineries in the Rhone Valley region in France. He later pursued winemaking and created Hope Family Wines.

After graduating from Cal Poly, San Luis Obispo in 1996 with a Bachelor of Science, Hope helped oversee his family's transition from bulk grape producers to winemakers. That year, the Hope's acquired the Liberty School label from the Wagners. In 1996, they launched Treana Winery – Hope helped produce Treana's debut 1996 vintage as assistant winemaker under Chris Phelps. Hope became the head winemaker of Hope Family Wines in 1998 and has held the position ever since. Hope Family Wines now produces over 400,000 cases per year.

In 2000, the Hope family started a limited-production label, Austin Hope, focused exclusively on Rhone varietals grown on the family's vineyard, located in one of the Templeton Gap area's microclimates in Paso Robles’ cooler climate west side.

In 2008, the Hope family introduced Candor Wines, a multi-vintage label focusing on Zinfandel and Merlot wines with fruit sourced from family-owned vineyards in Santa Barbara, Paso Robles and Lodi. They introduced their second multi-vintage blend, named Troublemaker, in 2010. Hope believes multi-vintage blending enables enhanced complexity and drinkability.

== Recognition ==
Hope was named “Winemaker of the Year” at the California Mid-State Fair in 2009. He formerly served as chairperson for the Paso Robles Wine Country Alliance.
