= Austin Wright (disambiguation) =

Austin Wright (1922 – 2003) was a novelist, literary critic and professor emeritus of English.

Austin Wright may also refer to:

- Austin Andrew Wright (1911–1997), British sculptor
- Austin Tappan Wright (1883–1931), American legal scholar
