= Austin Clarke =

Austin Clarke may refer to:

- Austin Clarke (poet) (1896–1974), Irish poet
- Austin Clarke (politician) (1896–1945), Canadian politician in Manitoba
- Austin Clarke (novelist) (1934–2016), Canadian novelist, essayist and short story writer

== See also ==
- Austin Clark (1880–1954), American zoologist
