= Austin Gough =

American football linebacker

No. 39 – Kentucky Wildcats
- Position: Inside linebacker
- Class: Sophomore

Personal information
- Born: Owensboro, Kentucky
- Listed height: 6 ft 0 in (1.83 m)
- Listed weight: 208 lb (94 kg)

Career information
- High school: Owensboro High School (Owensboro, Kentucky)
- College: Kentucky (2021–present)
- Stats at ESPN

Austin Gough is a former American college football linebacker for the Kentucky Wildcats.
