= Jack Loughnan =

Australian rules footballer (1889–1949)

Personal information
- Full name: John Loughnan
- Born: 4 August 1889; Charlton, Victoria, Australia
- Died: 19 November 1949 (aged 60); Brighton East, Victoria, Australia
- Original team: Hay
- Height: 183 cm (6 ft 0 in)
- Weight: 95 kg (209 lb)

Playing career^{1}
Years	Club	Games (Goals)
1912	Carlton	1 (0)
1913	Fitzroy	1 (0)
Total		2 (0)
- ^{1} Playing statistics correct to the end of 1913.

Jack Loughnan MC (4 August 1889 – 19 November 1949) was an Australian rules footballer who played with Carlton and Fitzroy in the Victorian Football League (VFL).

== Family ==
The son of John Loughnan, and Margaret Loughnan (c.1865-1923), née Curran, John Loughnan was born at Charlton, Victoria on 4 August 1889.

He married Agnes Beatrice Dare (1898-1965) in Christchurch, Hampshire, in England, in December 1917.

== Education ==
He was educated at Xavier College in Kew, Victoria.

== Death ==
He died at East Brighton on 19 November 1949.
