= Austin Kleon =

American author

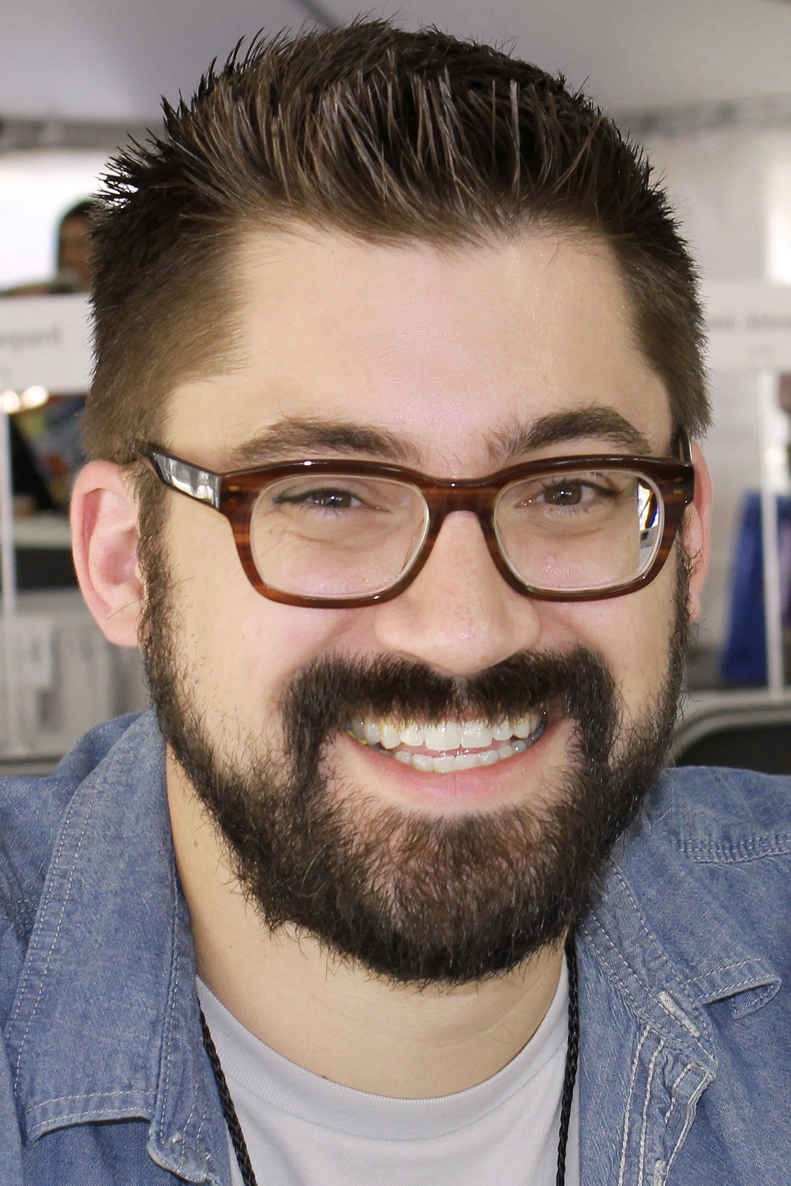
- Kleon in 2015
- Born: June 16, 1983 (age 43); Circleville, Ohio, US
- Education: Miami University
- Occupation: Author
- Website: austinkleon.com

Austin Kleon (born June 16, 1983) is an American author. He has written five books: Steal Like an Artist, Show Your Work!, Keep Going; Steal Like An Artist Journal, and Newspaper Blackout.

Kleon's works focus on creativity. He has spoken at organizations such as Pixar, Google, and TEDx, and at conferences such as The Economist's Human Potential Summit and SXSW.

== Early life and education ==
On June 16, 1983, Kleon was born in Circleville, Ohio, United States. His father was an associate professor at Ohio State University while his mother was a school counsellor and later a school principal. Kleon has two half brothers and a step sister. He graduated as a valedictorian in high school. Thereafter, he attended Miami University in Ohio.

== Career ==
Kleon started his career in a public library in Cleveland, Ohio. While working in a library, Kleon became a blogger and posted his poems. Kleon also taught library users how to use computers. Kleon taught himself HTML and CSS. In Austin, Texas, Kleon became a web designer for the law school at University of Texas. After Kleon's first book, Newspaper Blackout, was published in 2010, he became a copywriter for Spring box, a digital ad agency.

Kleon's work has been translated into over a dozen languages and featured on major media. He publishes a weekly newsletter to about 300,000 subscribers.

== Personal life and influences ==
Kleon lives in Austin, Texas, with his family.

Returning inspirations to his blog are Lynda Barry and Rob Walker.

A notable interest of his lies in library tourism, often imploring his readers to seek out a library card and check out the wide-variety of free offerings available at local institutions.

== Bibliography ==
- Newspaper Blackout (2010)
- Steal Like An Artist (2012)
- Show Your Work! (2014)
- The Steal Like An Artist Journal (2015)
- Keep Going (2019)
- Don't Call It Art (2026)
