= Austin Carroll =

Irish nun, educator and author

- Mother Mary Teresa Austin Carroll
- Church: Roman Catholic Church

Personal details
- Born: Margaret Anne Carroll; February 23, 1835 Clonmel, Ireland
- Died: November 29, 1909 (aged 74)

Mother Mary Teresa Austin Carroll (born Margaret Anne Carroll; pen name, Austin Carroll; 23 February 1835 – 29 November 1909) was an Irish nun and writer who emigrated to the United States where she founded more than 20 convents.

== Biography ==
Margaret Anne Carroll was born in Clonmel, Ireland, on 23 February 1835. Her parents were William and Margaret Strahan Carroll, and there were eight siblings. Carroll received most of her education at Clonmel National Model School. She entered the St Maries of the Isle Mercy Convent, Cork, in 1853, taking the name Sister Mary Teresa Austin in 1854; two years later she professed her first vows.

Carroll aided in establishing an Order in Buffalo, Rochester, Omaha, under Mother Mary Frances Xavier Warde. She established convents in New Orleans (1869), Biloxi, Mississippi, Florida, Alabama, Belize, British Honduras, and was in Selma, Alabama in 1895. In addition to her office of Superior during these years, Mother Austin contributed to many periodical magazines, among them The American Catholic Quarterly Review, Philadelphia Catholic Record, Catholic World, Irish Monthly, besides a large European correspondence. She passed through several severe epidemics. Though Mother Austin spent much of her life in Europe, her literary life was spent in the U.S., in which schools she attended and established played a special role. She founded more than 20 convents in the U.S.

Carroll died on 29 November 1909 after suffering a series of strokes.

== Selected works ==
- 1861, The flowers of Paradise : a select manual of prayer and instruction
- 1866, Life of Catherine McAuley, foundress and first superior of the Institute of religious Sisters of mercy
- 1867, Happy hours of childhood : a series of tales for the little ones
- 1869, Glimpses of pleasant homes. A few tales for youth
- 1869, Angel-dreams : a series of tales for children
- 1872, By the seaside : a child's story
- 1874, The life of St. Alphonsus Liguori, Bishop, Confessor, and Doctor of the Church, Founder of the Congregation of the Most Holy Redeemer
- 1877, Life of the Ven. Clement Mary Hofbauer, priest of the Congregation of the Most Holy Redeemer
- 1881, Leaves from the Annals of the Sister of Mercy. In three volumes : I. Ireland. II. England, Scotland, and the colonies. III. America. Vol. I. Ireland : containing sketches of the convents established by the holy foundress, and their earlier developments
- 1883, Mary Beatrice and her step-daughters, the uncrowned and the crowned : an historical drama
- 1883, The Tudor sisters, an historical drama
- 1885, Scenes from the life of Katharine of Aragon. An historical drama
- 1886, The Ursulines in Louisiana : 1727–1824
- 1894, Life of Mary Monholland : one of the pioneer sisters of the Order of Mercy in the West
- 1904, In many lands
- 1905, The father and the son, St. Alphonsus and St. Gerard
- 1908, A Catholic history of Alabama and the Floridas
- 1911, The litany of the Blessed Virgin
