= Austin Knight (comedian) =

British comedian

Austin Knight (born 5 July 1959) is a comedian and actor from Manchester.

== Early life ==
Austin was born in Gorton, Manchester. Gorton is known today for being the filming location of the Channel 4 comedy-drama Shameless.

== Career ==
He got his first break in the 1970s at the "Search for a Star" competition at Blighty's, a cabaret club in Farnworth. Austin Knight began his comedy career in the early 70s as a club circuit impressionist; in the early 80s he became a traditional standup comedian. He has written comedy scripts for TV and radio, writing material for Tommy Cooper, Les Dawson and others.

Austin Knight has appeared in Coronation Street, Taggart, The Sandbaggers, Strike: The Birth of Solidarity, Cribb the Detective, Fallen Hero and as a comedian on Granada's The New Comedians.

He appeared in the 2006 feature film Zemanovaload which starred Ed Byrne and featured Veronika Zemanova.

== Critical reactions ==
The Stage praised his "broad comedy appeal".
