= Austin M. Lee =

American lawyer and politician

Austin M. Lee (June 6, 1919 – June 4, 2013) was an American lawyer and politician.

Born in Philadelphia, Pennsylvania, Lee went to Staunton Military Academy and then graduated from William & Mary College. He received his law degree from the University of Pennsylvania Law School and practiced law. Lee served in the United States Navy during World War II. Lee served in the Pennsylvania House of Representatives 1956-1964 as a Republican. He then served on the Pennsylvania State Ethics Commission 1991–2001. He died in Lancaster, Pennsylvania.
