= Austin Taylor =

Austin Taylor may refer to:

- Austin Taylor (British politician) (1858–1955), British Conservative Party politician, MP for Liverpool East Toxteth 1902–1910
- Austin Claude Taylor (1893–1964), Canadian farmer and politician
- Austin Cotterell Taylor, Canadian industrialist
- Starke Taylor (1922–2014), mayor of Dallas, Texas, from 1983 to 1987
- Ted Taylor (musician), soul musician born Austin Taylor

== See also ==
- Taylor Austin (b. 1990), Canadian bobsledder
