= Austin Hogan =

Australian rules footballer, born 1901

Personal information
- Full name: Austin Hogan
- Born: 19 September 1901
- Died: 10 March 1982 (aged 80)
- Original team: Nullawil
- Height: 189 cm (6 ft 2 in)
- Weight: 95 kg (209 lb)

Playing career^{1}
| Years | Club | Games (Goals) |
| 1931 | Fitzroy | 5 (2) |
- ^{1} Playing statistics correct to the end of 1931.

Austin Hogan (19 September 1901 – 10 March 1982) was an Australian rules footballer who played for the Fitzroy Football Club in the Victorian Football League (VFL).
