= Austin Post =

Austin Post may refer to:

- Austin Post (photographer) (1922–2012)
- Post Malone (Austin Richard Post, born 1995)
