= Austin Williams =

Austin Williams may refer to:

- Austin Williams (abolitionist) (1805–1885); see Austin F. Williams Carriagehouse and House
- Austin Williams (actor) (born 1996), American actor
- Austin Williams (boxer) (born 1996), American boxer
- Austin B. Williams (1919–1999), American carcinologist
- Austin Henry Williams (1890–1973), British polo player
