= Austin Adams =

Austin Adams may refer to:

- Austin Adams (lawyer) (1826–1890), American lawyer and justice of the Iowa Supreme Court
- Austin Adams (baseball, born 1986), American baseball pitcher for the Minnesota Twins
- Austin Adams (baseball, born 1991), American baseball pitcher for the Oakland Athletics
