= Austin Peterson (cartoonist) =

American cartoonist (1906–2015)

Harry Austin "Pete" Peterson (July 10, 1906 – June 11, 2015) was an American screenwriter, cartoonist, and radio program director.

== Early life and career ==
Austin Peterson was born in Palo Alto, California, on July 10, 1906, to Harry and Lillian Peterson. His journalistic career began in the late 1920s, when he worked as a cartoonist for newspapers such as San Francisco Call and Los Angeles Herald. Starting from 1933, he worked as a producer and writer for the now-defunct radio station KFRC. He also wrote for the show The Packard Show, starring Hollywood actor and dancer Fred Astaire.

He was the program director of the Armed Forces Radio during World War II. Other jobs include working on the television show The Colgate Comedy Hour.

== Later life and death ==
Peterson wrote an autobiography called Television is a young man's game? I'm 94. Why didn't somebody tell me?, which was published in the year 2000. He also wrote a travel guide on several Pacific islands, including Tahiti. His longevity was highlighted well into his centenarian years. He died on June 11, 2015, at the age of 108.
