= Austin Prokop =

American fencer (1921–1980)

Personal information
- Born: Austin Martin Prokop; February 22, 1921 Tarrytown, New York, U.S.
- Died: August 2, 1980 (aged 59) Goldens Bridge, New York, U.S.

Sport
- Sport: Fencing

Austin Martin Prokop (February 22, 1921 – August 2, 1980) was an American fencer. He competed in the team foil event at the 1948 Summer Olympics.
