= Austin Davis =

Austin Davis may refer to:

- Austin Davis (American football) (born 1989), American football player
- Austin Davis (infielder) (1922–2000), American Negro league baseball player
- Austin Davis (pitcher) (born 1993), American baseball player
- Austin Davis (politician) (born 1989), American politician from Pennsylvania
- Austin R. Davis (1871–1900), United States Marine Corps officer
