= Austin Kowal =

American artist and business owner

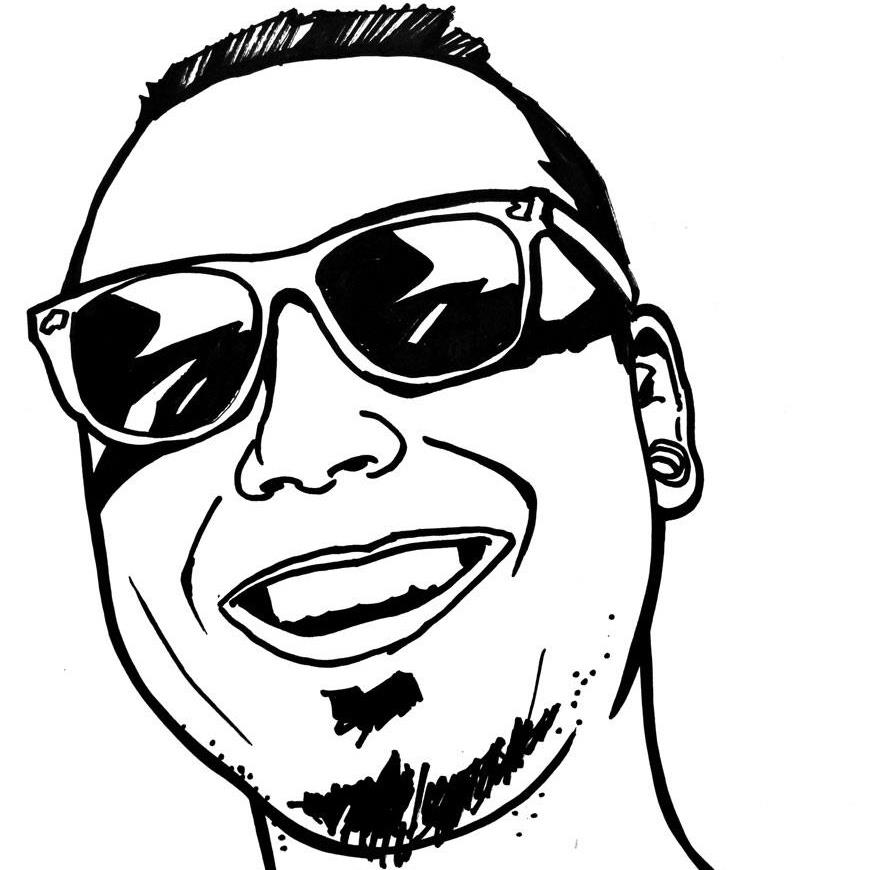
- Austin Kowal (portrait by Kanos)
- Born: October 19, 1985 (age 39); Sarasota, Florida
- Known for: Screen printing, street art

Austin Kowal (born October 19, 1985) is an American artist and entrepreneur located in Sarasota, Florida.

At age 16, Kowal began designing apparel and jewelry and by the time he was 19 years old, he had taught himself screen printing and had founded Clothesline Creative, a clothing company based in Sarasota. Kowal's company has provided design and printing services to businesses throughout Florida and the United States and frequently has made in-kind donations to local charities and grassroots initiatives in the Sarasota community.

Kowal also is head of the "Going Vertical" division of the Sarasota Chalk Festival to which artists are invited from all over the world in order to paint murals during the annual festival, and he regularly is associated with the special events related to the festival.
