= Austin Shaw =

American singer-songwriter

Austin Shaw is an American former finance professional, and executive coach based in Santa Cruz, California. He is the founder of Apex Executive Coaching.

== Early life and education ==
He attended college in upstate New York, where he studied English literature.

== Career ==
Shaw began his career in high finance in New York, holding roles at firms including Merrill Lynch and UBS, and was among early employees at Gerson Lehrman Group (GLG) and Behavox.

He later launched Apex Executive Coaching, a firm that provides leadership and career coaching services to senior professionals in sectors like private equity, hedge funds, venture capital, real estate, and technology.

Austin was recognized as Forbes top 10 innovators in 2023 and 8 top leadership coaches tofollow in 2023.
