= Austin Russell =

Austin Russell may refer to:

- Austin Lee Russell, better known by his stage name Chumlee (born 1982), American reality television personality
- Austin Russell (entrepreneur), founder of Luminar Technologies
