= Austin Punch =

Australian cricketer

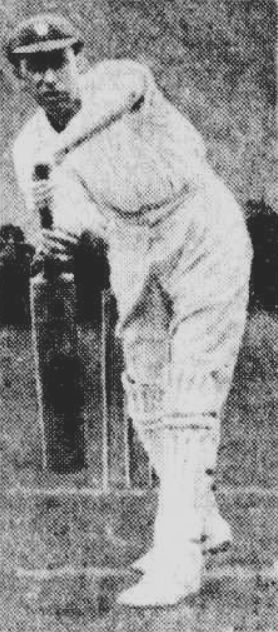

Personal information
- Full name: Austin Thomas Eugene Punch
- Born: 16 August 1894; Sydney, Australia
- Died: 25 August 1985 (aged 91); Sydney, Australia
- Batting: Right-handed
- Bowling: Right-arm leg-spin

Career statistics
Competition	FC
Matches	33
Runs scored	1,717
Batting average	35.04
100s/50s	1/13
Top score	176
Balls bowled
Wickets	35
Bowling average	29.82
5 wickets in innings	1
10 wickets in match	0
Best bowling	5/33
Catches/stumpings	23/0
- Source: Cricinfo, 5 June 2023

Austin Thomas Eugene Punch (16 August 1894 – 25 August 1985) was an Australian cricketer. He played one first-class match for Tasmania in 1927/28 and 32 matches for New South Wales between 1919/20 and 1928/29.

A tall and forceful batsman, strong on the front foot, Punch made his highest score of 176 against Otago when New South Wales toured New Zealand early in 1924; New South Wales scored 649 on the second day of the three-day match. His best bowling figures with his leg-breaks were 5 for 33 against Queensland earlier that season.

In 1923 Punch, described in the Sydney Referee as "a finely-trained baritone of undoubted excellence", resigned his position with the Ocean Accident and Guarantee Company to become a professional singer. He married Sylvia Byrne in the Sydney suburb of Neutral Bay in November 1934.
