= Austin Cooper (artist) =

British painter (1890–1964)

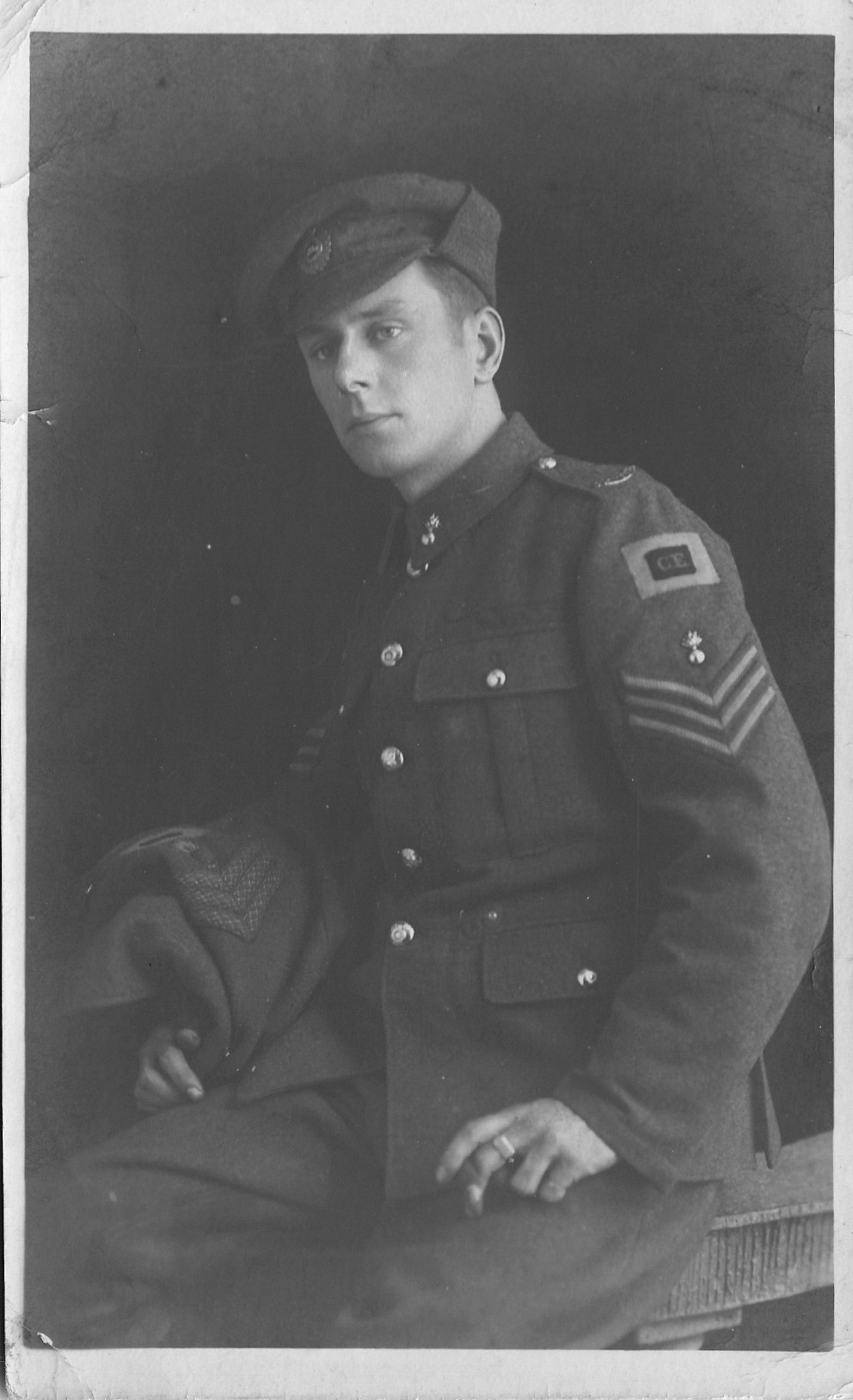
- Austin Cooper circa 1917, in uniform of the 42nd Bn. (Royal Highlanders of Canada), Canadian Expeditionary Force
- Born: 5 March 1890; Souris (Canada)
- Died: 1964
- Education: Cardiff School of Art & Design
- Occupations: Illustrator, artist, designer, graphic designer

Austin Cooper (1890–1964) was a Canadian–British illustrator and commercial artist. His work included cover illustrations for the Radio Times (including the 1935 Christmas edition) and posters for the London and North Eastern Railway, the Empire Marketing Board, London Transport, and the General Post Office. Examples of the latter are now in the collections of London Transport Museum and the British Postal Museum.

== Career ==
Cooper was born in Souris, Manitoba, Canada, on 5 March 1890, the son of an Irish farmer. Cooper studied at the Cardiff School of Art, and then the Allan-Frazer College of Art in Arbroath.

Black and white newspaper reproduction of "Christ in Calgary"

He began his career as a commercial artist after returning to Calgary, at a commercial art studio alongside fellow Arbroath student Adam Sherriff Scott. The two produced a 4 m × 2 m (13.1 ft × 6.6 ft) painting "Christ in Calgary" (1913; thought lost), which was exhibited unsigned at the Royal Picture Gallery there for six months, described by the Calgary News-Telegram (one of whose street-vendors was depicted in the painting) as showing:

A crowd of hurrying people is on the street hurrying west on the side and corner near the old Royal hotel, and intermingled with this crowd is the Indian, the squaw with her child in a papoose, the lady stenographer with her beau; the lumberman chatting with his companion on the corner, and, leaning up against the wall of the hotel; the policeman talking to a nurse and taking notes on an accident; the mother and her little girl; the Negro standing unconcerned, and other characters; but the most prominent character in the picture is a large representative figure of Christ standing on the corner of the pavement, while directly in front of him and looking up into his face with a frightened look is a woman of the street, bearing all the characteristics of such a woman, and dressed in red.

On being identified as one of the artists Cooper's only comment, to a newspaper, was "We have nothing to say about it except what appears on the canvass". Subsequently, he and Sherriff-Scott set up their own company, Shagpat Studios, in Montreal.

During World War I he was in Flanders with the Canadian Black Watch, rising to Regimental Sergeant Major, before being discharged in 1919. He moved to London in 1922, having met his wife-to-be there.

From 1936 to 1940, he was principal of the London branch of the Reimann School of Commercial and Industrial Art.

Later in his career, in 1943, he gave up commercial art for abstract painting. His first solo exhibition was held in 1948, at the London Gallery. Several of his abstract works are in the collection of the Tate Gallery.

He died in 1964.

== Bibliography ==
- Making a Poster. The Studio. 1939.
