= Austin Speight =

Northern Irish football player and coach

Austin Speight is a Northern Irish football coach and former player. He was born in Belfast and played for Stockport County, although he did not play a Football League game for them. In the 1981–82 season, he played two league games for Finn Harps in the League of Ireland.

After retiring from his playing career, Speight coached at West Ham United, Stockport County, Manchester City, Blackburn Rovers and Crewe Alexandra. He holds the UEFA Pro Licence and has worked with prominent international footballers including David Beckham, Steven Gerrard and Joe Cole. He also serves as UK and Ireland director of coaching organization Coerver Coaching & Pro Soccer International Group.
