= Michael Gleeson (hurler) =

Irish hurler and selector

Personal information
- Native name: Mícheál Ó Gliasáin (Irish)
- Born: 1955 (age 70–71) Thurles, County Tipperary, Ireland

Sport
- Sport: Hurling
- Position: Right corner-back
Club
- Years: Club
- 1974-1983: Thurles Sarsfields
Club titles
- Tipperary titles: 1
Inter-county
Years	County	Apps (scores)
1975-1977	Tipperary	1 (0-00)
Inter-county titles
- Munster titles: 0
- All-Irelands: 0
- NHL: 0
- All Stars: 0

Michael Gleeson (born 1955 in Thurles, County Tipperary, Ireland) is an Irish hurling selector and former player. He is a selector with the Tipperary senior hurling team.

Gleeson enjoyed a decade-long playing career at club level with Thurles Sarsfields and at inter-county level with Tipperary. He was a corner-back on the latter team in the 1970s, however, he enjoyed little success as Tipp were in the middle of a sharp decline in fortunes. His inter-county career ended without collecting any silverware.

In retirement from inter-county and club activity, Gleeson became involved in team management. His coaching career began with the Durlas Óg club in Thurles before later serving as manager during a revival in the fortunes of Thurles Sarsfields at underage and adult levels. In November 2010 Gleeson was appointed as a selector on the Tipperary senior inter-county team under the management of Declan Ryan.
