= Austin Jackson =

Austin Jackson may refer to:

- Austin Jackson (baseball) (born 1987), American baseball center fielder
- Austin Jackson (American football) (born 1999), American football offensive tackle
