= Austin White =

Montserratian cricketer (born 1959)

Personal information
- Full name: Austin Ciaz Matthew White
- Born: 14 February 1959 (age 67); Montserrat
- Batting: Right-handed
- Bowling: Right-arm fast-medium

Domestic team information
- Years: Team
- 1978/79–1982/83: Leeward Islands
- 1976–1985: Montserrat

Career statistics
Competition	First-class	List A
Matches	5	8
Runs scored	78	21
Batting average	8.66	7.00
100s/50s	–/–	–/–
Top score	19	17
Balls bowled	548	288
Wickets	5	7
Bowling average	73.40	33.71
5 wickets in innings	–	–
10 wickets in match	–	–
Best bowling	2/63	4/51
Catches/stumpings	2/–	–/–
- Source: Cricinfo, 14 October 2012

Austin Ciaz Matthew White (born 14 February 1959) is a former West Indian cricketer. White was a right-handed batsman who bowled right-arm fast-medium. He was born on Montserrat.

White first played for Montserrat against St Kitts in the 1976 Hesketh Bell Shield. In that same year he made his Youth Test match debut for West Indies Young Cricketers against England Young Cricketers. He followed this match up by making his Youth One Day International debut against the same opposition. He made further appearances for West Indies Young Cricketers in 1978 during their tour of England, making two further Youth Test match appearances and a single Youth One Day International appearance.

In 1979, he made his first-class debut for the Leeward Islands against the Windward Islands. In that same year, he made his List A debut for the team against Barbados in the 1978/79 Geddes Grant/Harrison Line Trophy. In 1980, he made a single List A appearance for the Leeward Islands against Guyana, before following this up the following year with a single first-class appearance against a touring England XI. In that same year, he made two List A appearances against Jamaica and Trinidad and Tobago in the 1980/81 Geddes Grant/Harrison Line Trophy. In 1982, he made a single first-class appearance in the 1981/82 Shell Shield against Trinidad and Tobago, as well as making two List A appearances in that seasons Geddes Grant/Harrison Line Trophy against Trinidad and Tobago and Barbados. He made two final first-class appearances for the Leeward Islands in 1983 against Barbados and the touring Indians, as well as two further List A appearances against Barbados and Guyana. In four first-class matches, he scored a total of 78 runs at an average of 8.66, with a high score of 19. With the ball, he took 5 wickets at a bowling average of 73.40, with best figures of 2/63. In List A cricket, he made eight appearances, scoring 21 runs at an average of 7.00, with a high score of 17. With the ball, he took 4 wickets at a bowling average of 33.71, with best figures of 4/51.

He continued to play minor matches for Montserrat during the four-year period in which he played for the Leeward Islands. He continued to play for Montserrat until 1985, with his final recorded match for his home island coming against St Kitts in the 1985 Nissan Leeward Islands Tournament.
