= Austin Parsons =

Scottish cricketer (born 1949)

Personal information
- Full name: Austin Edward Werring Parsons
- Born: 9 January 1949 (age 77); Glasgow, Scotland
- Batting: Right-handed
- Bowling: Right-arm leg-spin

Domestic team information
- Years: Team
- 1973/74–1982/83: Auckland
- 1974–1975: Sussex

Career statistics
Competition	First-class	List A
Matches	82	47
Runs scored	3,847	765
Batting average	26.34	18.21
100s/50s	4/19	0/3
Top score	141	91
Balls bowled	318	–
Wickets	2	–
Bowling average	91.50	–
5 wickets in innings	0	–
10 wickets in match	0	–
Best bowling	1/26	–
Catches/stumpings	44/–	10/–
- Source: Cricinfo, 9 October 2015

Austin Edward Werring Parsons (born 9 January 1949) is a Scottish-born former cricketer who played for Auckland and Sussex.
