= Austin Brady =

Irish footballer

Personal information
- Date of birth: 17 April 1955 (age 71)
- Place of birth: Dublin, Ireland
- Position: Left back

Senior career*
Years	Team	Apps	(Gls)
1976–1982	Bohemians	93	(0)
1982–1987	St. Patrick's Athletic	112	(2)
1987–1990	Athlone Town		
1990–1991	Drogheda United		
1991–1992	Monaghan United		
- * Club domestic league appearances and goals

Austin Brady (born 17 April 1955) is an Irish former association football player, who competed from the 1970s to the 1990s.

== Career ==
Brady played as a defender for Bohemians, amongst others, during his career in the League of Ireland. He made 7 appearances for Bohemians in European competition. He also won amateur international caps for Ireland.

In May 1987, Brady had his testimonial at Richmond Park.
