= William Meldon =

Irish cricketer (1879–1957)

Cricket information
- Batting: Right-handed
- Bowling: Right-arm fast-medium

International information
- National side: Ireland

Career statistics
Competition	First-class
Matches	8
Runs scored	208
Batting average	16.00
100s/50s	0/0
Top score	44
Balls bowled	692
Wickets	14
Bowling average	24.14
5 wickets in innings	1
10 wickets in match	0
Best bowling	5/53
Catches/stumpings	4/–
- Source: CricketArchive, 6 December 2022

William Waltrude "Budge" Meldon (9 April 1879 – 23 May 1957) was an Irish cricketer. He was a right-handed batsman and a right-arm fast-medium bowler.

He started his cricket career playing county cricket with Warwickshire, for whom he played five first-class matches between 1909 and 1910. He then played three first-class matches for Ireland against Scotland between 1911 and 1914, which are his only games for Ireland. He also played minor counties cricket for Northumberland and Devon.
