= Austin Loughnan =

Australian sportsman

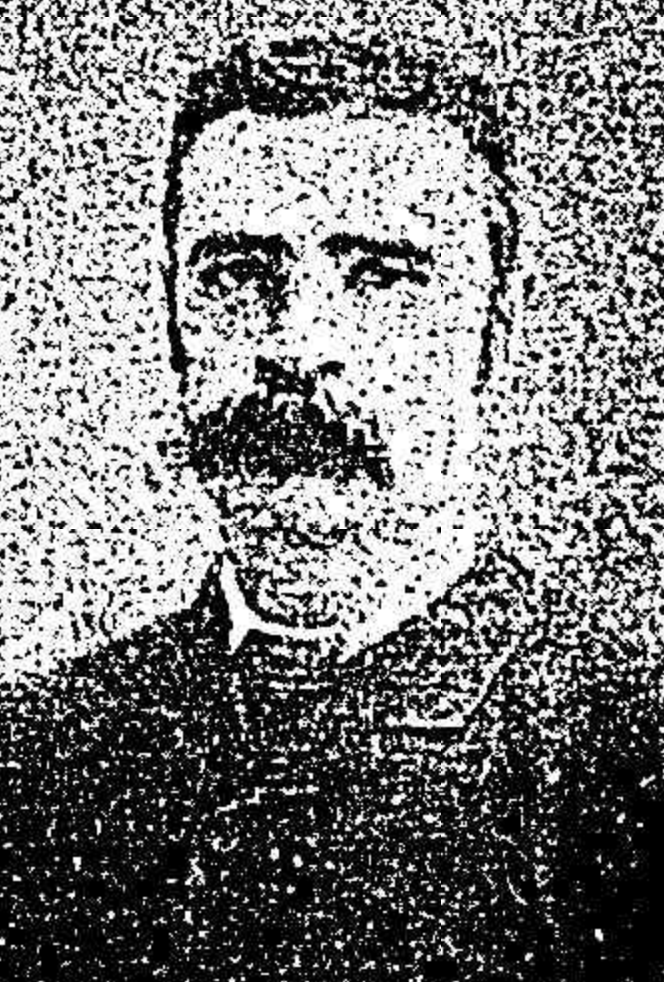

Personal information
- Full name: Austin Robert Loughnan
- Born: 11 June 1851; Hobart, Van Diemen's Land
- Died: 9 October 1926 (aged 75); Cheltenham, Victoria, Australia
- Batting: Right-handed
- Bowling: Right-arm medium to fast pace

Domestic team information
- Years: Team
- 1870/71–1874/75: Victoria
- First-class debut: 24 February 1871 Victoria v Tasmania
- Last First-class: 5 March 1875 Victoria v New South Wales

Career statistics
| Competition | FC |
|---|---|
| Matches | 5 |
| Runs scored | 110 |
| Batting average | 15.71 |
| 100s/50s | 0/0 |
| Top score | 36 |
| Balls bowled | 6 |
| Wickets | 0 |
| Bowling average | – |
| 5 wickets in innings | 0 |
| 10 wickets in match | 0 |
| Best bowling | 0–2 |
| Catches/stumpings | 0/– |
- Source: Cricinfo, 3 May 2015

Austin Robert Loughnan (15 June 1851 – 9 October 1926) was an Australian sportsman who played five first-class cricket matches for Victoria between 1871 and 1875 and played Australian rules football for Melbourne Football Club in the Victorian Football Association (VFA).

== See also ==
- List of Victoria first-class cricketers
