= Charles Clarke (Surrey cricketer) =

English cricketer

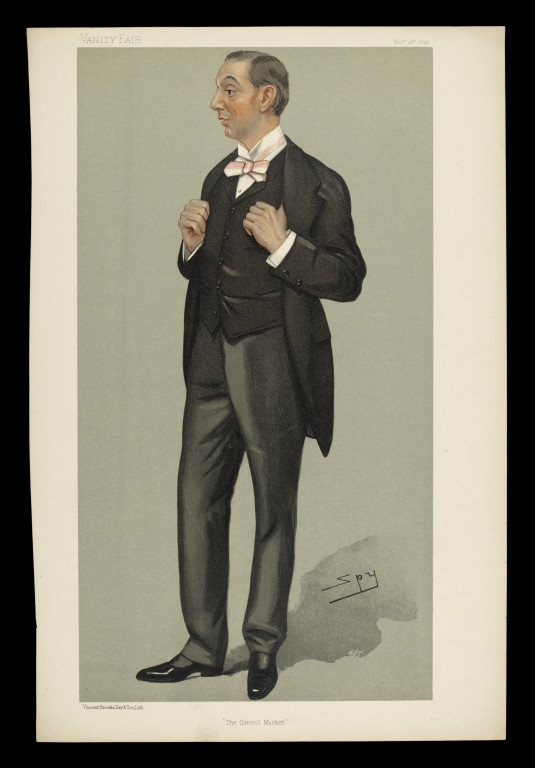
Charles Clarke

Charles Frederick Carlos Clarke (26 April 1853 – 29 January 1931) was an English first-class cricketer active 1873–90 who played for Surrey. He was born in Welton, Northamptonshire and died in Virginia Water.
