= Austin Robertson =

Austin Robertson may refer to:

- Austin Robertson Sr. (1907–1988), Australian rules footballer, father of Austin, Jr.
- Austin Robertson Jr. (1943–2023), Australian rules footballer, son of Austin, Sr.
