= Philip Meldon =

Irish cricketer and Major

International information
- National side: Ireland

Career statistics
Competition	First-class
Matches	2
Runs scored	14
Batting average	4.66
100s/50s	0/0
Top score	7
Balls bowled	84
Wickets	3
Bowling average	27.66
5 wickets in innings	0
10 wickets in match	0
Best bowling	2/83
Catches/stumpings	1/–
- Source: CricketArchive, 6 December 2022

Major Philip Albert Meldon DSO (18 December 1874 – 8 April 1942) was an Irish cricketer and a British Army officer in more than one war.

== Biography ==
He was born in Dublin, Ireland, the eldest son of Sir Albert Meldon. He was commissioned as a second lieutenant in the Royal Field Artillery on 28 March 1900, and was promoted to lieutenant on 3 April 1901. From 1900 to 1902, he served with the 53rd Battery in South Africa during the Second Boer War, and took part in the operations in the Transvaal, east of Pretoria, including engagements at Belfast and Lydenburg. He was wounded and return to the United Kingdom on board the SS Simla in May 1902. He was awarded a DSO in World War I.

In World War II, Meldon was on Special Employment Foreign Office, in 1940. He was held as a German prisoner from 1 April 1940. He died in London reportedly aged 68, on 8 April 1942.

== Cricket and football ==
Meldon played twice for the Irish cricket team; against I Zingari in August 1899 and against H. D. G. Leveson-Gower's XI in 1905. He later played two first-class matches for the MCC in 1911, against Leicestershire and Cambridge University.

Meldon also represented Ireland at football, playing in two international matches in 1899.

== Family ==
Meldon married in 1925 Albreda Bewicke-Copley.
