= George Meldon (cricketer, born 1875) =

Irish cricketer (1875–1950)

Cricket information
- Batting: Right-handed

International information
- National side: Ireland

Career statistics
Competition	First-class
Matches	4
Runs scored	93
Batting average	15.50
100s/50s	0/0
Top score	33
Catches/stumpings	2/–
- Source: CricketArchive, 6 December 2022

George Edward (or Edgar) Pugin Meldon (12 September 1875 – 2 July 1950) was an Irish cricketer. He was a right-handed batsman who played four first-class matches for Dublin University in 1895.

His father was physician Austin Meldon. He was appointed surgeon to the Westmoreland Lock Hospital, Dublin in 1904; anaesthetist, Royal City of Dublin Hospital, in 1909; and anaesthetist, Incorporated Dental Hospital of Ireland, in 1909.

He died at his home, Dunluce, in Anglesea Road, Dublin on 2 July 1950 and was interred in Glasnevin Cemetery on 4 July 1950, after a Solemn Requiem Mass and funeral conducted by Father A. Camac in the Church of the Sacred Heart, Donnybrook. He was survived by three daughters, two sons, and a daughter-in-law.
