= George Bird (cricketer) =

English cricketer

George Bird (30 July 1849 – 28 October 1930) was an English cricketer with amateur status who was active from 1872 to 1880. He was born in Hornsey, Middlesex and died in Esher, Surrey. He made his first-class debut in 1872 and appeared in 21 matches as a right-handed batsman who kept wicket, playing for Middlesex, Marylebone Cricket Club (MCC) and Lancashire, as well as for some all-amateur elevens. He scored 447 runs with a highest score of 75 and held six catches with five stumpings.
