= George Meldon (cricketer, born 1885) =

Irish cricketer (1885–1951)

Cricket information
- Batting: Right-handed

International information
- National side: Ireland

Career statistics
Competition	First-class
Matches	10
Runs scored	263
Batting average	14.61
100s/50s	0/0
Top score	41
Catches/stumpings	4/–
- Source: CricketArchive, 6 December 2022

George James Meldon (18 January 1885 – 27 November 1951) was an Irish cricketer. He was a right-handed batsman.

He made his debut for Ireland against Cambridge University in July 1904, and went on to play for them twelve times, his last game coming in August 1912 against Scotland. Nine of his Ireland games had first-class status, and he also played one first-class match for Woodbrook Club and Ground against South Africa in 1912.
