= Gotch =

Gotch is a surname. Notable people with the surname include:

- Brad Gotch (born 1962), Australian rules footballer
- Francis Gotch (1853–1913), British neurophysiologist
- Frank Gotch (1878–1917), American professional wrestler
- Frank Gotch (physician) (born 1926), American physician
- John Alfred Gotch (1852–1942), British architect and architectural historian
- Karl Gotch (1924–2007), German professional wrestler
- Rosamund Brunel Gotch (1864–1949), English costume designer, illustrator and writer
- Simon Gotch, American professional wrestler
- Tarquin Gotch, British entertainment professional
- Thomas Cooper Gotch (1854–1931), English Pre-Raphaelite artist
- Veronica Gotch, violist with the Whinyates String Quartet in the 1930s and early 1940s

== See also ==
- Gotcher, another surname
- Masafumi Gotoh (born 1976), Japanese musician with stage name Gotch.
- List of English words of Ukrainian origin
