= Arthur Jackson =

Arthur Jackson may refer to:

== People ==
- Arthur Jackson (minister) (1593–1666), English clergyman
- Arthur Herbert Jackson (1851–1881), English composer
- Arthur Jackson (Irish politician) (1853–1938), Irish independent politician
- A. M. T. Jackson (1866–1909), British officer
- Arthur Jackson (cricketer) (1872–1935), Australian cricketer
- Arthur Jackson (Australian politician) (1874–1957), English-born Australian politician
- Arthur Jackson (British sport shooter) (1877–1960), British Olympic sport shooter
- Art Jackson (1915–1971), ice hockey player
- Arthur Jackson (American sport shooter) (1918–2015), American Olympic bronze medal-winning sport shooter
- Arthur J. Jackson (1924–2017), United States Marine Corps officer, Medal of Honor recipient
- Arthur Richard Jackson (1935–2004), who became the subject of a stalking incident to actress Theresa Saldana

== Characters ==
- Arthur 'Two Sheds' Jackson, a character in a Monty Python sketch
