= 1952 in Ireland =

- Centuries: 18th; 19th; 20th; 21st
- Decades: 1930s; 1940s; 1950s; 1960s; 1970s
- See also: 1952 in Northern Ireland; Other events of 1952; List of years in Ireland

Events from the year 1952 in Ireland.

== Incumbents ==
- President: Seán T. O'Kelly
- Taoiseach: Éamon de Valera (FF)
- Tánaiste: Seán Lemass (FF)
- Minister for Finance: Seán MacEntee (FF)
- Chief Justice: Conor Maguire
- Dáil: 14th
- Seanad: 7th

== Events ==
- 10 January – An Aer Lingus Douglas DC-3 aircraft on a London–Dublin flight crashed in Wales due to vertical draft in the mountains of Snowdonia, killing twenty passengers and the three crew. It was the airline's first fatal crash in its fifteen-year history.
- 30 April – The Adoption Bill made provision for the adoption of orphans and children aged between six months and seven years born outside wedlock.
- 11 May – In Washington, D.C., the House Foreign affairs Committee explained that Ireland's exclusion from Marshall Aid was due to its wartime neutrality.
- 30 May – The Minister for Education, Seán Moylan, announced longer summer holidays for national school children.
- 10 June – In the 1952 presidential election, Ireland's third president, Seán T. O'Kelly, was re-elected unopposed for a second term. He was inaugurated on 25 June.
- 24 November – The Minister for Defence, Oscar Traynor, presented framed copies of the Proclamation of the Irish Republic to three printers who had been involved in the production of the original work.
- 29 December – Éamon de Valera arrived back in Dublin after spending four months at an eye clinic in Utrecht in the Netherlands.

== Arts and literature ==
- 12 July – Première of the romantic comedy-drama film The Quiet Man, directed by John Ford and starring John Wayne and Maureen O'Hara, set in 1930s Ireland and with much location filming around Cong, County Mayo.
- 17 October – Samuel Beckett's play Waiting For Godot was published in French as En attendant Godot by Les Éditions de Minuit in Paris.
- The novelist Elizabeth Bowen settled in her ancestral home, Bowen's Court at Farahy, near Kildorrery, County Cork.
- Austin Clarke published his third and last novel The Sun Dances at Easter: a romance; like the first two, it was prohibited in Ireland by the Censorship of Publications Board.
- Louis le Brocquy's 1951 painting A Family sparked controversy when a group of art patrons offered to present it to the Dublin Municipal Gallery and it was rejected by the Art Advisory Committee on the grounds of incompetence.
- Daniel O'Neill painted Birth.
- Seán Ó Ríordáin published his first book of poetry, Eireaball Spideoige.

== Sport ==
=== Association football ===
League of Ireland
Winners: St Patrick's Athletic

FAI Cup
Winners: Dundalk 1–1, 3–0 Cork Athletic.

=== Golf ===
- Irish Open – no tournament held.

== Births ==
- 8 January – Peter Sheridan, playwright, screenwriter, director and author.
- 30 January – Anne Doyle, newsreader.
- 2 February – Brian Murphy, Cork Gaelic footballer and hurler.
- 10 February – Martin Ferris, Provisional IRA member, Sinn Féin Teachta Dála (TD) for Kerry North.
- 24 February – Tony Allen, musician
- 25 February – Seánie O'Leary, Cork hurler (died 2021).
- 3 March – Dermot Morgan, actor and comedian (died 1998).
- 18 March – Pat Eddery, flat racing jockey (died 2015).
- 26 March – Martin O'Doherty, Cork hurler.
- 29 March – John Gilligan, drug smuggler implicated in the murder of Veronica Guerin.
- 14 April – Mickey O'Sullivan, Kerry Gaelic footballer, Limerick manager.
- 28 April – Gerald Barry, composer.
- April – Paul Coulson, entrepreneur.
- 2 May
  - Pat Buckley, priest (died 2024).
  - John Ellis, Fianna Fáil TD, Senator.
- 12 May – Pat Hooper, long-distance runner.
- 14 May – Tim Crowley, Cork hurler.
- 19 May – Bibi Baskin, television presenter.
- 9 June – Tony Killeen, Fianna Fáil TD for Clare, Minister of State.
- 27 June – Ger Power, Kerry Gaelic footballer.
- July – Anne Anderson, 17th Ambassador of Ireland to the United States, first woman to hold the post.
- 11 July – Tom Kitt, Fianna Fáil TD for Dublin South, Government Chief Whip.
- 4 August – Moya Brennan, singer.
- 5 August – Louis Walsh, manager in the music industry, judge on The X Factor.
- 7 August – Eamonn Darcy, golfer.
- 9 August – Dinny Allen, Cork Gaelic footballer.
- 25 August – Martin Duffy, filmmaker and writer.
- 11 September – Jimmy Deenihan, Fine Gael TD for Kerry North.
- 27 September – Liam Aylward, Fianna Fáil TD, Member of the European Parliament representing East.
- 6 October – Matthew Sweeney, poet (died 2018).
- 7 October – Mícheál Ó Domhnaill, folk and traditional musician (died 2006).
- 22 October – Mick Fairclough, association football player.
- 1 November – Willie O'Dea, barrister-at-law, lecturer, Fianna Fáil TD representing Limerick East, Cabinet Minister.
- 8 November – Felim Egan, painter (died 2020).
- 21 November – Eamonn Coghlan, four-time Olympian and world championship winning runner.
- 28 November – Pat Cox, Progressive Democrats TD, Member of the European Parliament representing Munster, fifth President of the European Parliament and television presenter.
- 14 December – Noel Synnott, association football player and manager.
  Full date unknown

- Harry Clifton, poet.
- John MacKenna, playwright and novelist.
- Shelley McNamara, architect.
- Michael Mulcahy, painter.
- Maurice Scully, poet and editor (died 2023).

== Deaths ==
- 6 February – King George VI of the United Kingdom of Great Britain and Northern Ireland (born 1895).
- 18 February – Ernest Alton, university professor, represented Dublin University in the Dáil from 1921 to 1927, represented Dublin University in the Seanad from 1938 to 1943 (born 1873).
- 27 February – Helena Concannon, Fianna Fáil politician and historian (born 1878).
- 21 March – James Perry Goodbody, nominated to the 1922 Seanad and the 1925 Seanad by the President of the Executive Council (born 1877).
- 9 May – P. J. Ruttledge, Sinn Féin, then Fianna Fáil, TD and cabinet minister (born 1892).
- 23 October – Windham Wyndham-Quin, peer and politician (born 1857).
- 2 November – Maire O'Neill, actress (born 1885).
- 22 November – John Joe O'Reilly, Cavan Gaelic footballer (born 1919).
