= Peace Commissioner =

Irish honorary position

Peace Commissioner (Irish: Coimisinéir Síochána) is an honorary position in Ireland with special powers to make statutory declarations and witness signatures on documents under various Acts of the Oireachtas.

== Role ==
The Courts of Justice Act 1924 gives Peace Commissioners the power to issue summons and warrants. The title, first proposed as "Parish Commissioner", replaced Justice of the Peace, which was regarded as too reminiscent of British titles. Senator Edmund Eyre proposed the change from "parish" to "peace" since their jurisdiction was a county rather than a parish, and "a Parish Commissioner, somehow, sounds of the days of Oliver Twist".

Peace Commissioners are primarily used to issue summons and search warrants to the Gardaí, witness signatures on documents, take statutory declarations and sign certificates and orders. However, they cannot sign and authenticate affidavits. A Peace Commissioner should not sign any document in which they have an "interest", meaning they should not sign documents for members of their own family or people with whom they work. This is to ensure that a Peace Commissioner remains an unbiased witness.

In 2012, there were 5,733 Peace Commissioners operating throughout the country.

As of May 2024 there were 4,500 Peace Commissioners with an additional 300 serving in an ex-officio capacity.

== Appointment ==
The Office of Peace Commissioner is a discretionary appointment by the Minister for Justice, Home Affairs and Migration, a member of the Government.

There is no special application form. An application for appointment may be made by an individual on their own behalf, or a nomination for appointment may be made by a third party. Nominations are generally received from public representatives, and a Garda superintendent may sometimes request an appointment in their district as the need arises. Nominations for appointment to the Office of Peace Commissioner apply to the Minister for Justice with the reason for their application or nomination and provide some background information about the individual proposed for appointment.

There is no qualifying examination, but appointees are required to be of good character and are usually well-established in the local community. People convicted of serious offenses are considered unsuitable. Civil servants are generally appointed only when the performance of their official duties requires an appointment. Solicitors, people employed in legal offices, and members of the clergy are, as a matter of practice, not appointed because their occupation may cause a conflict of interest. The fact that an applicant or nominee may be suitable for appointment does not, in itself, provide any entitlement to appointment because other factors, such as the need for appointments in particular areas, are considered.

== Stamp of Office ==
Unlike Solicitors and Commissioners for Oaths, a stamp is not required by the Minister for Justice, but, in practice, many Peace Commissioners use a personal stamp as agencies often reject stamp-less documents. When booking a Peace Commissioner, it is advisable to ask if they have a rubber stamp.

== Register ==
The Department of Justice maintains a list of peace commissioners. However, this list is not available online. The Department will usually provide the name and address of a peace commissioner on request. Local Garda stations, which use the services of a Peace Commissioner in their daily duties, are usually in a position to provide the name and address of a Peace Commissioner in a particular area.

It is customary for Peace Commissioners to use the Post-nominal "PC" after their name to make themselves known when requested by the Garda and members of the public to discharge their duties.

== Costs and rates ==
As an honorary government appointment, Peace Commissioners are forbidden to charge for their services. Whereas, Notaries and Commissioner are professional roles and do charge fees.
