= Bone hemostasis =

Process of controlling bleeding from bone

Bone hemostasis is the process of controlling the bleeding from bone.

Bone is a living vascular organ containing channels for blood and bone marrow. When a bone is cut during surgery bleeding can be a difficult problem to control, especially in the highly vascular bones of the spine and sternum. Bleeding from soft tissue is normally stopped using a cautery that creates heat, causing blood vessels to collapse and become sealed. Since the blood in living bone flows through channels in the bone that do not collapse, a cautery is not effective in preventing bone bleeding. Blocking the holes in the bone typically stops bone bleeding. This can be done by mechanically blocking the holes (tamponade effect), or by inducing a blood clot to form.

In the past the easiest and most common way to stop bone bleeding was to apply bone wax, which is made from beeswax. The bone wax is smeared across the bleeding edge of the bone, blocking the holes and causing immediate hemostasis. Because of the complications associated with the use of bone wax, newer absorbable and resorbable hemostatic agents have been developed. These include firm waxes derived from alkylene oxide copolymers as well as ready use resorbable putties.
