= Senator Jackson =

Senator Jackson may refer to:

== Ireland ==
Seanad Éireann (Irish Free State):

- Arthur Jackson (Irish politician) (1853–1938), independent member from 1922 to 1928

== Mexico ==
Senate of the Republic:

- Enrique Jackson (1945–2021), Senator-at-Large from 2000 to 2006

== United States ==
United States Senate:

- Andrew Jackson (1767–1845), U.S. Senator from Tennessee from 1797 to 1798 and from 1823 to 1825
- Henry M. Jackson (1912–1983), U.S. Senator from Washington from 1953 to 1983
- Howell E. Jackson (1832–1895), U.S. Senator from Tennessee from 1881 to 1886
- James Jackson (Georgia politician) (1757–1806), U.S. Senator from Georgia from 1793 to 1795 and from 1801 to 1806
- Jesse Jackson (1941–2026), shadow U.S. Senator for the District of Columbia from 1991 to 1997
- Samuel D. Jackson (1895–1951), U.S. Senator from Indiana in 1944
- Troy Jackson (born 1968), U.S. Senator-elect from Maine
- William P. Jackson (1868–1939), U.S. Senator from Maryland from 1912 to 1914

State senates:

- Alvin B. Jackson (fl. 2000s–2010s), Utah State Senate
- Bill Jackson (politician) (born 1932), Georgia State Senate
- Claiborne Fox Jackson (1806–1862), Missouri State Senate
- Clingan Jackson (1907–1997), Ohio State Senate
- Darrell Jackson (politician) (born 1957), South Carolina State Senate
- Douglas S. Jackson (born 1954), Tennessee State Senate
- Ed Jackson (Tennessee politician) (born 1948), Tennessee State Senate
- Gary Jackson (politician) (born 1950), Mississippi State Senate
- George Jackson (Virginia politician) (1757–1831), Virginia State Senate
- Hancock Lee Jackson (1796–1876), Missouri State Senate
- Henry M. Jackson (1912–1983), Washington State Senate
- Jack Jackson Jr. (fl. 2000s–2010s), Arizona State Senate
- Jack Jackson Sr. (born 1933), Arizona State Senate
- Jeff Jackson (politician) (born 1980s), North Carolina State Senate
- Jonathan Jackson (Massachusetts politician) (1743–1810), Massachusetts State Senate
- Joseph Webber Jackson (1796–1854), Georgia State Senate
- Lester Jackson (fl. 1990s–2000s), Georgia State Senate
- Lloyd G. Jackson (1918–2011), West Virginia State Senate
- Lydia P. Jackson (born 1960), Louisiana State Senate
- Mike Jackson (Texas politician) (born 1953), Texas State Senate
- Morris Jackson (1918–2004), Ohio State Senate
- Sampson Jackson (born 1953), Mississippi State Senate
- Verdell Jackson (born 1941), Montana State Senate
- W. Brent Jackson (born 1957), North Carolina State Senate
