= Charles Lucas (musician) =

English composer, cellist and Principal of the Royal Academy of Music (1808–1869)

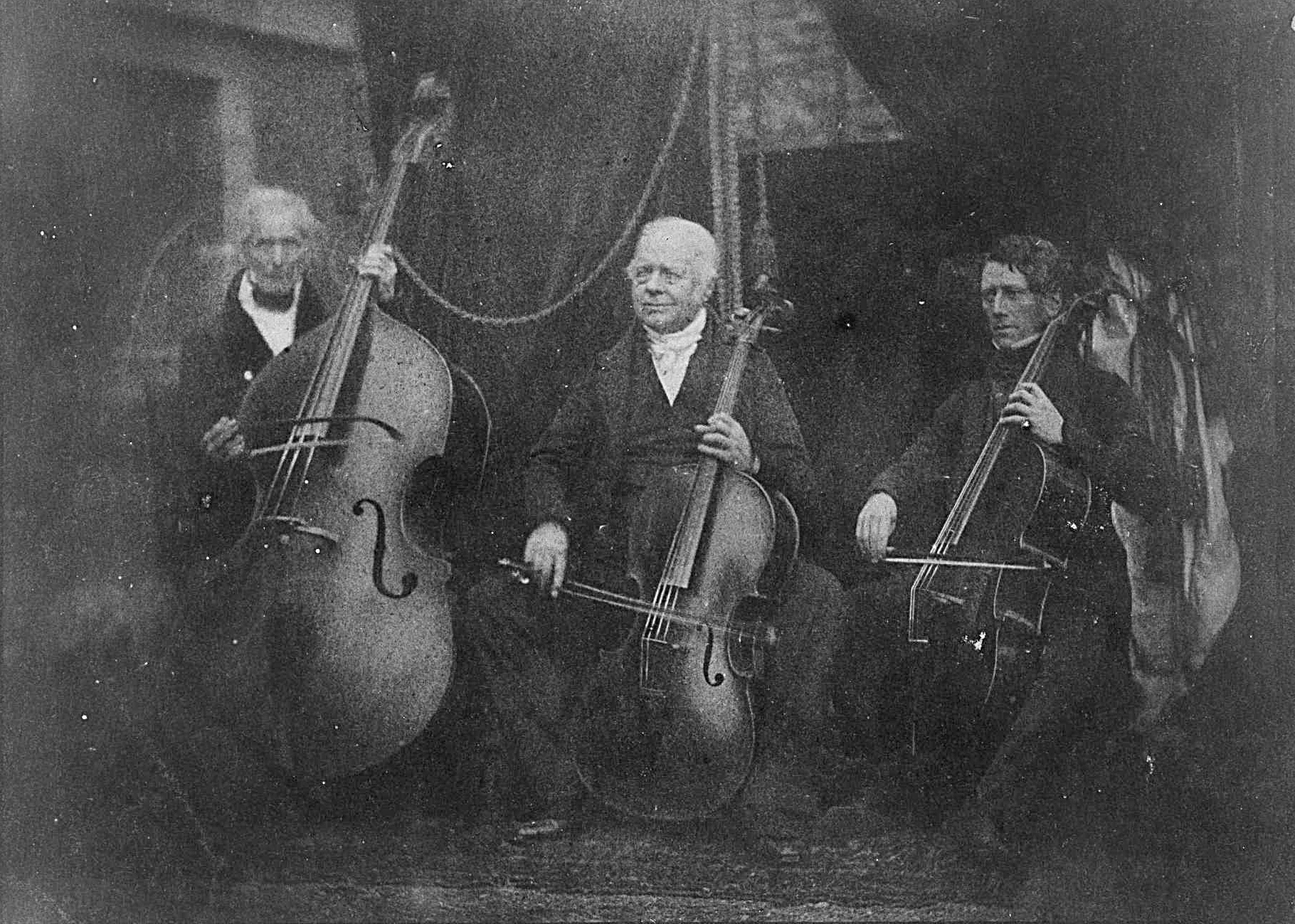
- Lucas (right, unconfirmed), with Domenico Dragonetti (left) and Robert Lindley in 1841

Background information
- Born: 28 July 1808; Salisbury, England
- Died: 23 March 1869 (aged 60) Wandsworth, London, England
- Occupations: composer, cellist, conductor, publisher
- Instrument: Cello
- Years active: 1815–1866

Charles Lucas (28 July 1808 – 23 March 1869) was an English composer, cellist, conductor, publisher and from 1859 to 1866 third principal of the Royal Academy of Music.

== Life and career ==
Lucas was born in Salisbury, the son of a music-seller. After receiving a musical education as a chorister at Salisbury Cathedral between 1815 and 1823 he attended the newly formed Royal Academy of Music (RAM) in London, where he studied the cello under Robert Lindley and composition under the principal, William Crotch. While a student he won several prizes, became head boy and was made a sub-professor of composition in 1824. Among those he taught was William Sterndale Bennett, who four decades later succeeded him as principal of the academy. In later years Lucas taught two other musicians who eventually headed the RAM: George Macfarren and Alexander Mackenzie. The latter recalled that Lucas had been an outstanding teacher of counterpoint.

After leaving the academy in 1830 Lucas was appointed to Queen Adelaide's private band, and became music tutor to Prince George (later Duke) of Cambridge and the princes of Saxe-Weimar. He performed in London orchestras, eventually succeeding Lindley as the leading cellist at Covent Garden and other ensembles. He was devoted to chamber music, and participated in the British premieres of chamber works including Beethoven's late string quartets.

In 1832 Cipriani Potter, conductor of the orchestra at the RAM, succeeded Crotch as principal; Lucas was appointed to the post vacated by Potter. In this capacity he directed two performances of Beethoven's Symphony No 9 in 1835 and 1836. The Times praised the performances and hoped that the academy's efforts would spur the Philharmonic Society into presenting the work at its concerts. Lucas later conducted for the society and other concert promoters. He served as a director of the society from 1856 to 1869, during Bennett's term as conductor of its orchestra.

In his history of the RAM (1922) Frederick Corder wrote: "In July [1858] Cipriani Potter resigned, on the plea of old age and infirmity. He was a good and conscientious man rather than an able one, loved by his subordinates, the best of whom, Charles Lucas – who had served him faithfully and earnestly begged him not to retire – was elected Principal in his place." Corder commented that Lucas

....may be said to have been Potter's favourite pupil, and was certainly devoted to his master", and that Lucas's career "was one of unobtrusive usefulness, never of distinction. ... [H]is appointment to the principalship of the Royal Academy was, to put it bluntly, a mere job. The position ... was not one to attract any outsider of independent mind; the pay was small and the opportunity for self-advertisement almost nil; but Lucas knew Potter's work and carried it on.

The finances of the academy had been precarious from its inception, and did not improve during Lucas's seven years in office. His successor, Bennett, had to rescue the institution from imminent dissolution. On the musical side, Corder describes Lucas's tenure as the least interesting period in the RAM's history, but Lucas was well regarded to the extent that a fund was set up in his honour to endow an annual "Charles Lucas Medal", given to the RAM student judged to have written the best musical composition. Among its recipients have been Arnold Bax, Richard Rodney Bennett, Dora Bright, Guirne Creith, Edward German, Arthur Thomas, Joseph Holbrooke, Emma Lomax and Stewart Macpherson.

With Robert Addison and John Hollier, Lucas was a partner in the music publishing firm Addison, Hollier and Lucas, which flourished between 1856 and 1863 with its premises at 210 Regent Street, and later at 11 Little Marlborough Street. The firm published most of the operas by Macfarren, Michael Balfe, William Vincent Wallace, and Julius Benedict, business gained through its close association with the Pyne and Harrison Opera Company.

Ill health led Lucas to retire from the RAM in 1866. He died three years later at his home, 9 Louvaine Road, Wandsworth, London, at the age of 60, and is buried in Woking.

== Music ==
Lucas's compositions included three symphonies, overtures, string quartets (including the String Quartet in G major, 1827), anthems and songs. The three Sinfonias, each with four movements, are student works written before he became conductor of the Royal Academy of Music orchestra in 1832. Jürgen Schaarwächter highlights the "lively and charming" minuets of the second and third Sinfonias in the tradition of Haydn and Mozart, and the finale of the third: "a short, spirited conclusion to Lucas's symphonic output, which resembles some of Schubert's earlier symphonies (which were certainly not known to Lucas)".

He also wrote an opera, The Regicide, to a libretto by Metastasio translated by Thomas Oliphant, the overture to which The Times described as "a spirited composition, very noisy and without any great originality". Not long before the composer's death an overture, Rosenwald, was performed by the Philharmonic Society at the Hanover Square Rooms in London on 8 June 1868. The Philharmonic Society performed several other of his works during his lifetime, including the second and third symphonies and the Regicide overture. As editor Lucas prepared a performing version of Esther for the Handel Society.

== Selected compositions ==
- 1826 – Sinfonia No 1 in C (revised 1834)
- 1827 – String Quartet in G major
- 1829 – Sinfonia No 2 in A
- 1830 – Sinfonia No 3 in Bb major
- 1836 – Magnificat, canonic setting for four voices (Gresham Prize, 1836)
- 1840 – The Regicide, opera
- 1868 – Overture Rosenwald

== Charles Lucas Medal ==
The Charles Lucas Prize for composition, founded in his memory, was awarded by the Royal Academy of Music in the form of a silver medal. Recipients included:

- Arthur Herbert Jackson (1875)
- Eaton Faning (1876)
- R. Harvey Löhr (1877–1878)
- Arthur Thomas (1879–1880)
- George John Bennett (1881)
- William G. Wood (1882)
- Frederick Kilvington Hattersley (1883)
- Stewart Macpherson (1884)
- Edward German (1886)
- Arthur E. Godfrey (1886)
- Edward Cuthbert Nunn (1887)
- Dora Bright (1888)
- Ethel Mary Boyce (1889)
- Learmont Drysdale (1890)
- G. F. Wrigley (1891)
- Charles Macpherson (1892)
- Hermann Löhr (1893)
- Llewela Davies (1894)
- John Blackwood McEwen (1895)
- William Henry Reed (1896)
- Joseph Holbrooke (1897)
- Percy Hilder Miles (1898)
- Harry Farjeon (1899)
- G. D. Cunningham (1900)
- Adam Carse (1901)
- York Bowen (1902)
- Benjamin Dale (1903)
- Arnold Bax (1904)
- Hubert Bath (1905)
- Montague Phillips (1906)
- Bertram Walton O'Donnell (1907)
- Eleanor Rudall (1908)
- Sam Hartley Braithwaite (1909)
- Emma Lomax (1910)
- Morton Stephenson (1911)
- Ethel Edith Bilsland (1912)
- Morfydd Llwyn Owen (1913)
- Eric Grant (1914)
- William B. Manson (1915)
- Arthur Sandford (1916)
- Elsie Marian Nye (1917)
- Edmund Jenkins (1918)
- Richard Newton (1919)
- Paul Kerby (1920)
- Peter Latham (1921)
- Michael Head (1922)
- Frederick T. Durrant (1923)
- Madeleine Windsor (1924)
- Guirne Creith (1925)
- Ivor R. Davies (1926)
- Robert O. Edwards (1927)
- Ethel M. Winfield (1928)
- Norman Fulton (1929)
- Barbara M. Bryer (1930)
- Marjorie Corker (1931)
- Monica Myatt (1932)
- Norman Askew (1933)
- Geoffrey Robbins (1934)
- Manuel Frenkel (1936)
- Cecil Dorling (1937)
- Geraldine Mucha (1938)
- Arnold van Wyk (1939)
- Margaret Hubicki (1941)
- David E. Stone (1942)
- Barbara Rawling (1943)
- Peter Hodgson (1946)
- Doreen Carwithen (1947)
- Stephen Rhys (1948)
- Aubrey Hickman (1949)
- Ian Humphris (1951)
- Andrew Byrne (1952)
- Raymond Hockley (1953)
- Richard Rodney Bennett (1954)
- Philip Croot (1958)
- Sven Weber (1960)
- Christopher Steel (1961)
- Martin Jones (1962)

== Sources ==
- Bennett, J. R. Sterndale (1907). A History of the Royal Academy of Music from 1822 to 1922. Cambridge: Cambridge University Press. OCLC 63021710.
- Corder, Frederick (1922). The Life of William Sterndale Bennett. London: Anglo-French Music Company. OCLC 19019505.
- Edwards, Frederic George (1903). "William Sterndale Bennett (1816–1875), Part 2 of 3". The Musical Times. 44 (724): 379–381. doi:10.2307/903249. JSTOR 903249. (subscription required)
- Schaarwächter, Jürgen (2015). Two Centuries of British Symphonism: From the beginnings to 1945, Georg Olms Verlag AG
