= Gotcher =

Gotcher is a surname. Notable people with the surname include:

- Brett Gotcher (born 1984), American long distance runner
- Toddrick Gotcher (born 1993), American basketball player

== See also ==
- Gotch, another surname
