= Guirne Creith =

English composer and pianist (1907–1996)

Guirne Creith (born Gladys Mary Cohen; 21 February 1907, in London – 1996) was an English composer and pianist most active in the 1920s and 1930s. Creith was the eldest daughter of Mr and Mrs George Cohen of Portland Place in London, and the cousin of the industrialist Robert Waley Cohen. She received the Charles Lucas Prize in 1925, having entered the Royal Academy of Music just two years before under the pseudonym Guirne M Creith. As a student at the Academy she studied composition under Benjamin Dale and conducting under Sir Henry Wood. She later studied piano with the Swiss pianist and renowned Bach interpreter Edwin Fischer.

Only after her death did she became known for her Concerto in G minor for Violin and Orchestra, which had been premiered by Albert Sammons, conducted by Constant Lambert, on 19 May 1936. It was revived in 2008 by Lorraine McAslan and the Royal Scottish National Orchestra, conducted by Martin Yates. A recording was issued on the Dutton label. A second recording came out in 2026.

== Works ==
Many of Creith's manuscripts are missing. Her compositions include four orchestral pieces (only the concerto survives), six works of chamber music (though all six of these are lost and known only from descriptions, so their instrumentation is a matter of conjecture; the Ballade might be for orchestra for example), six songs (five of them published between 1929 and 1956, and the other lost - apparently her only published works), and one ballet (also lost). The recently recorded concerto was discovered by family members in full-score manuscript. In all, of these, only her published songs and the violin concerto are known to survive, and the latter only because the manuscript was rediscovered.

BBC broadcast listings and newspaper reviews show that Creith's time in the public spotlight was limited. Her Ballet Suite in Four Movements was broadcast on 8 February 1928, with the composer conducting. The orchestral tone poem May Eve was broadcast on 3 June 1928, and her one movement String Quartet in E minor (although still unpublished) on 28 November 1928, performed by the Stratton String Quartet.

During the 1930s Creith was appearing as a recitalist rather than a composer, though occasionally she would include her own works in the programmes, such as the Violin Sonata in B flat, which she played with Albert Sammons on 27 June 1933 at the Wigmore Hall. The Violin Concerto, written between 1932 and 1934 and performed in a BBC studio broadcast in 1936, was dedicated to Sammons. It has been described as "a full-blown concerto based on the French model, in a style that recalls the later Russian Romantics, such as Glazunov and Arensky."

Creith performed her piano composition A Portrait Gallery in a joint recital with the Russian singer Vladimir Rosing in London in June 1934.

== Later career ==
In 1940, she married Walter Hunter Coddington (1907-1994), by whom she had two sons: Robin (born 1940) and Jeremy (born 1943). They were divorced after a few years. Following an accident in 1952 that resulted in a permanent injury to her right hand, Creith became a singer, studying with Reinhold Gerhardt at the Guildhall School of Music, before turning to teaching (both piano and singing) from her mews flat in Swiss Cottage, Hampstead, London. During this period some songs were published under the name Guirne Javal. Her piano students included the young David Fanshawe.

In later years Creith reinvented herself once again. After a five year spell living in France, she became a French food and wine expert, publishing two books under the name Guirne Van Zuylen: Gourmet Cooking for Everyone (1969, 1975) and Eating with Wine (1972). She also wrote a pamphlet, Beethoven & Wegeler: The Story of a Life Long Friendship for the Beethoven Museum in the 1970s.
