= Victor Horsley =

British physiologist and surgeon (1857–1916)

Sir Victor Horsley FRS FRCS
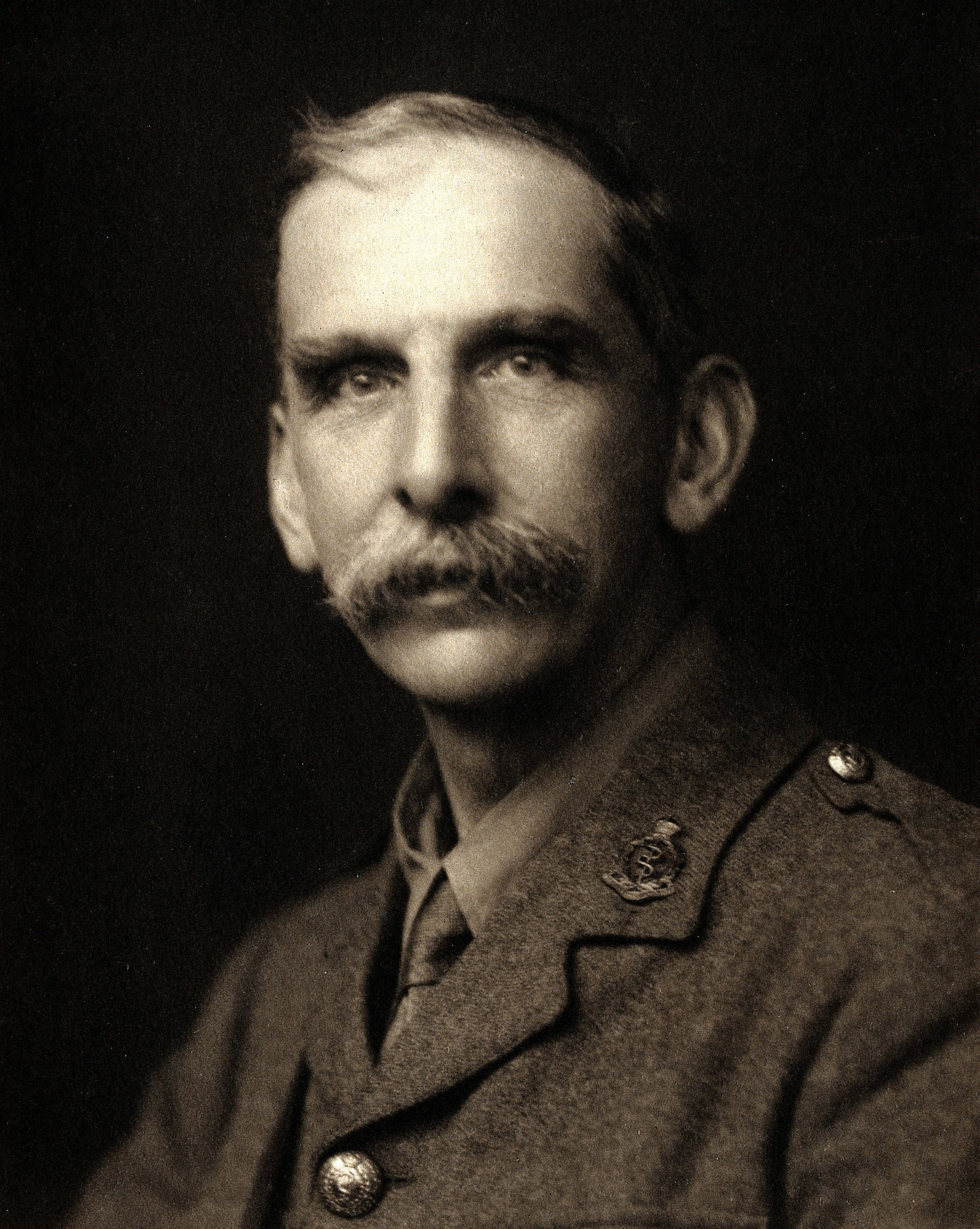
- Born: Victor Alexander Haden Horsley; 14 April 1857; Kensington, London, England
- Died: 16 July 1916 (aged 59); Amarah, Iraq
- Education: Cranbrook School, Kent; University College London
- Known for: Pioneering work in neuroscience
- Medical career
- Profession: Surgeon, physician
- Institutions: University College Hospital; Brown Institute; National Hospital for Paralysis and Epilepsy
- Sub-specialties: Neurosurgery
- Research: Epilepsy myxedema cretinism trigeminal neuralgia
- Awards: Knighthood; Cameron Prize for Therapeutics of the University of Edinburgh (1893); Royal Medal (1894)

Sir Victor Alexander Haden Horsley (14 April 1857 – 16 July 1916) was a British scientist and professor.

He was born in Kensington, London. Educated at Cranbrook School, Kent, he studied medicine at University College London and in Berlin, Germany (1881) and, in the same year, started his career as a house surgeon and registrar at the University College Hospital. From 1884 to 1890, Horsley was Professor-Superintendent of the Brown Institute.

In 1886, he was appointed as Assistant Professor of Surgery at the National Hospital for Paralysis and Epilepsy, and as a Professor of Pathology (1887–1896) and Professor of Clinical Surgery (1899–1902) at University College London. He was a supporter of women's suffrage and was an opponent of tobacco and alcohol.

== Personal life ==
Victor Alexander Haden Horsley was born in Kensington, London, the son of John Callcott Horsley and his second wife Rosamund (Haden), and the brother of Rosamund Brunel Horsley. His given name, Victor Alexander, was given to him by Queen Victoria.

In 1883, he became engaged to Eldred Bramwell, daughter of Sir Frederick Bramwell. On 4 October 1887, Victor and Eldred married at St. Margaret's, Westminster. They had two sons, Siward and Oswald, and a daughter, Pamela.

He was knighted in the 1902 Coronation Honours, receiving the accolade from King Edward VII at Buckingham Palace on 24 October that year.

Horsley was a champion of many causes. One of his primary life crusades was the temperance movement. Having observed that many injuries admitted to the hospital were due to alcohol, Horsley threw himself into becoming a temperance reformer. He soon rose up to the position of vice president of the National Temperance League and the president of the British Medical Temperance Association. In 1907, along with Dr. Mary Sturge, he published a book on alcoholism titled Alcohol and the Human Body.

According to his biographers, Tan & Black (2002), "Horsley's kindness, humility, and generous spirit endeared him to patients, colleagues, and students. Born to privilege, he was nonetheless dedicated to improving the lot of the common man and directed his efforts toward the suffrage of women, medical reform, and free health care for the working class (...) An iconoclast of keen intellect, unlimited energy, and consummate skill, his life and work justifies his epitaph as a "pioneer of neurological surgery".

== Medical career ==
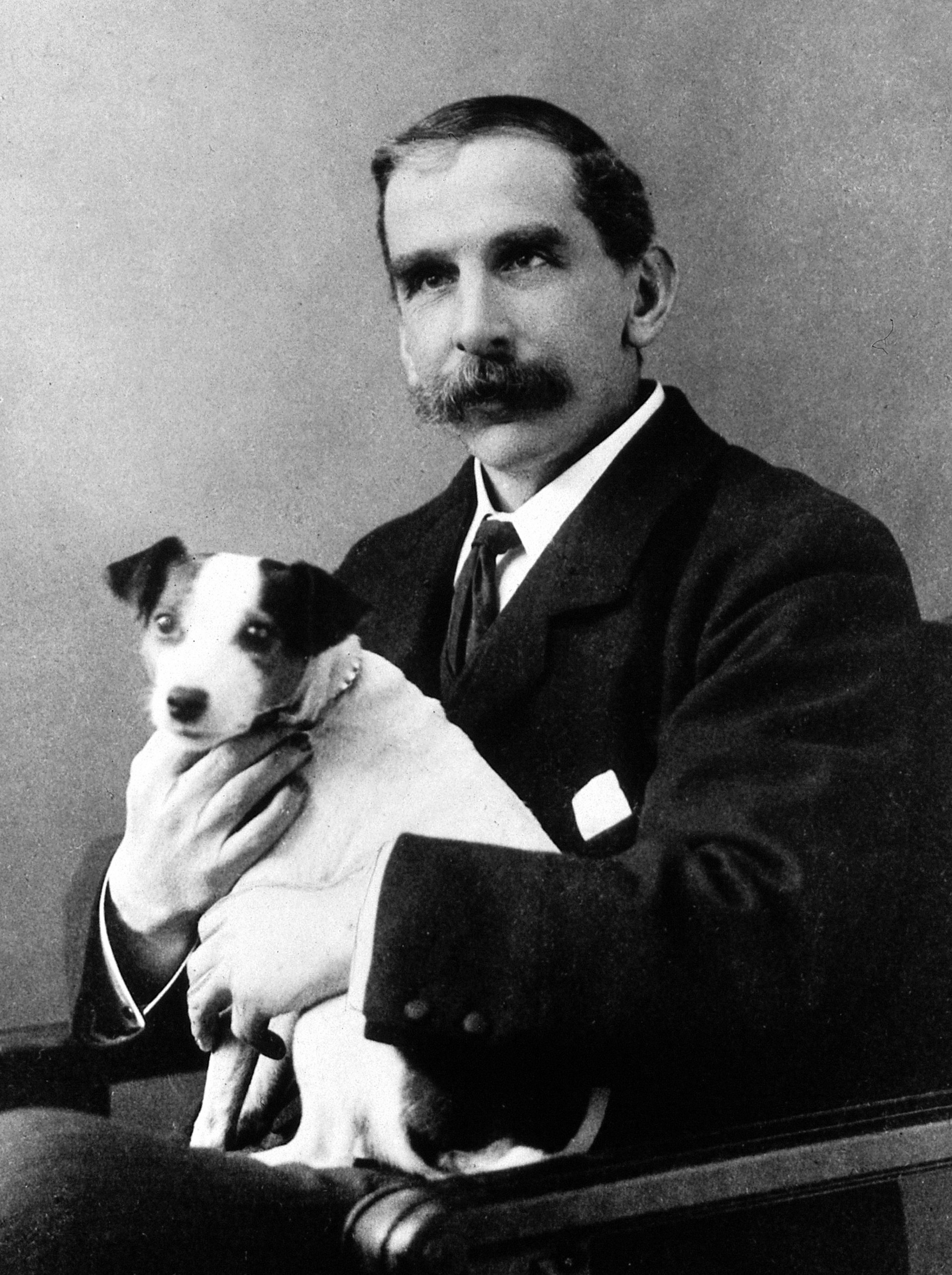
Victor Horsley

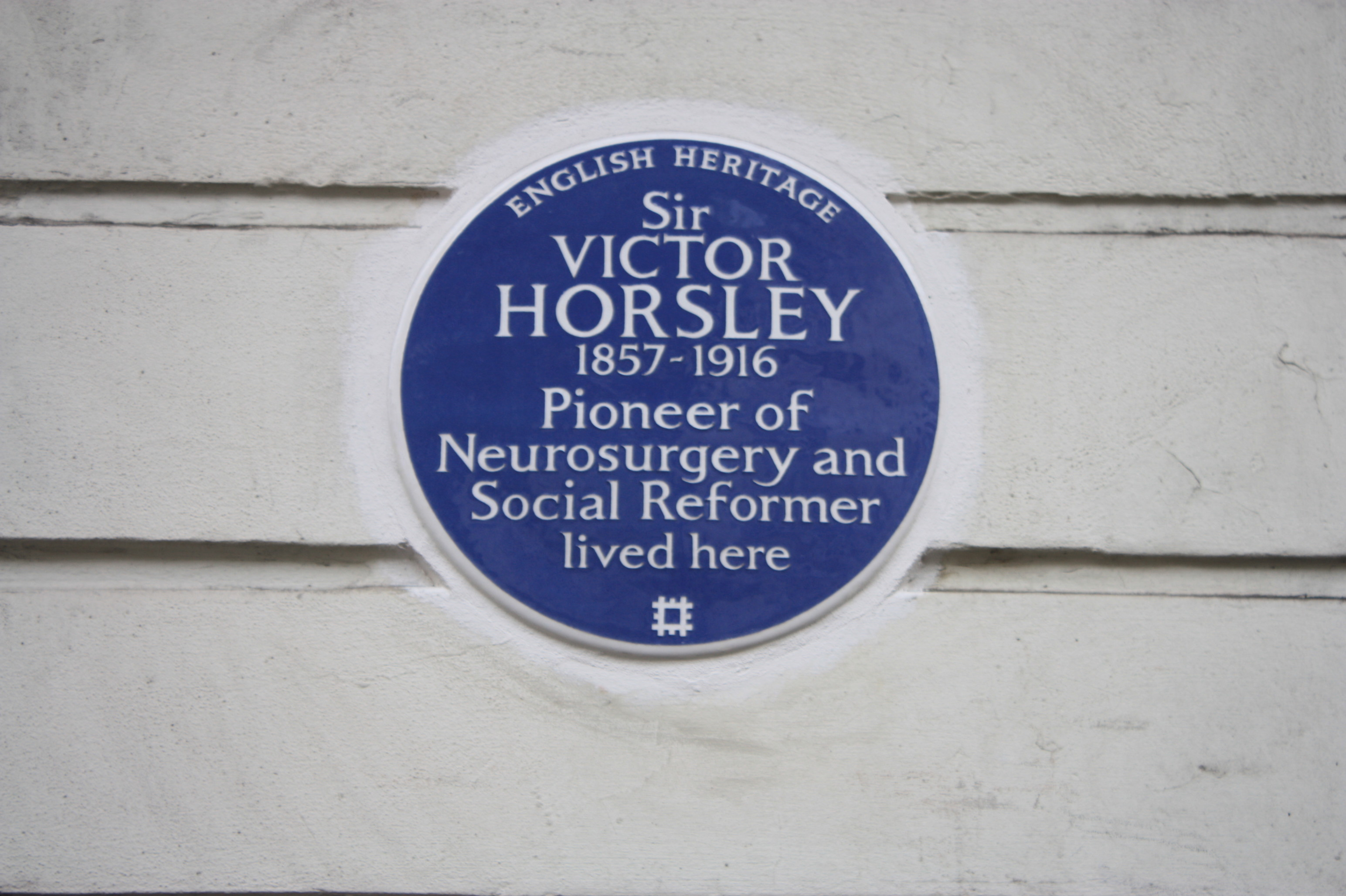
The blue plaque to Victor Horsley on Gower Street in London

Horsley specialised in surgery and in physiology. He was the first physician to remove a spinal tumor, in 1887, by means of a laminectomy. He developed many practical neurosurgical techniques, including the hemostatic bone wax, the skin flap, the ligation of the carotid artery to treat cerebral aneurysms, the transcranial approach to the pituitary gland and the intradural division of the trigeminal nerve root for the surgical treatment of trigeminal neuralgia.

As a neuroscientist, he carried out studies of the functions of the brain in animals and humans, particularly on the cerebral cortex. His studies on motor response to faradic electrical stimulation of the cerebral cortex, internal capsule and spinal cord became classics of the field. Those studies later translated into his pioneering work on neurosurgery for epilepsy. Between 1884 and 1886, Horsley was the first to use intraoperative electrical stimulation of the cortex for the localization of epileptic foci in humans, preceding Fedor Krause and Wilder Penfield.

He was also a pioneer in the study of the functions of the thyroid gland. He studied myxedema and cretinism, which are caused by a decreased level of the thyroid hormones (hypothyroidism), and established for the first time, in experiments with monkeys, that they could be treated with extracts of the gland.

Appointed in 1886 as secretary to a governmental commission formed to study the anti-rabies vaccine developed by Louis Pasteur, Horsley corroborated his results and created a campaign to vaccinate against rabies in the United Kingdom. As a pathologist, he carried out research on bacteria and founded the Journal of Pathology.

In June 1886, he was elected a Fellow of the Royal Society and, in 1891, jointly with his brother-in-law Francis Gotch, delivered their Croonian Lecture on the subject of the mammalian nervous system. In 1893, he was awarded the Cameron Prize for Therapeutics of the University of Edinburgh. A year later, in 1894, he won the Royal Medal for "his investigations relating to the physiology of the nervous system, and of the thyroid gland, and to their applications to the treatment of disease".

Horsley, who had been a keen rifle shot when serving in the Artists' Rifles as a medical student, also investigated the effect of gunshot wounds on the brain, experimenting with animals provided by a butcher and using the recently issued Lee-Metford rifle. He concluded that the immediate cause of death that follows was due to respiratory failure, not heart failure.

His best-known innovation is the Horsley–Clarke apparatus, developed in 1908 together with Robert H. Clarke, for performing the so-called stereotactic surgery, whereby a set of precise numerical coordinates are used to locate each brain structure. He was a pioneer in neurosurgery and operated on a total of 44 patients.

He authored the book Functions of the Marginal Convolutions (1884) and, as a co-author, Experiments upon the Functions of the Cerebral Cortex (1888) and Alcohol and the Human Body (1902).

== Political career ==
Horsley was a Liberal Party supporter and contested the December 1910 General election as a Liberal candidate for the London University seat. The Animal Defence and Anti-Vivisection Society campaigned against his election because of his involvement with vivisection. Following the election, he was adopted as prospective Liberal candidate, first for Islington East and then, in 1913, for Harborough in Leicestershire. Harborough was a Liberal seat and a general election, expected to take place in 1914 would most likely have seen him elected to parliament. However, he resigned as prospective candidate, citing opposition to his views on women's suffrage and temperance on the part of constituency officials, just before the First World War started.

Horsley strongly supported the Liberals' welfare state initiative, the National Insurance Act of 1911, despite strong opposition from most of his medical colleagues.

== First World War service and death ==
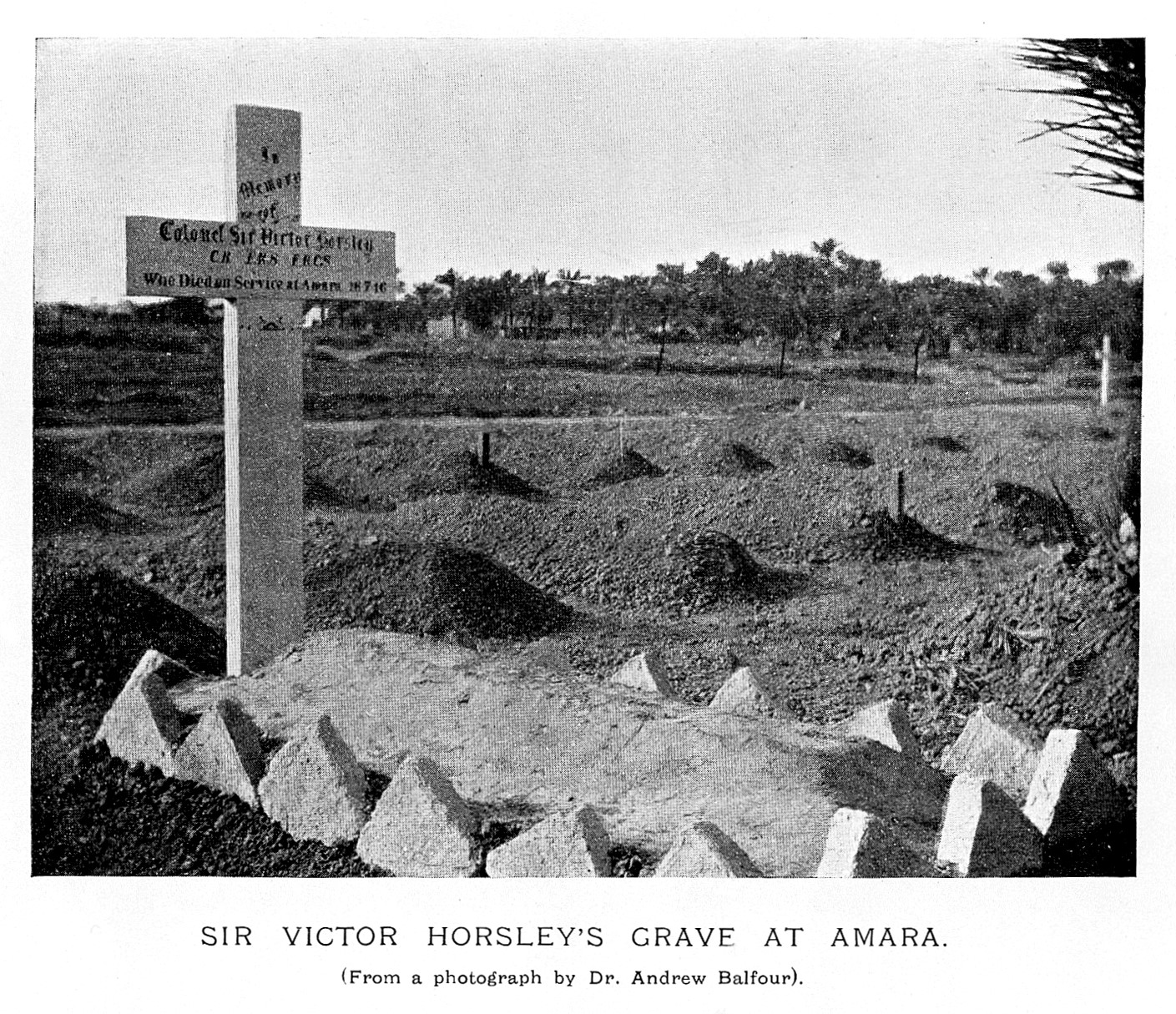
Grave of Victor Horsley at Amara War Cemetery.

In 1910, Horsley was commissioned as a captain in the Territorial Army, in the 3rd London General Hospital of the Royal Army Medical Corps. On the outbreak of the First World War, he volunteered for active duty on the Western Front, where he was initially posted as surgeon at the British hospital at Wimereux, France. In May 1915, he was posted as a colonel and Director of Surgery of the British Army Medical Service in Egypt, based at the 21st General Hospital in Alexandria, in support of the Dardanelles Campaign. In the following year, he volunteered for field surgery duty in Mesopotamia, where he died unexpectedly in Amarah, Iraq, on 16 July 1916, of heatstroke and severe hyperpyrexia, at only 59 years of age.

== Namesakes ==
Horsley was the first neurosurgeon appointed to the hospital in Queen Square, London, now called the National Hospital for Neurology and Neurosurgery – the Victor Horsley Department of Neurosurgery is named in his honour.

The Walton Centre for Neurology & Neurosurgery NHS Trust in Liverpool, England, another leading Neurosurgical Hospital, dedicated its intensive care unit to him, naming it the Horsley ward.

At its Annual Representatives Meeting, the British Medical Association has a series of lunchtime lectures entitled The Victor Horsley Lectures. After the Second Gulf War, a British Field Hospital was established at Shaibah Logistics Base, and the area of tented accommodation for hospital staff was known as Horsley Lines.

Horsley is credited with the invention of the "Horsley Hook", a device which he used to avulse the trigeminal nerve.

== Collections ==
In 1976 Horsley's daughter gave his archive to University College London. The collection was added to in 1987 and 2017 by further donations from Horsley's family. The collection includes Horsley's medical work, personal papers and correspondence of both Horsley and other family members, photographs, and postcards. The majority of the collection is from the period 1863 - 1916 and reflects Horsley's activity during this time.

Academic offices
| Preceded by George John Romanes | Fullerian Professor of Physiology; 1891–1894 | Succeeded by Charles Stewart |
