= Robert Lindley =

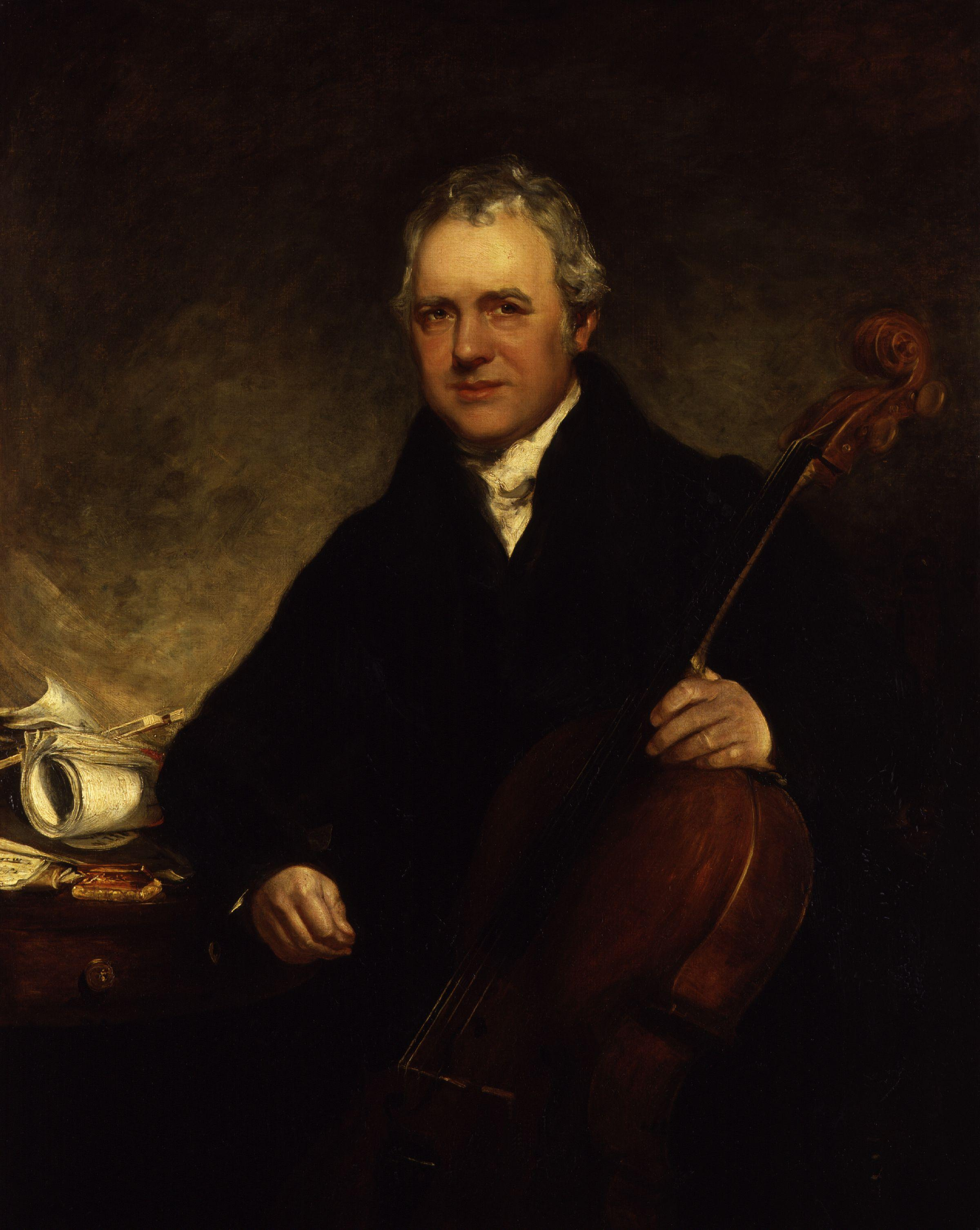

Background information
- Born: 4 March 1776; Rotherham, South Yorkshire, England
- Died: 13 June 1855 (aged 79); Greater London, England
- Instrument(s): Cello, Violin
- Years active: 1792–1855

Robert Lindley (4 March 1776 – 13 June 1855) was an English cellist and academic, described as "probably the greatest violoncellist of his time".

== Life ==
Lindley was born in Rotherham in 1776. His father, an amateur cellist, gave him lessons on the violin from age five, and on the cello from age nine. In 1792 the cellist James Cervetto, impressed by his playing, gave him free tuition. Lindley had an engagement at the theatre in Brighton, and while there played before the Prince Regent.

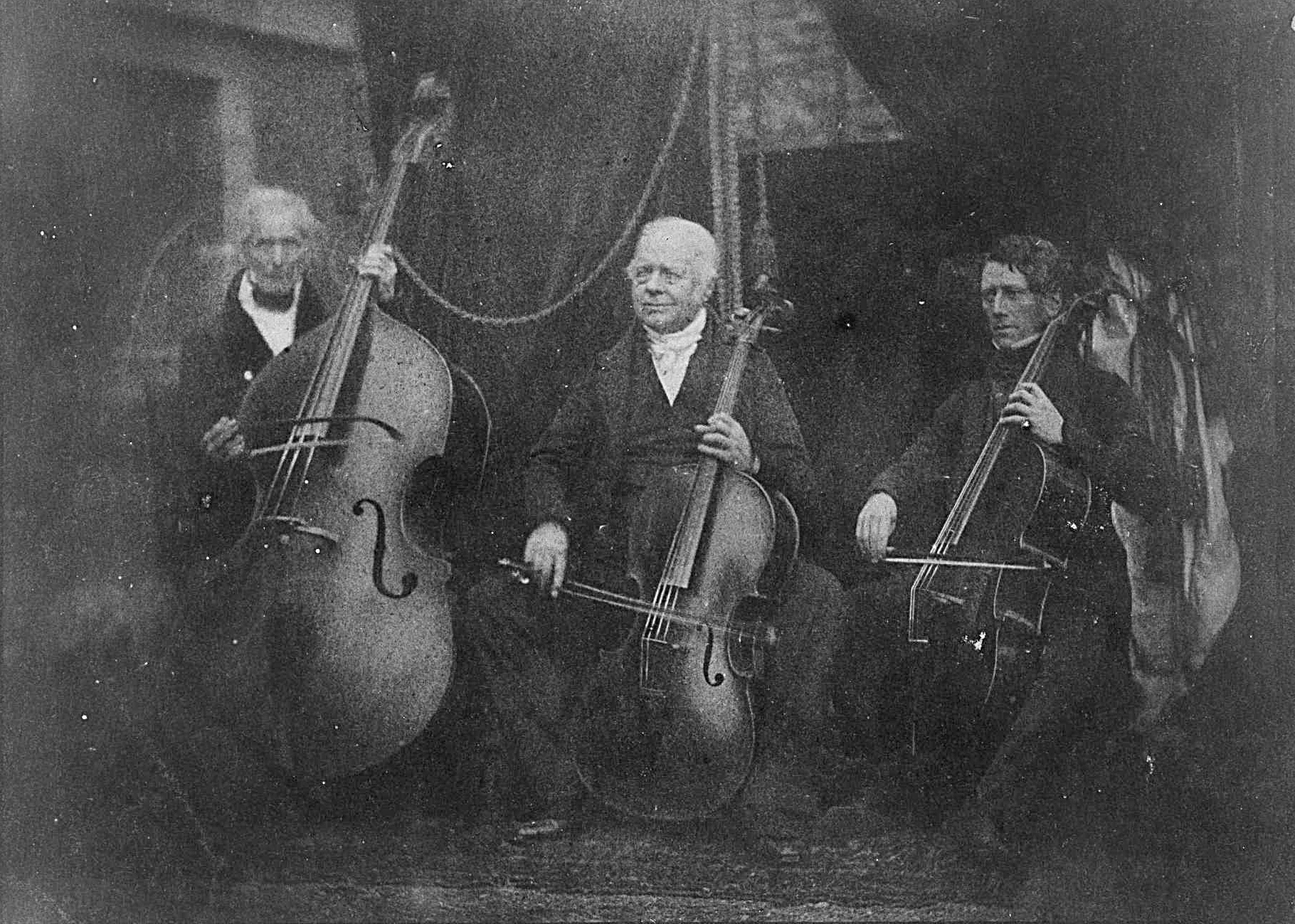
f.l.t.r. Dragonetti, Lindley, and perhaps Charles Lucas in a daguerreotype of 1841

In 1794 he succeeded Sperati as principal cello at Italian Opera in London, and at important concerts; he remained in the post until retirement in 1851. For many years he was a friend of the double-bass player Domenico Dragonetti, who joined the opera orchestra at the same time.

Lindley was appointed one of the first professors of the Royal Academy of Music in 1822, the year of its founding. His students included the cellist Charles Lucas, who succeeded him in the opera orchestra.

John Alexander Fuller Maitland wrote: "Lindley was probably the greatest violoncellist of his time". William Henry Husk described his playing: "Lindley's tone was remarkable for its purity, richness, mellowness and volume.... His technique, for that date, was remarkable, and his accompaniment of recitative was perfection." Lindley had a "great reputation as an accompanist" during a time in which cellists were required to improvise whilst accompanying singers.

== Family ==
His son William Lindley (1802–1869) also became a cellist; because of nervousness he did not fulfill his early promise, and withdrew from public performance. His daughter married the composer John Barnett in 1837.

== Compositions ==
Works include four cello concertos, thirty-five solos and duets for cello, a trio for bassoon, viola, and cello, Caprice Bohème for piano, and a handbook for the cello published in the year of his death.

William Henry Husk noted that "his composition was by no means equal to his execution".
