= Frederick T. Durrant =

English organist and composer

Frederick Thomas Durrant (1895 – January 1979), typically known as F.T. Durrant, was an organist, musical academic and composer, long resident in Harrow.

== Career ==
Durrant was born at Beer in Devon and was a chorister at Exeter Cathedral. He attended the Royal Academy of Music, where he won the Battison Haynes Prize in 1921 and the Charles Lucas Medal in 1923. In 1922 he married his wife Gladys Louise (1891–1975, also born in Beer) and they moved to Harrow-on-the Hill, at 71 Whitmore Road, where they stayed the rest of their lives. Durrant received his D.Mus. from the University of London in 1929, where he later became Dean of the Facility of Music. He was a professor at the Royal Academy from 1931, teaching harmony and composition.

From around 1937 he was organist at St Augustine's, Kilburn, moving on to become director of music at St Mark's Church, St John's Wood in 1947. He was also choirmaster and organist at Pinner Parish Church from 1954 until 1957, and after that moved to an organist appointment in Ruislip.

== Composition ==
His compositions included the Clarinet Quintet in E flat, inaugural winner of the Clements Memorial Prize in 1938, which was broadcast by the Whinyates String Quartet with soloist Pauline Juler on 22 July 1941, and subsequently performed at Conway Hall (also by Juler) in 1946. The Quintet was revived by Peter Cigleris at Conway Hall in 2019. His six part madrigal Requiescat won the Madrigal Society's 1947 prize. A slow march, scored for military band, won a Liverpool Philharmonic Society competition in 1952, and was performed on 25 June that year. The Variations on an Irish Air (The Meeting of the Waters) for solo piano was published by Augener in 1957. Most of his compositions were choral and organ pieces for church use.

== Final years ==
Durrant survived his wife Gladys, who died in 1975, aged 84. There were two children, a son and a daughter. Until 1976 he was still contributing concert reviews for the local papers in Harrow. Durrant died in January 1979, aged 83. The memorial Durrant Prize was awarded for the first time in July 1980 by the Royal College of Organists.
