= Urinary bladder disease =

- Specialty: Urology

Urinary bladder disease includes urinary bladder inflammation such as cystitis, bladder rupture and bladder obstruction (tamponade). Cystitis is common, sometimes referred to as urinary tract infection (UTI) caused by bacteria, bladder rupture occurs when the bladder is overfilled and not emptied while bladder tamponade is a result of blood clot formation near the bladder outlet.

== Cystitis ==
Cystitis is a urinary bladder inflammation that results from any one of a number of distinct syndromes. It is most commonly caused by a bacterial infection in which case it is referred to as a urinary tract infection.

== Bladder trauma ==
Bladder rupture (rupture of bladder, N32.4) may occur if the bladder is overfilled and not emptied. This can occur in the case of binge drinkers who have consumed large quantities of fluids, but are not conscious of the need to urinate due to stupor. This condition is very rare in women, but does occur. Signs and symptoms include localized pain and uraemia (poisoning due to reabsorbed waste).

=== Intra- and extraperitoneal rupture ===
Bladder rupture is divided into intraperitoneal and extraperitoneal rupture, with the latter encompassing 85% of post-traumatic bladder rupture. Intraperitoneal rupture is both more rare and associated with greater morbidity, requiring surgical repair due to the risk of non-healing and gram negative sepsis.

Ultrasound showing bladder rupture - Week 1

Ultrasound showing bladder rupture - Week 2

== Bladder tamponade ==
Bladder tamponade is obstruction of the bladder outlet due to heavy blood clot formation within it. It generally requires surgery. Such heavy bleeding is usually due to bladder cancer.

== See also ==
- Underactive bladder
- Overactive bladder
