= Emma Lomax =

English composer and pianist

Louise Emily (Emma) Lomax (22 June 1873 – 29 August 1963) was an English composer and pianist. She was born in Brighton, daughter of the curator of Brighton Free Library and Museum. She attended the Brighton School of Music and then the Royal Academy of Music in London studying clarinet, and composition with Frederick Corder. She was a Goring Thomas Scholar from 1907 to 1910 and won the Charles Lucas Medal in 1910, awarded for her Theme and Variations for orchestra.

After completing her studies, Lomax became a professor at the Royal Academy of Music (1918-38), and taught at Brighton College. She was a friend and collaborator of English composer and pianist Eleanor Rudall. Much of her music was dramatically inspired, including a series of recitations and dramatic sketches, some with supernatural themes and with orchestral or piano accompaniment. For instance, The House of Shadows, performed at the Royal Academy in 1904, was described as "a poetic play in two Acts [which] involved several remarkable electric lighting effects devised by [the composer]".

The Toy Overture, a parody of Tchaikovsky's 1812 Overture, was performed by The Brighton Municipal Orchestra in 1915. Her opera The Marsh of Vervais was never fully staged, though Dan Godfrey conducted the Prelude to Act 2 at a Bournemouth Winter Gardens concert in January 1927.

Lomax was a member of the Sussex Women's Musicians Club and the Society of Women Musicians. She lived at 11 Park Crescent in Brighton. In her later years she became interested in toy theatre, running the private Early Victorian Theatre in Brighton. She died in Brighton in 1963, aged 90.

== Works ==
Selected works include:

- Bishop Hatto, recitation to music
- The Brownie and the Piano Tuner (1907), dramatic sketch with orchestral accompaniment
- Four Nursery Rhymes, recitation to music
- The House of Shadows (1904), dramatic sketch with orchestral accompaniment
- Ida's Flowers, for orchestra (1906), four illustrations to Hans Christian Andersen
- The Marsh of Vervais, opera
- The Mother, recitation to music
- The Prince in Disguise, recitation to music (1908, revived at RAM Centenary, 1922)
- The Sisters, recitation to music
- The Storm Bird, cantata for female voices (1902)
- Toy Overture (1915)
- Variations on a Quaint Theme (1910), for orchestra
- The Whirlpool, cantata for female voices
- The Wolf (1906), dramatic sketch with piano accompaniment

There were also part-songs and solo songs. Lomax wrote the libretto for Bertram Walton O’Donnell's comic opera The Demon's Bride (1909). Her professional articles include:

- "Dr Ebenezer Prout -- and Bach," Music in Education, vol. 23 (July–August 1959), p. 76.
