= Edmund Jenkins =

American composer

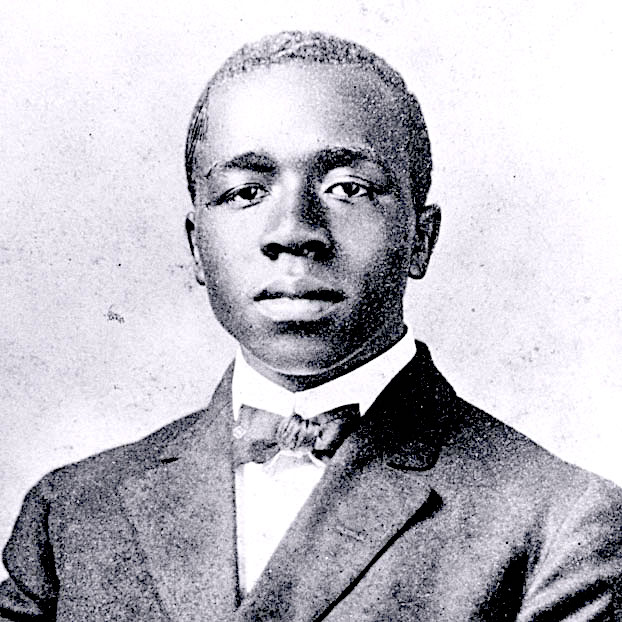
- Education: Royal Academy of Music
- Occupation: composer

Edmund Thornton Jenkins (1894–1926) was an American composer who spent much of his life in Europe.

== Biography ==
=== Charleston ===
Jenkins was born in Charleston, South Carolina where his Baptist-minister father, Reverend Daniel Joseph Jenkins, had set up and run the Jenkins Orphanage, which became internationally well-known for its wind band. Edmund Jenkins studied clarinet, piano and violin at the Atlanta Baptist College (now Morehouse College), and played in and directed the Jenkins Orphanage Band.

=== London ===
In 1914 the orphanage band travelled to England to perform at the Anglo-American Exposition in London. Edmund remained in London where, aged 20, he enrolled at the Royal Academy of Music (RAM) to study clarinet, piano, singing and composition. At the RAM he was awarded an orchestral scholarship (1915–17), prizes for singing, clarinet and piano playing, the Charles Lucas prize for composition (1918), Battison Haynes prize for composition (1918) and the Ross Scholarship (1919–21). On leaving the RAM he was made an Associate of the Royal Academy of Music. While in London Edmund Jenkins worked as an orchestral musician in theatre orchestras and dance bands resulting in his participation in a number of recordings.

=== Paris ===
In 1924 Edmund Jenkins moved to Paris where he established the Anglo-Continental-American Music Press while also performing and composing. He died in Paris 'from causes unknown' after being admitted to the city's Tenon hospital.

== Works ==
=== Chamber ensemble ===
- (n.d.) Chanson; violin and piano
- (n.d.) Commodo quasi allegro (poco martial); piano and solo instrument
- (n.d.) Dance; cello and piano
- (n.d.) Romanesque: violin and piano
- (1916) Overture to Much Ado about Nothing; piano and strings
- (1919) Andante quasi lento, or Allegro energico; flute, 2 clarinets, horn, piano
- (1919) Rêverie-Fantasie; violin and piano
- (1919) Slow movement and rondo [Lento ma non troppo]; woodwind quartet
- (1925) The Saxophone Strut; saxophone and piano
- (1926) Sonata in A minor; violin [cello?] and piano

=== Opera ===
- 1924 Operetta: Afram, ou La Belle Swita, Roman Africain

=== Orchestral works ===
- (n.d.) Allegro strepitoso
- (n.d.) Andante, with solo clarinet and solo cello
- (n.d.) Ballet: Processional; Pas Seul; Danse Generale
- (n.d.) Concerto; for clarinet
- (n.d.) Rhapsody on American Folk Tunes)
- (n.d.) Rhapsodic Overture
- (1917) Prélude Religieuse, with organ
- (1918) Romance, with solo violin
- (1925) African War Dance
- (1917?/1925) [Folk?] Rhapsody No. 1: Charlestonia, op. 12
- (1917/1926) Folk Rhapsody No 2: Rhapsodie spirituelle'
- (1926) Symphony, op. 12

=== Organ ===
- (1917?/1926) Prélude Religieux

=== Piano ===
- (n.d.) The Cabaret Brawl, or Double-crossing the Stool Pigeon
- (n.d.) Characteristic American Indian Dances
- (n.d.) Negro Symphonie Dramatique. Scenes de la Vie d’un Esclave
- (1920/1925) Spring Fancies

=== Songs ===
==== with orchestra ====
- (1916) Love’s Hour
- (1917) How Sweet is Life
- (1925) That place called Italie [sic]
- (1926?) A Prayer

==== with piano ====
- (n.d.) I want You Near Me
- (n.d.) Je te desire pres de moi; fox-trot'
- (n.d.) Jungle Blues; fox-trot
- (n.d.) Kiss Baby Good Night
- (n.d.) The Lilac Tree
- (n.d.) Pampa Blues
- (n.d.) 'Si je vous dis, je vous aime
- (n.d.) Through the Metidja to Abd-el-Kadr
- (n.d.) Trying
- (n.d.) Your Voice I Hear
- (1910) Baby Darling, Baby Mine
- (1916) Love's Hour
- (1917) A Romance
- (1917) Doubting
- (1917) The Fiddler's Fiddle
- (1925) Amber Eyes
- (1925) If I Were to Tell You I Love You
- (1925) Three Songs: Doubting; A Romance; The Fiddler’s Fiddle
- (1926) A Preyer
- (1926) That Place Called Italy
