= Eleanor Rudall =

English composer, pianist and teacher

Eleanor Clementine Rudall (26 April 1881 – 6 May 1960) was a composer and pianist, who after a promising start while a student at the Royal Academy of Music struggled to find more widespread recognition. She continued her career teaching piano, harmony and composition, and in 1927 became the second wife of composer Frederick Corder. She was a friend and collaborator of English composer and pianist Emma Lomax.

== Education and early career ==
Rudall was born at 25 Upper Phillimore Place, Kensington (now Kensington High Street), the daughter of composer and author Henry Alexander Rudall (1837–1896) and Jane Sinclair Bails. H.A. Rudall wrote a biography in the Great Composers series on Beethoven in 1890. She studied at the Royal Academy of Music, where she won the R.A.M. Club prize for composition in 1906.

Her Introduction and Allegro for string octet was played at a Royal Academy concert in 1906. Four Orchestral Illustrations (inspired by the paintings of G F Watts), were performed at a Queen's Hall student concert on 25 June 1907. Rudall won the Charles Lucas Medal for composition in 1908 for her Suite of Three Movements for orchestra. Her orchestral Variations on an Irish Air was also performed that year. The ambitious operatic prelude The Rock of Aesjoen for soloists, chorus and orchestra was heard at another Queen's Hall student concert on 30 June 1909, conducted by Frederick Corder.

== Marriage and later career ==
On 7 November 1927 in Hampstead Rudall became Corder's second wife. By then aged 75, he had retired from the music profession three years earlier. They lived at his house, 13, Albion Road (now Harben Road), South Hampstead, where she continued to live after his death in 1932.

By the mid-1930s Rudall was a professor of harmony and composition at the Royal Academy, while also teaching piano at the Tobias Matthay Piano School. On 9 November 1938 she organized a concert of her compositions at the Queen Mary Hall, Great Russell Street, including two String Quartets. She became involved in the running of the Society of Women Composers and this resulted in performances of her music at Society concerts, such as the Phantasie for violin and piano played in July 1934, and a string trio in November 1950. She died in May 1960, aged 79.

In her 1950 entry for Who's Who in Music, Rudall listed more of her compositions, now all unknown, including three String Quartets, a Piano Quintet, a Cello Sonata, To a Passer By for chorus and orchestra, and Ballad of Summer Waters, for female voices. There are published song settings of Robert Bridges' The Robin and Christina Rossetti's Spring Quiet, and the Spring Pastoral for piano four hands.
