= Bone wax =

Substance used to control bleeding

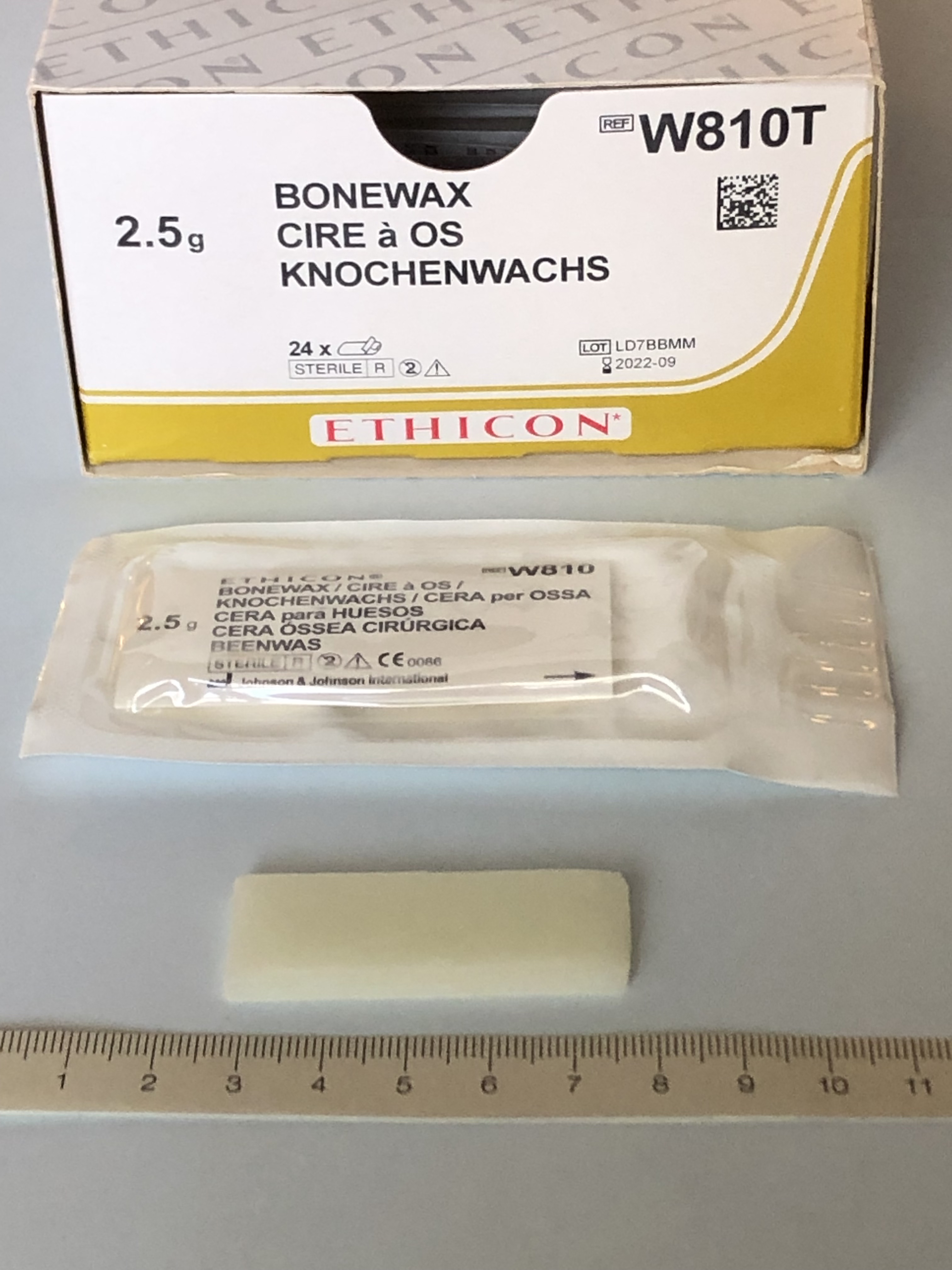
Bone wax as a sterile preparation for surgery

Bone wax is a waxy substance used to help mechanically control bleeding from bone surfaces during surgical procedures.

It is generally made of beeswax with a softening agent such as paraffin or petroleum jelly and is smeared across the bleeding edge of the bone, blocking the holes and causing immediate bone hemostasis through a tamponade effect. Bone wax is most commonly supplied in sterile sticks, and usually requires softening before it can be applied.

== History ==
A note by Victor Horsley published in the British Medical Journal in 1892 described a formulation of "antiseptic wax" having seven parts beeswax, one part almond oils, and 1% salicylic acid. The material was useful for controlling bleeding when pressed into the pores and channels of cut or damaged bone. The wax was sterilized by boiling and kept in stoppered bottles. This material soon became the standard of care for bleeding control in bone for general orthopedics, craniomaxillofacial surgery, and cardiothoracic surgery, where the sternum is often split longitudinally to provide access to the heart.

== Action ==
Ordinary bone wax is effective by virtue of its tamponade action, but is considered to have no active hemostatic properties (i.e. does not activate the blood clotting cascade). In addition, bone wax is not soluble in the bodily fluids and thus remains at the site of implantation for long periods of time, if not indefinitely. The portion of traditional bone wax that departs the implant site is most likely carried away through the action of the foreign body response and is associated with a low-grade inflammatory response at and near the implant site. The residual product can also potentially serve as a nidus (breeding site) for post-operative infection.

== Modern formulations ==
Modern day bone wax is commercially available in substantially non-absorbable formulations similar to Horsley's original composition, as well as in absorbable/resorbable formats. Most are available as a firm wax in stick form that must be softened by kneading prior to use.

More recent advances have led to the introduction of a bone hemostat in putty format. Hemostatic putties act via tamponade in the same way as the stick waxes, but are ready to use and eliminate the requirement to soften the product prior to use.
