= Tamponade =

Wound closure

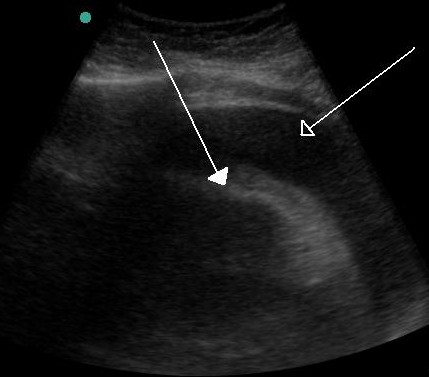
A very large hemorrhagic pericardial effusion due to malignancy as seen on ultrasound which was causing tamponade. closed arrow: the heart, open arrow: the effusion

Tamponade (/ˌtæm.pəˈneɪd/) is the closure or blockage (as of a wound or body cavity) by or as if by a tampon, especially to stop bleeding. Tamponade is a useful method of stopping a hemorrhage. This can be achieved by applying an absorbent dressing directly into a wound, thereby absorbing excess blood and creating a blockage, or by applying direct pressure with a hand or a tourniquet. This usage is not to be confused with a tamponade that occurs as a result of health problems. For example, cardiac tamponade is a condition where fluid collects in the pericardial sac increasing pressure within the pericardium which in turn prevents the ventricles from expanding fully significantly reducing the efficiency of the heart. It is considered a medical emergency and if left unchecked is fatal.

Bladder tamponade is obstruction of the urinary bladder outlet due to heavy blood clot formation within it. It generally requires surgery. Such heavy bleeding is usually due to bladder cancer.

Pressing bone wax into bleeding bone is considered hemostasis by tamponade, as opposed to methods which physically or biochemically activate the clotting cascade.

Gas tamponade has been used for retinal detachment surgery, helping reduce the rate of fluid flow through retinal tears. Research suggests that patients undergoing surgery with tamponade agents of C_{3}F_{8} gas and standard silicone oil had the best visual and anatomic outcomes, over other tamponade agents.
