= Rosamund Brunel Gotch =

English costume designer, illustrator and writer (1864–1949)

Rosamund Brunel Gotch (27 February 1864 – 22 January 1949) was an English stage costume designer, illustrator and writer.

She was born Rosamund Brunel Horsley in Cranbrook, Kent, the youngest of four sons and three daughters. Her parents were the artist John Calcott Horsley and his second wife Rosamund Haden, sister of the etcher Seymour Haden. She was named Brunel after her uncle by marriage Isambard Kingdom Brunel. Her brother Victor Horsley became famous as a surgeon and neuropathologist. Her elder sister Frances (aka Fanny Marion, later Lady Whitelegge, 1859–1949) married the doctor and occupational health pioneer Sir Arthur Whitelegge.

Rosamund married the Oxford neurophysiologist Francis Gotch at St. Margaret's Church, Westminster on 15 December 1887. They lived at 'The Lawn', 89 Banbury Road in Oxford. As an illustrator, she contributed a frontispiece and twenty plates of human hand lithographs to Edward Heron-Allen's chirognomy and cheiromancy manual A Manual of Cheirosophy (1900). Francis Gotch died in 1913.

Later in life she worked for many years as a stage costume designer, dressing over 160 productions at the Royal College of Music's Parry Theatre, including three operas by Vaughan Williams: Hugh the Drover (1924), The Shepherds of the Delectable Mountains (1925) and Sir John in Love (1929). She became a friend of Vaughan Williams and Hugh Allen.

Gotch wrote two books connected to her family history. In 1934 she edited for publication a collection of the letters of Fanny and Sophy Horsley, daughters of the composer William Horsley, between 1833 and 1836, recalling events at No. 1, High Row, Kensington Gravel Pits (now 128 Kensington Church Street) at a time when Felix Mendelssohn was a frequent visitor. Rosamund Gotch grew up in the same house. The second book was a biography of her great-great-aunt by marriage Maria, Lady Callcott.

She died at 20 St Giles, Oxford in January 1949, aged 84. Her daughter was the violist Veronica Gotch, a member of the Whinyates String Quartet in the 1930s and early 1940s.
