= James Perry Goodbody =

Irish politician (1877–1952)

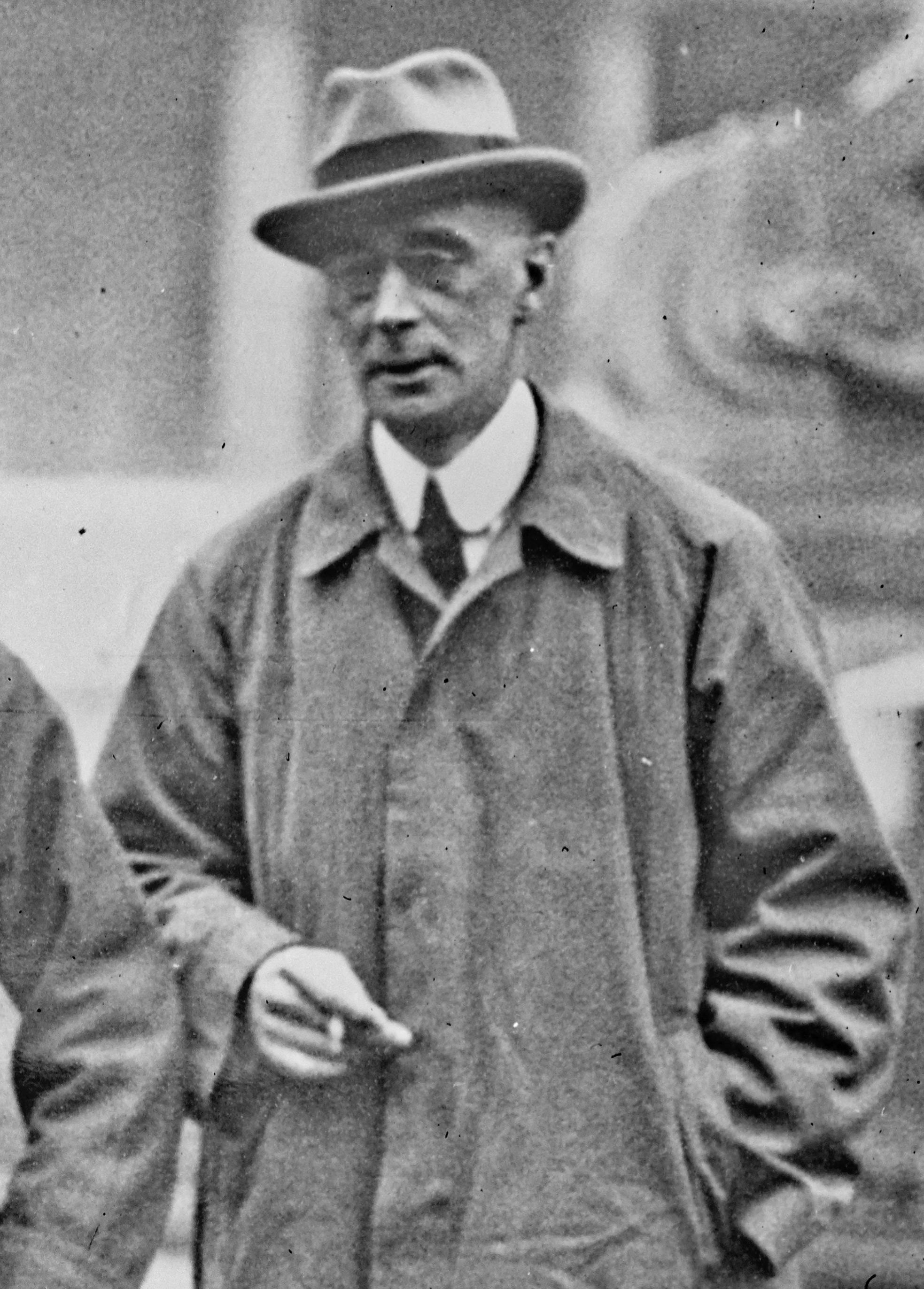
- Goodbody in 1922

Senator
- In office 11 December 1922 – 12 December 1928

Personal details
- Born: 22 March 1877
- Died: 21 March 1952 (aged 74)
- Party: Independent

James Perry Goodbody (22 March 1877 – 21 March 1952) was an Irish politician. He was an independent member of Seanad Éireann from 1922 to 1928. From County Limerick, he was nominated to the Seanad by the President of the Executive Council in 1922 for 6 years. He was one of three quakers nominated. He did not contest the 1928 Seanad election.
