= Edmund W. Eyre =

Irish politician (c. 1856–1929)

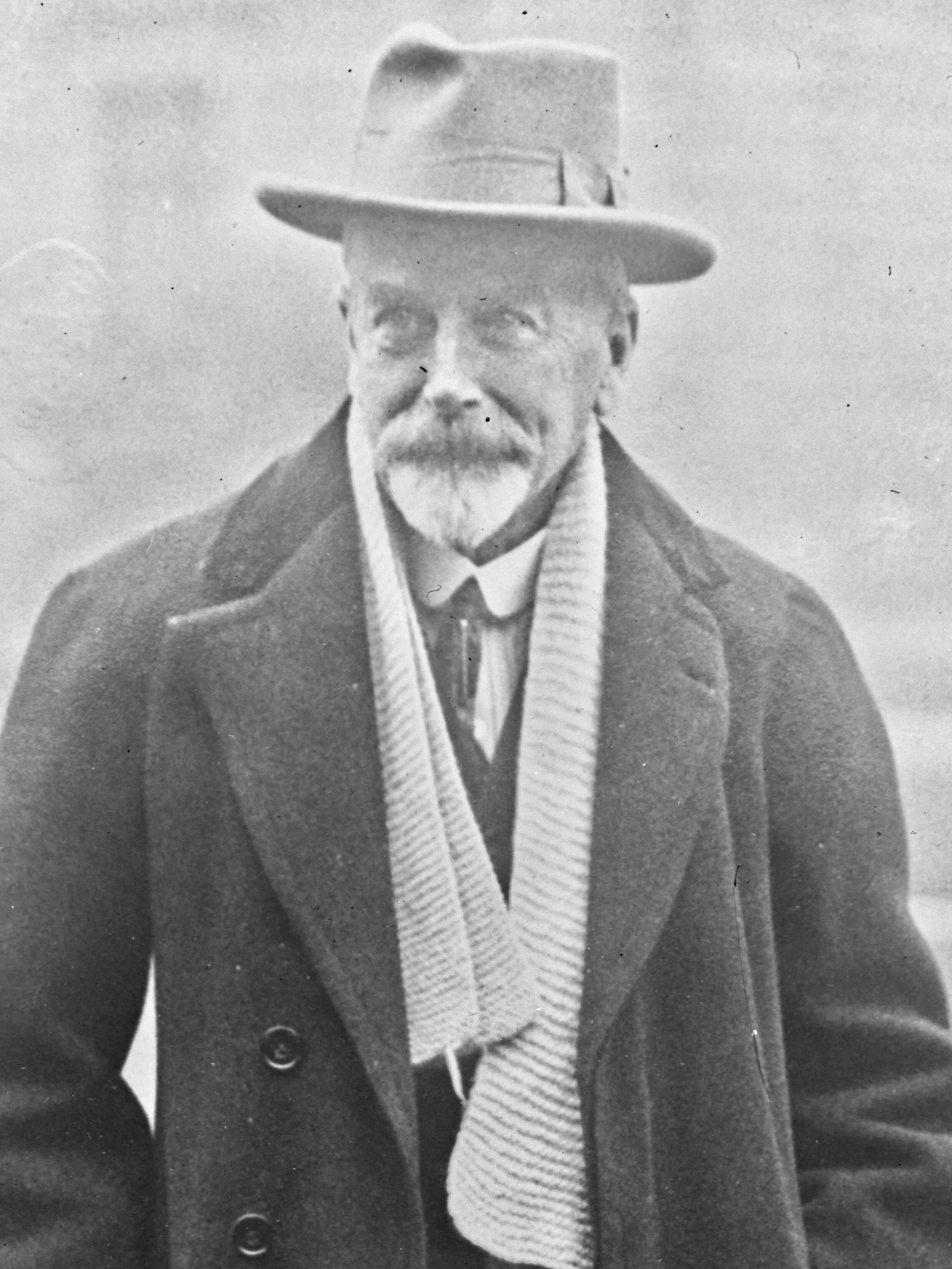
- Eyre in 1922

Senator
- In office 11 December 1922 – 12 December 1928

Personal details
- Born: c. 1856; Galway, Ireland
- Died: 7 July 1929 (aged 72–73); Dublin, Ireland
- Political party: Independent

Edmund William Eyre (c. 1856 – 7 July 1929) was an Irish politician. He was an independent member of Seanad Éireann from 1922 to 1928. A former official of Dublin Corporation, he was nominated to the Seanad by the President of the Executive Council in 1922 for 6 years. He did not contest the 1928 Seanad election.

Eyre, the son of a solicitor, was City Treasurer of Dublin for twenty-eight years up to 1921. He retired from the Seanad on the grounds of ill health and died at his home at Stillorgan, Dublin, on 7 July 1929 aged 73.
