= Francis Gotch =

British neurophysiologist

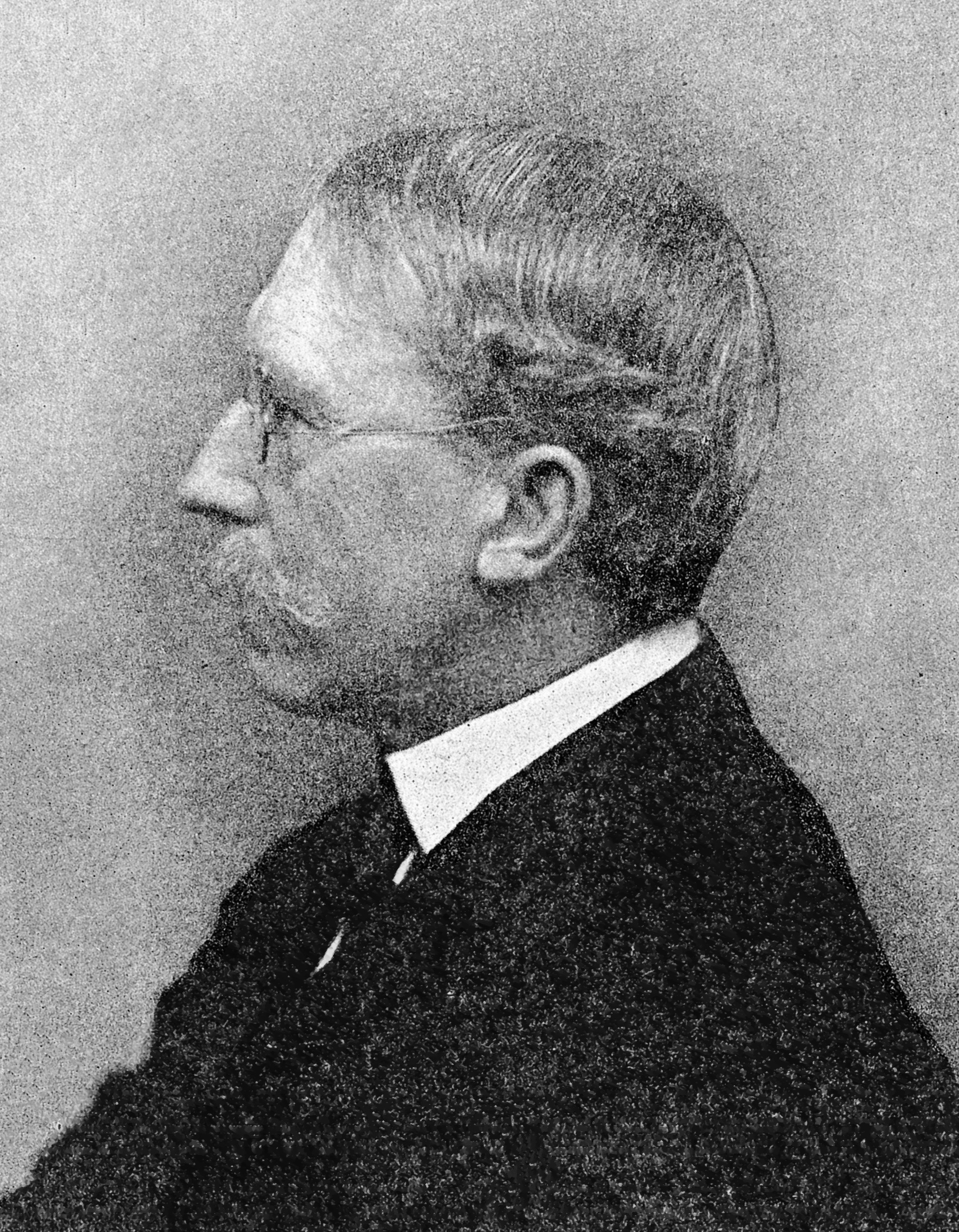
Francis Gotch

Francis Gotch(13 July 1853 – 15 July 1913) was a British neurophysiologist who was professor of physiology at University College Liverpool and, from 1905, Waynflete Professor of Physiology at Oxford University.

He was educated at Amersham Hall School and then at London University graduating B.A. in 1873 and then B.Sc. After studying medicine he qualified M.R.C.S. in 1881. In 1887 he married Rosamund Brunel Horsley (1864-1949), the younger daughter of the artist John Callcott Horsley.

He made several pioneer contributions to British neurophysiology. With his brother-in-law, Victor Horsley (1857–1916), he performed research involving localization of brain function via electrical stimulation of the cortex, and also demonstrated that the mammalian brain was capable of producing electric current.

In 1899 he described the "inexcitable" or "refractory phase" that takes place between nerve impulses. He also performed significant research in the field of electroretinography.

In 1891, with Horsley, he delivered the Croonian Lecture before the Royal Society of London, entitled "On The Mammalian Nervous System: Its Functions, And Their Localization Determined By An Electrical Method". In June 1892 he was elected a Fellow of the Royal Society

His body was interred at Wolvercote Cemetery.
