= Michael Mulcahy (painter) =

Irish expressionist painter (born 1952)

Michael Mulcahy (born 1952, in Waterford) is an Irish expressionist painter who lives and works in Paris, but returns frequently to Ireland.

Michael Mulcahy was educated at the Crawford Municipal School of Art in Cork and the National College of Art and Design in Dublin. He has travelled extensively, particularly in north and west Africa where he has lived and worked in the local community. The Douglas Hyde Gallery in Dublin held a major exhibition of his work in 1994. He has at least one child, a girl. He now resides in Wexford, and opened a working gallery in the town.

== Work in collections ==
- The Arts Council of Ireland including:

== References and external links ==
- Dorothy Walker (2003), Mulcahy, Michael in Brian Lalor (Ed.) The Encyclopedia of Ireland. Dublin: Gill & Macmillan. ISBN 0-7171-3000-2.
