= Seymour Whinyates =

British violinist

Seymour Whinyates (1895 – 24 December 1978) was a British violinist and music administrator, leader of the Whinyates String Quartet, which performed in the 1930 and early 1940s.

Born in Fretherne, Gloucestershire, she studied violin with William Henry Reed, then became an exhibitioner at the Royal College of Music, where she worked with the Spanish violinist Enrique Fernández Arbós. She then continued her studies in Berlin with Andrew Moser and in Paris with Lucien Capet. In 1933 her translation of Albert Jarosy's A New Theory of Fingering: Paganini and His Secret was published by Allen & Unwin.

The Whinyates String Quartet was formed in 1930, and gave its first BBC broadcast in December 1932. Other members of the quartet included Dorothy Everitt (violin), Veronica Gotch (viola) and Helen Just (cello). Their repertoire included British music by Frederick T. Durrant, Herbert Howells and Charles Wood. The quartet was disbanded in 1942.

During World War II, Whinyates joined the London Ambulance Service. She became director of music at the British Council in 1946 until her retirement in 1959, when she was awarded the OBE. She was also a member of the Arts Council Music Panel, and the Royal Musical Association, from which she resigned in June 1961. She died in Wadhurst, East Sussex in December 1978.
