= Arthur Herbert Jackson =

English composer

Arthur Herbert Jackson (1852–1881) was an English composer.

== Life ==
He was born in London, the son of Isaac Jackson and his wife Jane Dubbin. He was a student from 1872 at the Royal Academy of Music, where he won the Lucas medal for composition for the first movement of a Symphony. In 1878 he was elected a professor of harmony and composition there. He died, aged 29, on 27 September 1881, from tuberculous meningitis.

== Works ==
Jackson's manuscript orchestral compositions were:

- Andante and Allegro Giocoso, published for the piano, 1881;
- Overture to the Bride of Abydos;
- Intermezzo;
- Concerto for pianoforte and orchestra, played by Agnes Zimmermann at the Philharmonic Society's concert, 30 June 1880, and the pianoforte part published the same year;
- Violin concerto in E, played by Prosper Sainton at Frederic Hymen Cowen's orchestral concert, 4 December 1880.

For the piano he published: Toccata, 1874; March and Waltz, Brighton, 1878; In a boat, barcarolle, Elaine, 1879; Andante con variazione, 1880; Capriccio; Gavotte and Musette, and Song of the Stream, Brighton, 1880; three Humorous Sketches, 1880; and fugue in E, both for four hands; three Danses Grotesques, 1881.

His vocal pieces were: manuscript, two masses for male voices; Magnificat; cantata, Jason, The Siren's Song, for female voices, harp, violin, and pianoforte, published 1885; Twas when the seas were roaring, four-part song, 1882; O Nightingale, duet; and songs: Lullaby, Who knows?, I meet thee, love, again (1879), Pretty little Maid, The Lost Boat.
