= Arthur Jackson (Irish politician) =

Irish politician (1853–1938)

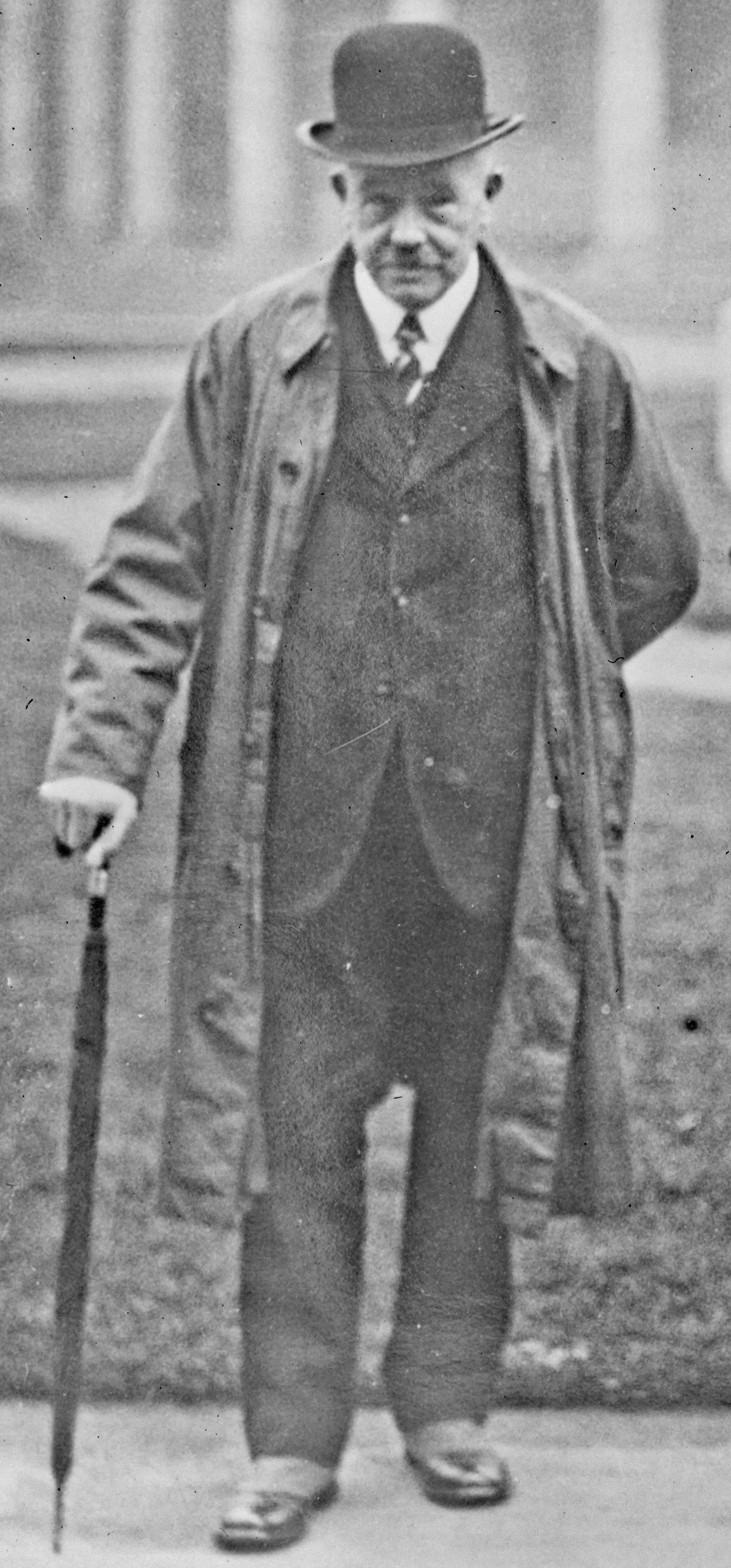
- Jackson in 1922

Senator
- In office 11 December 1922 – 12 December 1928

Personal details
- Born: 1853 County Armagh, Ireland
- Died: 6 February 1938 (aged 84–85) County Sligo, Ireland
- Party: Independent

Arthur Jackson (1853 – 6 February 1938) was an Irish politician. He was an independent member of Seanad Éireann from 1922 to 1928. From County Armagh, moved to County Sligo following his marriage to the daughter of a local merchant family, the Pollexfens. He was nominated to the Seanad by the President of the Executive Council in 1922 for 6 years. He did not contest the 1928 Seanad election.

Businessman and "the last of the great merchants who made Sligo famous as a trading port", Arthur Jackson was born in Belfast. He moved to Sligo in the 1870s, was High Sheriff of the county in 1899 and died at his home, Lisroyan House, Sligo, on 6 February 1938.
