= 1946 in art =

Events from the year 1946 in art.

== Events ==
- March – Art collector Peggy Guggenheim publishes the first edition of her autobiographical Out of This Century in the United States.
- April 2 – Jackson Pollock's third solo exhibition opens in the Daylight Gallery of Peggy Guggenheim's The Art of This Century gallery on Manhattan.
- May 22 – The Equestrian statue of Christian V recast in bronze by Einar Utzon-Frank (1688 original by Abraham-César Lamoureux) is unveiled on Kongens Nytorv, Copenhagen.
- October 11 – National Gallery of Bosnia and Herzegovina established in Sarajevo.
- October 24 – In a double ceremony, Max Ernst (having been divorced from Peggy Guggenheim) marries Dorothea Tanning and Man Ray marries Juliet Browner in Beverly Hills, California.
- The Vienna School of Fantastic Realism is founded by Ernst Fuchs, Rudolf Hausner, and others.
- The Borough Group of artists is founded in London by Cliff Holden.
- Jean Dubuffet exhibits the series of works with paint mixed with sand and gravel, Hautes Pâtes, at the Galerie René Drouin.
- Jacob Lawrence begins painting his War Series.
- Sidney Nolan begins his first series of paintings of Ned Kelly.
- David Olère begins to produce artworks based on his experiences as Jewish Sonderkommando inmate 106144 of Auschwitz concentration camp during World War II.
- Musée de la Chartreuse, Molsheim, France, established (at this time under the name "Musée municipal")

== Awards ==
- Archibald Prize: William Dargie – L C Robson, MC, MA

== Works ==
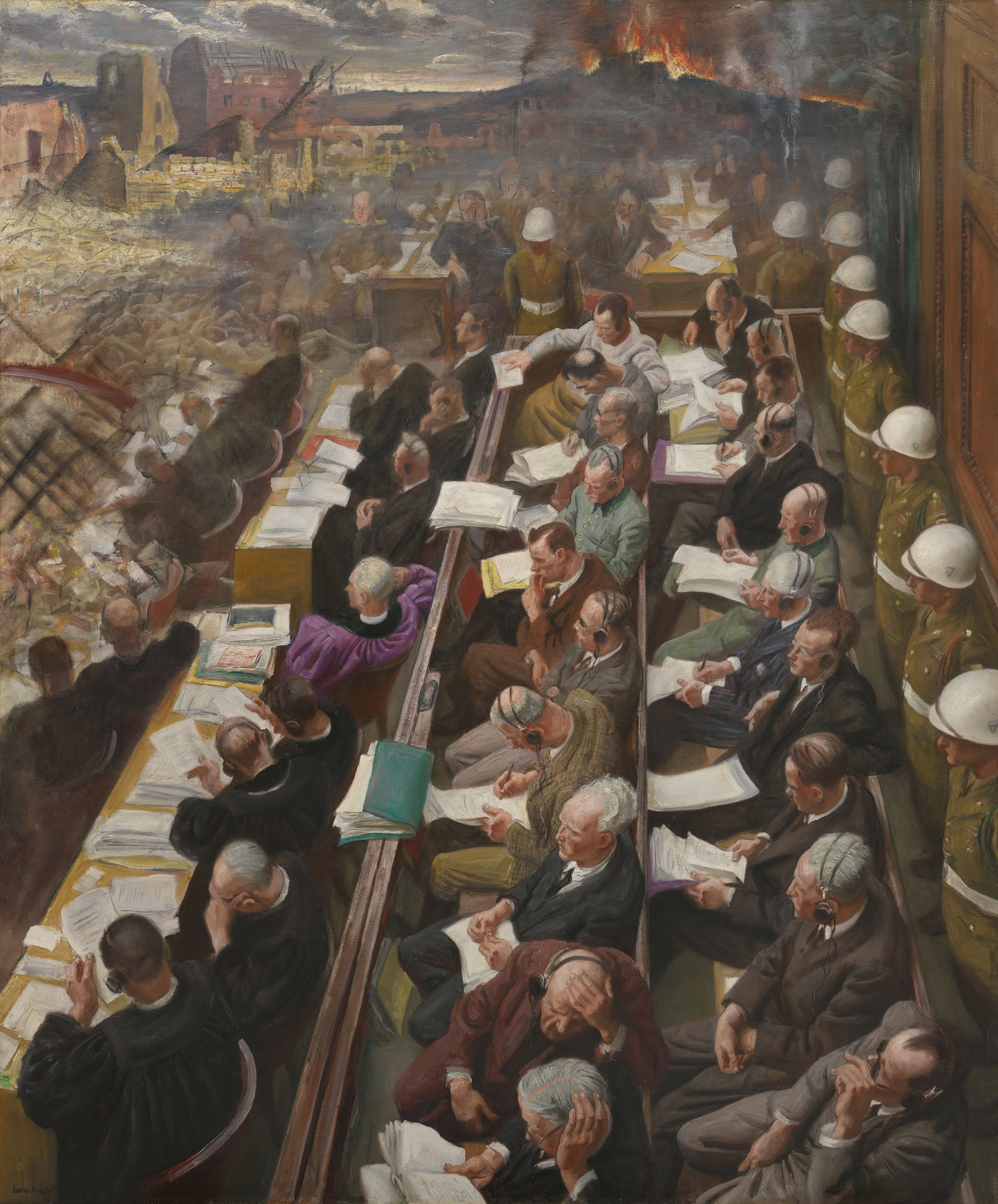
The Nuremberg Trial by Laura Knight

- Harold Abbott – Triptych of Suffering
- George Ault – Bright Light at Russell's Corners
- Francis Bacon
  - Painting (1946)
  - Study for Man with Microphones (later abandoned and slashed by the artist)
- Charles Comfort – Dieppe Raid
- Dean Cornwell – The History of Transportation (lobby mural at 10 Rockefeller Plaza in New York City, at this time the headquarters of Eastern Airlines)
- Salvador Dalí – The Temptation of St. Anthony
- Jean Dubuffet – Apartment Houses
- Jacob Epstein – Bust of Winston Churchill
- M. C. Escher – lithographs
  - Magic Mirror
  - Three Spheres II
- Sawlaram Haldankar – Glow of Hope
- Barbara Hepworth – sculptures
  - Pelagos
  - Tides
- Edward Hopper – Approaching a City
- Laura Knight – The Nuremberg Trial
- L. S. Lowry – Good Friday, Daisy Nook
- Henri Matisse – L'Asie
- Georgia O'Keeffe – Bare Tree Trunks With Snow
- Pablo Picasso – Woman-Flower
- Ad Reinhardt – How to Look at Modern Art in America
- Norman Rockwell – "Boy in a Dining Car"
- William Scott – The Frying Pan
- Andrew Wyeth – Winter 1946
- Jack Butler Yeats
  - Men of Destiny
  - The Whistle of a Jacket

== Exhibitions ==
- Contemporary British Art – Toledo Museum of Art, Ohio, the Albright-Knox Art Gallery, Buffalo, New York, and the City Art Museum, St Louis.

== Births ==
- January 8 – Betty Beaumont, Canadian American site-specific artist, all media
- January 10 – Kalidas Karmakar, Bangladeshi artist (d. 2019)
- January 18 – Kirk Varnedoe, American art historian, writer and curator (d. 2003)
- January 26 – Timothy Clifford, English art historian and curator
- February 9 – Peter Linde, Swedish sculptor
- April 11 – Chris Burden, American performance and installation artist and sculptor (d. 2015)
- April 19 – John Langdon, American ambigram artist, graphic designer and typographer (d. 2026)
- April 27 – Nicholas Serota, English curator
- May 30 – Jan de Bie, Dutch painter and photographer (d. 2021)
- June 29 – Egon von Fürstenberg, Swiss fashion designer (d. 2004)
- July 6 – Jamie Wyeth, American realist painter
- July 11 – Chris Killip, Manx-born documentary photographer (d. 2020)
- July 25 – Nicole Farhi, French sculptor and fashion designer
- August 2 – Daniela Hammer-Tugendhat, Austrian art historian (d. 2025)
- August 16 – Louis-Pierre Bougie, Canadian painter and printmaker (d. 2021)
- September 27 – T. C. Cannon, Native American painter (d. 1978)
- November 4 – Robert Mapplethorpe, American photographer (d. 1989)
- November 5 – Herman Brood, Dutch musician, painter and media personality (d. 2001)
- November 20 – Alice Aycock, American sculptor and installation artist
- December 2 – Gianni Versace, Italian fashion designer (k. 1997)
- December 8 – Jacques Bourboulon, French nude and fashion photographer
- December 12 – Don Gummer, American sculptor
- December 25 – Christopher Frayling, English cultural historian

== Deaths ==
- January 2 – O'Galop (Marius Rossillon), French cartoonist (b. 1867)
- January 23 – Helene Schjerfbeck, Finnish painter (b. 1862)
- February 17
  - Dorothy Gibson, American artist's model and silent film actress (b. 1889)
  - Sir George Pirie, Scottish painter (b. 1863)
- July 11 – Paul Nash, English painter (b. 1889)
- July 13 – Alfred Stieglitz, American photographer (b. 1864)
- July 17 – Florence Fuller, Australian painter (b. 1867)
- October 7 - C. R. W. Nevinson, English war artist (b. 1889)
- October 28 – Manuel Ortíz de Zárate, Chilean painter (b. 1887)
- October 30 – Charles Despiau, French sculptor (b. 1874)
- November 23
  - Arthur Dove, American abstract painter (b. 1880)
  - Léon Spilliaert, Belgian symbolist painter and graphic artist (b. 1881)
- November 24 – László Moholy-Nagy, Hungarian painter and photographer (b. 1895)
- December 28 – Elie Nadelman, Polish-born American sculptor (b. 1882)
- December 29 – Arnold Friedman, American Modernist painter (b. 1874)
