= 1946 in Ireland =

- Centuries: 18th; 19th; 20th; 21st
- Decades: 1920s; 1930s; 1940s; 1950s; 1960s
- See also: 1946 in Northern Ireland; Other events of 1946; List of years in Ireland

Events from the year 1946 in Ireland.

== Incumbents ==
- President: Seán T. O'Kelly
- Taoiseach: Éamon de Valera (FF)
- Tánaiste: Seán Lemass (FF)
- Minister for Finance: Frank Aiken (FF)
- Chief Justice:
  - Timothy Sullivan (until 1 June 1946)
  - Conor Maguire (from 1 June 1946)
- Dáil: 12th
- Seanad: 5th

== Events ==
- 3 January – William Joyce, alias Lord Haw Haw, is hanged in Wandsworth Prison for treason.
- 7 January – the Minister for Education, Thomas Derrig, announces that because refugee children who arrived in Ireland during the war do not have a sufficient knowledge of the Irish language they cannot obtain the Leaving Certificate.
- 21 January – work starts on a comprehensive Irish-English dictionary.

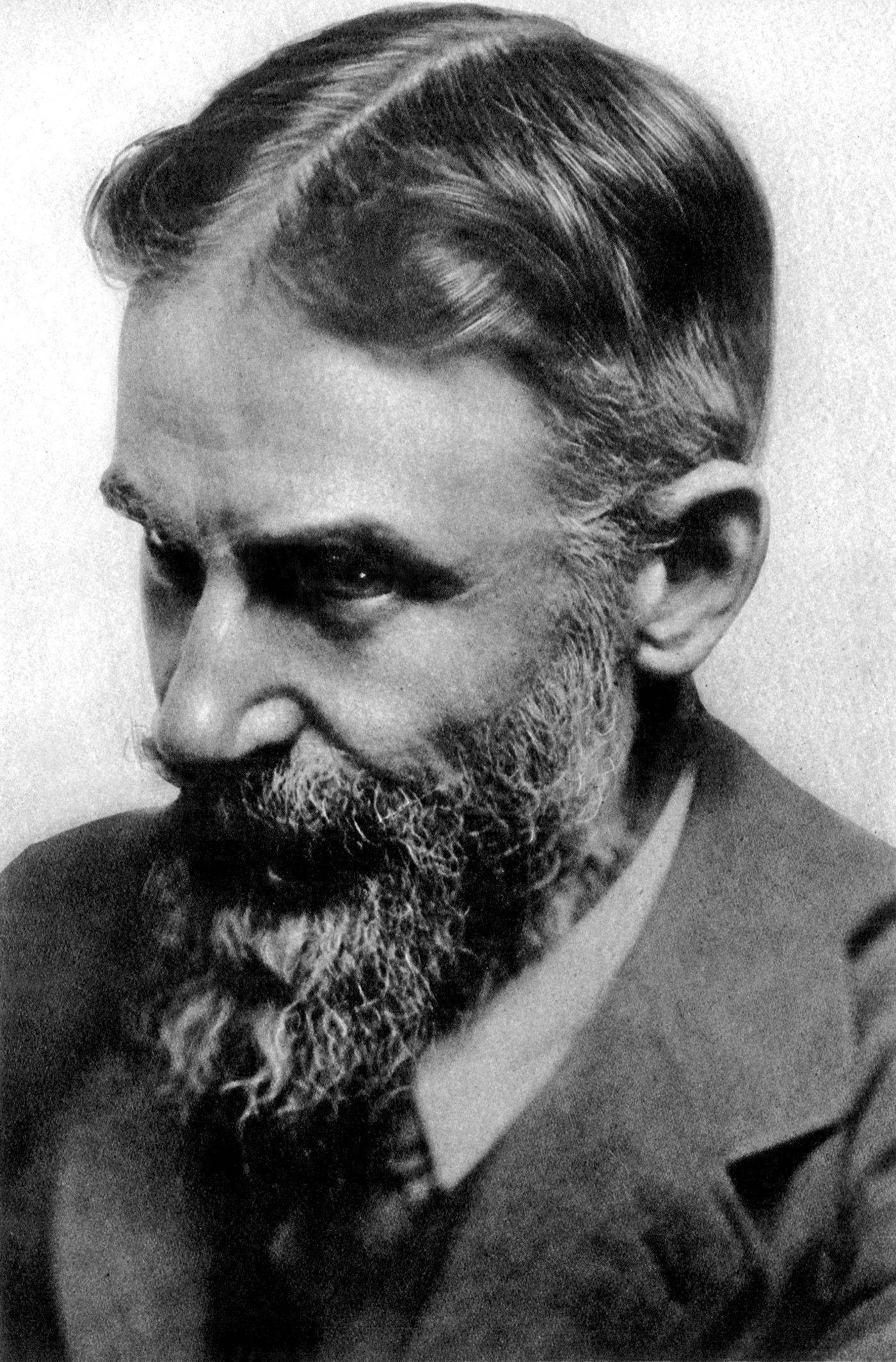
George Bernard Shaw

- 4 February – it is announced that George Bernard Shaw is to be awarded the freedom of Dublin.
- 17 June – Aer Lingus inaugurates a Dublin-Paris air service.
- 6 July
  - a new republican political party, Clann na Poblachta, was formed in Dublin.
  - The inaugural Skerries 100 motorcycle race took place near Skerries, County Dublin
- 25 July – Éamon de Valera's motion to apply for membership of the United Nations is accepted in the Dáil.
- 6 August – on the first anniversary of the Hiroshima bombing, Captain Bob Lewis, the co-pilot of the Enola Gay, the aircraft which dropped the bomb, arrives at Shannon Airport, completing his first flight as a civil aviation pilot.
- 12 August – a plane bringing 23 French Girl Guides to Dublin crashes on Djouce in the Wicklow Mountains with no fatalities.
- 29 August – George Bernard Shaw is honoured by being made a freeman of Dublin.
- 2 September – the Emergency Powers Act 1939 expires. The Defence Forces (Requisitions of Emergency) Order, 1940, is also revoked by Order (signed 28 August) with effect from this date.
- September – the Marine Service is formally disbanded and replaced by the Naval Service as a permanent component of the Irish Defence Forces.
- 6 October – seventy primary school teachers protest about low pay on the pitch at Croke Park at half-time during the Kerry–Roscommon All-Ireland Football Final.
- 22 November – Walt Disney arrives in Dublin. He has a meeting with the Irish Folklore Commission to further his investigation of leprechauns for a forthcoming film.
- 18 December – the government announces the release of 24 internees, including Brendan Behan.
- 28 December — TWA flight 6963 crashed during landing at Shannon Airport on the island of Inismacnaughton in Clare. Nine of the twenty-three passengers and crew were killed.

=== Full date unknown ===
- A statue of Queen Victoria which was erected in 1849 on the gable of the Aula Maxima building at Queen's College, Cork, and taken down in 1935, is finally buried under the lawn in the President's Garden for safekeeping

== Arts and literature ==
- 5 August – Frank Carney's religious melodrama The Righteous are Bold opens at the Abbey Theatre, Dublin, where it runs for an unprecedented 14 weeks.
- Denis Devlin publishes his Lough Derg and Other Poems in New York.
- Patrick Kavanagh publishes his poem "On Raglan Road" (under the title "Dark Haired Miriam Ran Away") in The Irish Press (3 October).
- Mervyn Wall publishes his first novel, The Unfortunate Fursey.
- Jack Butler Yeats paints Men of Destiny and The Whistle of a Jacket.

== Sport ==
=== Football ===
League of Ireland
Winners: Cork United

FAI Cup
Winners: Drumcondra 2–1 Shamrock Rovers.

=== Golf ===
- Irish Open is won by Fred Daly (Northern Ireland).

== Births ==
- 2 February – Tony Byrne, soccer player (died 2016).
- 15 March – John Dempsey, soccer player (died 2024).
- 2 April – Ruairi Quinn, leader of the Labour Party and Cabinet Minister, TD for Dublin South-East.
- 9 April – Charlie O'Connor, Fianna Fáil TD for Dublin South-West.
- 15 April – Michael Neary, Archbishop of Tuam (1995– ).
- 17 April – Henry Kelly, journalist, writer and television presenter.
- 25 April – Peter Sutherland, barrister, businessman and politician (died 2018).
- May – Mary Upton, Labour Party TD for Dublin South-Central.
- 18 June – Ray Treacy, soccer player and manager.

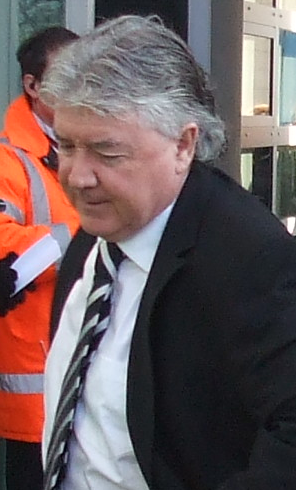
Joe Kinnear

- 12 July – Seán Keane, fiddle player with The Chieftains (died 2023).
- 13 July – Seán Ó Laoire, architect and urban planner (died 2026).
- 18 July – John Naughton, journalist, author and academic
- 6 August – Brendan Ryan, Independent then Labour Party Senator.
- 10 August – Jimmy Conway, soccer player (died 2020).
- 24 August – BP Fallon, author and photographer.
- 12 September – Pat Moylan, Fianna Fáil politician, Cathaoirleach of Seanad Éireann (2007– ).
- 29 September – Michael Keating, Fine Gael TD and Minister, Deputy Leader of the Progressive Democrats and Lord Mayor of Dublin.
- 2 October – Terry Conroy, soccer player.
- 19 October – Jim Mitchell, Fine Gael TD and Cabinet Minister (died 2002).
- 21 November – Jim Fahy, journalist and broadcaster (died 2022).
- 29 November – Eamonn Campbell, folk guitarist/singer with The Dubliners (died 2017).
- 1 December – Gilbert O'Sullivan, pop singer/songwriter.
- 20 December – Tom McGurk, poet, journalist and broadcaster.
- 27 December – Joe Kinnear, soccer player and manager (died 2024).
- 31 December – Martin Mansergh, historian and Fianna Fáil TD for Tipperary South (died 2025).
  Full date unknown

- Tom Foley, racehorse trainer (died 2021).
- Séamus Horgan, Limerick hurler.
- Charlie McCarthy, Cork hurler.
- Con Roche, Cork hurler.

== Deaths ==
- 16 January – Bill O'Callaghan, Cork hurler (b. c1869).
- 19 January – Pádraic Ó Máille, Sinn Féin MP and TD, Fianna Fáil Senator (born 1878).
- 21 January – James Crowley, Sinn Féin TD, member First Dáil and Cumann na nGaedheal TD.
- 2 February – Jack White, soldier, trade unionist, co-founder of the Irish Citizen Army (born 1879).
- 27 February – James Cecil Parke, international rugby player, tennis player, golfer and Olympic medallist (born 1881).
- 9 March – John J. Glennon, Roman Catholic Archbishop of the Archdiocese of Saint Louis and cardinal (born 1862).
- 20 March – Frederic Trench, 3rd Baron Ashtown, peer (born 1868).
- 20 April – Hanna Sheehy-Skeffington, feminist, suffragette and writer (born 1877).
- 5 April – Martin Moffat, soldier, recipient of the Victoria Cross (born 1882).
- 22 August – John Philip Bagwell, general manager Great Northern Railway, Seanad member (born 1874).
- 23 August – Samuel Cunningham, politician and Irish Privy Councillor (born 1862).
- 28 August – Rudolph Lambart, 10th Earl of Cavan, British Army commander in World War I, later Chief of the Imperial General Staff and Field Marshal (born 1865).
- 20 October – William Bernard Barry, politician in the United States (born 1902).
- 13 November – Patrick McLane, Democratic member of the U.S. House of Representatives from Pennsylvania (born 1875).
- 16 December – Blayney Hamilton, cricketer (born 1872).
- 30 December – Mick Ahern, Cork hurler (born 1905).
