= Sawlaram Haldankar =

Indian painter (1882–1968)

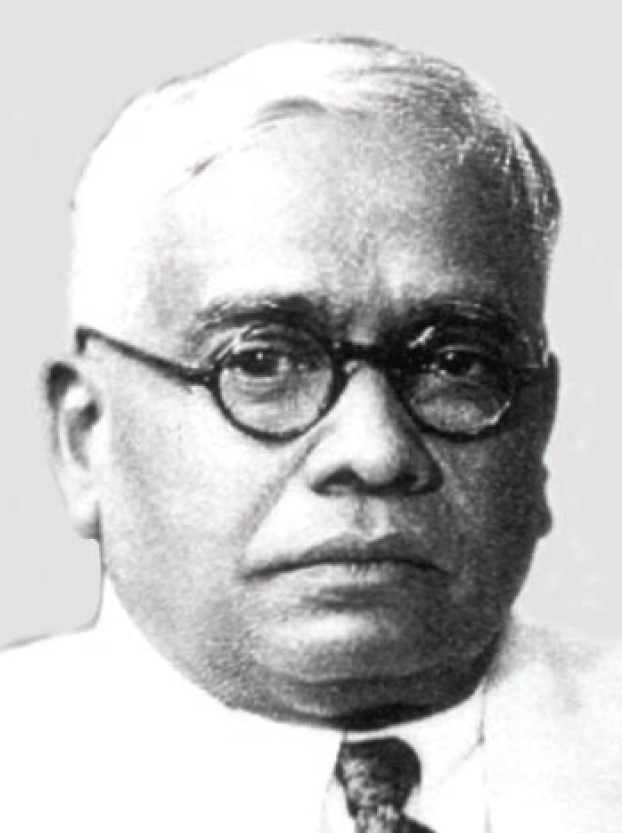
- Born: 1882
- Died: 1968
- Education: Sir J.J. School of Art
- Known for: Painting
- Notable work: Glow of Hope

Sawlaram Lakshman Haldankar (1882–1968), also known as S L Haldankar, was a well-known Indian painter.

== Early life ==
Haldankar was born into a family from Sawantwadi, which was then a Princely State and is located today in Maharashtra state. He showed early talent in the arts and this was noticed by the headmaster of his school in Sawantwadi. The headmaster commended the talented student to the Raja of this tiny state, who encouraged the young lad to develop his talents.

After Haldankar completed his schooling, the Raja gave him a scholarship to study at the Sir J.J. School of Art, Bombay. Haldankar duly enrolled and studied under the tutelage of famous artists Mahadev Vishwanath Dhurandhar and Cecil Leonard Burns. He soon distinguished himself by winning several prizes at a young age and exhibiting his work at several exhibitions. He was accomplished in both watercolors and oils, with a special mastery over portraits.

== Career ==
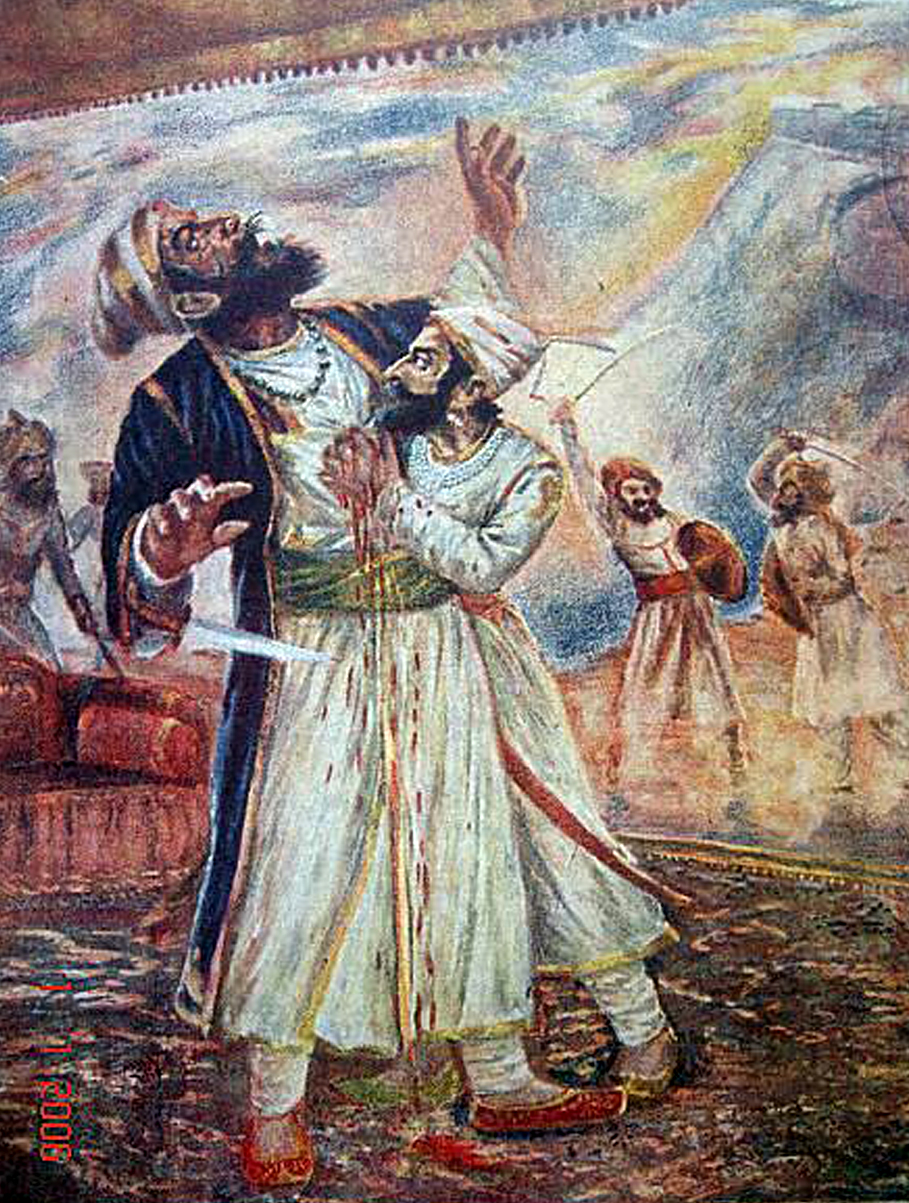
An early 20th century Painting by Sawlaram Haldankar of Shivaji Maharaj fighting the Bijapuri general Afzal Khan

After graduating from the J.J. School of Arts, Haldankar accepted a teaching job at the same institution and served there for some years. In 1908, he left the J.J. School of Art and founded the Haldankar Fine Arts' Institute in 1940 in Bombay. Later, with some friends, he founded the Art Society of India in 1918 and became its first president. Many painters were trained by Haldankar, both at J.J. School of Art and at Haldankar Fine Arts' Institute.

Haldankar's works have been exhibited in Mumbai, Madras, Simla and the Royal Society of British Artists, London. He was awarded two commendation certificates by the Royal Society of British Artists. He was awarded the Governor's Prize by the British Government of Bombay Presidency in the years 1910, 1927 and 1932. After independence, S.L. Haldankar was felicitated by the President of India, Dr. Rajendra Prasad. He was also felicitated as a fellow of the Lalit Kala Akademi, New Delhi. An Italian encyclopedia (available at a library in Wai in Satara district of Maharashtra) ranks Haldankar as one of the three finest watercolorists in the world.

His works can be found in several prominent museums, including Prince of Wales Museum (Mumbai), National Gallery of Modern Art (New Delhi), National Gallery of Modern Art, Mumbai, Jaganmohan Palace Museum (Mysore), Moscow Academy of Art (Russia), Nagpur Museum (Nagpur) and Delhi Art Gallery. Perhaps his most famous painting is Glow of Hope, also known as Woman With the Lamp, which is currently exhibited at Jaganmohan Palace in Mysore ( Karnataka State ). This painting is often incorrectly attributed to Raja Ravi Varma, however in fact it was painted by Haldankar himself. The young girl in that painting is none other than his own daughter Gita Haldankar.

== Personal life ==
As per Indian Wedding customs, Haldankar was married at a very young age to a woman of similar family background, in an alliance arranged by their parents. The marriage was happy and conventional. They had seven children, four sons and three daughters. The four sons were Gajanan, Madhukar, Babanrao and Vijayanand (listed by age). His eldest son Gajanan, better known as G. S. Haldankar, grew to be a renowned painter, and he specialized in watercolors. The third son, Babanrao Haldankar, is a noted classical singer. His three daughters are known today through the beautiful paintings he created.

The eldest daughter, Gita Haldankar (later known as Gita Uplekar), was twelve when, during Diwali she was asked by "Bhau" (her father) to pose for the well known painting - today known as Lady with Lamp under his Glow of Hope series. She died aged 102 in Kolhapur in 2018. She was married to Krishnakant Uplekar. The second daughter, Lilavati, was also married into the Uplekar family, to Govindrao Uplekar. Govindrao was a freedom fighter who fought alongside Yeshwantrao Chauhan. Sawlaram Haldankar made another painting with Lilavati known as the Divine Flame, also under the same concept of Glow of Hope. These paintings were made in the same series of deriving glow from a central source like a lamp that throws dramatic shadows in the background and lights the subject's face in a beautiful light. Lilavati had three sons Arun Uplekar, Shrikant Uplekar, and Anand Uplekar. Today Arun Uplekar's daughter Krupali Uplekar Krusche is a Professor of architecture and urban planning at the University of Notre Dame.
