= The History of Transportation =

1946 mural by Dean Cornwell

The History of Transportation is a 1946 mural by the American visual artist and illustrator Dean Cornwell (1892–1960) in 10 Rockefeller Plaza in Midtown Manhattan in New York City which was once the headquarters of Eastern Airlines. The work is spread across three walls in the building's lobby and is composed of silver and gold leaf on oil on canvas and fittingly honors the building's original anchor tenant. The three sections of the mutual are subtitled "Night Flight:, "New World Unity", and "Day Flight". The work was commissioned during the boom in commercial airline travel following World War 2 and was inspired by it.
