= Dean Cornwell =

American illustrator and painter (1892–1960)

- Born: March 5, 1892; Louisville, Kentucky, U.S.
- Died: December 4, 1960 (aged 68); New York City, U.S.
- Known for: Illustration, painting
- Movement: Realism
- Spouse: Mildred Montrose Kirkham Cornwell (1893 - 1974)
- Children: Kirkham Randolph Cornwell (1920 - 1984), Patricia Cornwell (1923 - )

Dean Cornwell (March 5, 1892 – December 4, 1960) was an American illustrator and muralist. His oil paintings were frequently featured in popular magazines and books as literary illustrations, advertisements, and posters promoting the war effort. Throughout the first half of the 20th century he was a dominant presence in American illustration. At the peak of his popularity he was nicknamed the "Dean of Illustrators".

== Background ==
Cornwell was born in Louisville, Kentucky. His father, Charles L. Cornwell, was a civil engineer whose drawings of industrial subjects fascinated Cornwell as a child. He began his professional career as a cartoonist for the Louisville Herald. Soon thereafter he moved to Chicago, where he studied at the Art Institute and worked for the Chicago Tribune. In 1915 he moved to New Rochelle, New York, a well known artist colony, and studied in New York City under Harvey Dunn at the Art Students League of New York. Eventually he traveled to London to study mural painting as an apprentice to Frank Brangwyn. Brangwyn's style influenced Cornwell's artistic development in "rendering the human figure, bold outlines, flattened picture plane, and graphic approach to composition."

Cornwell married Mildred Kirkham in 1918 but married life was difficult. From 1935 until his death, Dean and Mildred lived separately but never divorced. Cornwell taught and lectured at the Art Students League in New York. He served as president of the Society of Illustrators from 1922 to 1926, and was elected to its Hall of Fame in 1959. In 1934, he was elected into the National Academy of Design as an Associate Academician, and became a full Academician in 1940. He served as president of the National Society of Mural Painters from 1953 to 1957.

== Career ==
Cornwell's paintings were in Cosmopolitan, Harper's Bazaar, Redbook, and Good Housekeeping magazines, illustrating the work of authors including Pearl S. Buck, Lloyd Douglas, Edna Ferber, Ernest Hemingway, W. Somerset Maugham, and Owen Wister. Cornwell's February 1953 cover of a riverboat for True was later made into a U.S. Postage stamp as part of the USPS's 2001 American Illustrators series.

Although a prolific and successful magazine illustrator, Cornwell felt that such advertising was too ephemeral, and that magazine illustration was not enough to "guarantee his artistic immortality" and sought means to permanently showcase his talent through mural painting where his work could be readily viewed by the public. In 1927, the Los Angeles Public Library held a competition to paint the central rotunda of the building with murals depicting the history of California. Cornwell submitted three entries, two under pseudonyms and one under his real name, competing with 25 other muralists. Cornwell won the competition under his own name, and won 2nd and 3rd with his two other entries. He completed the murals in 1933, composed of four large oil paintings, 40 feet wide, and eight 20-foot murals containing over 300 figures for the commission price of $50,000.

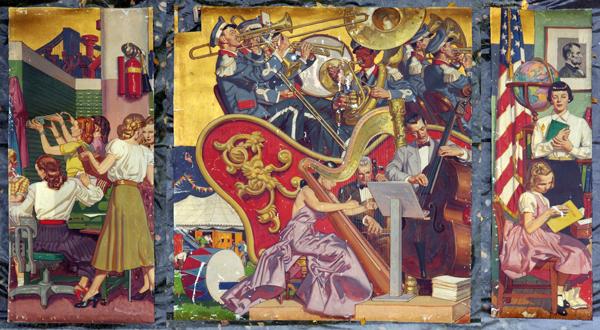
A gift of the American Federation of Labor commissioned to the artist and illustrator Dean Cornwell (1892–1960).

The successful completion of the Los Angeles Public Library murals led to more commissions at other public buildings, such as the Lincoln Memorial Shrine in Redlands, California, "The History of Transportation" in the Eastern Airlines Building (now 10 Rockefeller Plaza), executed Federal Art Project murals in two post offices, Chapel Hill, North Carolina and Morganton, North Carolina, with other murals in the Warwick New York Hotel in New York City, the New England Telephone headquarters building in Boston, the Davidson County Courthouse and Sevier State Office Building in Tennessee, and the Centre William Rappard in Geneva, Switzerland. His murals were seen by millions of visitors, and millions more were reached through his published reproductions of murals. Cornwell served as president of the National Society of Mural Painters from 1953 to 1957.

By the time the U.S. entered WWII Cornwell was commissioned to create paintings of men in combat by the War and Navy departments, and by corporations like the Fisher Body company. Cornwell also painted patriotic imagery for the Coca-Cola Company, the Pennsylvania Railroad, and did portraiture of wounded GIs as part of the U.S.O. entertainment program organized by the Society of Illustrators. It was during WWII that Cornwell was commissioned to illustrate two of his most successful works for The American Weekly for "Dean Cornwell Paints the Holyland" and "Dean Cornwell Paints the Missions." After World War II television became the more popular medium and people were less inclined to read short fiction from magazines, and heralded the end of the "celebrity illustrator." Throughout the 1930s and 1940s Cornwell remained a popular illustrator but he considered mural painting his "true vocation."

Shortly before his death, Cornwell accepted a commission to finish painting a mural for the Berkshire Life Insurance Company after the original commissioned artist, fellow illustrator Norman Rockwell had trouble with the "complexity of the medium". It was also Rockwell's first attempt at mural painting and he abandoned the project. Cornwell died before completing the mural and his assistant Cliff Young finished the project.

Artist and illustrator James Montgomery Flagg wrote, "Cornwell is the illustrator par excellence-his work is approached by few and overtopped by none...he is the most sought-after illustrator of the day. His secret is this. He is a born artist."

== Death ==
Cornwell continued to work until his failing health. On December 3, 1960, Cornwell experienced severe abdominal pains and was admitted to the Roosevelt Hospital in New York City for surgery but died due to a "heart ailment" on December 4, 1960. He was 68 years old.

== Examples of Cornwell's work ==
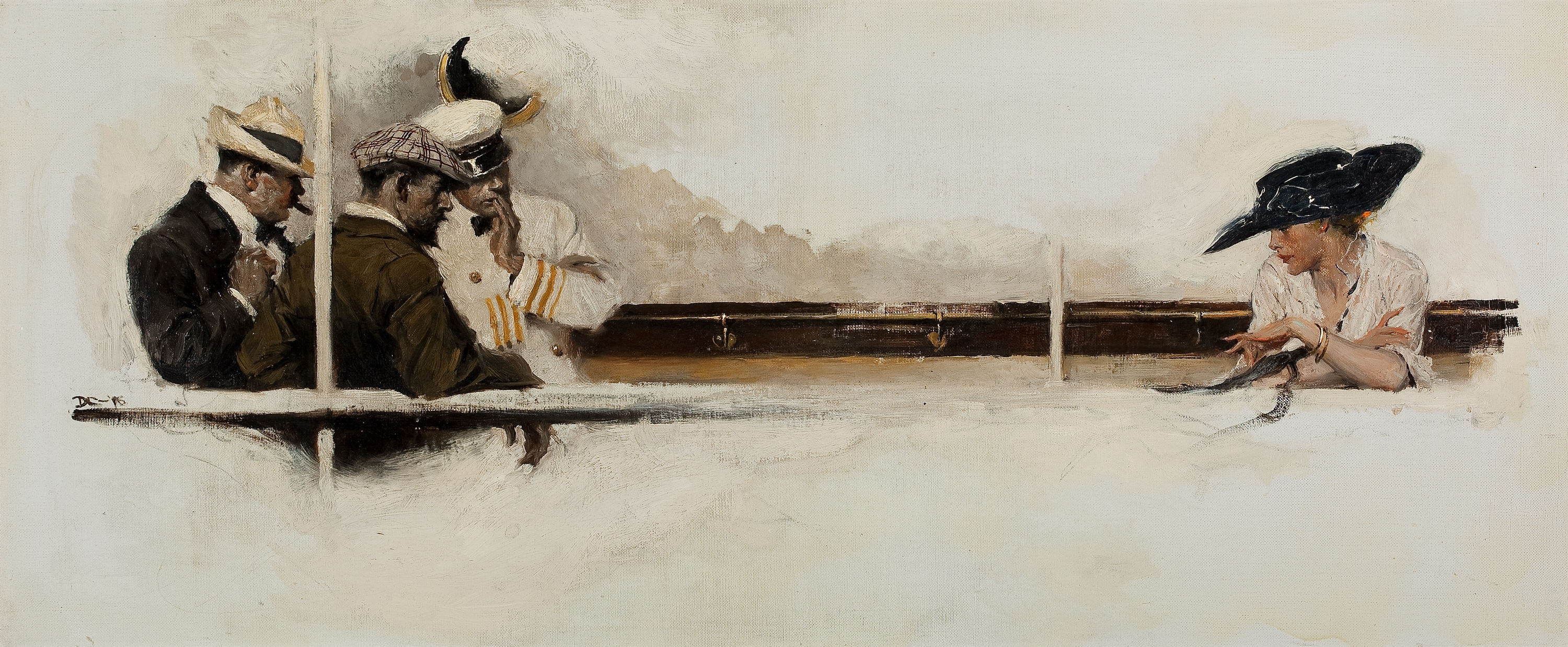
Some Necktie Lady (1916) oil on canvas 14.5 inch. x 34 inch.

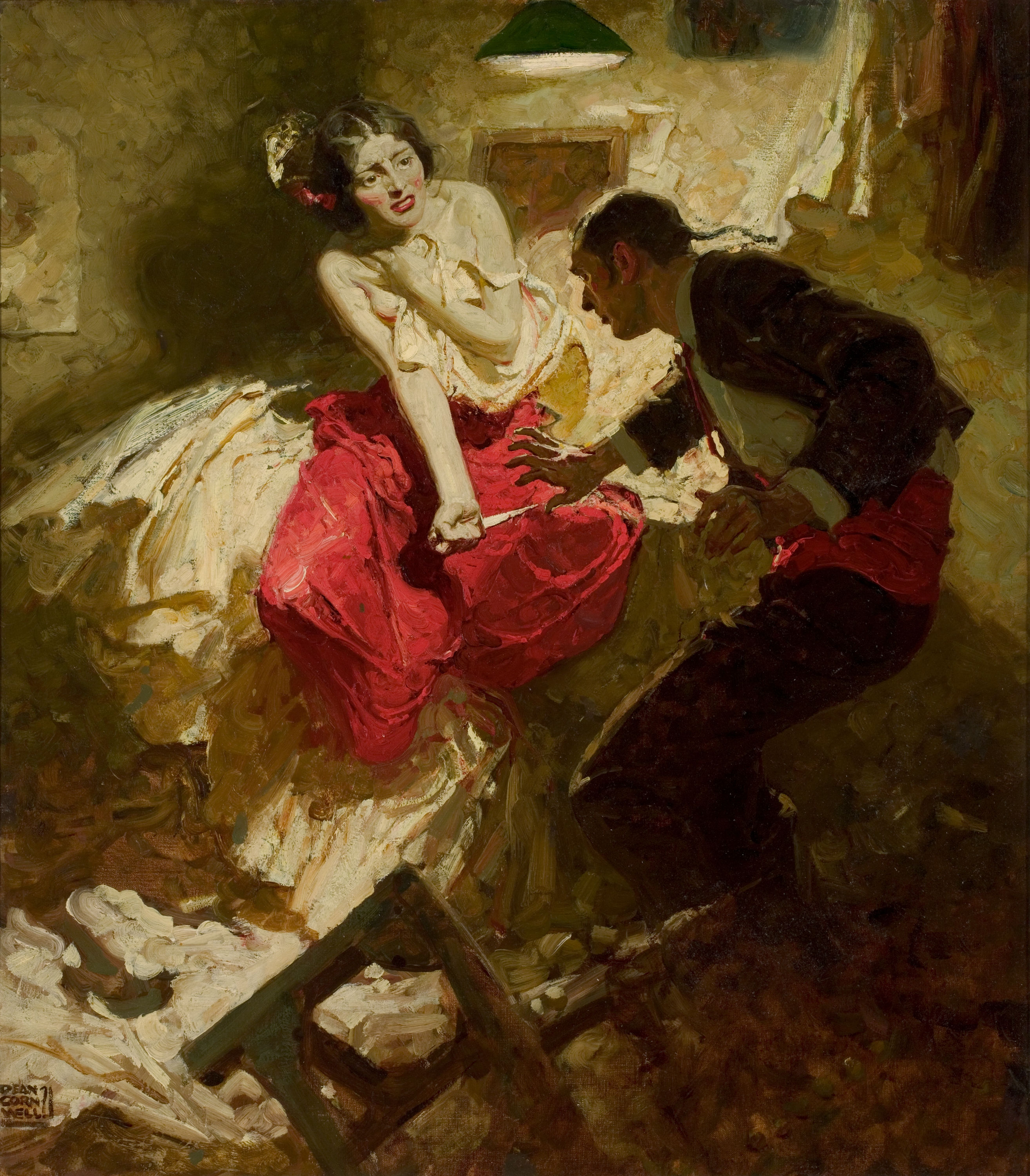
The Red Shawl Hearst's International magazine illustration (1921) oil on canvas 34 inch. x 30 inch.

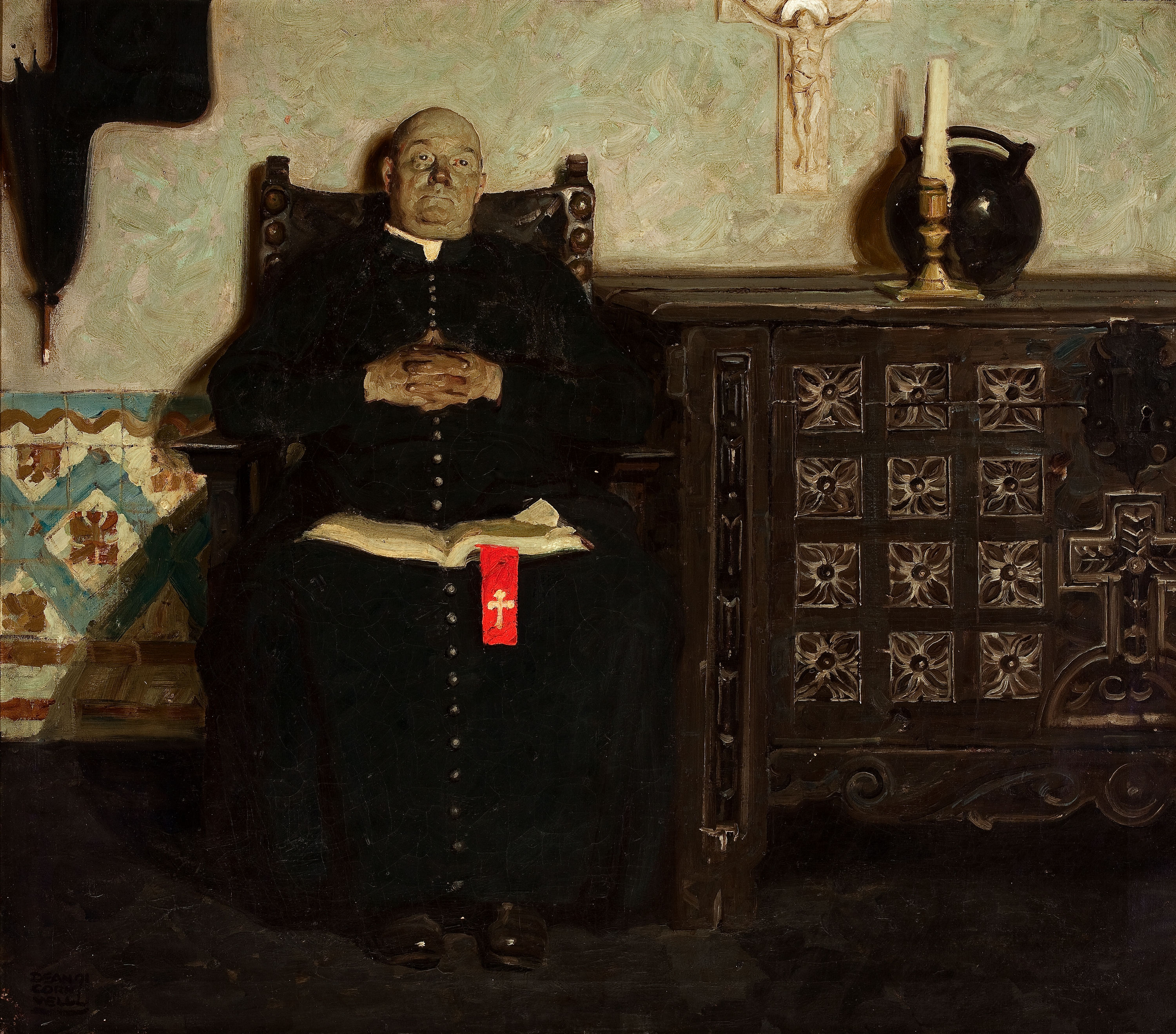
Priest, Spanish City (1921) oil on canvas 30 inch. x 34 inch.

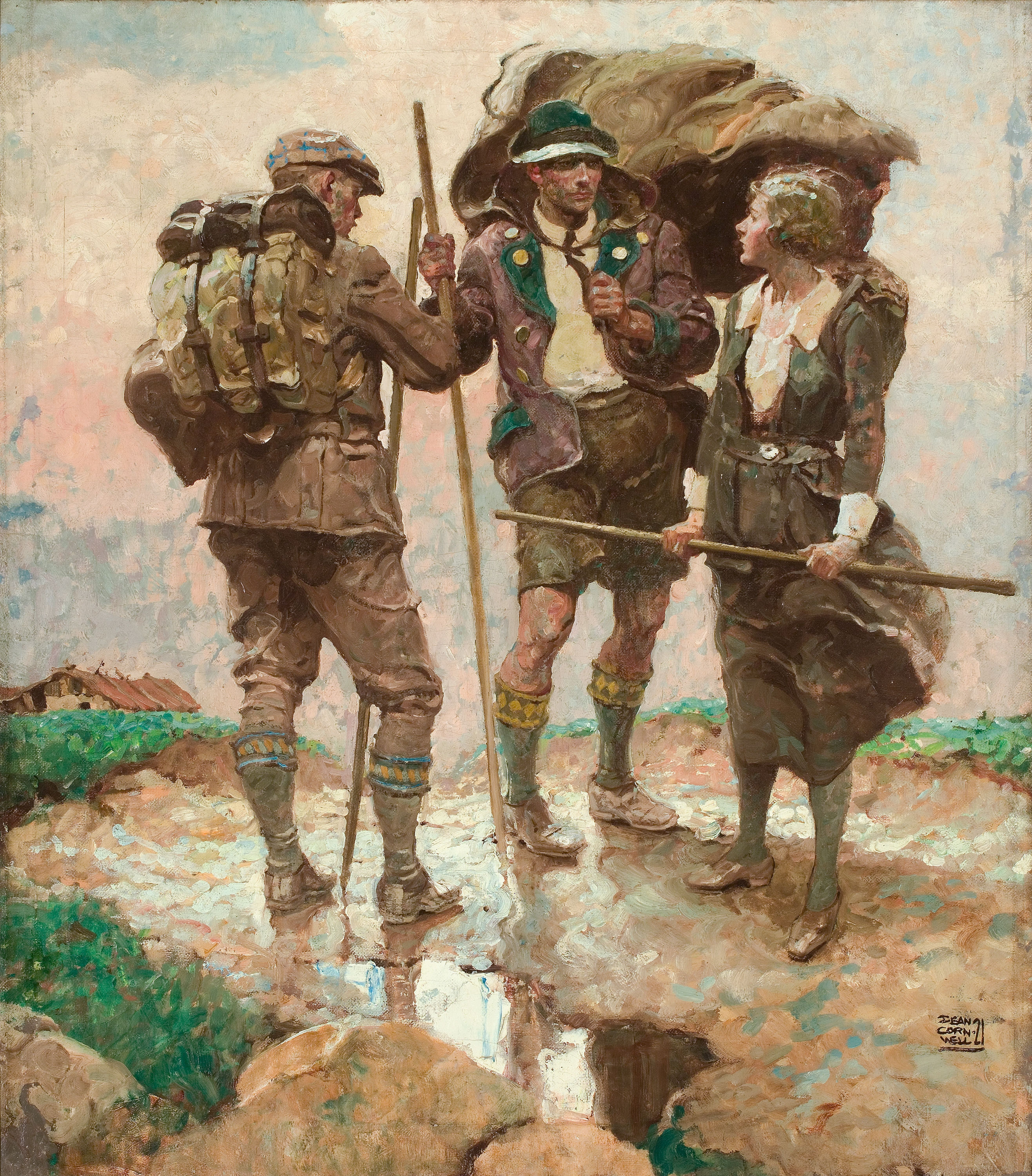
The Bridge Harper's Bazaar illustration (1921) oil on canvas 34 inch. x 30 inch.

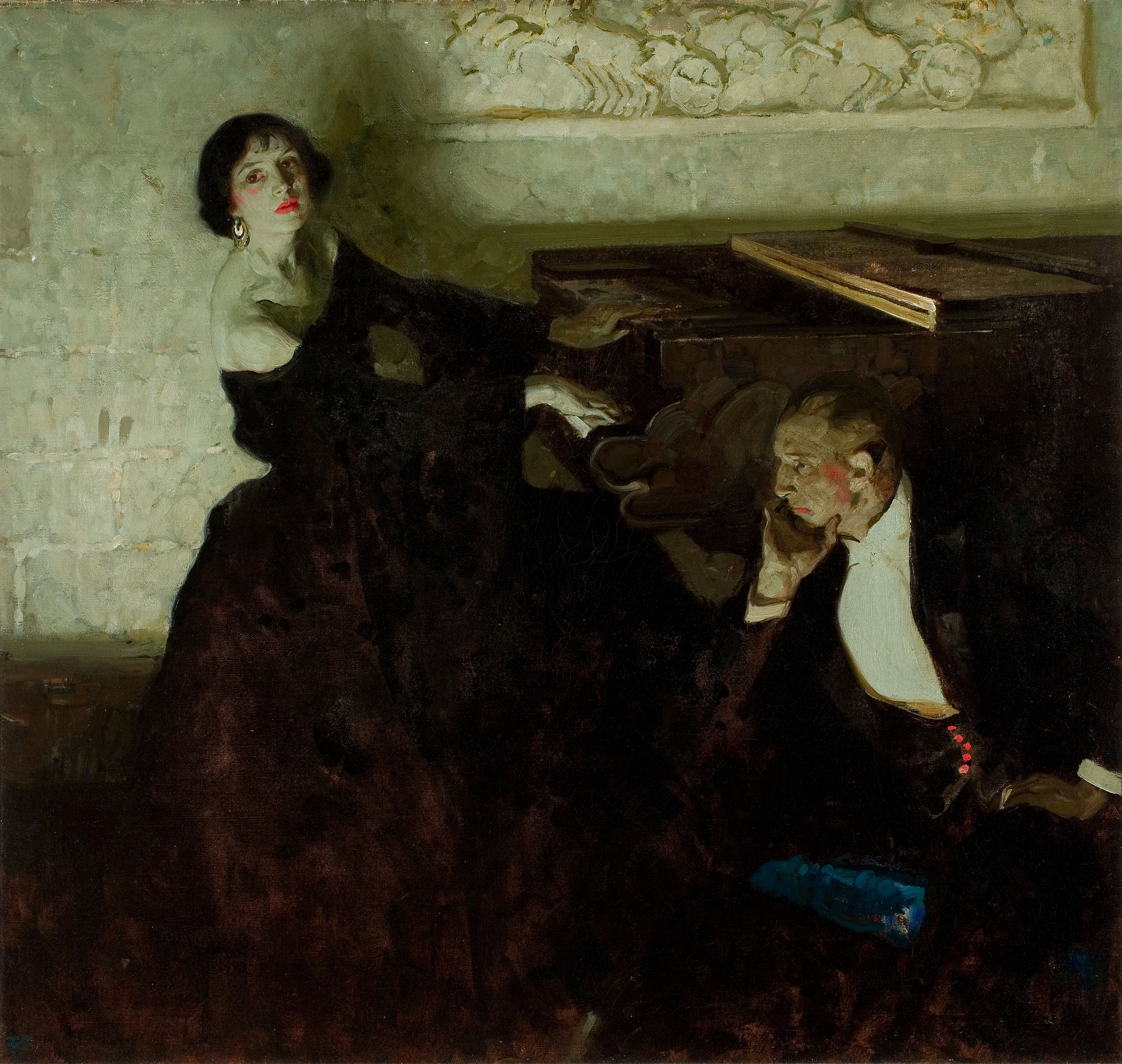
Romantic Couple Seated by Piano Hearst's International magazine illustration (1922) oil on canvas 34 inch. x 36 inch.

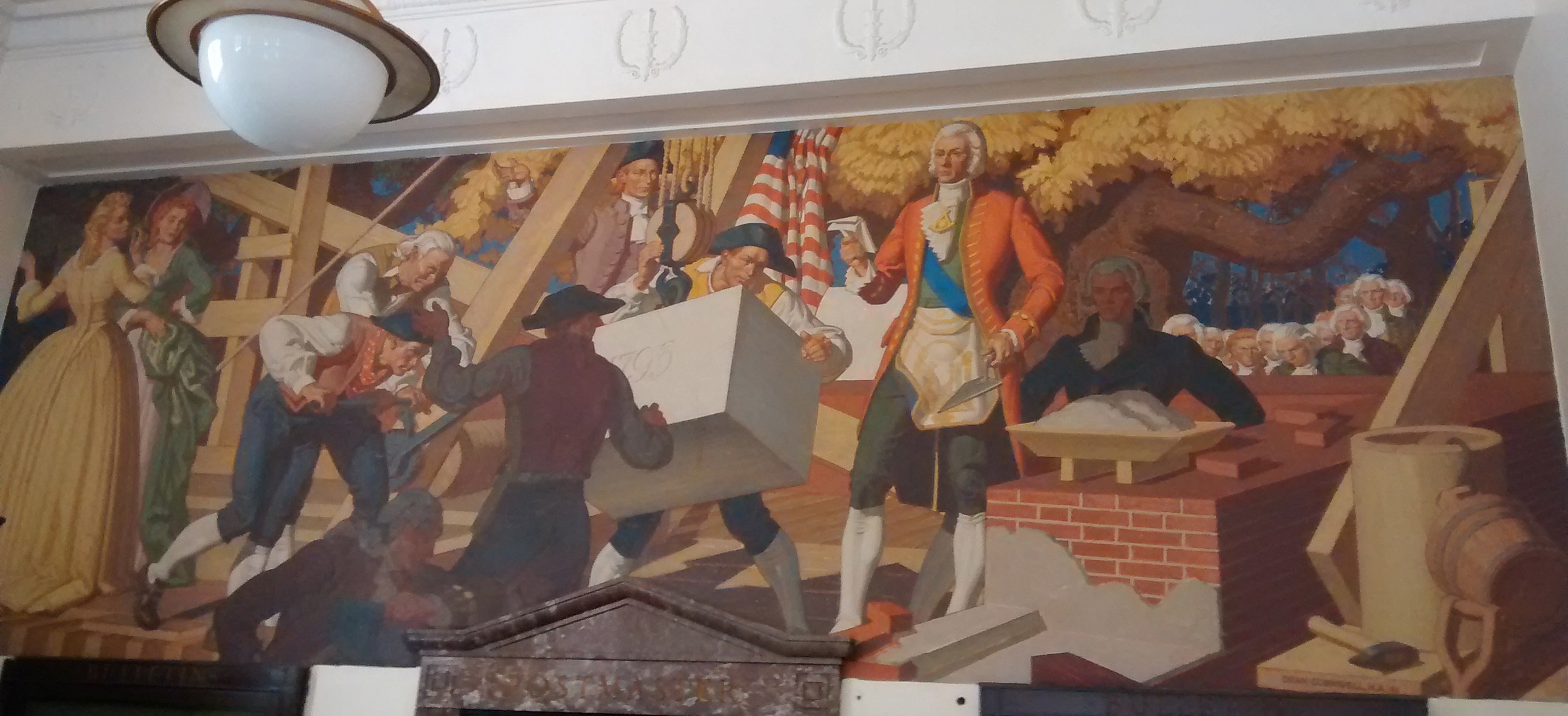
Laying the Cornerstone of Old East (1941), at the Chapel Hill Post Office

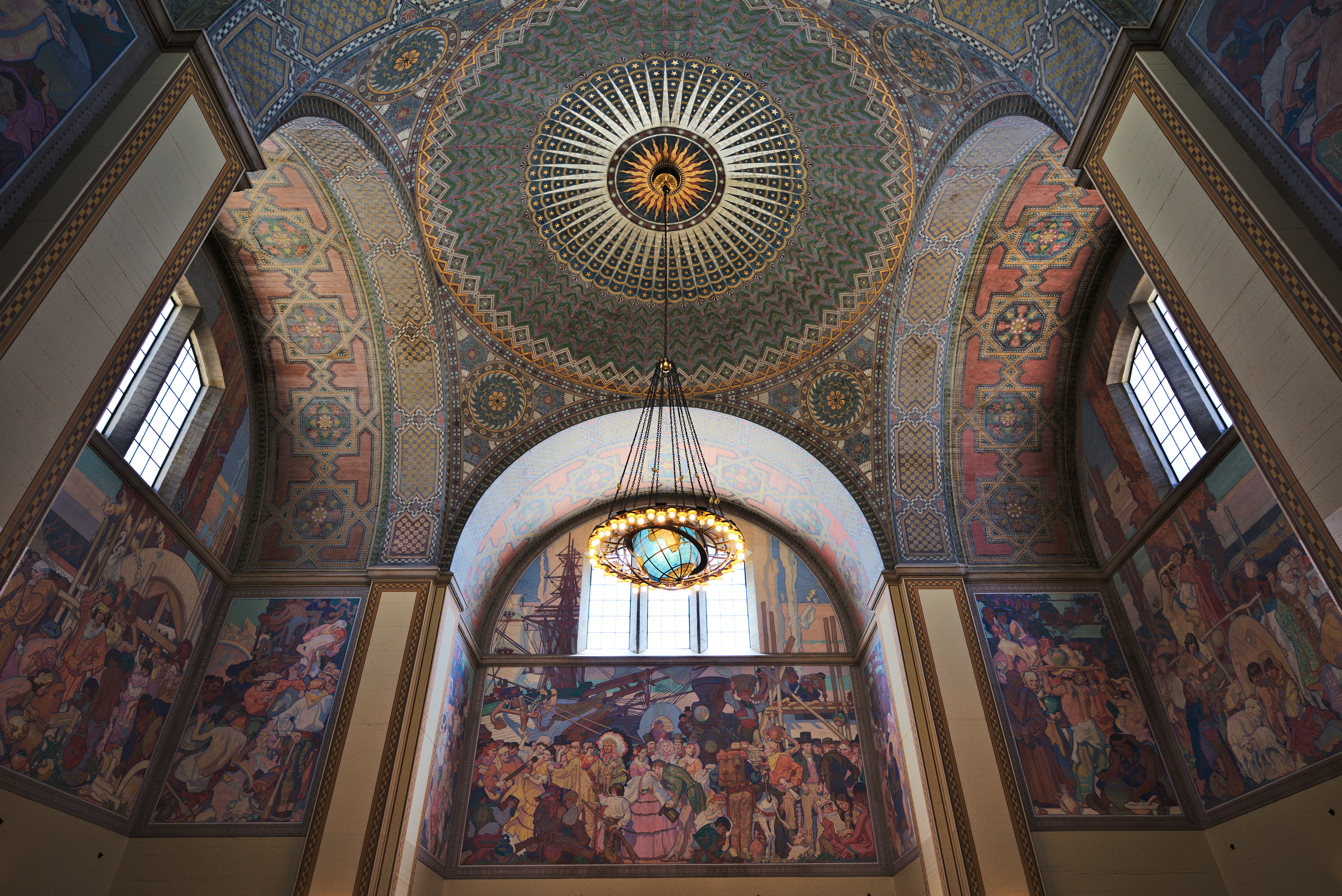
Murals in the Grand Rotunda of the Los Angeles Central Library depicting California history (1933)
