= Jaganmohan Palace =

Royal residence and arts gallery at Mysore, India

Jaganmohana Palace
- ಜಗನ್ಮೋಹನ ಅರಮನೆ
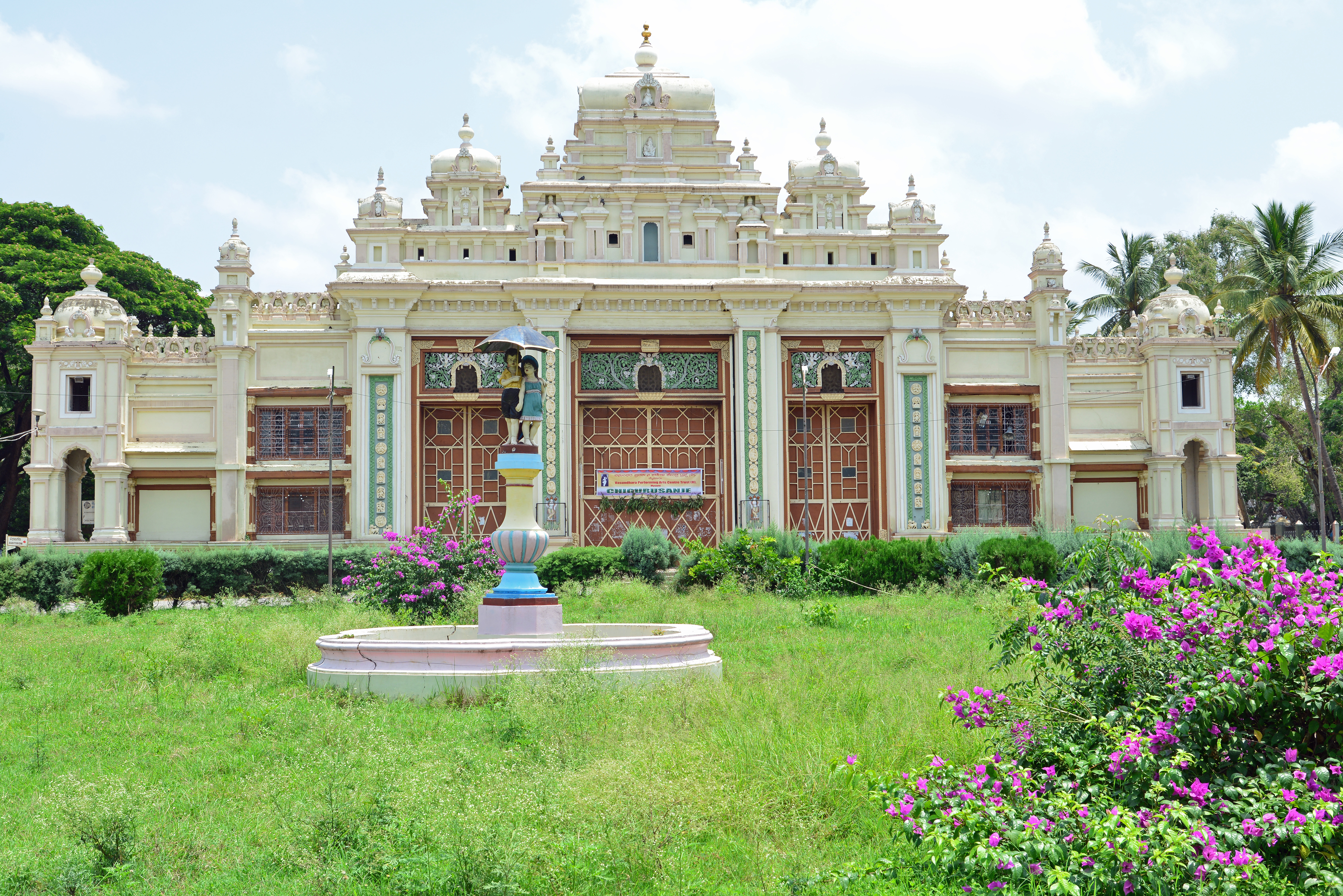
- Front facade and entrance to the royal auditorium of the palace; the palace itself is situated behind the auditorium

General information
- Architectural style: Indo-Saracenic
- Location: Lakshmi Vilas Rd, Mysore, India
- Coordinates: 12.3068366°N 76.649861°E,
- Groundbreaking: 1856
- Construction stopped: 1861
- Owner: Pramoda Devi Wadiyar

Technical details
- Floor count: 3

Sri Jayachamarajendra Art Gallery, commonly known by its former name Jaganmohana Palace, is a former royal mansion, arts museum and auditorium, and formerly an alternative royal residence of the ruling Maharaja of Mysore, located in Mysore, India, about 200m (600ft) to the west of Mysore Palace. Began in 1856 and completed in 1861, the palace is one of the oldest modern structures in Mysore.

The royal family would reside at the palace when renovations and construction works would be underway at Mysore Palace. The last time the palace was inhabited by the royal family was in 1897 when the old Mysore Palace burned down due to a fire accident. The ruling king at this time was Maharaja Krishnaraja Wadiyar IV.

== History ==
Over the Nagar uprising of 1830, Maharaja Krishnaraja Wodeyar III was deposed and the Mysore Commission was instituted. At the same time, Mysore Palace was seized from the maharaja by the commission. In these circumstances, the deposed maharaja commissioned the building of a large mansion, with several public and private courtyards, for the use of his family and retainers at a site which was a short distance from the grounds of his old palace. Whereas the old palace looked like a stone citadel from outside but was mainly made of wood inside, the new palace was designed to have a lighter, more modern look and a more comfortable internal layout. It was thus built with brick and mortar, reflecting many architectural embellishments, often made of valuable woods and precious stones.

After the commission was dissolved by the rendition of Mysore in 1881, the kingdom was restored to the next in line to the throne, Yuvaraja Chamarajendra Wadiyar X. The royal family moved to the old Mysore Palace, but Jaganmohan Palace continued to be used for ceremonial purposes and royal programmes (such as soirées of music, dance and poetry), presided over by the maharaja.

In 1896, during the wedding celebrations of Princess Jayalakshmi Devi, the eldest sister of the ruling maharaja Krishnaraja Wadiyar IV, the old palace caught fire and was very seriously damaged. The decision was taken to demolish that structure completely and build a new palace. The construction of a new palace began in 1897 and lasted until 1912. During this interval, Jaganmohan Palace once again became the primary residence of the maharaja and his family. Both personal and official ceremonies, including the maharaja's coronation in 1902 by George Curzon, the Governor-General of India, the maharaja's daily durbar, and major ceremonies connected to Mysore Dasara would be held there. The first session of Mysore Representative Council was also held here in July 1907, presided over by the dewan V. P. Madhava Rao. The early convocations of the Mysore University were also held in this palace. In 1915, Maharaja Krishnaraja Wadiyar IV converted the palace into an art gallery.

In 1950, Maharaja Jayachamarajendra Wadiyar placed the palace under a trust and opened it for public viewing. In 1955, by which time the Kingdom of Mysore had been subsumed into the Republic of India, the art gallery was enlarged with gifts of many precious articles by the maharaja.

In 1980, Srikantadatta Wadiyar renamed the palace Sri Jayachamarajendra Art Gallery in his father's honour. The palace is overseen by Pramoda Devi Wadiyar, the queen mother.

== Architecture ==
The palace is built in traditional Hindu style and has three storeys. A mural featured in the palace is the earliest known picture of Mysore Dasara and has been painted using vegetable dyes. A family tree of the Wadiyars tracing the lineage of the royal family is also painted on a wall in the palace. Two wooden artefacts displaying the Dashavatara, the ten incarnations of Lord Vishnu, are also present in the palace.

=== Auditorium ===
In 1900, an external facade with a royal auditorium hall behind was added to the palace. This facade has three entrances, and the entablature has religious motifs and miniature temples crafted on it. The auditorium is used for Carnatic arts such as dance, music, and other cultural programmes, mainly during the Dasara.

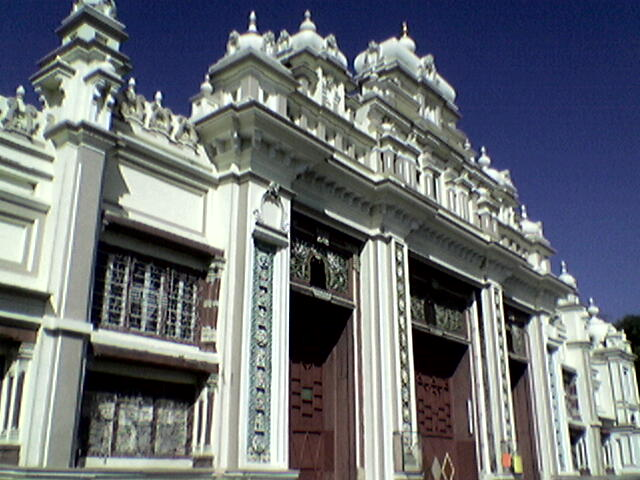
A closeup look of the front facade

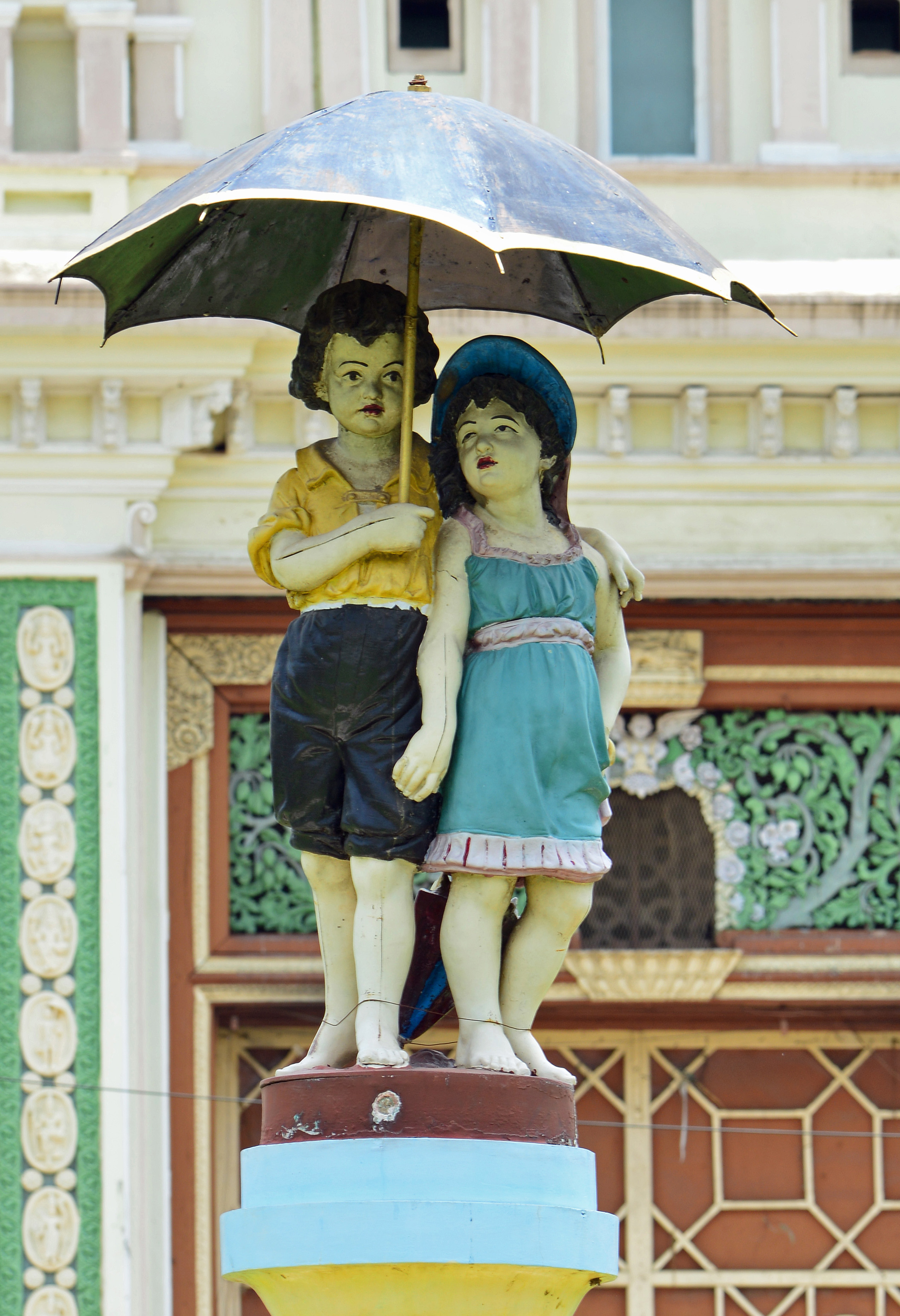
An art piece in the frontyard

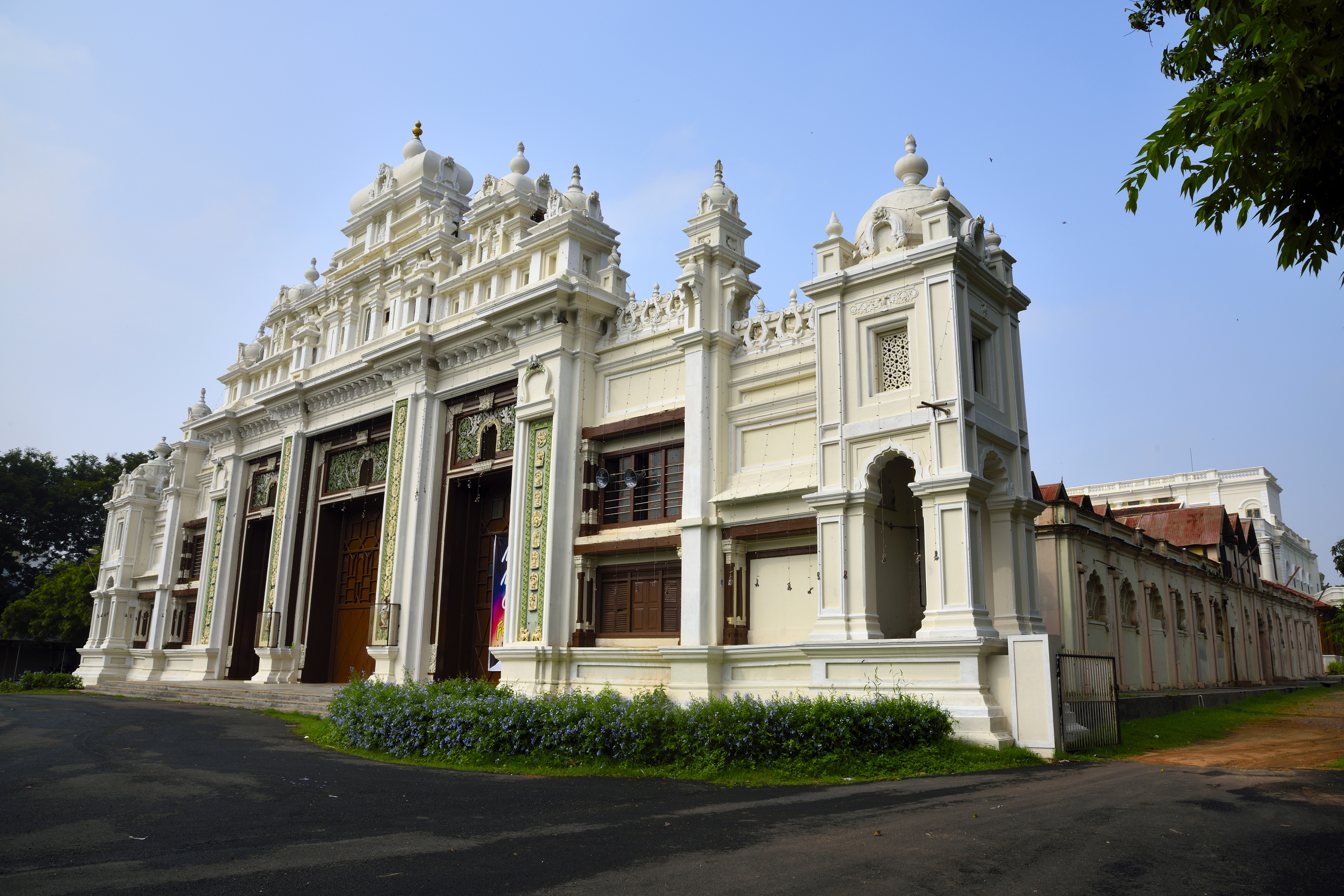
A side view of the palace auditorium

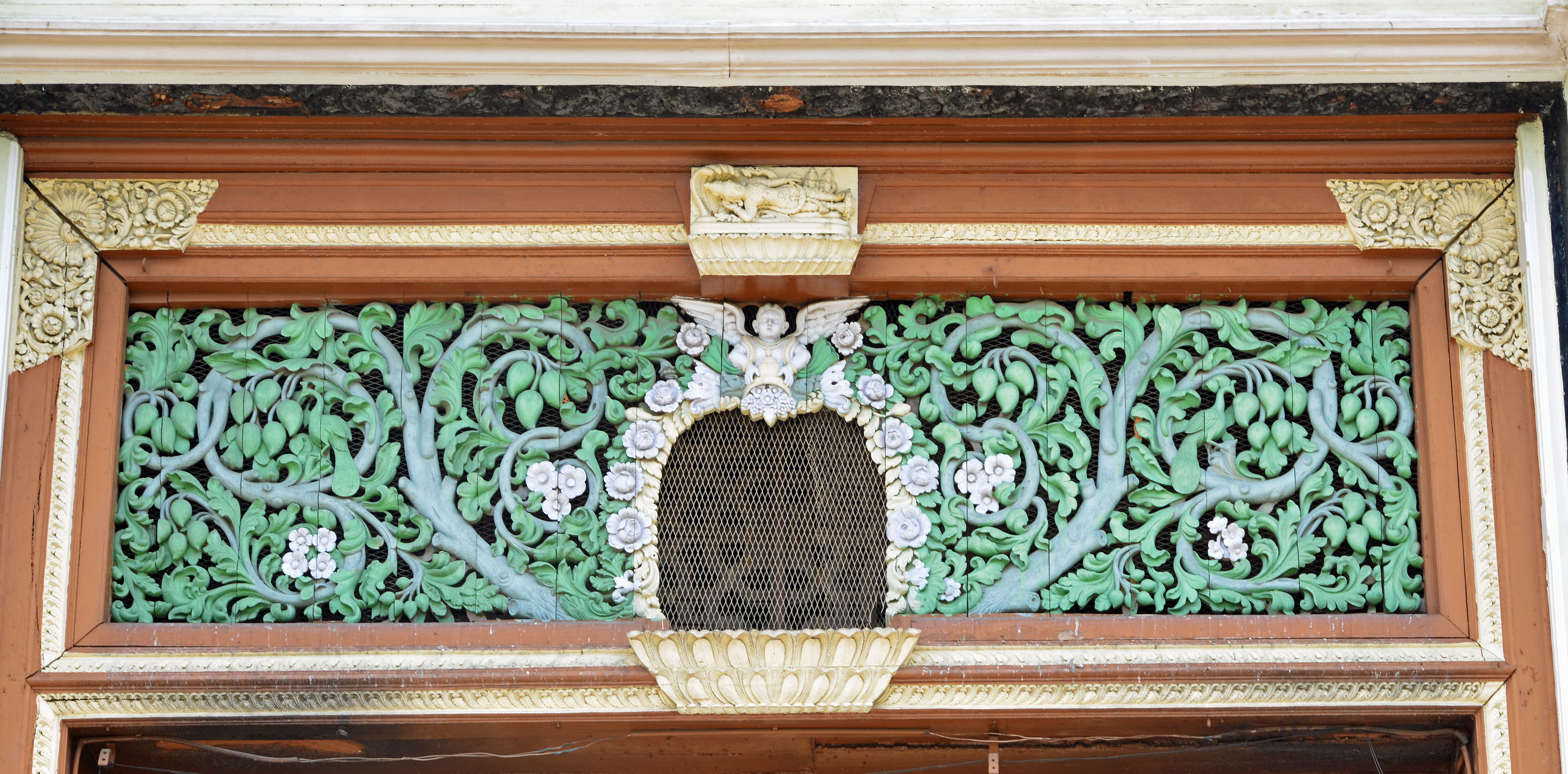
Detail of the front door to the palace behind the auditorium

== Art Gallery ==
The art gallery contains one of the largest collections of artefacts in South India. Most of these artefacts are paintings, prominent among which are those by Raja Ravi Varma, some of which demonstrate scenes from the Hindu epics such as the Ramayana and the Mahabharatha. The collection of paintings in the gallery exceed 2000 in number and these belong to different Indian styles of painting like Mysore, Mughal and Shantiniketan. Sixteen paintings of Raja Ravi Varma were donated to the gallery by Maharaja Jayachamarajendra Wodeyar. Another important painting present here is the Lady with the lamp painted by the Sawlaram Haldenkar and is placed in a dark room where it is the sole exhibit. This is to give an illusion that the glow of the lamp is illuminating the face of the woman. Some other painters whose works are exhibited here include Nikolai Roerich, Svetoslav Roerich, Rabindranath Tagore, Abanindranath Tagore, and the Ukil brothers (viz., Sharada Ukil, Ranada Ukil, and Barada Ukil). Another collection of paintings by Col. Scot, a British Army office during the Anglo-Mysore wars are said to be the only visual representation of those wars. Paintings made on a grain of rice which can be viewed only through a magnifier are also displayed here.

Other exhibits here include weapons of war, musical instruments, sculptures, brassware, antique coins, and currencies. A unique artefact exhibited here is a French clock which has a mechanism in which a parade of miniature soldiers is displayed every hour, beating drums marking the seconds, and a bugle marking the minute.

=== Restoration ===
In 2003, a new hall was built owing to insufficient room available to exhibit all the paintings. The original paintings of Raja Ravi Varma, which are over 100 years old, are being restored by the Regional Conservation Laboratory (RCL). Syrendri (which had a hole in the canvas), Victory of Meganath and Malabar Lady were some of Ravi Varma's paintings that were restored. Unscientific stretching of the canvas on which the paintings were drawn was one of the major problems noticed including unprotected exposure to dust, heat, and light. Even the murals on the walls had been damaged because of water seepage and these were also restored by RCL.

== See also ==
- List of Heritage Buildings in Mysore
- Full Guide | Jaganmohana Palace
