= Jan de Bie =

Dutch painter and photographer (1946-2021)

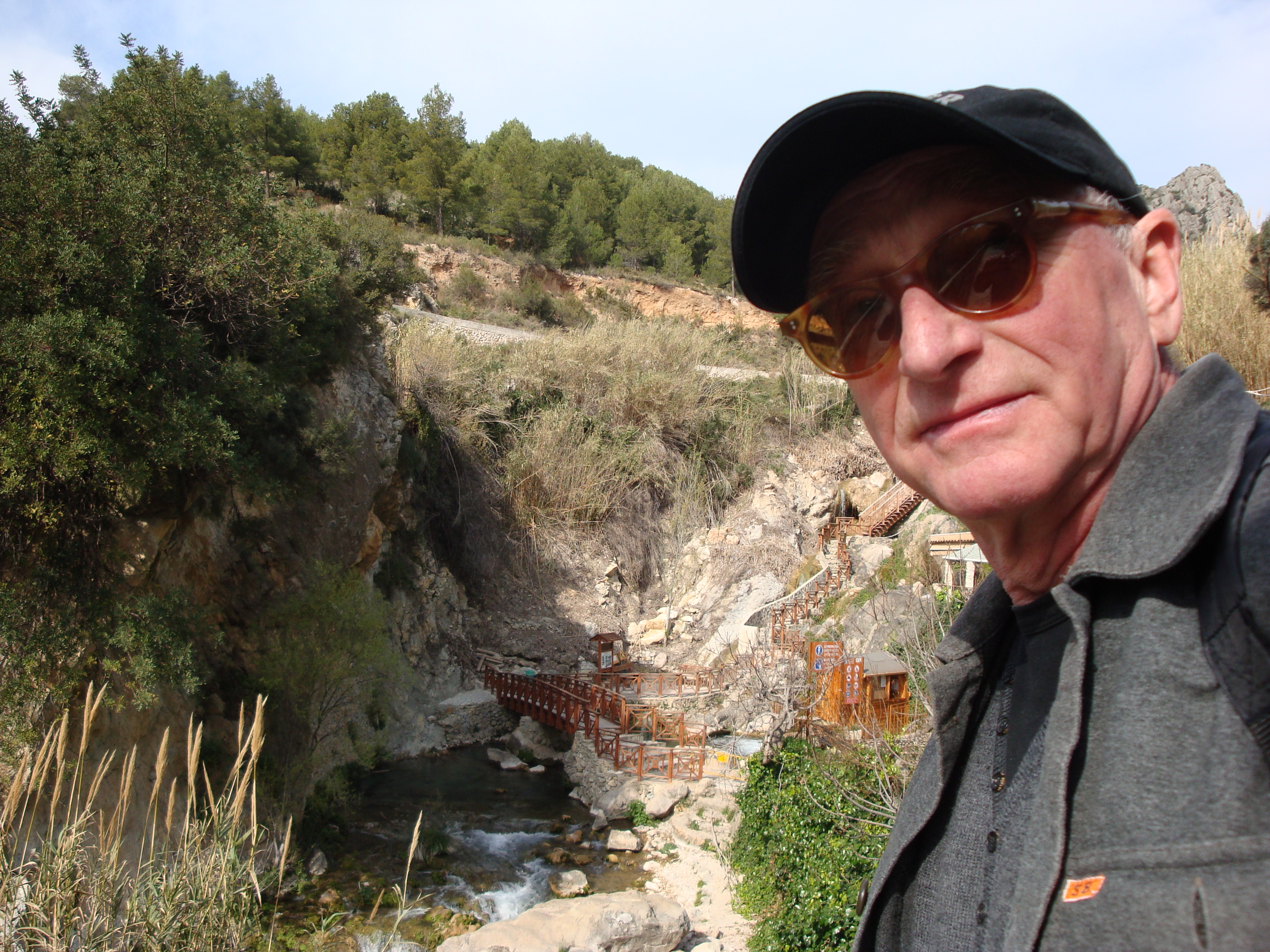
- De Bie in 2009
- Born: 30 May 1946 's-Hertogenbosch, Netherlands
- Died: 1 January 2021 (aged 74); Rosmalen, Netherlands
- Occupation: Artist

Jan de Bie (30 May 1946 – 1 January 2021) was a Dutch painter and photographer.

== Works ==
- Dooibroek, Valk, Zwaluw (1973–1975)
- Dooibroek Duiven (1981)
- Zondag/Maandag (1985)
- Papieren en Notulen van de Asgrauwe (2006)
- D'n Elvis (2007)

=== Catalogs ===
- Werken 1973-1989 (1989)
- The New Storytellers (1996)
- Verf en inkt, doen en laten (2004)
