= Men of Destiny =

1946 painting by Jack Butler Yeats

- Artist: Jack Butler Yeats
- Year: 1946
- Medium: Oil on canvas
- Dimensions: 51 cm × 69 cm (20 in × 27 in)
- Location: National Gallery of Ireland, Dublin

Men of Destiny is a painting by Irish artist Jack Butler Yeats, painted in 1946. An oil artwork on canvas, the modernist piece is noted for the strength and vibrancy of its colour palette and is considered to rank amongst Yeats' best work. The painting is on permanent display at the National Gallery of Ireland.

== Subject and title ==
The painting depicts three fishermen securing a boat at Rosses Point in Sligo, in the west of Ireland. Painted in the period between the Easter Rising and the Republic of Ireland Act 1948, it has been suggested that the title could refer to the destiny of ordinary men, like the fishermen shown, to defend Irish freedom.

The phrase "Men of Destiny" has also been used as a translation of the Irish Fianna Fáil (more commonly "Soldiers of Destiny"), which was the Irish name for the Irish Volunteers (as well as featuring in the Irish national anthem and as the name of an Irish potlical party).

== Media ==
=== Books ===
Men of Destiny is used as the cover image for "The Only Art of Jack B. Yeats: Letters and Essays", published by Lilliput Press in 2009.

=== Exhibitions ===
While normally on display in the National Gallery, Men of Destiny featured in the exhibition "Jack B. Yeats: The Outsider" in 2011, which ran in Sligo town from February 6–June 12.

=== Examinations ===
A question about the painting appeared on the Irish Leaving Certificate Art examination paper in 2006 for ordinary level students, under the "Art in Ireland" section.
